= Lists of people by cause of death =

This is an index of lists of people by cause of death, in alphabetical order of cause.

- Deaths due to the Chernobyl disaster (including list of victims)
- List of fatalities from aviation accidents
  - List of spaceflight-related accidents and incidents
  - List of fatalities due to wingsuit flying
- List of deaths through alcohol
- List of deaths from anorexia nervosa
- List of choking deaths
- List of deaths due to COVID-19
- List of drowning victims
- List of deaths from drug overdose and intoxication
- List of people killed in duels
- List of people who were executed
  - List of people executed by electrocution
  - List of people executed by lethal injection
  - List of people who were beheaded
  - Lists of people executed in the United States
  - List of people executed in India
  - List of executions in Japan
  - List of people executed in Mexico
  - List of people executed in Romania
- List of hazing deaths in the United States
- List of horse accidents (deaths and serious injuries)
- List of inventors killed by their own invention
- Lists of murders
  - Murdered sex workers in the United Kingdom
  - List of murdered musicians
    - List of murdered hip-hop musicians
- Lists of poisonings
- List of prison deaths
- List of people who died in traffic collisions
  - List of deaths by motorcycle crash
- List of skiing deaths
- List of fatal cougar attacks in North America
- List of fatal dog attacks
- List of fatal snake bites in Australia
- List of fatal snake bites in the United States
- List of fatal shark attacks in the United States
- List of fatal shark attacks in Australia
- List of fatal shark attacks in South Africa
- List of fatal shark attacks in Réunion
- List of fatal alligator attacks in the United States
- List of Spanish flu cases
- List of people who died of starvation
- List of selfie-related injuries and deaths
- List of suicides
  - List of suicides (A–M)
  - List of suicides (N–Z)
  - List of deaths from legal euthanasia and assisted suicide
- List of notable stunt accidents
  - List of television performers who died during production
- Lists of sportspeople who died during their careers
- List of tuberculosis cases
- List of volcanic eruption deaths
- Lists of unusual deaths
- List of women who died in childbirth

== See also ==
- Deaths by cause
- List of causes of death by rate
