= Death of Jaryd Atadero =

2002 cold case in, Colorado, US

Jaryd Atadero
- Jaryd Atadero
- Born: Jaryd J. Atadero; January 2, 1996
- Died: October 2, 1999 (aged 3); Colorado, U.S.
- Parents: Allyn Atadero; Stacie Mckissick

Jaryd J. Atadero was a three-year-old American boy who went missing on October 2, 1999, while hiking with a Christian social group on Big South Trail, a part of the Arapaho and Roosevelt National Forest in Colorado. Two businessmen located items of clothing belonging to Atadero during a hiking trip on June 4, 2003; search and rescue personnel recovered his partial remains on June 14. Atadero's disappearance and death remain a cold case and anomaly noted for the fact that the boy's cause of death has never been officially classified. While often reported as a mountain lion attack, experts on felids have argued that the discovered remains do not meet the typical patterns of a mountain lion attack. Others believe that Atadero had been the victim of an abduction and murder. Owing in part to the sensationalism surrounding the Colorado case of child glitz pageant contestant JonBenét Ramsey, the media was heavily involved during the search for Atadero.

== Early life ==
Jaryd Atadero was the three-year-old son of Allyn J. Atadero (1958–2025) and Stacie Mckissick, and had an older sister, then six-year-old Josallyn Atadero. Allyn Atadero was a divorcee raising both children, and he had recently joined the Christian Singles Network group, a local religious club. The club was known to have aided Allyn in daily life as a single father, and the Atadero family became heavily involved with group activities put on by the club. Allyn himself, a physical education teacher at a local junior high school, found comfort in the religious devotion.

== Disappearance ==
In October 1999, Allyn was staying with his two children in the Poudre River Resort, a commercial hotel owned by Allyn and his twin brother, Arlyn Atadero. Jaryd and Josallyn were anxious to go on an excursion to the nearby state fish hatchery with members of the Christian Singles Network group, something that Allyn had initially been reluctant about, but when the group said they would only be going to the hatchery, he consented, trusting the group to keep their word. At some point during the hatchery trip on October 2, the 11 members of the group plus Josallyn and Jaryd decided to take an early afternoon hike up the Big South Trail, 15 miles (24 km) west of the resort. It is unclear why this decision was made, although Allyn noted that the beautiful weather may have been a factor, stating that it was "one of those gorgeous fall bluebird days in the mountains of Colorado." Reports vary widely on the exact events that occurred on the trail leading up to Jaryd's disappearance. It is generally declared that the group split into faster and slower-paced groups on the trail, and that Jaryd ran ahead of the group he was with. The boy reportedly stopped to chat with two fishermen, who told investigators that they did not think much about Jaryd being alone, since they had seen a group about 50 to 80 feet (15 to 24 m) down the trail, unaware that Jaryd was not related to any of them. The last the fishermen saw of Jaryd, he was walking rapidly up the trail near adjacent campsites.

The members of the Christian Singles Network group, as well as Josallyn, heard a loud scream not long after this. According to Josallyn, the scream had little context, as it sounded both like "somebody getting attacked or somebody playing with someone... a playful scream, like someone was going up to tag [Jaryd]." The group members searched for Jaryd for roughly an hour, then returned to the resort to inform Allyn about the disappearance. Allyn broke down mentally, getting into his vehicle while beating his own chest and screaming repeatedly, "they lost my baby, they lost my baby." The resort manager called the Larimer County Sheriff's Office, and a Search and Rescue team was deployed, some of whom comforted Josallyn and allowed her to pet one of the search dogs. Bill Nelson, now a retired undersheriff with the Larimer County Sheriff's Office, was in charge of the search for Jaryd. "Absolutely, I thought we would find him," he said. "Yes, it was a young child, but my thought was we should be able to get in there with our people and do what we do and what we have done hundreds of times: find the person. It might take a few hours to find the child crying or hiding someplace nearby, but we would be done before midnight." Nelson went to his vehicle for a quick nap just before midnight and told his staff to wake him when they found the boy. When he awoke the next morning in the front seat of his pickup truck, he became concerned, realizing that Jaryd still had not been located.

== Initial search ==
An extensive search for Jaryd Atadero took place, but the search itself was hindered by multiple difficulties, including a building media frenzy. Furthermore, the helicopter used in the search for Jaryd crashed, severely injuring the team on-board and destroying the helicopter itself. Searchers combed river banks and up steep slopes. Dive teams peered into small pools left in the narrow, slow-moving river. A plane made passes overhead, but was unable to locate Jaryd. "It became a tornado, a hurricane, the biggest storm in all of our lives," Allyn Atadero stated. "I was critical of them at the time because when you are in a survival situation, you want everything that can be done to be done, and at times I thought there was so much more they could have done." With no sign of the boy appearing, the search gradually ended, and the case went cold.

Larimer County Sheriff Justin Smith was a sergeant with the department during the search, and recalled the intensity of media sensationalism surrounding Jaryd's disappearance. TV trucks and newspaper reporters compared the case to the death of local glitz pageant winner JonBenét Ramsey, another Colorado-based child cold case. "I remember from moment one that second day, we quickly realized what we were up against," Smith said.

We had searchers down who they were bringing out on stretchers, we had a missing kid overnight, we had the Air Force closing off the crash site. Emotionally it was overwhelming, and you could see it in the eyes of everybody involved. TV satellite trucks, 17 at one time, lined up along Colorado Highway 14 with anchors in fur coats walking around and anybody and everybody calling us for information. Psychics professed to know where searchers could find Jaryd. A bare-footed man with a donkey showed up at the search site, ready to track [Jaryd] down. An American Indian came to perform a ritual, asking the mountain to give up the boy.

== Discovery of human remains ==
On June 4, 2003, businessmen Robert Osborne and Gary Watts were hiking together in the Poudre Canyon area near the Big South Trail and came across several items of clothing, including a brown polar fleece sweater, a pair of blue trousers, and the Disney's Tarzan sneakers that Jaryd had been wearing when he disappeared. They photographed the items and notified authorities of their discovery the following day. On June 14, Larimer County Search and Rescue personnel located a human molar and a large piece of fractured human skull that they suspected were Jaryd's remains. DNA testing at the time revealed that the remains were 86% likely to be Jaryd's; more modern DNA testing revealed that the remains were 100% Jaryd's. In October 2003, the Larimer County Coroner's Office signed Jaryd's death certificate, ruling that his death was "probably caused by a mountain lion". His family held a memorial service on November 20.

Rather than bury or cremate the remains, Allyn Atadero decided to keep them, creating a shrine to Jaryd out of his old bedroom, kept exactly as it was before he disappeared, with the skull piece kept atop Jaryd's favourite toys and belongings. According to Allyn, "I am at peace and I know I am going to see Jaryd again one of these days. I'm going to look at him and say, 'Jaryd, what happened?' He's going to look at me and say, 'dad, does it really matter?'" In Allyn's published book, Missing: The Jaryd Atadero Story: A Father Turns Tragedy Into Hope After the 1999 Disappearance of His Son in the Colorado Mountains, he discussed his motivations for keeping Jaryd's skull piece, as well as his religious beliefs aiding him in his decisions surrounding how to best handle the remains and memorial of the boy.

== Theories ==
There are two main theories surrounding the death of Jaryd Atadero.

=== Mountain lion ===
The general consensus of the case is that Jaryd Atadero was killed and eaten by a large animal, presumably a mountain lion. However, there is contention around this theory. According to Allyn, experts on big cats in Colorado had told him that a mountain lion would have attacked the boy's stomach first, aiming for the internal organs, yet Jaryd's sweater showed no signs of such an attack. Moreover, the boy's trousers were turned inside-out, something that a mountain lion would not have done, and the Tarzan sneakers showed only minimal wear, with no sign of having been dragged, indicating that a mountain lion could not have dragged the boy's body all the way up the trail that far into the mountains without destroying the sneakers. Authorities located mountain lion tracks next to Jaryd's tracks in the initial search. According to Allyn Atadero, "[the search team] found some cougar prints coming down toward his tracks, and where the cougar prints and a little person's prints come together, the child's prints disappear." At the time that Allyn had stated this, another initial theory had existed that Jaryd may have slipped and fallen, either getting caught in the rocky terrain and dying from exposure or dying from the fall. This theory has been largely ruled out, although not completely considered implausible by authorities.

=== Abduction ===
One other existing theory is that Jaryd was abducted and murdered by somebody who had captured him, then disposing of the boy's clothing. This was backed up by the note that a human being could have turned the trousers inside-out. The only damage to the trousers had come from rodents and birds yanking away large pieces of the fabric to weave into their nearby nests. Although family and friends were questioned, there was no indication otherwise that anybody, at least anybody immediately known to the Atadero Family, had taken Jaryd.

== Claim of being Jaryd ==
Allyn Atadero was harassed by a man claiming to be Jaryd himself, and Allyn took out a restraining order on this individual; when the restraining order was violated, the man was arrested. The discovery of Jaryd's remains and the DNA match invalidated the man's claims, and it is believed by authorities that the man was mentally ill or trying to seek attention of some sort. As of 2022, the case remains officially unsolved.

== Legacy ==
Two books have been published surrounding the Jaryd Atadero case, Missing: The Jaryd Atadero Story: A Father Turns Tragedy Into Hope After the 1999 Disappearance of His Son in the Colorado Mountains, and also Missing: When the Son Sets: The Jaryd Atadero Story.

Jaryd Atadero's death prompted Governor Bill Ritter of Colorado to declare September 8 as Recreational Safety Awareness Week in honour of Jaryd Atadero. Allyn Atadero was given the opportunity to give the proclamation from Governor Ritter to assistant principal Lori Perry-Crumrine of Falcon Bluffs Middle School, where Allyn also worked as a teacher.

== See also ==
- Death of Azaria Chamberlain
- Death of Maddox Derkosh
- Disappearance of Alfred Beilhartz
- Killing of JonBenét Ramsey
- List of fatal cougar attacks in North America
- List of solved missing person cases: 1950–1999
- List of unsolved deaths
