= List of fatal snake bites in the United States =

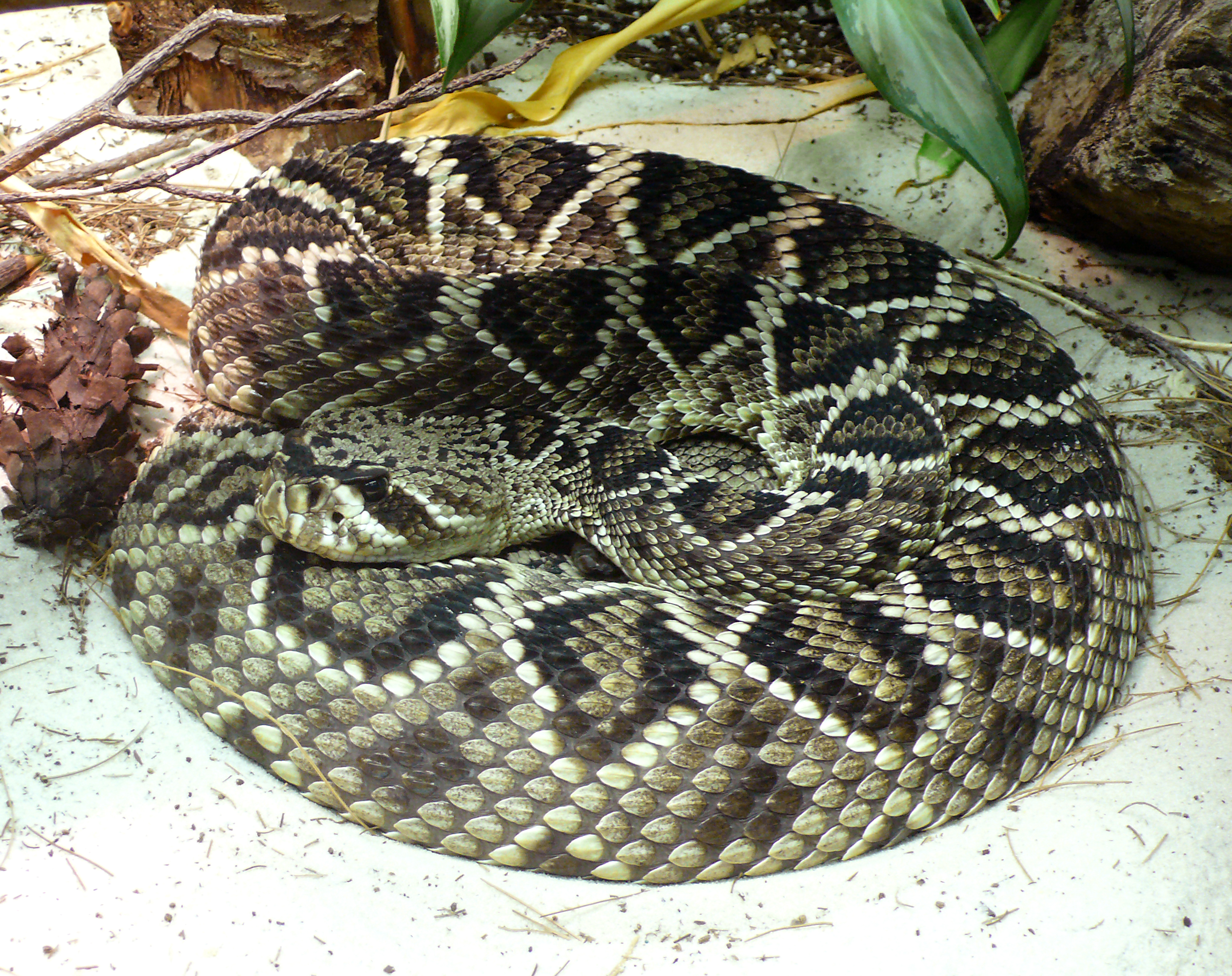
The eastern diamondback rattlesnake (Crotalus adamanteus) kills the most people in the US, with the western diamondback rattlesnake (Crotalus atrox) ranking second. However, some authorities believe the western diamondback is responsible for the most deaths.

This is a list of human deaths caused by snakebites in the United States by decade in reverse chronological order. These fatalities have been documented through news media, reports, cause-of-death statistics, scientific papers, or other sources.

== Snake species ==
The United States has about 30 species of venomous snakes, which include 23 species of rattlesnakes, three species of coral snakes, and four species of American moccasins. At least one species of venomous snake is found in every state except Hawaii, Maine, and Alaska.

Roughly 7,000–8,000 people are bitten by venomous snakes each year in the United States, and about five of those people die. Though most fatal bites are attributed to rattlesnakes, the copperhead accounts for more snakebites than any other venomous North American species. Rattlesnake bites are roughly four times as likely to result in serious injury or death as a copperhead bite.

== 21st century ==
=== 2020s ===
Date	Victim	Species	Location — Circumstances
April 10, 2026	Unknown, 78, female	Unknown	California, Redwood Valley - Unknown woman bit three times while walking on a rural property on April 8, treated at a hospital, but died two days later.
March 14, 2026	Gabriela Bautista, 46, female	Rattlesnake	California, Ventura County – Bautista was bitten at Wildwood Regional Park in Thousand Oaks. She was airlifted to a hospital, but died five days later.
February 1, 2026	Julian Hernandez, 25, male	Rattlesnake	California, Orange County — Hernandez was bitten while mountain biking at Quail Hill Trailhead in Irvine. He became comatose, and died on March 4, 2026.
August 8, 2025	adult male	Timber rattlesnake	Tennessee, Grundy County — A man hiking in Savage Gulf State Park picked up a snake and was bitten on a hand. Rescuers performed CPR and transported the victim to a hospital where he died.
August 3, 2022	William H. "Marty" Martin, 80, male	Timber rattlesnake	West Virginia, Harpers Ferry — Martin, a snake researcher, was bitten by a captive snake at his home.
July 5, 2022	Simon Currat, 6, male	Rattlesnake	Colorado, Colorado Springs — Currat was bitten while riding his bike with his family in Bluestem Prairie Open Space. He collapsed immediately and paramedics were summoned. Despite medical treatment, he died five days later at Children's Hospital Colorado.
April 30, 2022	Eugene Roberto DeLeon, 60, male	Rattlesnake	Texas, Freer — DeLeon, a "veteran snake handler" with Snake Busters Snake Handlers was bitten by a rattlesnake on April 30, 2022, while performing at an annual show in Freer, according to his family. DeLeon was flown to a hospital in Corpus Christi where he later died.
January 19, 2022	David Riston, 49, male	Unknown	Maryland, Pomfret — Riston was found dead in his home in which he kept 124 snakes including black mambas, cobras, and rattlesnakes. The Maryland Department of Health confirmed that he died of snake envenomation.
May 16, 2020	Alyssa Johnson, 3, female	Rattlesnake	Nevada, Winnemucca — At 3 pm, Johnson was bitten in the leg at Sonoma Canyon recreation area in the Sonoma Range, south of Winnemucca. She arrived at the Winnemucca hospital within an hour. At 7 pm Johnson was stable and not given antivenin when she was transferred to a Reno hospital, arriving at 10 pm. During the drive, her condition worsened. At Reno, she suffered cardiac arrest and was given antivenin, but as this was outside the recommended six hour window, her condition worsened and she died.

=== 2010s ===
Date	Victim	Species	Location — Circumstances
June 12, 2019	Priscilla Meridith, 62, female	Timber rattlesnake	Georgia, Waverly — Meridith was bitten by a rattlesnake while in a friend's garden on May 17 when she went to sit down. She was in a medically induced coma for several weeks until her death on June 12. Meridith was not able to receive antivenom due to her allergies, which doctors said would have put her life at risk.
May 25, 2019	Oliver "Chum" Baker, 52, male	Copperhead	Alabama, Winston County — Baker was at his home near Lewis Smith Lake when he was bitten by a copperhead snake and lost consciousness within 2 minutes. CPR was performed and he was taken to a local hospital in critical condition. Baker was later airlifted to Huntsville Hospital, where he died on May 27.
June 4, 2018	Lawrence Walters, 70, male	Rattlesnake	South Dakota, Lawrence County, Spearfish — Walters was playing golf at the Elkhorn Ridge Golf Course in Spearfish. He was looking for a ball in tall grass when he was bitten on the ankle. He was rushed back to the clubhouse in a cart where another employee performed CPR until an ambulance arrived, but was pronounced dead at Spearfish hospital.
April 29, 2018	Barry Lester, 57, male	Rattlesnake	Oklahoma, Osage County — Lester was driving down a road when he spotted the rattlesnake. He tried to move it to safety but was bitten on both hands. Lester collapsed shortly thereafter and was pronounced dead.
October 7, 2017	Daniel Hohs, 31, male	Rattlesnake	Colorado — Hohs was bitten on the ankle while hiking near Golden. He was taken to a local hospital in critical condition and was pronounced dead the following day.
June 12, 2016	Wayne Grooms, 71, male	Rattlesnake (likely timber rattlesnake)	South Carolina — Grooms was in the Santee National Wildlife Refuge when a rattlesnake bit his lower left leg. He collapsed and died within 15 minutes. He may have had an undisclosed condition which contributed to the severity of his reaction to the bite.
July 28, 2015	John David Brock, 60, male	Unknown (likely timber rattlesnake)	Kentucky — Brock, a preacher from Stoney Fork, was bitten in the left arm during a religious service at the Mossie Simpson Pentecostal Church in Jenson, Kentucky. He refused treatment and died in his brother's home.
July 19, 2015	Russell E. Davis, 39, male	Timber rattlesnake	Pennsylvania — Davis was sitting by a fire at his family's camp in Elk County when he was bitten by a rattlesnake. He was taken to a hospital and from there airlifted to a Pittsburgh-area hospital. While in the helicopter, Davis suffered a cardiac arrest and was subsequently pronounced dead upon arrival to the hospital. The cause of death was an anaphylactic reaction from the snake's venom. No autopsy was performed and the death was ruled accidental.
July 14, 2015	Grant Thompson, 18, male	Monocled cobra	Texas — Thompson was found unresponsive in his car in a Lowe's store parking lot in Austin. He was taken to a hospital where he was pronounced dead. A monocled cobra that he was known to own was missing and was later found dead nearby, having been run over by a car. An autopsy was performed and Thompson's death was ruled a suicide.
May 23, 2015	Gilbert De Leon, 37, male	Cottonmouth	Missouri — De Leon was bitten on each leg while wading in the James River near Nixa. After the bite, he did not seek medical attention and died the next day. The county coroner stated the cause of death listed on the death certificate states "Undetermined" because De Leon also had a lethal level of the narcotic oxycodone in his system, along with alcohol and a non-lethal level of hydrocodone.
May 20, 2015	David Giles, 59, male	Rattlesnake (Suspected)	Georgia — Giles, of Watkinsville was bitten while he was alone in Arnoldsville. He normally carried a snakebite kit but did not have it with him this time. He drove to a nearby house to seek help, and collapsed.
July 8, 2014	Timothy Levins, 52, male	Copperhead	Missouri — While camping at Sam A. Baker State Park, Levins walked outside, saw a snake, and brought it to his son's attention. When he picked it up, the snake bit him. Levins walked back into the cabin, washed his hand at the kitchen sink and sat down on the couch. When he became sick, someone from a neighboring cabin came over to help and performed CPR. Levins was later pronounced dead at an area hospital.
June 20, 2014	Brayden Bullard, 4, male	Timber rattlesnake	Florida — Bitten while planting watermelons in his backyard in Bryceville. He was rushed to the hospital, but died 2 weeks later
February 15, 2014	Jamie Coots, 42, male	Rattlesnake	Kentucky — Coots was bitten on the right hand during a service at his Full Gospel Tabernacle in Jesus Name church in Middlesboro. After the bite, Coots dropped the snakes, but then picked them back up and continued the ceremony. Later, he was driven to his home. When paramedics arrived, his relatives refused medical treatment for him, saying it was inconsistent with his religion. He died at home.
September 20, 2013	Daniel Frank Mitchell, 53, male	Rattlesnake (probably eastern diamondback, but possibly timber)	Alabama, Salem — A man died after a bite.
July 2, 2013	Ernest Burch, 80, male	Timber rattlesnake	Georgia — Burch found the snake in his garage in Armuchee, Georgia. Not wanting to kill it, he tried moving it out with a broom but lost his balance, fell on top of the snake, and was bitten on his left arm. He was rushed to the hospital and received eight vials of antivenom, but died 30 hours later.
October 2, 2012	Jack Redmond, 70, male	Unknown	Virginia — He was likely killed by one of the 24 venomous snakes he kept in his home in Chesterfield.
July 2012	Terry Brown, 50, male	Copperhead	Missouri — Brown died of a heart attack one day after he was bitten by a copperhead snake while camping on the Current River, Missouri. The coroner's office listed the cause of death as a heart attack, with the snake bite as a contributing factor. Witnesses told investigators that Brown had seen a snake in one of the tents and was trying to remove it when the snake bit him on the right thumb.
May 28, 2012	Mark Randall Wolford, 44, male	Timber rattlesnake	West Virginia — Wolford was bitten on the thigh while handling a timber rattlesnake as part of an outdoor religious service at Panther State Forest in McDowell County. Wolford did not initially seek medical treatment for his injury, but was taken to Bluefield Regional Medical Center when his condition began to deteriorate some eight hours later. Wolford was a pastor and often handled his pet snake during church services. Wolford's father, Mack Wolford, died in 1983 under similar circumstances.
June 2011	Aleta Stacy, 56, female	Black Mamba (Presumably)	New York — Found dead in her home in Putnam Co., NY. She illegally kept numerous venomous snakes in her home, one of which was a Black Mamba.
April 5, 2011	Mark Shaw, 47, male	Rattlesnake (probably western diamondback, but possibly timber)	Texas — Shaw was bitten by a rattlesnake he was trying to kill in Bastrop County.
January 29, 2011	Wade Westbrook, 26, male	Copperhead	Tennessee — Westbrook was bitten just above the right elbow while handling a copperhead; he had been attempting to determine the snake's sex. According to witnesses, he "tried to extract the venom with a tool after he was bitten, then he began coughing and vomiting before he collapsed." Westbrook was pronounced dead on arrival at Erlanger Hospital in Chattanooga. The cause of death was determined to be "anaphylactic shock as a result of the snake bite." Westbrook had been bitten previously by a copperhead, which may have made him hypersensitive to snake venom.
October 13, 2010	William Price, 67, male	Rattlesnake, probably a Southern Pacific rattlesnake	California — Price was bitten above the right ankle while wading across a stream near Cuyamaca Reservoir in Cuyamaca, California. He had been taking part in a study of steelhead trout that was funded by a state Department of Fish and Game grant. According to witnesses, Price "stopped breathing within minutes" of being bitten. The bite marks on his foot were reportedly an inch and a half across. Price was airlifted to Palomar Medical Center, but later died.
Aug. 11, 2010	Peyton Hood, 1, female	Western diamondback rattlesnake	Texas — Accidentally stepped on baby Western Diamondback while climbing down ladder at Possum Kingdom Lake. The snake struck her main artery. She was rushed to the hospital, but died within a few hours.
May 21, 2010	Eddie Lee Dorminey, 82, male	Rattlesnake	Georgia, Enigma — Dorminey was changing a lawnmower belt when he was bitten several times on his wrist.
May 9, 2010	George Yancy, 35, male	Rattlesnake (probably western diamondback, but possibly timber)	Texas — Yancy was bitten while pulling up his pants in Smithville.

=== 2000s ===
Date	Victim	Species	Location — Circumstances
October 10, 2009	Richard Rupert, 68, male	Timber rattlesnake	Georgia — Rupert was hunting with his grandson in Oglethorpe County.
~ May 23, 2008	Pamela Summers, 47, female	Timber rattlesnake (likely)	North Carolina — After being treated for a presumed Timber rattlesnake bite (due to species endemic to the area and bite characteristics) she received on her right leg while trimming weeds in her yard on or about Friday, May 23, 2008, Summers spent the night in a local ER ICU and returned home the following day with aftercare instructions. Summers was discovered dead in her Marion home a few days later on Memorial Day, May 26, 2008, apparently due to complications from the bite.
January 29, 2008	James David Bear, 37, male	Timber rattlesnake	Texas — Bitten on his right thumb at his mobile house. The canebrake rattlesnake that bit him was one of 179 snakes he kept and bred in various containers and 84 of the snakes were venomous species.
October, 2007	Jackie Ledwell, 63, female	Mojave rattlesnake	Arizona — Ledwell was bitten while taking a walk in Paulden.
September 1, 2007	Douglas John Hiler, 48, male	Timber rattlesnake	Georgia — Hiler was bitten on his left hand while attempting to cut off the rattles from what he thought was a dead snake that he came across in the road while driving near Cleveland. Medical help was summoned immediately but took 45 minutes to arrive. He survived in intensive care for 42 days before succumbing to the effects. He was reportedly very allergic to bee stings and poison ivy.
November 5, 2006	Linda Long, 48, female	Rattlesnake	Kentucky — Long died after being bitten by a snake during a serpent-handling service at church in London.
June 10, 2006	Inocencio Hernandez-Hernandez, 29, male	Eastern coral snake	Florida — Hernandez-Hernandez became the first person to die in the United States from a fatal coral snake bite since 1967. He and Jesus Moreida, both of Bonita Springs, were bitten by a coral snake they tried to kill.
October 2005	Joe Guidry, 54, male	Eastern diamondback rattlesnake	Florida — Guidry, the Putnam County, fire marshal, went to help a neighbor who had spotted a rattlesnake while mowing grass. He shot at the snake; it went under a shed, and Guidry was bitten when he reached for it.
September 12, 2005	Marcus Wolf, 35, male	Rattlesnake	Arizona — Wolf, a German tourist, was bitten while hiking near Willcox.
July 2005	Margaret Wilson White, 54, female	Rattlesnake	Texas — White was bitten in Hays County, near Wimberley along Ranch to Market Road 12, about 0.25 mi (0.40 km) west of County Road 213.
September 6, 2004	Alexandria Hall, 44, female	Urutu pit viper (Bothrops alternatus)	Ohio — Bitten at her home and died two days later from bleeding in the brain.
June 20, 2004	Trent Leprette, 31, male	Copperhead	Alabama — Leprette was bitten on each hand while swimming in Saugahatchee Creek near Loachapoka, on June 16, 2004. He was admitted to East Alabama Medical Center in Opelika; he developed complications and died after several days of treatment.
April 12, 2004	Dwayne Long, 45, male	Rattlesnake	Virginia — Rev. Dwayne Long was bitten in a finger by a rattlesnake during a religious service at his church in Rose Hill, Lee County on April 11, 2004. He did not seek medical treatment and died the next day.
August 5, 2003	Michael Peterman, 34, male	Rhinoceros viper	Ohio — Peterman, a 14-year veteran of the Dayton, Ohio Fire Department, an "experienced snake and lizard collector and the 'go to' guy for the facility's envenomation issues", was bitten by a rhinoceros viper from his personal collection. He was taken to UC Medical Center / University Hospital in Cincinnati, Ohio, and died the following day due to an ostensible / reported inability to locate the requisite antivenin for the species, despite the likelihood of what should have been normal bite protocol preparation / supply storage for a collector of Peterman's reputation and stature as well as his affiliation with the Dayton, Ohio EMS / Fire Department and his close proximity to the Cincinnati Zoo, which housed a significant herpetological collection of its own. The rhino viper was removed and rehoused with the Kentucky Reptile Zoo in Slade, KY, after Peterman's death.
May 2003	Ross Cooke, 50, male	Southern Pacific rattlesnake	California — Cooke was killed in Lytle Creek, San Bernardino County, having stepped on a snake he mistook for a log.
August 2002	Pat Hughes, 45, male	Rattlesnake	Arizona — Hughes was bitten on the finger by a small snake in his own garage. He was admitted to Sierra Vista Regional Health Center in Sierra Vista, and treated with antivenom, but died of "complications associated with the bite".
August 31, 2001	Audrey McIntosh, 18, female	Crotalid	Georgia — McIntosh, of Folkston, was doing laundry inside her home on August 31, 2001, when she was bitten. According to Ray Morgan, director of emergency management services for Charlton County, McIntosh ran nearly 0.5 mi (0.80 km) to a neighbor's house to call authorities because she didn't have a telephone. The snake escaped, so EMS officials could not determine what type it was other than to establish that it was a crotalid (pit viper). McIntosh was flown to Shands Hospital in Jacksonville, where she later succumbed to the effects of the envenomation.
September 16, 2000	Derek Lema, 2, male	Eastern diamondback rattlesnake	Florida — Lema was bitten in the thigh by a rattlesnake while helping his father, Victor Lema, in their Lakewood Ranch backyard.
August 29, 2000	Darrell Fee, 45, male	Timber rattlesnake	Tennessee — Darrell Fee, a resident of Rose Hill, Virginia, was bitten in the chest by a timber rattlesnake during a religious service at a church near LaFollette. He did not seek medical treatment and did not want the authorities in the area to find out about the snakebite he received. He later died from the snakebite.

== 1990s ==
Date	Victim	Species	Location — Circumstances
December 17, 1999 (Reported)	Anita Finch, 33, female	Gaboon viper or hog-nosed sand viper	California — Finch was bitten by either of these snakes she kept as pets in her Van Nuys, home.
October 3, 1998	John Wayne "Punkin" Brown Jr., 34, male	Rattlesnake	Alabama — Brown was bitten while handling rattlesnake during a religious service in Macedonia. He had reportedly survived 22 previous snake bites. Brown's wife, Melinda, had been killed by a snake during a religious service three years earlier, in August 1995. The Browns left five children orphaned.
December 14, 1997	Daril Ray Collins, 23, male	Rattlesnake (probably)	Kentucky — Collins was bitten during a religious service in the community of Arjay, Bell County.
August 8, 1995	Melinda Brown, 28, female	Rattlesnake	Kentucky — Brown was bitten while handling a snake during a religious service in Middlesboro, on August 6, 1995. She died two days later. Brown's husband, John Wayne "Punkin" Brown, was killed by snake during a religious service in 1998.
March 8, 1995	Kale Saylor, 77, male	Rattlesnake	Kentucky — Saylor, a Pentecostal preacher, was bitten while handling a rattlesnake during a religious service in Bell County. Saylor figured prominently in David Kimbrough's 2002 book, Taking Up Serpents: Snake Handlers of Eastern Kentucky
January 15, 1995	Dewey Bruce Hale, 40, male	Rattlesnake	Georgia — Hale was bitten on the hand while removing a rattlesnake from a box during a religious service in Enigma. He refused medical treatment and died nine hours later at his home.
May 29, 1992	Brian Leslie West, 25, male	Indian cobra	Maryland — Mr. West, who resided in Emmitsburg, had a state permit to keep more than two dozen snakes. He was tending an Indian Cobra in his basement when the snake bit him on the foot. Five minutes later he went into cardiac arrest and never awoke. He was pronounced dead an hour later at Frederick Memorial Hospital.
December 2, 1991	Ray Johnson, 52, male	Timber rattlesnake	West Virginia — Johnson, a resident of Galax, Virginia, was bitten twice in his left wrist by a timber rattlesnake in the Church of the Lord Jesus in Jolo. He refused medical treatment and died thirteen hours later.
July 13, 1991	Jimmy Ray Williams Jr, 28, male	Timber rattlesnake	Tennessee — Jimmy Ray Williams Jr, a resident of Spring Creek, North Carolina, died after being bitten by a timber rattlesnake during a religious service in the House of Prayer in Jesus Name in Morristown. His father died in 1973 after drinking strychnine during a religious service in the nearby Carson Springs Holiness Church in Jesus Name.
April 9, 1990	Arnold Loveless, 48, male	Rattlesnake	Georgia — Arnold Lee Loveless died after being bitten in the jaw by a rattlesnake during a religious service at the Church of Jesus Christ in Cartersville.

== 1980s ==
Date	Victim	Species	Location — Circumstances
August 19, 1989	Curtis Davison, 22, male	Eastern diamondback rattlesnake	Florida — Davison was bitten on the top of his right hand as he transferred a 6 ft (1.8 m) rattlesnake from one cage to another at Silver Springs Nature Park near Ocala.
March 25, 1987	Glenn R. Alexander, 29, male	Rattlesnake	Texas — Alexander was bitten during the 23rd Annual Brownwood Rattlesnake Roundup in Brownwood, on March 21, 1987, and died four days later.
February 13, 1986	Shirley McLeary, 38, female	Eastern diamondback rattlesnake	Kentucky — Shirley McLeary of Toledo, Ohio died seven hours after being bitten multiple times by an Eastern diamondback rattlesnake during a religious service for her uncle's funeral in Baxter. She did not seek medical treatment, as the other church members were praying to perform a "faith-healing attempt" on her.
August 19, 1985	Charles Herman Prince, 47, male	Unknown	Tennessee — Rev. Charles Prince of Canton, North Carolina was bitten multiple times by a snake during a religious service in the Apostolic Church of God near Greeneville. He also drank strychnine during that religious service. He refused medical treatment and died 36 hours later.
July 1984	Richard Barrett, 50, male	Rattlesnake	Georgia — Richard Barrett was bit by rattlesnake while handling five venomous snakes during a religious service at Wade's Chapel in Cartersville. He refused medical treatment, was taken to the pastor's home nearby the church, died approximately seven hours later.
August 28, 1983	Mack Ray Wolford, 39, male	Timber rattlesnake	West Virginia — Wolford was bitten on the arm by a timber rattlesnake during religious services at the Lord Jesus Temple in Mile Branch, near Iaeger. Wolford did not initially seek medical treatment. An ambulance was summoned eight hours after Wolford had been bitten, but he died during transport to Stevens Clinic in Welch, West Virginia. Wolford's son, Mark Wolford, died in 2012 under similar circumstances.
August 1982	John Holbrook, 38, male	Rattlesnake	West Virginia — Reverend Holbrook was bitten while handling a rattlesnake during religious services in Oceana. Holbrook reportedly refused medical assistance because his religion did not permit it.
September 1980	Claude Amos, 32, male	Rattlesnake	Kentucky — Claude Amos, a 32-year-old strip-mine employee, died of a rattlesnake bite suffered at a fundamentalist church where members handle snakes as part of their services in Hyden.

== 1970s ==
Date	Victim	Species	Location — Circumstances
May 31, 1976	Gregory Lee Hall, 3, male	Copperhead	Alabama — Bitten on the right hand by a copperhead he picked while playing near his home in Jacksonville, on May 31, 1976.
May 1976	Curtis Mounts, 62, male	Cottonmouth	West Virginia — Mounts was bitten twice in the arm by a cottonmouth and drank strychnine during a religious service in Mingo County.
April 2, 1974	Richard Lee Williams, 33, male	Eastern Diamondback Rattlesnake	West Virginia — Rev. Williams, of Columbus, Ohio, was bitten while handling a snake during a religious service in Switzer, on April 4, 1974.
October 28, 1973	Shirley Wagers, 72, male	Rattlesnake	Kentucky — Wagers was bitten by a rattlesnake during a religious service in the Pentecostal Holiness Church near London. He died from the bite nearly eight hours later at his home.
August 5, 1973	Gordon D. Ball, 34, male	Rattlesnake	New York — Ball was presumably bitten by a snake, possibly a massasauga, while traveling alone through Bergen-Byron Swamp on a "picture-taking expedition". A five-day police search recovered Ball's body from a small clearing "near Warboys Road, on the swamp's northern perimeter." An autopsy report listed snakebite as the presumptive cause of death.
September 24, 1972	Beulah Bucklen, 59, female	Rattlesnake	West Virginia — Bucklen, of Charleston, West Virginia, was bitten while handling a snake during a religious service in Fraziers Bottom, on September 16, 1972. She died eight days later.
September 13, 1972	Susan Mary Gaboury, 34, female	Eastern Diamondback Rattlesnake (Probably)	Florida — While driving near St. Augustine, Gaboury had stopped to relieve herself in the bushes beside the road. Thinking she had been pricked by a spiny plant, possibly the Spanish bayonet, she went to the emergency room, where she was treated for an allergic reaction and released. She returned home and was found dead the next morning. A snake expert determined from the size of the bite that Gaboury had likely been bitten by a diamondback rattler.
December 29, 1971	Bryan L. Bristow, 28, male	Cottonmouth	Louisiana — Bristow had been collecting snakes in a bag when he was bitten on the hand by a cottonmouth moccasin in Garyville, on December 29, 1971.

== 1960s ==
Date	Victim	Species	Location — Circumstances
February 20, 1967	James Saylor, 24, male	Rattlesnake	Kentucky — Bitten while handling a rattlesnake during a religious service in Covington, on February 19, 1967.
July 10, 1966	Wesley Howard Dickinson, 45, male	King cobra	California — An experienced herpetologist, Dickinson was bitten while force-feeding an 8 ft (2.4 m) Indian king cobra in Santa Ana, on July 10, 1966. Dickinson had previously survived bites from other cobras, rattlesnakes, a cottonmouth and a Gila monster.
August 31, 1965	Frederick A. Shannon, 43, male	Mojave rattlesnake	Arizona — Bitten on a finger of his left hand by Mojave rattlesnake while collecting specimens near Klondyke, on August 29, 1965. Shannon was one of the foremost American herpetologists, a physician and an expert on snakebite, having coauthored a manual for the U.S. armed services. He died on August 31, 1965, after being airlifted to a hospital in Los Angeles.
August 4, 1965	Donald Bebis, 1, male	Rattlesnake	Montana — 15-month-old Don Bebis was playing in the yard at his home in Cat Creek, when he was bitten on both legs on August 4, 1965.
January 27, 1964	Jerry de Bary, 37, male	African puff adder	Utah — De Bary, the director of the Salt Lake City Zoo, was bitten on the left forearm by a South African puff adder when he opened the cage to tend to the animal.
September 28, 1961	Columbia Gay Hagerman, 22, female	Timber rattlesnake	West Virginia — Hagerman was bitten on the right thumb during her first snake handling at a church service in Jolo. She declined medical assistance and died at her parents' home. Her parents had previously been bitten several times by copperheads and rattlesnakes, recovering each time without seeking treatment. Her older brother, Dewey Chafin, has been bitten by various venomous snakes over 100 times throughout his life and died in 2015 at age 82.
March 15, 1961	Jimmy Cornell, 14, male	Eastern diamondback rattlesnake	Florida — Bitten on the hand by diamondback rattler while reaching into a gopher hole in Fort Myers, on March 11, 1961. He died four days later.
August 27, 1960	Lloyd Hill, 41, male	Rattlesnake	Georgia — Hill, a pastor, was fatally bitten by a rattlesnake during a religious service at the New River Holiness Church in northwestern Berrien County.

== 1950s ==
Date	Victim	Species	Location — Circumstances
July 26, 1959	David P. Henson, 74, male	Rattlesnake	Alabama — Rev. Henson, described as an "elderly minister" in the Free Holiness Church, was bitten on the hand while handling a rattlesnake during a religious service in Robinwood. Relatives report that he had been handling snakes for "more than 30 years" and that he had survived several bites during that time.
June 10, 1958	Percy Miller Jr., 13, male	Rattlesnake	Miller, a 13-year-old boy from Bluffton, South Carolina, was reportedly bitten by a rattlesnake around June 4, 1958, and then succumbed to the effects of the bite 6 days later on June 10 at a nearby Ridgeland, South Carolina hospital, according to SC Certificate of Death #58008751.
September 26, 1957	Karl P. Schmidt, 67, male	Boomslang	Illinois — Schmidt, a renowned herpetologist, died in Chicago while documenting the effects of a venomous bite of a snake he was trying to identify. The snake was later identified as a juvenile African boomslang.
July 5, 1956	Irene Raub, 18, female	Indian Cobra	Raub, an 18-year-old woman from LaPlace, Louisiana, was bitten by an Indian Cobra on July 5, 1956, after handling the animal unsupervised at a LaPlace, Louisiana "Snake Farm" roadside attraction managed by her uncle. Raub succumbed to the effects of the bite several hours later in an iron lung at Charity Hospital in New Orleans, Louisiana. In an effort to save Raub, Bill Haast boarded a Navy jet in Miami and attempted to reach Raub in Louisiana in time for a blood transfusion but Raub died shortly after the jet took off.
August 29, 1955	Anna Marie Yost, 46, female	Rattlesnake	Tennessee — Bitten on the arm while handling a rattlesnake during a religious service in Savannah, on August 29, 1955. Her brother, Mansel Covington, a well-known snake handler, was bitten on both hands during the same service but survived. The event is recounted in writer Dennis Covington's 1995 book, Salvation on Sand Mountain.
July 25, 1955	George Went Hensley, 74, male	Unknown	Florida — Hensley died from a bite sustained while handling snakes during a religious service.
March 6, 1955	Frieda Hoxter, 25, female	Cobra	Maryland — A German immigrant to the U.S., performing as "Princess Naja" at a night club in Baltimore, was bitten by one of two cobras she used in her performance. She died at St. Joseph's Hospital, where she had been hospitalized previously for earlier snakebites.
June 15, 1954	Elouise Orr, 9, female	Rattlesnake	South Carolina — 9-year-old Elouise Orr was bitten by a rattlesnake while at her home near Ridgeland, according to SC Death Certificate Record. The attending physician noted that they began treating Elouise at approximately 9 am, one hour after the bite occurred, and that she succumbed to the effects of the bite 10 hours later at around 7 pm.
April 5, 1954	Bertha Smith, 72, female	Rattlesnake	California — Smith was bitten in the right thumb during a religious service near Long Beach on April 4, 1954. She died the next day.
June 26, 1953	Karen Perry, 1, female	Rattlesnake	California — 15-month-old Perry was playing in the backyard of her home in Tujunga, when she was bitten on the hand by a "pencil thin", 18-inch-long rattlesnake.
July 31, 1952	Elbert L. Thornton Sr., 67, male	Rattlesnake	South Carolina — Certificate of Death indicates individual was bit on July 30, 1952, in Beaufort, while working on a farm. Thornton died the next day at a Ridgeland, SC hospital.
August 18, 1951	Nathaniel Akins, 25, male	Rattlesnake	Florida — Bitten by a "giant rattlesnake" while cutting pulpwood alongside the Orlando Highway in Kissimmee, on Augusta 18, 1951.
July 15, 1951	Ruthie Craig, 50, female	Rattlesnake	Bitten on the right forearm while handling a rattlesnake during a religious service in New Hope, Alabama, on July 15, 1951.

== 1940s ==
Date	Victim	Species	Location — Circumstances
September 2, 1949	Ben Padgett, 26, male	Rattlesnake	Florida — Bitten below the left knee while cutting trees near Maxville, on September 2, 1949
July 20, 1948	Grace Olive Wiley, 64, female	Indian cobra	California — Wiley, an experienced herpetologist, who was known as the "Queen of the Cobras" for her work in the movie industry, was posing for a photograph with a juvenile cobra when she was bitten after a flashbulb startled the snake. Cypress.
July 18, 1947	Mrs. Floyd Butterbaugh, 22, Female	Timber rattlesnake	Ohio — Mrs. Butterbaugh was bitten by a timber rattler at her home on Piney Creek, 12 mi (19 km) east of Chillicothe, Ohio near the Tar Hollow State Forest. She was picking beans in her garden when she was bitten. She died the next day. This is the last known fatality from a wild snake bite in the state of Ohio.
September 4, 1945	Anna Kirk, 26, Female	Unknown	Virginia — Anna Kirk, the wife of Rev. Harvey Kirk, died three days after she got bit in the wrist thrice on September 1, 1945, during a religious service in the Faith Holiness Church in Stone Creek. She was going into labor just before dying without a physician present and her baby also died. Afterward, Rev. Kirk was arrested, convicted of involuntary manslaughter, and sentenced to three months in prison.
September 1945	Lewis Ford, 32, male	Rattlesnake	Tennessee — Ford was bitten by a rattlesnake during a religious service at the Dolly Pond Church with Signs Following near Chattanooga.
1945	Harry Skelton, 18, male	Unknown	Tennessee — Skelton died from a snake bite during a religious service in Cleveland.
June 22, 1943	Jerry Frier, 7, male	Rattlesnake	Florida — Frier died from rattlesnake bite in Lafayette County.
May 1, 1942	Dorothy Louise Key, 8, female	Rattlesnake	Florida — Bitten while walking in woods near her home in Bradenton.
July 21, 1941	Mahel Coffey, 10, female	Rattlesnake	North Carolina — Bitten by a rattlesnake while picking berries near her home in Lenoir.
June 23, 1941	John Charles Goss, 2, male	Rattlesnake	Pennsylvania — Bitten beneath the right knee while at a picnic near the city reservoir alongside the Willow Creek Highway in Bradford.
April 28, 1940	Reba Ann Cooper, 2, female	Rattlesnake	Texas — The daughter of a rancher, Cooper was bitten by a rattlesnake on a ranch near Rocksprings, Texas.

== 1930s ==
Date	Victim	Species	Location — Circumstances
September 17, 1937	Paul D. Emerson, 50, male	Rattle Snake	South Dakota — Dr. Emerson, a nationally known soil expert, was found dead on a trail 8 mi (13 km) west of Rapid City. Bitten on the left leg by a snake, Dr. Emerson had applied a tourniquet below the knee and made an incision over the wound with razor blade before he died.
July 24, 1937	Marshal Ray Weddle, 5, male	Rattlesnake	Idaho — Bitten while playing near his home in Riggins.
July 21, 1937	B.T. Walley, 34, male	Rattlesnake	Mississippi — Bitten while walking near Laurel.
June 20, 1937	Ace Hargrove, 64, male	Rattlesnake, Eastern Copperhead or Cottonmouth	South Carolina — The Columbia Record article states that Ace Hargrove, a farmer near Clio, was bitten by a rattlesnake while picking blackberries in a field near his home. The article, dated June 29, 1937, mentions that Hargrove initially thought he was stung by a wasp but then saw the snake as it slithered away. The certificate of death offers a slightly different account, stating that Hargrove was picking berries on the bank of a ditch near his home when he was bit on the right leg by a pilot snake. Both the Water Moccasin and the Eastern Copperhead have been referred to as pilot snakes historically, making a proper attribution difficult with current records.
August 13, 1936	Katie Adelle Rhode, 25, Female	Rattlesnake	South Carolina — Rhode was bitten by a rattlesnake while walking down the steps of her home in St. George. She reportedly did not feel the strike initially, but after a family member noticed blood on her ankle, the rattlesnake was found coiled near the steps. She was taken to a hospital in Summerville, but died approximately 15 hours after sustaining the bite.
May 4, 1936	Alfred Weaver, 35, male	Rattlesnake	Florida — Weaver, a 35-year-old itinerant was bitten on the hand by a rattlesnake during a "faith" demonstration at a revival service in Bartow, on May 3, 1936. He died the next day after refusing medical treatment.
July 24, 1931	Jess Correll, 28, male	Copperhead	Indiana — A farmer, Correll was bitten on the hand, while in the hay loft of his barn near Washington.

== 1920s ==
Date	Victim	Species	Location — Circumstances
June 15, 1929	Wilmer Hassinger, 15, male	Rattlesnake	Pennsylvania — Bitten while fishing along Rattling Creek near Lykens.
May 29, 1929	Maggie Collins, 33, female	Rattlesnake	Georgia — Collins died from a rattlesnake bite while picking blackberries in Grady County.
July 1928	Rebecca Nimmons, 19, female	Rattlesnake	South Carolina — Nimmons was killed by a rattlesnake in Pickens County.
August 21, 1921	Jane Lancaster, 66, female	Timber rattlesnake (Probably)	Ohio — The bite occurred in Franklin Township at Snake Hollow, near the present-day Scioto Trails State Forest, southeast of Chillicothe, in Ross County. An article in the Chillicothe Gazette explained that it could not be confirmed whether the bite Lancaster suffered was from a copperhead or rattlesnake. Given the severity of her wounds, it was likely a timber rattlesnake.

== 1910s ==
Date	Victim	Species	Location — Circumstances
August 15, 1917	Gustav A. Link, 51, male	Timber rattlesnake	Pennsylvania — Link was showing his pet timber rattlesnake to a group of University of Pittsburgh students in the taxidermy lab of Carnegie Museum. While putting the snake back into its cage, Link was bitten on his right index finger. Link was admitted to Mercy Hospital and treated. Herpetologist Raymond Ditmars sent antivenom from New York by train in the custody of a Pullman porter. Antivenom was administered 12 hours after the bite, but Link died 15 hours after the bite.
September 23, 1915	Helen Moomey, 4, female	Rattlesnake	North Dakota — Moomey died from a rattlesnake bite she received while playing with friends near her house in Billings County. The prairie rattlesnake is the only venomous snake in North Dakota.
June 1913	Two Wilson children	Prairie rattlesnake	Beach, North Dakota — The children were bitten and died while their family was sleeping on the North Dakota prairie.
July 9, 1910	Frank Stankiewicz, 57, male	Rattlesnake	Pennsylvania — Stankiewicz, a Lithuanian immigrant, trapped a rattlesnake while fishing near Nanticoke. When he attempted to pull off the rattles, the snake escaped and bit him twice.
June 26, 1911	James Stoner, ?, Male	Rattlesnake	Punxsutawney, Pennsylvania — Stoner, jealous of his wife, caught four rattlesnakes and tied them to rocks by the only bridge crossing the stream near their cabin, effectively keeping her prisoner there for five years. One night he came home intoxicated, slipped and was fatally bitten after landing on the snakes.

== 1900s ==
Date	Victim	Species	Location — Circumstances
July 9, 1907	Mary Bull, 12, female	Rattlesnake	Virginia — Bull died from a rattlesnake bite in Shenandoah County. The timber rattlesnake is the only species of rattlesnake in this region.
May 1906	Anonymous male	Unknown	Florida — A young man became seriously ill and died as a result of a snake bite while handling a snake during one of George Went Hensley's religious services in Bartow, Florida. Shortly after, the town of Bartow passed a law that banned snake handling.
September 25, 1906	Frank Benham, 2, male	Prairie rattlesnake	Colorado — Benham died from a rattlesnake bite in Adams County, Colorado, 17 mi (27 km) north of Deer Trail.
September 25, 1900	Edward Comstock, 39, male	Rattlesnake	Ohio — Comstock died as result of a bite from a rattlesnake during a snake handling exhibition on Water Street in Chillicothe. A newspaper article read: "Edward Comstock, manager of a snake show, was bitten by a rattlesnake at Chillicothe, O., last week and died, in terrible agony. His hand and arm swelled to an enormous size. Every known antidote was tried without avail. He was changing the snakes and put his hand into a box, when the rattler bit him. He had handled snakes for years."

== 18th and 19th century ==
Date	Victim	Species	Location — Circumstances
June 1891	Belinda Rourke, 6, female	Rattlesnake	Colorado — Rourke died from a bite while playing near a pile of rocks near the family's ranch in the Purgatory River Valley of southern Colorado. The child survived for a day after the bite.
c. 1890	Rebecca O. Andrews, approximately 28, female	Rattlesnake	Kansas — Andrews died from a rattlesnake bite.
July 1882	James Ananias Brannon, 2, male	Rattlesnake	Texas — Brannon died from a rattlesnake bite received while lying on a blanket.
May 30, 1873	George Sides, 6, male	Rattlesnake	Texas — Sides died in Texas of a rattlesnake bite.
1873	Frederick Louis Niemann, male	Rattlesnake	Kansas — Niemann died in Saline County, from a rattlesnake bite.
1859	William A. Perrin, male	Timber rattlesnake	Virginia — Perrin was killed by a rattlesnake at Stribling Springs in Augusta County.
October 24, 1854	Maggie Lee, female	Rattlesnake	Texas — She was the first child to die of a snakebite in Parker County.
August 15, 1841	H. M. Pettigrew, 31, male	Rattlesnake	Texas — Pettigrew died from a rattlesnake bite while clearing land in Fannin County, Texas.
1796	Richardson, infant son of Wm. & Ella	Massasauga or Timber rattlesnake (Likely)	New York — Richardson Cemetery (Town of Springport, NY)
1791	Unknown person	Timber rattlesnake	Massachusetts — This was the last fatal snakebite in the state.
August 28, 1790	Child, 5 or 6	Timber rattlesnake	Massachusetts — A child was bitten by a rattlesnake, and died the next day, in Hardwick.

== Literature ==
- Greene, Spencer C.; Folt, Jason; Wyatt, Kimberly; Brandehoff, Nicklaus P. (July 2021). "Epidemiology of fatal snakebites in the United States 1989–2018". The American Journal of Emergency Medicine. 45: 309–316. doi:10.1016/j.ajem.2020.08.083. PMID 33046301.
- Langley, Ricky; Haskell, Marilyn Goss; Hareza, Dariusz; King, Katherine (October 2020). "Fatal and Nonfatal Snakebite Injuries Reported in the United States". Southern Medical Journal. 113 (10): 514–519. doi:10.14423/SMJ.0000000000001156. ISSN 1541-8243. PMID 33005969.
- O'Neil, Mary Elizabeth; Mack, Karin A.; Gilchrist, Julie; Wozniak, Edward J. (December 2007). "Snakebite Injuries Treated in United States Emergency Departments, 2001–2004". Wilderness & Environmental Medicine. 18 (4): 281–287. doi:10.1580/06-WEME-OR-080R1.1. ISSN 1080-6032. PMID 18076294.
- Schulte, Joann et al. "Childhood Victims of Snakebites: 2000-2013." Pediatrics vol. 138,5 (2016): e20160491. doi:10.1542/peds.2016-0491
- Landry, Mariah; D'Souza, Rohan; Moss, Shannon; Chang, Howard H.; Ebelt, Stefanie; Wilson, Lawrence; Scovronick, Noah (July 2023). "The Association Between Ambient Temperature and Snakebite in Georgia, USA: A Case-Crossover Study". GeoHealth. 7 (7) e2022GH000781. Bibcode:2023GHeal...7..781L. doi:10.1029/2022GH000781. ISSN 2471-1403. PMC 10334880. PMID 37441711.
- Mullins, Michael E.; Freeman, William E.; Baumgartner, Kevin T. (September 2021). "Use of lay media for epidemiology of snakebite fatality". The American Journal of Emergency Medicine. 47: 287–288. doi:10.1016/j.ajem.2021.05.059. PMID 34083110.
- Domanski, K.; Kleinschmidt, K. C.; Greene, S.; Ruha, A. M.; Bebarta, V. S.; Onisko, N.; Campleman, S.; Brent, J.; Wax, P.; on behalf of the ToxIC North American Snakebite Registry Group (March 3, 2020). "Cottonmouth snake bites reported to the ToxIC North American snakebite registry 2013–2017". Clinical Toxicology. 58 (3): 178–182. doi:10.1080/15563650.2019.1627367. ISSN 1556-3650. PMID 31190571.

== See also ==
Snakes:

- Snakebite
- Venomous snakes
- List of dangerous snakes
- Snake handling in Christianity
- Epidemiology of snakebites

Snake bites worldwide:

- Snakebite in Latin America
- List of fatal snake bites in Australia

Individual snake attack cases:

- 2013 New Brunswick python attack
- Death of Akbar Salubiro

Lists of animal attacks:

- List of fatal alligator attacks in the United States
- List of fatal bear attacks in North America
- List of fatal cougar attacks in North America
- List of fatal dog attacks
- List of fatal shark attacks in the United States
- List of wolf attacks
