= List of fatal shark attacks in Réunion =

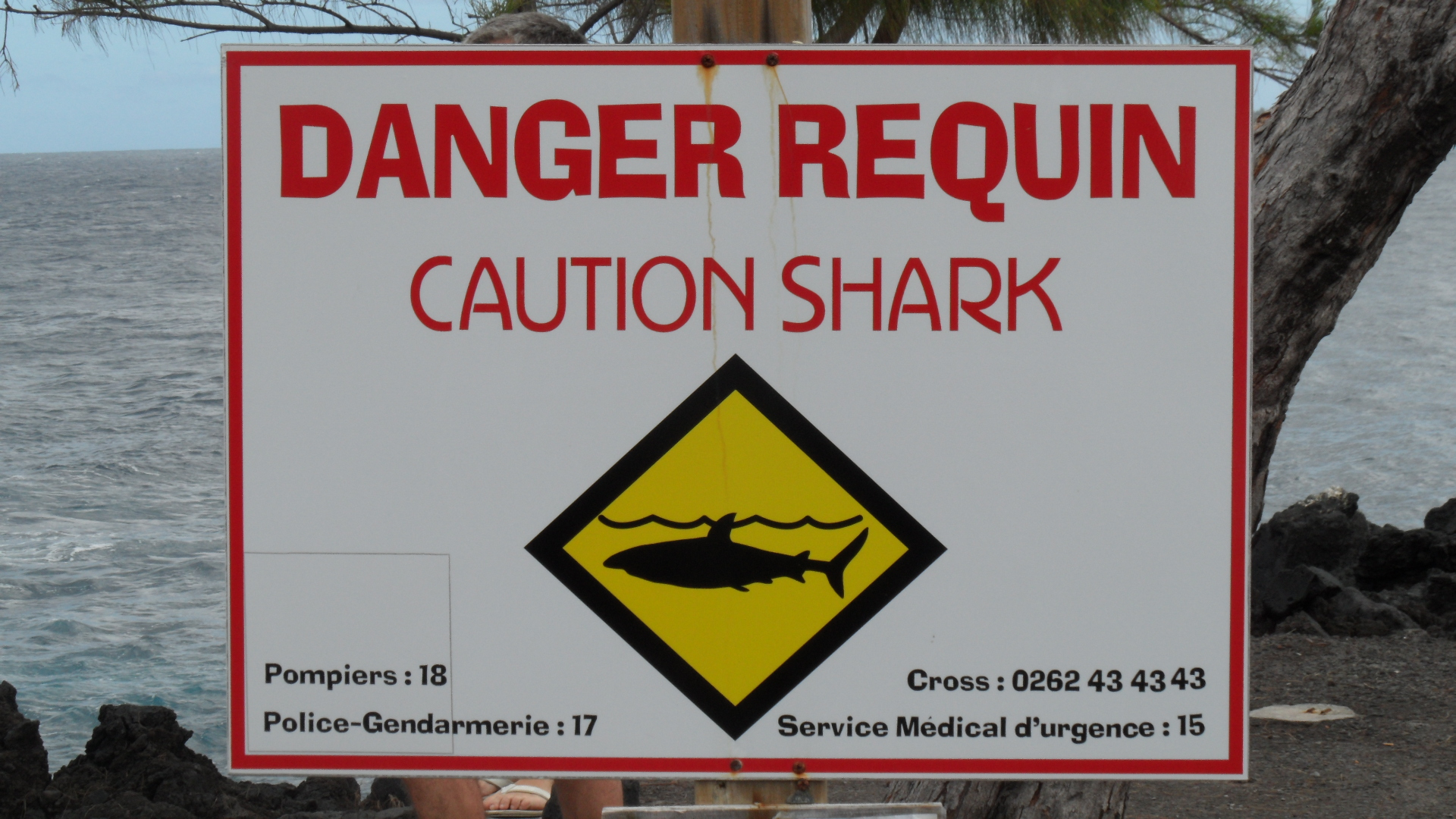
A "Danger Requin" or caution sharks sign at a beach near Saint-Denis.

This is a list of fatal shark attacks in Reunion. Réunion is an overseas department and region of France and an island in the Indian Ocean with over 207 km (128 miles) of coastline and hundreds of public and private beaches.

As of late 2018 there have been 27 fatal attacks and 56 total attacks since 1913. The island was the locale for over 16% of the world's fatal attacks from 2011 to 2016. The reason for the frequency of fatal attacks has to do with the island's tropical location. The island is situated in a so-called "shark highway" between Australia and South Africa, two countries with shark dominated waters. Many large sharks who use this shark highway find Réunion home due to its diverse aquatic ecosystem and coral reefs, offering sharks a thriving home.

A study released in 2015 showed Réunion had recorded a remarkable 3.15 shark-related deaths per one million people, by far the highest in the world. The next highest rating was that of South Africa, with 0.76 per one million residents, while the United States had a rate of 0.0013 per million.

== 2000s ==
Name	Sex	Date	Location spot	Species	Details	Ref(s)
Kim Mahbouli, 28	M	9 May 2019	Saint-Leu	unknown	Kim Mahbouli, from Paris, was fatally attacked near Réunion Island on a banned stretch of surf. Surfing in the area is heavily restricted due to a rise in shark attacks, and authorities reportedly issued warnings to steer clear of the water earlier that morning. Local officials said Mahbouli was with 3 friends, who were all wearing shark-repelling devices on their ankles, who tried but weren't able to get him to land. Mahbouli was not wearing a repelling device.	
Floris Huet, 41	M	30 January 2019	Saint Rose	unknown	Huet was fishing with seven other friends when a shark bit his leg. Huet's partners pulled him from the water, but he succumbed to his wounds.	
Elio Canestri, 13	M	12 April 2015	Cap Homard, Saint-Gilles-les-Bains	Bull shark	Canestri was surfing with friends in the morning. Lifeguards say they heard Canestri shout and went to help him, and then attempted to stop the bleeding. He was pronounced dead on arrival to the hospital.	
Talon Bishop, 22	F	14 February 2015	L'etang Sale Beach, Reunion	Tiger shark	Bishop was swimming with 12 other friends in an unknown spot when she was attacked. Her friends pulled her to shore, but her wounds were too severe and she died the following day.	
Sarah Roperth, 15	F	15 July 2013	Le cimetière marin, Saint-Paul	unknown	Roperth was on holiday and was snorkeling with a group of tourists. Based on witness accounts, she was on the outer edge of the group in 3.0-to-3.7-metre (10 to 12 ft) waters when she was attacked. A big dorsal fin of a shark was seen behind her seconds prior to the attack. She was bitten in two at the torso, with the shark carrying off the lower half. The species of the shark is unknown.	
Stéphane Berhamel, 36	M	8 May 2013	Brisant Beach, Saint-Gillies	Gray reef whaler	Berhamel was body boarding when he was attacked.	
Alexandre Rassiga, 22	M	23 July 2012	Trois-Bassins	unknown	Rassiga was surfing alone when he was attacked at approximately 3:30 p.m. He succumbed to his wounds at hospital later at night.	
Mathieu Schiller, 32	M	19 September 2011	Boucan-Cannot, Saint-Gilles	unknown	At approximately noon, Schiller's body board washed ashore with no sign of Schiller. This alerted lifeguards who at approximately 12:45 p.m. called for a full scale search. After three hours of searching, a police helicopter found Schiller's body 15 metres (50 ft) out on a 23 metres (75 ft) rock jetty. Bite wounds were discovered along his side.	
Eddie Aubert, 31	M	15 June 2011	Boucan-Cannot, Saint-Gilles-les-Bains	unknown	Aubert was attacked by an unknown species of shark while boogie boarding.	
Sébe Émond, 34	M	20 August 2006	Pointe du Diable, Saint-Pierre	Great white shark	Émond was surfing alone when he was attacked by a great white. His left leg was bitten off midway up his thigh. It is believed he drowned before he could be pulled ashore.	

== 1900s ==
Name, age	Male	Date	Location	Shark species	Details	Ref(s)
Guy Oudin, 52	M	11 April 1999	Roche-aux-Oiseaux, L' Etang Salé-les-Bains	three Bull sharks	Oudin was swept out to sea by a 21-metre (70 ft) wave while standing on a jetty. Witnesses say there were multiple dorsal fins observed around Oudin and that he was attacked nearly 91 metres (300 ft) from shore. His body wasn't recovered until April 13.	
unknown	M	3 January 1999	Off the coast of Saint-Leu	Bull shark	An unidentified male was killed while spearfishing.	
Philippe Blu, 71	M	25 January 1998	Grand'Anse	Bull shark	Blu was attacked when bathing at a private beach near his home.	
unknown	unknown	1 January 1998	Beaufonds	Bull shark	An unidentified person from Paris was killed when attacked by a bull shark near Beaufonds.	
David Lonne, 20s	M	3 January 1997	la Pointe-au-Sel	unknown	Lonne was spearfishing with a friend when they were both attacked. Lonne was pulled ashore by his injured friend but died on arrival to the hospital.	
Grégory Bénèche, 25	M	10 January 1996	Embouchure de l'étang de Saint Paul, Saint-Paul	Tiger shark	Bénèche was attacked by a 662 lbs (300 kg) tiger shark while surfing. The shark was later killed, with a $2,000 reward.	
Jerome Pruneaux, unknown	M	16 September 1996	Saint-Denis	unknown	Pruneaux was attacked while body boarding.	
Thierry Boulay, 24	M	9 July 1995	Barachois, Saint-Denis	Bull shark	Boulay was attacked by a 1.1-to-1.2-metre (3.5 to 4 ft) long shark while windsurfing.	
unknown	unknown	15 April 1994	Lieu-dit Cayenne, Saint-Joseph	Bull shark	An unidentified person was killed by a bull shark at a popular beach in Saint-Joseph.	
Theirry Mercredi, 16	M	28 June 1992	Cap de la Marianne, Saint-Paul	Lemon shark or Bull shark	Mercredi was surfing when he cut his leg on coral or a rock. Moments later he was dragged off of his board and attacked. A friend who was 61 metres (200 ft) away paddled towards Mercredi and punched the shark away. Mercedi was conscious until medical staff arrived but his condition worsened and he succumbed to his wounds hours later.	
Emmanuel Nativel, unknown	M	22 May 1992	Lieu-dit Cayenne, Saint, Joseph	Tiger shark	Nativel was killed by an 3.4-metre (11 ft) tiger shark.	
Bruno Giraud, 30s	M	19 July 1989	Temple Tamoule, Sainte-Suzanne	unknown	Giraud was attacked while surfing.	
Jean-Felix Taochyn, 25	M	28 April 1988	Embouchure de l'étang du Gol, Saint-Louis	unknown	Taochyn was attacked during an aquatic race and was the only death in the events history.	
unknown	M	1 January 1975	Saint-Denis	Great white shark	An unidentified Troupes de marine officer on holiday from mainland France was attacked by a great white while swimming.	
unknown	F	7 December 1972	Basse Vallée, Saint-Philippe	Bull shark	An unidentified woman was attacked after falling from a yacht drunk. Witnesses say sharks had been seen in the area that past week. The woman reportedly swam towards the sharks. Police reported her death a possible suicide.	
unknown	unknown	1 December 1972	Saint-Philippe	Great white shark	An unidentified person was attacked at a tourist beach in Saint-Philippe.	
unknown	M	1 January 1918	Barachois, Saint-Denis	unknown		
unknown	M	1 January 1913	Barachois, Saint-Denis	unknown	An unidentified man was attacked after he jumped into the harbor to retrieve his hat.	
unknown	M	1 January 1913	Barachois, Saint-Denis	unknown	An unidentified man was attacked while swimming. Both January 1, 1913 deaths were believed to have caused by the same shark.	

== Attack demographics ==
Percentage of fatal and non-fatal attacks in Reunion
1. Fatal attacks (47.3%)
2. Non-fatal attacks (52.7%)

=== Fatalities and attacks by species ===
#	Species	Fatalities	#	Species	Total attacks
1	unknown	11	1	Great white	17
2	Bull	8	2	Bull	14
3	Great white	4	3	unknown	9
4	Tiger	3	4	Tiger	8
5	Lemon	1	5	Lemon	5
			6	Mako	3

== See also ==
- List of fatal shark attacks in the United States
- List of fatal shark attacks in South Africa
- List of fatal shark attacks in Australia
- List of fatal shark attacks in California
