= Prairie rattlesnake =

Prairie rattlesnake may refer to:

- Crotalus viridis, a.k.a. the plains rattlesnake, a venomous pitviper species native to the western United States, southwestern Canada, and northern Mexico.
- Sistrurus catenatus, a.k.a. the massassauga, a venomous pitviper species found primarily in the United States.
