= Disappearance of Alfred Beilhartz =

1938 missing child case in the United States

Alfred Beilhartz
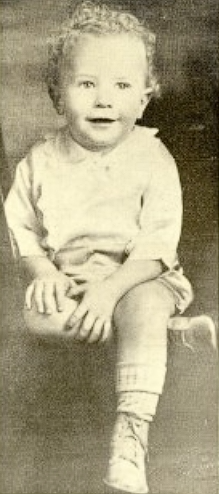
- Born: c. 1934; United States
- Disappeared: July 2, 1938 (aged 3–4); Fall River, Rocky Mountain National Park, Colorado, United States
- Status: Missing for 88 years and 8 days
- Father: William Harvey Beilhartz
- Family: 10 siblings

Locations

Alfred Edwin Beilhartz was a young boy who vanished in 1938 at Rocky Mountain National Park.

== Disappearance and search ==
Alfred was on vacation with his family, in the course of which they all went to Estes Park to fish. While hiking with his parents on a trail that ran along a creek, Alfred fell behind and vanished. Once the family could not locate Alfred after conducting a search they called in park rangers who, believing he may have drowned in the creek, dammed it and dragged the creek for his body but found nothing. Searchers then concentrated on a land search and bloodhounds were called in but stopped after walking only 500ft but again this proved fruitless and the search was called off after ten days.

== Possible sightings ==
Hikers in a different part of the park claimed that they saw a small boy on an elevation called Devils Nest on Mt. Chapin, while walking along Old Fall Road. According to the sighting, the boy sat on the edge of the elevation for several minutes before being jerked back by someone off to the side. The identity of this person has never been established. The hikers contacted park officials who sent climbers to search the clifftop but they found nothing. The search party included 150 men and members of the Civilian Conservation Corps. Some time later Alfred was supposedly sighted walking along a road with a man in Nebraska.

== Aftermath ==
A bandage found in an abandoned cabin was tested, since the child had a similar one when he vanished. A ransom note for $500 (equivalent to $11,436 in 2025) was sent to the parents after Alfred had been missing for five months; however, police determined it to be a hoax. Alfred's father believed that Alfred had been abducted but was still alive.

== See also ==
- List of people who disappeared
