= List of fatal shark attacks in the United States =

This is a list of fatal shark attacks that occurred in United States territorial waters by decade in chronological order.

== Before 1800 ==
| Name, Age | Date | Species | Location, comments |
|---|---|---|---|
| Unknown man | August 1640 | Unknown, possibly bull shark | According to Jesuit priest Father Copley, an unknown English-born laborer went into the St. Mary's River, Maryland to cool off after a hot day, a reported "huge fish" came and killed him shortly after. |
| Alexander Sampson | c. 1730 | Unconfirmed, presumed great white shark | Sampson was on a pleasure excursion in Boston Harbor, Massachusetts when a shark attacked his boat, knocked him overboard, and devoured him. |
| Unknown Male | July 27, 1751 | Unconfirmed | A swimmer was fatally attacked by a shark at an unknown location in Massachusetts. While details are scarce, the Pennsylvania Gazette documented the incident in 1751. There's speculation that this event took place off the coast of Sandwich, per WWLP. |
| Unknown Male | June 1771 | Unconfirmed, presumed great white shark | Three men were in a canoe off the coast of New England, near a place called Damiscotte (either Damariscotta, then part of Massachusetts, or Massconcus Damiscotte near present-day New Harbor), when a shark attacked the canoe, knocking one of the men into the water before biting him in two. His companions shot the shark and brought it ashore, where they cut it open and buried the man's remains. |
| Nu'u-anu-pa'ahu | 1779 | Unconfirmed, presumed tiger shark | The victim was a young male who suffered a gash to one side of his buttocks following a shark attack at Maliu, Hawaii. The victim later died of his injuries at Pololū Valley, Hawaii. |

== 1800s–1840s ==
| Name, Age | Date | Species | Location, Comments |
|---|---|---|---|
| Unidentified male | Prior to September 3, 1816 | Unknown, possibly great white shark | This young boy was swimming to shore from a boat at Bristol, Rhode Island, when a shark attacked him, pulling him under the water. A few days later, his body was found, lacking all of its limbs. |
| Jemmy | June 24, 1817 | Unknown | Jemmy, an elderly and enslaved fisherman, was swimming to a boat in Charleston, South Carolina, when a shark bit him in two just as he grabbed hold of the boat. |
| Unidentified male | 1828 | Unconfirmed, presumed to be a tiger shark | The victim was riding surf near Lahaina, Maui, Hawaii at the time of the attack. The shark bit off most or all of the victim's limbs, while his torso was left floating in the water. The attack was reportedly witnessed "by a number of Hawaiian chiefs." |
| Joseph Blaney, 52 | July 12, 1830 | Unconfirmed, presumed to be a great white shark | While fishing from a dory 5 miles (8 km) east of Scituate, Massachusetts, Blaney was seen waving and calling for help. A large shark's body or head was seen lying on or across his boat, and it appeared that one of Blaney's arms had been disabled. Another fisherman went to Blaney's assistance, but before they could get to him, the shark resumed its attack and submerged both the boat and Blaney. The boat soon resurfaced, but all that was ever found of Blaney was his hat. NOTE: A March 15, 1897, issue of the Wisconsin newspaper The Daily Northwestern reported this incident in an article called The Dangers of Fishing. According to the author, "In 1874 [about 22 years before the article was written] I was fishing off the Isles of Shoals with a cod fisherman, who told me that when his father was a young man there was a large shark that infested the coast which had on several occasions attempted to tip over boats and dine on the occupants, and once or twice [the fisherman's father] had been driven ashore by it. The date [of the fisherman's recollection] corresponded within a month with that of a tragedy which occurred about 30 miles [55.56 km] south [of the Isles of Shoals], or at Lynn, and which was undoubtedly caused by the same fish. A well-known citizen of Lynn [Blaney] went out with a fishing party, and after a short time left the schooner, taking a small dory, which he anchored not 1000 feet [304 m] from the vessel. Suddenly he was heard to shout, and those on the vessel distinctly saw a huge shark throw itself over the dory and sink it, making off with the unfortunate man, whose cries for aid were of no avail." In the previous paragraph, the author also stated that "the instance [reported] is well known and remarkable for the ferocity displayed by the fish," implying that the article's readers would know who and what was being referred to. The imprecise dating and somewhat convoluted phrasing has led some sources to mistakenly report this as a separate attack. However, in his diary entry for July 23, 1830 (eleven days after Blaney was taken), Charles Francis Adams recorded that he'd been invited "to go and see the Shark caught lately, who was supposed to have destroyed the man from Lynn," confirming that Blaney was indeed a "well-known citizen of Lynn." |
| Crew member of a pilot boat | c. 1840 | Unconfirmed, presumed to be a great white shark | Killed while treading water awaiting rescue after being accidentally thrown overboard in Charleston Harbor, Charleston County, South Carolina. Witnesses estimated the shark to be 25 feet (8 m) long. |
| Nickerson | Prior to September 10, 1845 | Unknown | Nickerson was drawing a seine net near Pensacola, Florida, when a shark seized him. |
| Mrs. Cracton, Mr. Mansfield | June 8, 1849 | Unknown | Mrs. Cracton was bathing with another woman in Pensacola, Florida, when a shark bit her and pulled her into deep water. Mr. Mansfield heard their cries and went to their assistance. He was able to rescue the other woman, but was himself killed while trying to save Mrs Cracton. Mrs. Cracton's mutilated body washed ashore the next day. Mansfield's body was never recovered, but scraps of his clothing later washed ashore, "leaving but little doubt that he was devoured by sharks." |

== 1850s–1860s ==
| Name, Age | Date | Species | Location, Comments |
|---|---|---|---|
| James Kinney | March 1851 | Tiger shark | Killed while swimming in Honolulu Harbor, Oahu, Hawaii. |
| Charles Chambers | 1852 | Unconfirmed | Killed while wading ashore from a capsized vessel in Mount Pleasant, Charleston County, South Carolina. |
| Sailor | August 1852 | Unconfirmed | This sailor attempted to desert from the USS Pennsylvania off Norfolk, Virginia. He jumped overboard with the intent of swimming ashore, but was almost immediately attacked and killed by a very large shark. |
| Unidentified Man | Prior to July 13, 1853 | Tiger shark | This man was among several others who were bathing in Charleston Harbor, South Carolina, when a large shark appeared. All the men made a break for their ship, and most managed to reach the vessel, except one, who was bitten in half "almost in reach of the oars". One of the man's friends dove into the water and killed the shark with a knife. The shark was dragged onshore and discovered to be pregnant. |
| Capt. George Jacob Hanscheldt | 1853 or 1854 | Unconfirmed | Knocked overboard and killed by a shark near Fernandina Beach, Nassau County, Florida. |
| J.G. Luther, 21 | March 16, 1859 | Unconfirmed | Luther fell overboard from the whaling ship Jeannette off Kawaihae, Hawaii. It was reported that "the sharks had eaten him up" before help could reach him. |
| Colonel Bryant | Prior to July 18, 1865 | Unconfirmed | Bryant was killed while bathing off Brazos, Texas. |

== 1870s ==
| Name, Age | Date | Species | Location, Comments |
|---|---|---|---|
| George Gates, 14 | August 8, 1878 | Unknown | Gates had gone crabbing with 16-year-old Arthur Cole at Brooklyn, New York. Gates decided to go bathing and jumped off the boat. When he surfaced, he was crying for help. Arthur saw a shark he estimated to be 8 feet (2.4 m) in length biting Gates by the hip. Arthur threw a stone at the shark, and the shark swam off. Arthur pulled Gates into the boat and rowed ashore, where Gates was taken to the hospital. Five days later, Gates died. |
| Arthur Cole, 16 | August 9, 1878 | Unknown, presumed to be a bull shark | Cole was reportedly swimming from a boat in the East River, New York City, when a shark attacked him. Cole's friend managed to pull him into the boat and paddle to shore, where he died of injuries. NOTE: It is possible that this attack is simply a repeat of the previous attack that was accidentally reported twice with slightly different details, in which Cole was the surviving companion who threw the rock at the shark and Gates was the boy who perished. |
| Gus Ericsson | Circa 1879 | Tiger shark | Ericsson was on a small boat that capsized after accidentally being struck by the sailing vessel Zephyr at the mouth of the Mississippi River, near New Orleans, Louisiana. While his other shipmates were able to cling to the capsized boat, he was flung farther away, and thrown a life ring by his shipmates. The rescue boat was just 100 feet (30 m) from him when a tiger shark raced up from the depths, seized Ericsson, and pulled him under. No trace of Ericsson was ever found. |

== 1880s ==
| Name, Age | Date | Species | Location, Comments |
|---|---|---|---|
| William Smith, 23 | June 13, 1881 | Unknown | Smith fell off the schooner Laura Lewis roughly 10 miles southwest of South Island Light, which lies at the mouth of Mobile Bay, Alabama. Before help could reach him, a shark seized him and pulled him under the water. Several sharks were caught and killed in the vicinity over the next 12 hours, but none contained Smith's remains. |
| Frank G. Hines | September 5, 1881 | Unknown | Hines was thought to have been taken by a shark while bathing in Elizabeth City, North Carolina. His body washed ashore two days later. |
| Aeronaut | 1883 | Unknown | A balloon attempted to land on the coast of South Carolina, but instead crashed into the ocean. A school of sharks proceeded to attack the aeronaut piloting the balloon. |
| Captain's Boy | Summer of 1883 | Unknown | This boy, described as "a good-sized lad", fell off the rigging as his ship came into Fort Pickens, Florida. The crewmen heard a scream and ran to the ship's rail, only to see a red cloud in the water. They managed to find the boy's body, but it was missing its head and limbs. |
| Captain Mark Robinson | July 26, 1885 | Unknown | Robinson's ship, the schooner Pohoiki, capsized off the coast of Kau, Hawaii, killing his wife and son, and leaving the crew in the water. Two sailors made it to a boat that the schooner had been towing, but before they could rescue their shipmates, sharks attacked Robinson and the remaining survivors. Robinson sustained fatal injuries to his legs, and the two sailors with him were also bitten, one of them losing most of his left arm. Robinson's body was initially recovered, but was afterwards thrown overboard. |
| James Edward Hamilton | October 18, 1887 | Unknown | Hamilton disappeared while trying to cross the Hillsboro Inlet, Pompano Beach, Florida, leaving behind his boat, mailbag, and clothes. A fisherman named Waring claimed to have seen Hamilton's boat being bitten by sharks, and while Hamilton attempted to defend himself with his oars, he was ultimately knocked out of the boat and killed. While some accounts claim that his body was never found, others state that it was discovered at the inlet minus its head and limbs. |
| Eddie Roe | Prior to July 21, 1889 | Unknown | Roe was swimming with a group of 15 other boys in Fernandina Beach, Florida, when a shark bit his calf. He died from blood loss before medical assistance was obtained. |

== 1890s ==
| Name, Age | Date | Species | Location, Comments |
|---|---|---|---|
| Male | Prior to October 6, 1894 | Unconfirmed | Two men decided to desert their ship, the Evarest, off the coast of Mobile, Alabama, and tried to swim to a skiff. Before the men reached the skiff, one of them was killed by a shark, although the other sailor managed to escape. |
| Charles Beattie, 26 | August 11, 1895 | Unknown | Beattie was fishing from a yawl roughly 1 mi (1.6 km) offshore of Weekapaug, Rhode Island, when he decided to go for a swim. Beattie was swimming away from the boat when a distressed look came across his face. His companion, Andrew Taft, attempted to rescue Beattie, but Beattie was pulled under the water and never resurfaced. It is believed he was killed by a shark. |
| Unidentified Man | 1896 | Unknown | This man was killed while swimming to shore from a "filibuster" with two other men off the coast of (presumably) Florida. |
| Nahalehau, 35 | July 25, 1896 | Unknown | Nahalehau was spearfishing "not far from shore" off Kahului, Hawaii, when his foot was bitten by a shark. He managed to drag himself ashore before dying, likely of exhaustion and blood loss. His body was found on the beach within half an hour of him last being seen alive. |
| Sailor of the Nomad | 1898 | Unknown | The schooner Nomad capsized in a storm - likely off the coast of Alaska - with the loss of all hands. Its overturned wreck later washed ashore at Kohala, Hawaii, containing the remains of a crewman partially eaten by sharks. He may have drowned before being consumed. |
| Ah Hol | October 28, 1898 | Unknown | Hol, a convict, jumped from the steamer Kinau off Kohala, Hawaii. The police officer guarding him did not inform the ship's crew until they were 1 mi (1.6 km) or more from the location. When the Kinau finally turned around to look for him, all that could be seen was Hol's straw hat and "a large shark swimming leisurely about." |
| Delano Wood, 15 | August 15, 1899 | Unconfirmed | Killed by a 10-foot (3 m) long shark while swimming in the Trout River, Panama Park near Jacksonville, Florida. |
| Five Japanese Fishermen | Prior to August 23, 1899 | Basking shark | A group of Japanese fishermen were fishing for basking sharks off Monterey, California. One shark was harpooned, and pulled two of the boats for some distance. When it stopped, seemingly exhausted, the fishermen moved their boats up alongside it. The shark then lashed out and struck the first boat with its tail, killing two men and leaving it swamped. It then hit the second boat, crushing it, and pulling it underwater. The boat resurfaced with a single survivor clinging to it - in the course of the encounter, five men had been either killed outright or drowned. |

== 1900s ==
| Name, Age | Date | Species | Location; Comments |
|---|---|---|---|
| Emil Uhlbrecht and an unidentified person | July 14, 1900 | Tiger shark | Uhlbrecht was swept out to sea while hunting seashells with friends at Makapuu Point, Oahu, Hawaii. His positively identified foot was recovered from a tiger shark measuring 11 feet 9 inches (3.58 m) long which had been caught off Kakaako, Oahu by John Kinipeki on September 17. The shark's stomach also contained a femur and pelvis thought to belong to another person, possibly one of several Chinese fishermen who had drowned in the harbor a few months prior. |
| Unidentified Coast Guard Personnel | 1900–1905 | Unconfirmed | Killed while fishing for red drum at Ocracoke Inlet, North Carolina. |
| Mail Carrier | Prior to 1902 | Unknown | This man was canoeing at Mosquito Inlet, Florida. He was swept out by a current and his boat capsized. Several days later, his body was found, with its limbs bitten off by sharks. It is possible that he drowned before being consumed. |
| Hawaiian boy | August 2, 1902 | Tiger shark | Killed while catching crabs at Kalihi, Oahu, Hawaii. Both arms were severed. |
| Phil Kitchin | c. 1903 | Tiger shark | Killed while fishing at Koko Head, Oahu, Hawaii. His foot was recovered two days later from a shark. |
| Unidentified man | 1904 | Tiger shark | Man disappeared while swimming off Diamond Head, Honolulu, Oahu, Hawaii. A shark was caught two days later with the head and body of a man (complete from the waist down with the exception of one leg) in its gut. The shark was described as "monstrous" in size. |
| Chester Kennedy | July 27, 1904 | Unconfirmed | Kennedy was swimming off the coast of Texas, perhaps in Galveston, when he shrieked and was pulled underwater. His body was never recovered. He is believed to have been killed by a shark. |
| Sutton Davis | July 29, 1905 | Unconfirmed | Killed while wading at Davis Shore, east of Beaufort, North Carolina. |
| Student | June/July 1906 | Unknown | A young student from Saint Stanislaus College went swimming off Bay St. Louis, Mississippi. He was about 0.5 miles (0.80 km) offshore when a shark pulled him under the water. A week later, fishermen in the area caught a shark with his remains. |
| William McFlood | August 4, 1906 | Unconfirmed, possibly bull shark | McFlood fell overboard from a schooner in Tangier Sound, Maryland. His body was found a week later, nearly bitten in two. It is believed he was taken by a shark almost immediately after falling in. |
| Crew Member | Prior to October 10, 1906 | Unknown, possibly a tiger shark | At a seaport approximately 90 miles (140 km) from Honolulu, Hawaii, a small boat broke away from a coastal schooner - lying about 0.25 miles (0.40 km) from shore - and started sailing downwind. The boat's four-man crew then jumped into the water and swam after it, but by the time they reached the boat, one of them was missing. When they returned to the schooner, the remaining sailors reported that they "had seen bloody water...and an enormous shark swimming about." |
| Skipper | Prior to October 10, 1906 | Unknown, possibly a tiger shark | A skipper and his boat capsized in the waters between two Hawaiian Islands. While clinging to his upside-down boat in the water, his legs were bitten off by a shark. While he was able to pull himself onto the boat, he died of blood loss. |
| Belton Larkin | March 26, 1907 | Bull shark | Killed after a shark, which had been chasing a tarpon, leapt into his small skiff breaking it apart near Punta Gorda, Charlotte County, Florida. The shark bit his side nearly cutting him in two. |
| Japanese fisherman | 1907 | Unconfirmed, probably a tiger shark | Fell into the water and killed by a shark while net fishing near Pepeekeo, Honomu, Hawaii. |
| Japanese fisherman | January 8, 1908 | Unconfirmed | Killed by a shark while gathering fish stunned by dynamite in Mana, Kauaʻi, Hawaii. |
| John C. Williams | May 10, 1908 | Unconfirmed | John C. Williams' "mutilated" body was recovered off Marathon, Florida, in the Florida Keys. It was clear sharks had bitten his body, but shark involvement prior to death is not confirmed. |
| Walter Howe | June 8, 1908 | Unconfirmed | The steamer Caribee capsized in the waters off Georgia. While swimming back to a lifeboat after recovering oars, Howe's crewmates saw him suddenly disappear under the water. Numerous sharks had been seen in the water that day. |
| Ah Kim Chong, 19 | April 10, 1909 | Unconfirmed | The woman was reportedly swept away by large waves while gathering opihi along the rocky shoreline at Pauwela, Maui, Hawaii. A search party later witnessed a large shark devour what appeared to be part of the victim's body. |
| William Craug | August 13, 1909 | Unconfirmed | Craug was killed after falling overboard from the fishing schooner Halcyon off Pensacola, Florida. |

== 1910s ==
| Name, Age | Date | Species | Location; Comments |
|---|---|---|---|
| Unidentified male | 1910 | Unconfirmed | This victim was attacked while fishing at Hilo, Hawaii. |
| John Bloomquist | September 23, 1911 | Unconfirmed, probably a bull shark | Bloomquist was killed by a shark in the ship channel at Galveston Island, Texas after he jumped overboard to rescue a companion. |
| George Spencer | October 26, 1911 | Unconfirmed | Spencer was seen struggling with shark before being pulled underwater after falling overboard from the steamer Rio Grande off Charleston, South Carolina. |
| Jules Antoine | November 8, 1911 | Unconfirmed | This victim fell overboard and was killed by a shark while swimming in Pensacola Bay, Escambia County, Florida. |
| Edward Coffee, 12 | August 30, 1912 | Unconfirmed | Coffee, an excellent swimmer, was swimming with some boys at Tybee Island, Georgia, when he suddenly disappeared while swimming to deeper water. His death was blamed on a shark. |
| Soldier | July 12, 1913 | Unconfirmed | This man was killed off Charleston, South Carolina. |
| Okomoto | March 3, 1914 | Unconfirmed | Washed into the sea while picking opihi at Honomu, Hawaii, Okomoto was killed by two large sharks. |
| Peter Kontspaulas, 17 | September 9, 1914 | Unknown | Kontspaulas was swimming approximately 190 yards (170 m) offshore in Lake Pontchartrain, Louisiana, when he was attacked by a shark. He managed to fight the shark off in a long battle of approximately 20 minutes. He was rescued and put into a boat, but he died before reaching shore. |
| Charles Vansant, 23 | July 1, 1916 | Unconfirmed, experts are divided whether it was a bull or juvenile great white shark | Vansant, on vacation with his family at Beach Haven, New Jersey, was attacked while swimming in chest-deep water about 40 yards (40 m) from shore. Bathers believed he was calling to a dog, but a shark was actually biting Vansant's legs. He was rescued by lifeguard Alexander Ott and bystander Sheridan Taylor, who claimed the shark followed him to shore as they pulled the bleeding Vansant from the water. Vansant's left thigh was stripped of its flesh; he bled to death on the manager's desk of the Engleside Hotel at 6:45 PM. |
| Charles Bruder, 27 | July 6, 1916 | Unconfirmed, experts are divided whether it was a bull or juvenile great white shark | Bruder, a bell captain at the Essex & Sussex Hotel, was killed while swimming approximately 130 yards (120 m) from shore in Spring Lake, New Jersey. A shark bit his abdomen and severed his legs; Bruder's blood turned the water red. After hearing screams, a woman notified two lifeguards that a canoe with a red hull had capsized and was floating at the water's surface. Lifeguards Chris Anderson and George White rowed to Bruder in a lifeboat and heard him yell, "A shark bit me, bit my legs off!" They pulled him from the water, but he bled to death on the way to shore. |
| Lester Stillwell, 11 | July 12, 1916 | Unconfirmed, experts are divided whether it was a bull or juvenile great white shark | Around 2:00 PM, a group of boys, including Stillwell, were swimming together in Matawan Creek, a narrow, brackish, tidal river near Matawan, New Jersey. At an area called "Wyckoff dock" they saw what appeared to be an "old, black weather-beaten board or a weathered log." A dorsal fin appeared in the water and the boys realized it was a shark. Before Stillwell could climb from the creek, the shark pulled him underwater. He was bitten in the abdomen and lower body, resulting in fatal injuries. Stillwell's mutilated body was recovered 150 feet (46 m) upstream from the attack site on July 14. |
| Watson "Stanley" Fisher, 24 | July 12, 1916 | Unconfirmed, experts are divided whether it was a bull or juvenile great white shark | Fisher, hearing the news of Lester Stillwell's disappearance, headed to Matawan Creek (in New Jersey) as part of a rescue effort. Fisher and others dove continuously into the creek to find Stillwell, thinking he had suffered a seizure. After locating the boy's body and attempting to return to shore, Fisher was also bitten by a shark in front of the townspeople, losing Stillwell in the process. His right thigh was severely injured, and he bled to death at Monmouth Memorial Hospital in Long Branch at 5:30 PM. NOTE: Nearly 30 minutes after the fatal attacks on Stillwell and Fisher, 14-year-old Joseph Dunn, was attacked a half-mile (~805 m) from "Wyckoff dock". The shark bit his left leg, stripping it of flesh, but Dunn was rescued by his brother and friend after a vicious tug-of-war battle with the shark. Dunn survived the attack and was released from the hospital fifty-nine days later, on September 15. |
| J.L. Hanscom | October 11, 1916 | Unknown | Hanscom caught a "large shark" in a net off the coast of Sewall's Point, Florida, in the morning. He attempted to take in the shark alive when it severely bit his left leg. He died following a surgical amputation of the leg. |
| William Sinker | July 18, 1917 | Unknown | Sinker was killed while diving "before hundreds of spectators" at Key West, Florida. |
| Tadaicai Mayamura | November 1918 | Unconfirmed | Mayamura, a Japanese worker fishing off the coast of Papaikou plantation in Hawaii, was swept off a rock by a large wave. Mayamura was later heard crying for help and seen struggling in the water in the presence of a shark dorsal fin. His body was not recovered. |
| Unidentified male | April 6, 1919 | Unconfirmed | This fisherman was knocked into the water and killed in the Florida Keys. |

== 1920s ==
| Name, Age | Date | Species | Location; Comments |
|---|---|---|---|
| Dorothy MacLatchie, 18 | June 17, 1922 | Unconfirmed | Killed by a "monster fish", MacLatchie was floating next to the Municipal Pier in St. Petersburg, Florida. |
| Katherine W. Bourne | December 14, 1922 | Unconfirmed | Bourne died after her leg was bitten by a shark in San Juan, Puerto Rico. |
| Professor Winslow | November 21, 1924 | Unconfirmed | Winslow died after both legs and arms were severely bitten by a shark in Santurce, Puerto Rico. |
| William J. Goins | May 18, 1926 | Great white shark | Goins was attacked while swimming off Haleiwa, Oahu, Hawaii. Witnesses describe Goins as giving a loud shriek before suddenly disappearing beneath the surface. His remains were recovered from a 12.5-foot (3.8 m) great white shark captured off Kahuku. |
| Charles Burke, 18 | August 24, 1926 | Unconfirmed | This victim was allegedly killed by a shark in Seaside Heights, New Jersey. An unidentified rescuer who went to Burke's assistance reported that the boy was snatched from his grasp by a large fish, presumably a shark. However, other reports contradict this, stating that Burke died from drowning. |
| Two Young Boys | Prior to January 22, 1928 | Unconfirmed | Two stowaways jumped off the Norwegian steamer Vela in the Gulf of Mexico off the coast of Florida to attempt to swim to shore. They were thought to have been killed by sharks, although this has not been confirmed. |
| Earl Devore, 38 | November 12, 1928 | Unconfirmed, possibly great white shark | Devore was killed when his arm was severed after the lifeboat he was in capsized during the sinking of the SS Vestris, roughly 200 miles (320 km) off the coast of Virginia. |

== 1930s ==
| Name, Age | Date | Species | Location; Comments |
|---|---|---|---|
| George Gaspar | September 2, 1931 | Tiger shark | Gaspar was swept out to sea by strong currents while fishing at Kāhala, Oahu, Hawaii; his remains were recovered from the stomach of an 18-foot (5.5 m) shark near the Naval Air Station Barbers Point. |
| Thomas N. Martin, 24 | April 10, 1933 | Unconfirmed, probably a bull or tiger shark | Martin was killed in the surf at Miami Beach, Florida. |
| Richard Clark Best Jr., 8 | June 20, 1934 | Unconfirmed, probably a bull or tiger shark | Best was killed while standing in the surf at Melbourne, Florida. |
| Jere W. Fountain, 38 | September 21, 1935 | Bull shark | Fountain was killed while swimming in Browns Inlet on the New River near Onslow Beach, North Carolina. |
| Middle-aged Man | June 6, 1936 | Unconfirmed | This man was killed while swimming roughly 300 yards (270 m) from shore in Pinellas County, Florida. |
| Joseph Troy Jr., 16 | July 25, 1936 | Great white shark | Attacked while swimming at Hollywoods Beach in Mattapoisett, Massachusetts. Troy, a summer visitor from Dorchester, was grabbed and bitten by a 6-foot (1.8 m) shark and dragged underwater less than 50 feet (15 m) from shore. The badly injured youth was rushed to St. Luke's Hospital in New Bedford. He died on the operating table that night while surgeons were amputating his left leg. According to witness Martin Smith, Troy, along with a family friend, had been swimming out from the beach to meet the Black Cat, a catboat that had just picked up its mooring after a morning sail, when the shark attacked. The Black Cat's owner, Hubert Fisher, jumped into his dinghy and, with the help of the other swimmer, Walter Stiles of Boston, got the boy aboard and took him to the beach. Using an old wooden door as a stretcher, neighbors carried the badly injured teen to a car, and he was rushed to the hospital. In the aftermath of the fatal attack, beaches around Buzzards Bay, Massachusetts were deserted and swimming came to a halt along much of the Massachusetts coast, The Standard-Times reported. |
| Hal A. Thompson Jr., 14 | June 15, 1937 | Unconfirmed | Killed by a shark while swimming in the ocean in about 4 feet (1.2 m) of water near Galveston, Texas. Thompson's right arm was torn off and his right leg and thigh were mangled. |
| Three Crewmen | November 13, 1937 | Unconfirmed | Three men were reportedly killed by sharks after the Greek freighter Tzenny Chandris capsized off Cape Hatteras, North Carolina. |
| John Heagan | May 3, 1939 | Unconfirmed | Heagan was swept off the British freighter Huncliffe several hundred miles southeast of Cape Henry, Virginia, by a freak wave. While swimming back to the ship, he was suddenly pulled underwater. It is believed he was killed by a shark. |

== 1940s ==
| Name, Age | Date | Species | Location; Comments |
|---|---|---|---|
| Petty Officer Isadore Stessel | July 18, 1943 | Unconfirmed | The airship K-74 was shot down by a U-boat roughly 40 miles (64 km) east of Islamorada, Florida. The crew were discovered the following day, but just before being rescued, Stessel, the bombardier, was killed by a shark. |
| Kuenzler | May 8, 1945 | Unconfirmed | Kuenzler, a Navy seaman, was killed while swimming in Ocracoke Inlet, North Carolina. |
| Ralph Reginald Rives Jr., 20 | August 4, 1947 | Unconfirmed, probably a bull shark | Attacked while swimming in a canal 10 miles (20 km) north of St. Augustine, Florida, Rives' leg was severely bitten. The Jacksonville papers initially and erroneously reported this as a barracuda attack. He died in the hospital after attempts to save him were unsuccessful. |
| Neil Womack | February 13, 1948 | Unknown | Womack's plane crashed in the ocean near Brownsville, Texas. He died three days later after being attacked by sharks when he fell out of his life raft. |
| Clide Osborne, 46 | July 1, 1948 | Unknown | Osborne was in a boat 50 yards (46 m) offshore in Saint John, U.S. Virgin Islands when he either fell or jumped off the boat while intoxicated. He refused to climb back onto the boat, but then started to yell he was being attacked by a shark, and was pulled underwater. His body was never recovered. |

== 1950s ==
| Name, Age | Date | Species | Location; Comments |
|---|---|---|---|
| Gilbert S. Hotta | January 16, 1950 | Tiger shark | While fishing, Hotta was swept into the sea by a large wave near Kahakuloa, Maui, Hawaii. Three large tiger sharks were seen in the area on the day of the accident. His torso was recovered from a "huge tiger shark" caught there three days later. |
| Pedro Guzman, 25 | June 6, 1950 | Unknown | The plane Guzman was on crashed roughly 275 miles (443 km) northeast of Miami, Florida. When trying to swim to the rescue boat, Guzman was attacked and bitten by a shark five times. He died about 10 minutes after being pulled onto the rescue boat. |
| Alejandro Nodura | June 25, 1951 | Tiger shark | Swept out to sea while fishing at Kapehu Beach, Hawaii, the victim was last seen in the shark's mouth. |
| Pan American Airways pilot | 1952 | Unconfirmed | Killed while swimming near Key West, Florida, the man was bitten in the groin area. |
| Survivors of the wreck of the "Spare Time" | July 27, 1952 | Unknown, possibly great white, blue, or Oceanic whitetip shark. | This incident took place 14 miles (23 km) from shore off the coast of Santa Monica, California, in very rough seas. After the engine of the boat failed, several men tried to repair it. However, the boat exploded, and it sank. The next day, 3 men out of the 12 were rescued from shark-infested waters. The others are presumed to have drowned, died in the explosion, or been killed by sharks. |
| Shigeichi Kawamura | August 3, 1952 | Tiger shark | Kawamura disappeared while swimming between the Ala Moana channel and Kewalo Basin, Oahu, Hawaii. A shark bite was found on the right side of his body. |
| Gerbacio Solano, 40 | December 3, 1952 | Tiger shark | Solano was killed by an extremely large shark described by witnesses as being in excess of 22 feet (6.7 m) while swimming from his fishing boat, setting nets, at Maile Beach, Oahu, Hawaii. |
| Arthur Barry Lyle Wilson, 17 | December 7, 1952 | Great white shark | Wilson was attacked at approximately 2:00 p.m. while swimming near Lover's Point, Pacific Grove, California, with a friend, Brookner W. Grady Jr., 15. Wilson was some 25 yards (23 m) from shore in 30 feet (9 m) of water. Wave faces averaged 8 feet (2.4 m), with 6–8 feet (1.8–2.4 m) of visibility in the 55 °F (13 °C) water. Suddenly, a 12–15-foot (3.7–4.6 m) shark attacked Wilson, thrashing him and lifting him several feet into the air. Grady swam to his friend's aid and began gouging the shark's eye with a hunting knife. Four other swimmers helped pull the unconscious Wilson onto an inner tube, reaching shore some 20–30 minutes later with the shark circling the entire way. By then, Wilson had bled to death. His right leg was nearly bitten off in the attack; he also suffered a severed femoral artery, gashes to his left thigh, torso, and back, and a large chunk was torn out of his right buttock. The wounds suggest Wilson was bitten at least four times. The attack, which was witnessed by scores of beachgoers, was at the time considered to be the first "authenticated" attack on the California coast. |
| Gordon S. Chun | April 8, 1953 | Unconfirmed, probably a tiger shark | Swept into the sea while fishing from shore, Chun's recovered body was mutilated by sharks. He may have drowned near Wailupe, Oahu, Hawaii. |
| Harold Souza, 15 | July 26, 1953 | Tiger shark | Souza was killed while spearfishing off Maile Beach, Oahu, Hawaii. A 10-foot (3.0 m) shark was observed in the vicinity. |
| Capt. Kosuo Mizokawa, 27 | January 6, 1955 | Unconfirmed, probably a tiger shark | Mizokawa was attacked after diving overboard and swimming near the stern of the Japanese-flagged trawler Taiyo Maru near the Van Camp Seafood Company tuna cannery in Pago Pago Harbor, Tutuila, American Samoa. |
| Jose Alengo, 13 | July 28, 1956 | Unknown | Alengo was 30 to 40 feet (9.1 to 12.2 m) from shore at 10:30 in the morning floating in an inner tube off Aguadilla, Puerto Rico, when his brother speared a shark, which then proceeded to attack Alengo. Alengo died after his left leg was severed at the knee. |
| Jose Luis Nufize Lago, 13 | Prior to August 15, 1956 | Unknown | Lago was skin diving off the northern coast of Puerto Rico when a "school of sharks" attacked him, severing one of his legs. |
| Peter Savino, 25 | April 28, 1957 | Great white shark | Savino was killed at approximately 1:30 p.m. while swimming with a friend, Daniel Hogan, 22, off Atascadero Beach, Morro Bay, California. After being swept out some 300–600 yards (270–550 m) from shore by a strong tide, the two started a swim back, though Savino began to tire. As Hogan towed Savino, a shark appeared and nudged Savino with enough force to draw blood. Aware of the imminent danger, the men started a furious race to shore, but when Hogan looked back to check on his friend, Savino had disappeared. The U.S. Coast Guard sent a launch to the area, and Executive Officer James C. Knight reported seeing a 20–21-foot (6.1–6.4 m) shark swim by, though by the time the crew had returned to the spot with armaments, the shark had disappeared. Despite the following day's search, Savino's body was never recovered. This attack bears similarities to the attack on Robert Pamperin in June 1959 by a similarly large white shark. |
| Rupert Wade, 57 | July 15, 1957 | Great white shark | Wade was killed while swimming in the surf at Atlantic Beach, Salter Path, Carteret County, North Carolina. |
| Angel Escartin, 35 | July 10, 1958 | Unconfirmed | Autopsy report concluded Escartin was bitten by a shark off Key West, Monroe County, Florida, while still alive. |
| William S. Weaver, 15 | December 13, 1958 | Tiger shark | While surfing near the Mokulua Islands off Lanikai, Oʻahu, Hawaii, Weaver was killed when his leg was severed. Rescue personnel recovering his body two hours later observed a 15–18-foot (4.6–5.5 m) shark in the vicinity. |
| Albert Kogler Jr., 18 | May 7, 1959 | Great white shark | Kogler was killed while swimming in less than 15 feet (4.6 m) of water off Baker Beach, San Francisco, California. |
| Robert Lyell Pamperin, 33 | June 14, 1959 | Great white shark | Pamperin was free-diving with a friend, Gerald Lehrer, 30, for abalone 55 yards offshore at Alligator Head, La Jolla Cove, La Jolla, California. Around 5:10 p.m., Lehrer heard Pamperin screaming for help, his thrashing body momentarily upright and waist-high out of the water before submerging. Lehrer dove and spotted a 22 ft (7 m) shark thrashing Pamperin in its mouth, seemingly trying to swallow him feet-first. Lehrer dove several times in a futile effort to scare off the shark before swimming to land. The attack was witnessed by several people onshore. An extensive search by police divers and the Coast Guard failed to recover Pamperin's body; only a single swim fin was ever found. |
| Lt. James C. Neal, 26 | August 15, 1959 | Unconfirmed | Neal was free-diving with four friends in the Gulf of Mexico about 6 miles (9.7 km) off Panama City, Florida. Neal's friends surfaced and threw him a line after entering their cruise boat; Neal, however, failed to climb up. One of the men, Gary Seymour, 21, went back into the water to search for Neal, but was "attacked by two big sharks", managing to escape by hiding in a crevice in the coral reef. Navy divers from the U.S. Naval Mine Defense Laboratory found Neal's swim fins, face mask, and lead diving weights, all showing bite marks. Neal's swim trunks and parts of his undershirt were also found, bloodstained and ripped. His body was never recovered. Charter boat captain Charles House reported his crew baited and hooked two 12-foot (3.7 m) sharks some 300 feet (91 m) from Neal's last known location about an hour before he vanished. |

== 1960s ==
| Name, age | Date | Species | Location, comments |
|---|---|---|---|
| Young Marine recruit | August 1960 | Unconfirmed | This victim was killed while swimming from camp off Parris Island, South Carolina. |
| Sarah Sargent, 51 | November 22, 1960 | Unconfirmed | Sargent died after falling overboard in turbulent waters off St. Lucie Inlet, Florida. Her body "mangled" by sharks washed up later. She probably drowned before being scavenged. |
| Harold Riley | December 27, 1960 | Tiger shark | Swept out to sea while net fishing at Maile Point, Oahu, Hawaii, Riley was seen being attacked by a 20-foot (6.1 m) shark. His body was recovered off the coast of Nanakuli. |
| William J. Dandridge, 23 | June 24, 1961 | Unconfirmed, probably a bull or tiger shark | Killed while scuba diving and spearfishing 9 miles (14 km) east of Key Biscayne, Dade County, Florida, the left side of Dandridge's torso, including the left arm, was devoured. |
| Jacob Horn, 45 | October 1961 | Unconfirmed, probably a bull or tiger shark | Presumed killed by a shark; Horn's mutilated body washed ashore near Boca Raton, Palm Beach County, Florida. |
| Hans Fix, 40 | August 19, 1962 | Bull shark | Fix was killed while surf fishing in waist-deep water at Andy Bowie Park, Padre Island, near Port Isabel, Texas. |
| Roy C. Kametani | April 8, 1963 | Tiger shark | Kametami was swept out to sea while picking opihi at Hapuna Beach, Hawaii. Parts of the body were later recovered. The victim may have drowned before being consumed. |
| LTJG John W. Gibson, 25 | April 20, 1963 | Galapagos shark | Gibson was attacked at about 1:30 p.m. roughly 33 yards (30 m) from shore while attempting to swim across Magens Bay, Saint Thomas, U.S. Virgin Islands. Water conditions were calm with a temperature of approximately 82.4 °F (28 °C) and a depth of 40 feet (12 m). A vacationing tourist acquainted with Gibson, Donna M. Waugh, 25, aided him in swimming to shore, but he succumbed to his injuries and was pronounced dead at 2 p.m. Gibson's wounds included a dismembered right hand, a mangled left shoulder, and a badly bitten right thigh and hip (including a severed femoral artery). The next day, a 10-foot (3 m) male Galapagos shark was baited and hooked in the bay, its stomach containing Gibson's missing hand and other human remains; the shark's jaws are now on display at the University of Puerto Rico at Mayagüez's marine laboratory. |
| Unidentified male | September 20, 1967 | Tiger shark | This victim lost at sea when his boat capsized in the waters between the Hawaiian islands of Oahu and Molokai. Part of the victim's remains were recovered from the stomach of a captured 11-foot (3.4 m) tiger shark. |

== 1970s ==
| Name, Age | Date | Location | Species | Comments |
|---|---|---|---|---|
| Ernie Reathaford | March 31, 1970 | Oahu, Hawaii | Unconfirmed, probably a tiger shark | Swept out to sea by strong surf, Reathaford was bodyboarding at Waimea Bay, Oahu, Hawaii. A 15–18-foot (4.6–5.5 m) shark was observed in the area. |
| Rodney Temple, 23 | October 14, 1972 | Saint Croix, U.S. Virgin Islands | Oceanic whitetip shark | Temple was scuba diving with partners Bret Gilliam and Robbie McIlvaine in calm 80 °F (27 °C) water with 150 feet (46 m) of visibility some 300 yards (270 m) from shore. The experienced divers were retrieving research samples from Cane Bay, Saint Croix, U.S. Virgin Islands. At a depth of 210 feet (64 m), they noted two oceanic whitetips circling them. Gilliam and McIlvaine began ascending to the surface first, momentarily decompressing on a reef ledge at 175 feet (53 m) before noticing bubbles rising from Temple's position below. Gilliam descended and saw a 12-foot (3.7 m) whitetip biting Temple's left thigh, and the second larger shark attacking immediately afterward and severing Temple's lower left leg. Gilliam grabbed Temple's shoulder harness and began kicking to the surface, but the sharks pulled the two men deeper to 400 feet (120 m), tearing into Temple's abdomen and pulling him out of Gilliam's arms. Gilliam and McIlvaine successfully surfaced and survived; Temple's body was never recovered. This may be the deepest shark attack on record. |
| Billy Horne, 10 | July 2, 1974 | Gulf of Mexico | Oceanic whitetip shark | While adrift after the yacht he was in caught on fire and sank, Horne was killed by a shark in the Gulf of Mexico off the coast of Florida. |
| John Carter, 17 | July 20, 1974 | Chatham County, Georgia | Unconfirmed | Carter was killed by a school of small sharks while swimming in the Back River on the southern end of Savannah Beach, Chatham County, Georgia. |
| Grace Conger, 62 | July 30, 1975 | Oregon | Unconfirmed | Conger died from blood loss after being attacked by sharks when her fishing boat sank off the coast of Oregon. |
| Stephen C. Powell | July 16, 1976 | Kauaʻi, Hawaii | Unconfirmed, probably a tiger shark | Killed by a shark while scuba diving off Koloa, Kauaʻi, Hawaii, only the lower portion of Powell's body was recovered. |
| Danson Nakaima | 1976 | Lahaina, Maui, Hawaii | Bull shark | Nakaima was presumed to have been killed while scuba diving for black coral at a depth of 180 feet (55 m) off Lahaina, Maui, Hawaii. Approximately 30 large sharks were later seen near his partially devoured remains. |
| Unidentified male | 1979 | South Kohala, Big Island, Hawaii | Unconfirmed, probably a tiger shark | This victim disappeared while fishing from shore at South Kohala, Big Island, Hawaii. Police divers only recovered the elderly man's severed hand and a flashlight. |

== 1980s ==
| Name, Age | Date | Location | Species | Comments |
|---|---|---|---|---|
| Roger B. Garletts | May 21, 1981 | Kauaʻi, Hawaii. | Unconfirmed, probably a tiger shark | Garletts disappeared while scuba diving and spearfishing at a depth of 60–80 feet (18–24 m) in murky, choppy water at Haena Beach Park, Kauaʻi, Hawaii. His recovered dive gear and shredded wetsuit, which bore numerous teeth marks, were suggestive of a fatal shark attack. |
| Christy Wapniarski, 19 | August 10, 1981 | Volusia County, Florida | Unconfirmed, probably a bull or tiger shark | A catamaran Wapniarski was riding on had capsized the night before off of Daytona Beach, Volusia County, Florida. She was presumably killed by a shark while attempting to swim to shore at daybreak. |
| Mark Meeker, 26 | September 15, 1981 | Manatee County, Florida | Unconfirmed, probably a bull shark | Meeker was killed while swimming between Anna Maria Island and Egmont Key State Park in Tampa Bay, Manatee County, Florida. He was found dead the next day. He had taken off his bathing suit to use the drawstring as a makeshift tourniquet on his right calf. |
| Lewis Archer Boren, 24 | December 19, 1981 | Monterey, California | Great white shark | Boren was attacked on December 19 while surfing alone at South Moss Beach, Spanish Bay, Monterey, California. He was last seen by friends at approximately 2 pm, after they surfed together that morning. The next day, two surfers stumbled upon Boren's kneeboard, which had washed ashore at Asilomar State Beach with an 18-inch (46 cm), crescent-shaped bite taken out of one side; the board's missing piece was found nearby. Analysis of the bite mark showed the presence of embedded teeth fragments from a great white shark. At 11 a.m. on December 24, Boren's body was spotted by a park ranger near Pacific Grove, about 0.62 miles (1 km) north of the attack site. Boren, who had been wearing a dark wetsuit, was believed to have been lying on his yellow kneeboard in 10 feet (3 m) of water just beyond the breakpoint, when a great white shark struck from the left side, biting through both Boren and his board. Water conditions were rough, with average temperatures for that time of year with grey skies and deteriorating visibility. Boren was bitten once, his massive wound extending from beneath his left armpit to just above the hip, and stretching more than halfway across his body, likely killing him instantly. This attack was notable for the size of the shark involved; experts concluded this shark to be around 23 ft (7.1 m) long. The specimen was never found or identified, and is considered the largest white shark ever recorded with verifiable evidence. |
| John Lippoth, 27; Mark Adams, 24 | October 27, 1982 | Ocean City, Maryland | Unconfirmed | The two victims were crewing a 58' yacht in the ocean somewhere off of Ocean City, Maryland. Also on board were additional crew members: Meg Cooney, Brad Cavanagh, and Deborah Scaling Kiley. Soon after departing Maryland, the yacht was caught in a major tropical storm. The severity of the storm forced the crew to abandon ship in heavy seas. The crew managed to board a rubber dinghy with no motor, survival equipment, food or water on board. During the abandonment of the ship Meg Cooney sustained serious injuries. After some time with no food or water both of Lippoth and Adams opted to drink salty sea-water in an attempt to slake their thirst. Shortly afterwards both of them began to hallucinate and then jumped overboard. The two were soon thereafter killed and devoured by a group of sharks which had been circling their dinghy for several days. While awaiting rescue Meg Cooney succumbed to her injuries and also died. The remaining two crew members were eventually rescued by a Soviet ice-harvesting ship. |
| Omar Conger, 28 | September 15, 1984 | Santa Cruz, California | Great white shark | Conger was attacked at 8:30 a.m. while free-diving for abalone with a friend, Chris Rehm, 33, in 15 feet (4.6 m) of water about 164 yards (150 m) from shore near Pigeon Point, between Half Moon Bay and Santa Cruz, California. The men had been in the water for about 20–30 minutes before the attack occurred. Water conditions were calm, but visibility was less than 3.3 feet (1 m). Conger was struck twice, with the shark initially thrashing and pulling him underwater before resurfacing and swimming away. Rehm pulled Conger onto an inflatable surf mat, but Conger bled to death before they could reach shore. Injuries to Conger's thighs were extensive (both femoral arteries were severed), and his hands and buttocks were severely bitten; the wounds suggested that the Great White was at least 16 feet (4.9 m) long. Conger's black wetsuit may have increased the likelihood the shark mistook him for a seal. |
| Thomas Robert Sewell, 67 | August 1985 | Gulf of Mexico | Unconfirmed | This victim was presumed to have been killed by a shark in the Gulf of Mexico, 19 miles (31 km) west of Bayport, Hernando County, Florida. His body was never recovered. Some of his equipment – a diving regulator, swim fin, and bathing suit – were found, showing teeth marks. |
| Levi Chandler | April 20, 1986 | Kauaʻi, Hawaii | Unconfirmed | Chandler was fishing from the rocky shore at Kalihiwai Point, Kauaʻi, Hawaii, before falling into the water and disappearing. Police divers searching the area encountered a large shark swimming in the vicinity and retrieved floating pieces of clothing and human flesh. The victim may have drowned before being consumed. |
| Daniel Kennedy | April 15, 1987 | Kailua-Kona, Hawaii | Unconfirmed | Kennedy was presumed to have been killed by a shark while swimming out to an anchored sailboat near Kailua-Kona, Hawaii. While his body was never recovered, his swim trunks were found bitten in half on the seafloor. |
| Avery Goo | April 15, 1988 | Maui, Hawaii | Unconfirmed | This victim's 21-foot (6.4 m) powerboat capsized in turbulent water off the coast of Waihee, Maui, Hawaii. Pieces of human flesh consisting of stomach, intestines, and pancreas washed up along the Waihee shoreline several days later. |
| John P. Martin, 38 | September 13, 1988 | Panama City, Florida | Bull shark | Martin was killed while snorkeling around Shell Island near Panama City, Florida. A 10-foot (3 m)-long bull shark had caused fatal thigh and hand wounds. |
| Tamara McAllister, 24; Roy Jeffrey Stoddard, 24 | January 26, 1989 | Malibu, California | Great white shark | McAllister was killed while kayaking off the coast of Malibu, California, with her boyfriend, Roy Jeffrey Stoddard. McAllister's body was found floating face down two days later, with large sections from her legs and buttocks missing; no trace of Stoddard was ever found. |
| Ray Mehl Jr. | October 14, 1989 | Oahu, Hawaii | Tiger shark | This victim was scuba diving with a partner at a depth of 27 feet (8.2 m), about 750 feet (230 m) from shore near the HECO power plant at Kahe Point, Oahu, Hawaii. He had been in the water for 10–15 minutes before vanishing around 4:30 p.m. His partner conducted a search of the area where water visibility was around 30 feet (9.1 m), but could not locate Mehl. The following morning, a decapitated body was spotted by rescue divers 200 feet (61 m) west of Mehl's last known location, but before it could be retrieved, a large tiger shark suddenly appeared and proceeded to devour what remained of the body. Mehl's partner noted the parrotfish had been exhibiting "unusual behavior" just prior to his disappearance. |

== 1990s ==
| Name, Age | Date | Location | Species | Comments |
|---|---|---|---|---|
| Roy T. Tanaka | February 17, 1990 | Honolulu, Hawaii | Tiger shark | Tanaka was scuba diving and spearing parrotfish with his partner, Jake Hernandez, at a depth of 40 feet (12 m), about 600 feet (180 m) from the shore. The victim vanished around 9:30 p.m. at Mokapu, near the Marine Corps Air Station, Honolulu, Hawaii. Diving equipment was later found. The next day around 3 p.m., a floating body (which was missing its left arm) was sighted from a helicopter in the waters between Mānana Island and Makai pier. Several large sharks, apparently reacting to the helicopter's presence, proceeded to devour all but the body's torso and legs before it could be retrieved. |
| Suk Kyu (Steve) Park | November 19, 1991 | Maui, Hawaii | Tiger shark | Park was swept out to sea by a large wave while fishing from the rocky coastline at Maliko Point, Maui, Hawaii, at around 4:30 p.m. Described as very healthy and a strong swimmer, Park was treading water before signaling his son to call for help. Rescuers arrived about 30 minutes later, by which time the victim had disappeared. His body was never recovered, although his shorts and shirt were discovered the following morning by rescue divers with large portions missing from the left side, consistent with an attack by a 12-foot (3.7 m) tiger shark. |
| Martha Joy Morrell, 41 | November 26, 1991 | Maui, Hawaii | Tiger shark | Fatally attacked around 9 a.m., Morrell was attacked while snorkeling 100 yards (91 m) from shore on west side of Maui, Hawaii, at Olowalu, less than 1 mi (1.6 km) from Camp Pecusa. The attack by the 8–11-foot (2.4–3.4 m) tiger shark occurred in 10–15 feet (3.0–4.6 m) of water and was witnessed by victim's snorkeling partner and groundskeeper. Morrell's body was recovered and later autopsied at Maui Memorial Hospital by the County Coroner. Injuries included amputation of left arm at the shoulder, right forearm, left leg above the hip joint, and right foot/lower leg. |
| Bryan Adona, 29 | February 19, 1992 | Oahu, Hawaii | Tiger shark | Adona was presumed to have been killed in the late afternoon by a tiger shark when he did not return from bodyboarding west of Waimea Bay, Oahu, Hawaii. There were no witnesses to the attack; however, his bodyboard was found the following morning with a 16-inch (41 cm) crescent-shaped piece missing that experts said was made by a large tiger shark. Numerous witnesses, including the last person to see Adona alive, reported seeing a large shark in the vicinity prior to the attack. |
| Aaron A. Romento, 18 | November 5, 1992 | Oahu, Hawaii | Tiger shark | Romento was attacked and killed while bodyboarding at 9:45 a.m. in shallow, clear water approximately 90 feet (27 m) from shore off Keʻeau Beach Park, Oahu, Hawaii. His right leg was severely bitten in three places by a 10–12-foot (3.0–3.7 m) tiger shark, and he died of blood loss a short time after swimming to shore. |
| Daniel McMoyler | December 1993 | Waipio, Hawaii | Tiger shark | On January 11, 1994, McMoyler's remains washed up on the beach at Waipio, Hawaii. He is thought to have been killed by an 8-foot (2 m) tiger shark while surfing sometime during the previous month. |
| Jim Broach | January 31, 1994 | Oahu, Hawaii | Tiger shark | Broach was killed while surfing at Velzyland on the North Shore of Oahu, Hawaii. |
| Michelle von Emster, 25 | April 16, 1994 | San Diego, California | Great white shark | von Emster was killed while swimming off Point Loma, San Diego, California. The San Diego County medical examiner's office ruled she was killed in a shark attack; however, some in the law enforcement community have questioned this conclusion and feel she may have been murdered and dumped in the Pacific Ocean. |
| James Robinson, 42 | December 9, 1994 | San Miguel Island, California | Great white shark | Robinson was killed while diving for sea urchins off Harris Point, San Miguel Island, California. The shark was estimated to be 17–19 feet (5.2–5.8 m) feet long. |
| William Covert, 25 | September 13, 1995 | Monroe County, Florida | Bull shark | A scuba diver, Covert was presumed to have been killed by a 10–12-foot (3.0–3.7 m) bull shark near Alligator Reef off Islamorada, Monroe County, Florida. His body was never recovered. |
| James Willie Tellasmon, 9 | November 21, 1998 | Indian River County, Florida | Tiger shark | Killed while swimming off Ocean Beach, Jaycee Park, Indian River County, Florida, US Coast Guard Station Fort Pierce recovered the body the following day. The nature of the wounds allowed experts to conclusively establish the shark was a tiger shark, about 6 feet (1.8 m) long. |
| Nahid Davoodabai, 29 | March 18, 1999 | Maui, Hawaii | Unconfirmed, presumed to be a tiger shark | This unconfirmed fatal attack occurred in channel waters off the west coast of Maui, Hawaii. The victim's husband, Manoucher Monazzami, stated to authorities that he and his wife were blown offshore while kayaking late in the afternoon. Their double kayak capsized repeatedly in rough channel waters, and Davoodabai was soon unable to get back onto the kayak due to fatigue. She was attacked at dusk by a "large shark", losing her arm. Monazzami was unable to control his injured wife's bleeding or keep her body on the kayak due to ocean conditions. Monazzami was found two days later on nearby Kahoolawe island with the kayak, paddles, and a life jacket. His wife's body was never recovered. Some investigators did not believe this version of events. |

== 2000s ==
| Name, Age | Date | Location | Species | Comments |
|---|---|---|---|---|
| Thadeus Kubinski, 69 | August 30, 2000 | Pinellas County, Florida | Bull shark | Kubinski was killed while swimming in Pinellas County, Florida. Witnesses said Kubinski had jumped into the water from the dock behind his home for his daily swim and was splashing vigorously. The shark raced toward him with its dorsal fin out of the water. He died from massive blood loss and organ damage before rescuers could get to him. The shark was estimated to be 9 feet (3 m) long and weigh 400 pounds (181 kg). |
| David Peltier, 10 | September 1, 2001 | Virginia Beach, Virginia | Bull shark | Peltier was killed while surfing with his father and brothers at Sandbridge Beach, south of Virginia Beach, Virginia. He died of severe injuries to the lower leg. |
| Sergei Zaloukaev, 28 | September 3, 2001 | Dare County, North Carolina | Tiger Shark | Zaloukaev was killed while swimming with his girlfriend in the surf off Avon, Hatteras Island, Dare County, North Carolina; his girlfriend, Natalia Slobodskaya, was severely injured in the attack, but survived. |
| Eric Reichardt, 42 | September 16, 2001 | Broward County, Florida | Unconfirmed, possibly a bull shark or tiger shark | This death was officially classified as a drowning by the Broward County, Florida, medical examiner's office; however, it is listed as a fatal shark attack by the International Shark Attack File. Reichardt drowned while diving on the wreck of the Ronald B. Johnson in 270 feet (82 m) of water 2 miles (3.2 km) off Pompano Beach, Florida, while fighting off a shark. His diving regulator may have fallen out of his mouth, causing him to drown. |
| Deborah Blanche Franzman, 50 | August 19, 2003 | Avila Beach, California | Great white shark | Franzman was attacked at approximately 8:15 a.m. while swimming in 15–20 feet (4.6–6.1 m) of water 75 yards (69 m) off Avila Pier, Avila Beach, California. She was bitten on the left hip and lower right leg by a shark estimated to be 16–18 feet (4.9–5.5 m) long. According to witnesses, Franzman was swimming with seals alongside a line of buoys in a full wetsuit before the animals "suddenly scattered". Franzman screamed for help after the shark struck twice and swam off, but apparently lost consciousness and drifted face-down in the water before lifeguards pulled her to shore, by which time she had died of blood loss. Her wounds included a severed femoral artery. Franzman was only the second shark-related fatality in San Luis Obispo County history since the April 1957 death of Peter Savino. |
| Courtney Marcher, 22 | April 4, 2004 | Oahu, Hawaii | Unconfirmed, possibly a tiger shark | Marcher disappeared while surfing at Velzyland, the North Shore of Oahu, Hawaii, around 8:45 a.m. Her undamaged surfboard was found 3 miles (4.8 km) off Kaena Point by a fisherman three days later, 18 miles (29 km) north of her last known location and consistent with currents. Unusual serrated markings on the board's ankle leash were suggestive of shark involvement, but analysis by the state Shark Task Force proved inconclusive, with experts divided as to what the marks represented. Police reported Marcher had a history of seizures and may have run into trouble in the water, although she had been taking medication to control epilepsy and had no recent history of illness. On the day she vanished, wave faces averaged 6 feet (1.8 m), but she was described as healthy and a strong swimmer. |
| Willis R. McInnis, 57 | April 7, 2004 | Maui, Hawaii | Tiger shark | Attacked while surfing off Pohaku Park, Maui, Hawaii, McInnis died a short time after the attack as a result of blood loss from severe wounds to his right thigh and calf. |
| Randy Fry, 50 | August 15, 2004 | Mendocino, California, | Great white shark | Fry was killed while diving for abalone with a friend in 15–20 feet (4.6–6.1 m) of water 150 feet (46 m) from shore off Mendocino, California, near Kibesillah Rock. His headless body was recovered the next day. His head washed ashore 2 miles (3.2 km) north on September 3. The bite radius was 18 inches (46 cm), allowing experts to extrapolate the shark was 16–18 feet (4.9–5.5 m) long. |
| Jamie Marie Daigle, 14 | June 25, 2005 | Walton County, Florida | Bull shark | Daigle was killed while swimming with a friend on boogie boards about 200 yards (180 m) off a beach in Walton County, Florida, 8 miles (13 km) east of Destin, Florida. Witnesses estimated the shark was 6–8 feet (1.8–2.4 m) long. Her left leg was severed and she died of massive blood loss. |
| Dr. David Roger Martin, 66 | April 25, 2008 | Solana Beach, California | Great white shark | Martin was killed at approximately 7:20 a.m. while swimming with a group of eight other triathletes off a beach in Solana Beach, California. The victim was bitten across both thighs. |
| Richard A. Snead, 60 | September 12, 2009 | Corolla, North Carolina | Unconfirmed | Snead died while swimming in the Atlantic Ocean at twilight off the beach in the Whale Head Bay area of Corolla, North Carolina, near mile post 4 1/2. His body was found washed up on the beach in Kill Devil Hills, North Carolina. Final autopsy results, released on January 5, 2010, concluded Snead's death appeared to be from drowning. This conclusion conflicted, however, with an initial autopsy conducted at East Carolina University which said he died of shark bites. |

== 2010s ==
| Name, Age | Date | Location | Species | Comments |
|---|---|---|---|---|
| Stephen Howard Schafer, 38 | February 3, 2010 | Stuart Beach, Florida | Bull shark | Schafer was attacked while kitesurfing around 4:15 p.m. about 500 yards (460 m) off an unguarded section of a beach south of Stuart Beach in Martin County, Florida. Authorities initially thought multiple sharks may have been involved in the incident due to reports by rescuers that he was surrounded by sharks. The Martin County medical examiner's office concluded he died from massive blood loss from a leg wound. |
| Lucas McKaine Ransom, 19 | October 22, 2010 | Surf Beach, California | Great white shark | Ransom died after a great white shark pulled him off his bodyboard just before 9 a.m. about 100 yards (91 m) off Surf Beach near Vandenberg Air Force Base in Santa Barbara County, California. He suffered the loss of his left leg, resulting in massive blood loss. On October 25, 2010, the Santa Barbara County coroner confirmed the species as great white after conferring with shark experts from the Los Angeles-based Shark Research Committee. The shark that attacked Ransom is believed to have been 17–18 feet (5.2–5.5 m) long, weighing approximately 4,000 pounds (1,814 kg). |
| Francisco Javier Solorio Jr., 39 | October 23, 2012 | Surf Beach, California | Great white shark | Solorio died after he was bitten on the left side of his upper torso by a great white shark while surfing. The attack occurred at Surf Beach near Vandenberg Air Force Base in Santa Barbara County, California, just two years (almost to the very day) after a fatal attack in the same location. Authorities from the Santa Barbara County Sheriff's Office positively identified the species involved in the attack as a 15–16 feet (4.6–4.9 m) great white shark. |
| Jana Lutteropp, 20 | August 14, 2013 | Maui, Hawaii | unconfirmed, presumed to be a Tiger shark | Lutteropp, a German tourist, died on August 21, 2013, one week after her right arm was bitten off by a shark while snorkeling 50 to 100 yards (46 to 91 m) off Palauea beach in Makena, Maui. |
| Patrick A. Briney, 57 | December 2, 2013 | Maui, Hawaii | unconfirmed, presumed to be a Tiger shark | Briney, a resident of Washington (state), was fishing from a kayak with his right foot dangling over the side, which was bitten by a shark. He died while being transported to shore. The attack occurred about 500 yards (460 m) off Keawakapu Beach in the Makena State Recreation Area on Maui, Hawaii. |
| Margaret C. Cruse, 65 | April 29, 2015 | Maui, Hawaii | unconfirmed, presumed to be a Tiger shark | Cruse, a resident of Kihei, Hawaii, was bitten in the upper torso while snorkeling by an unknown species of shark at a popular surfing spot known as "The Dumps" near Makena, Maui. Her lifeless body was found floating face-down by other snorkelers. She also lost an arm in the attack. |
| Arthur Medici, 26 | September 15, 2018 | Wellfleet, Massachusetts | Unconfirmed, presumed to be a great white shark | At around noon on Saturday September 15, Medici was attacked while boogie boarding with a friend near Newcomb Hollow Beach on Cape Cod and was transferred to Cape Cod Hospital. He died in the hospital a few hours later, in the first fatal shark attack in Massachusetts since 1936. This attack occurred only a few weeks after another man was non-fatally injured by what was determined to be a great white shark in the nearby town of Truro. |
| Thomas Smiley, 65 | May 25, 2019 | Maui, Hawaii | Unknown | Just before 9 a.m., 65-year-old Thomas Smiley from California was attacked by a shark while swimming about 60 yards (55 m) off Ka’anapali Beach. He was pronounced dead at the scene. |

== 2020s ==
| Name, Age | Date | Location | Species | Comments |
|---|---|---|---|---|
| Ben Kelly, 26 | May 9, 2020 | Manresa State Beach, California | Great white shark | Attacked within 100 yards (91 m) of the shore near Watsonville, California while the victim was surfing. |
| Julie Dimperio Holowach, 63 | July 27, 2020 | Bailey Island, Maine | Great white shark | Attacked about 20 yards (18 m) from the shore while swimming with her daughter. It was the first recorded fatal shark attack in Maine. |
| Robin Warren, 56 | December 8, 2020 | Maui, Hawaii | Tiger shark | Attack happened just before 8 a.m. in Honolua Bay, North Maui while the victim was on his surfboard. The shark's bite took a 17-inch-wide chunk out of the surfboard. The victim was hospitalized and in stable condition, but after undergoing surgery his condition deteriorated and he died the following day. |
| Tomas Butterfield, 42 | December 24, 2021 | Morro Bay, California | Great white shark | Around 10:40 a.m. surfer Rebecca Frimmer spotted a lone bodyboard being pushed by the waves to shore before snapping back as if something was attached to it. Fearing someone might be drowning she pulled on the surfboard leash and discovered Butterfield's shark bitten body. An autopsy revealed a 15-inch bite mark and concluded Butterfield died from blunt trauma within minutes of being attacked. |
| Kristine "Kristi" Allen, 60 | December 8, 2022 | Maui, Hawaii | Tiger shark | Allen was last seen around noon about 75 yards (69 m) off Keawakapu Point in South Maui two years to the day after another fatal attack on Maui. Searchers found an 'aggressive' 10-to-13-foot (3.0 to 4.0 m) tiger shark in the area. |
| Felix Louis N'Jai, 52 | October 1, 2023 | Wildcat Beach, California | Great white shark | At around 10:20 am, N'Jai was attacked and pulled under by a shark while swimming 100 yards (91 m) offshore with two friends. According to friend and witness Jim Kennan, a shark came up and grabbed N'Jai by the neck, brought him down and that was the last they saw. The two other men quickly swam ashore, turned around and saw blood and some commotion in the water. At the time of the incident, Marin County firefighters said they determined that the three men encountered a shark who attacked one of them. N'Jai's body was never recovered. |
| Jason Carter, 39 | December 30, 2023 | Pāʻia Bay, Maui, Hawaii | Unknown | First responders rushed to provide medical aid to the victim who was surfing, after 11:00 am, Carter was rushed to the hospital and treated but later died of his wounds that afternoon. |
| Tamayo Perry, 49 | June 23, 2024 | North Shore, Oahu, Hawaii | Unknown | Perry, a well-known surfer and lifeguard, was surfing near Goat Island in the early afternoon when he was fatally injured in a shark attack and was pronounced dead on the beach. |
| Arlene Lillis, 56 | January 8, 2026 | Dorsch Beach St. Croix, USVI | Unknown | Lillis was killed while snorkeling near Dorsch Beach in St. Croix, U.S. Virgin Islands. The shark severed her left arm from the elbow down. Christopher Carroll, a registered nurse from Utah, witnessed the attack and towed her in where she could receive medical attention, however she did not recover. |

== See also ==
- Shark attack
- Red Triangle (Pacific Ocean)
- Jersey Shore shark attacks of 1916
- List of fatal shark-incidents in Australia (Australia has the second largest number of reported shark attacks)
- List of fatal shark attacks in South African territorial waters

Species

- Animal attacks
- List of fatal bear attacks in North America
- List of fatal cougar attacks in North America
- List of fatal snake bites in the United States
- List of fatal alligator attacks in the United States
- List of wolf attacks in North America
- Fatal dog attacks in the United States
