= List of fatal cougar attacks in North America =

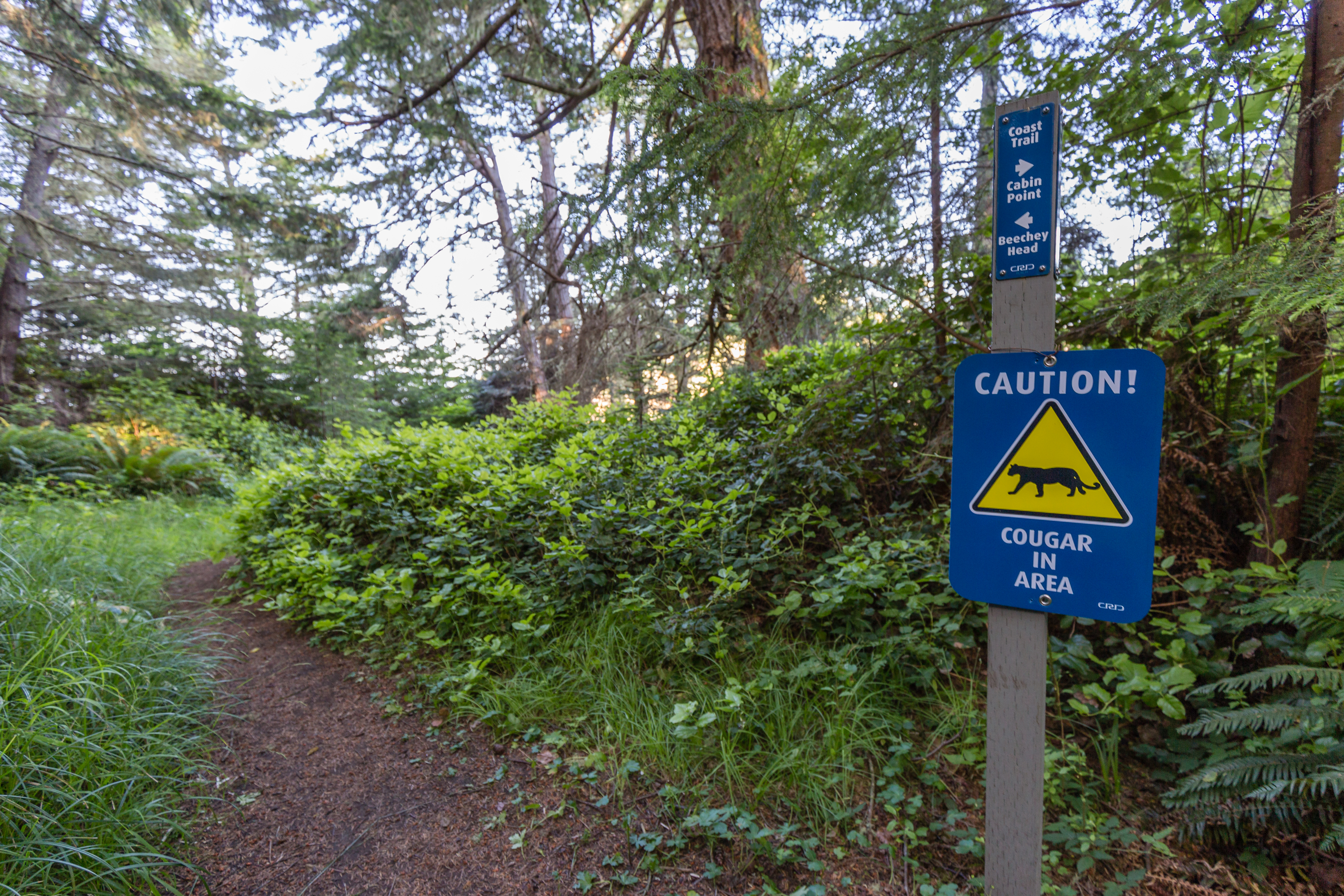
"Cougar in area" warning, East Sooke Regional Park, British Columbia, Canada

This is a list of known or suspected fatal cougar attacks that occurred in North America by decade in chronological order. The cougar is also commonly known as mountain lion, puma, mountain cat, catamount, or panther. The sub-population in Florida is known as the Florida panther.

Over 130 attacks have been reported in North America in the past 100 years, with 29 attacks resulting in fatalities. Fatal cougar attacks are extremely rare and occur much less frequently than fatal snake bites, fatal lightning strikes, or fatal bee stings. Whereas adult humans are not usually viewed as prey by cougars, young children can be considerably more vulnerable. The majority of the child victims listed here were not accompanied by adults.

As of 1991, Beier documented only 9 fatal attacks (and 44 nonfatal attacks) resulting in 10 human deaths since 1890. Those not confirmed by Beier are indicated by a question mark (?). Some of the sources, particularly older ones and local newspapers, might not be reliable.

Up to 1990, the fatal attacks on Vancouver Island which are listed in this article agree with Beier's study. Fatal attacks in the US might be over-reported. For example, a case of "apparently killed and eaten" assumes killed by a cougar, yet could have been another animal. Another possibility is that a body was scavenged by various animals after an accidental death.

Twenty (38%) of the fifty-three attacks (total) between 1890 and 1990 occurred on Vancouver Island (British Columbia). There were 10 attacks in mainland British Columbia, 5 in Texas, 4 in California, 3 each in Alberta and Colorado, 2 each in Arizona, Montana, and Washington, and 1 each in New Mexico and Nevada. (These figures include non-fatal attacks.)

As with many predators, a cougar may attack if cornered, if a fleeing human stimulates their instinct to chase, or if a person "plays dead". Standing still may cause the cougar to consider a person easy prey. Exaggerating the threat to the animal through intense eye contact, loud shouting, and any other action to appear larger and more menacing may make the animal retreat.

Humans are capable of fending off cougars, as adult humans are generally larger. It is even possible for humans to win a fight against a cougar, such as the case of Travis Kauffman, who strangled a starving juvenile cougar to death when attacked while jogging. Fighting back with sticks and rocks, or even bare hands is often effective in persuading an attacking cougar to disengage, though one should be careful when bending down as it makes you look smaller which could encourage the cougar to attack. A person should walk away backwards when confronted by a cougar rather than turning your back on it and a person should avoid getting near a mother cougar's kittens.

? = cases not confirmed by Beier

== Before 1970 ==
Date	Victim	Location — Circumstances
? 21 August 1868	Child, 3	United States, Oregon, Lane County — "Killed by a Cougar" The Oregon Harold of 24 August contains the following: "On the 21st instant, a little child three years old, of Mr. Patton, living on Rear Creek, 3 mi (4.8 km) west of the Long Tom, in Lane county, was killed by a cougar. The child was playing in the yard and within, 10 ft (3.0 m) of the door of the dwelling, when the cougar sprang upon it from the bushes which grew near the house. The mother seeing the beast drag her child towards the timber, seized a stick and started in pursuit. She attacked the cougar with such resolution that it dropped its burden, and the heroic woman taking the lifeless body under one arm and her only remaining child under the other, made her way to a neighbor's house, 0.5 mi (0.80 km) distant. Mr. Patton was absent from home at the time."
19 June 1890	Arthur Dangle, 7, Male	United States, California, Siskiyou County — Killed and eaten by two cougars while playing near his home in Quartz Valley.
? 11 November 1901	Frank Cook, age unknown, Male	Mexico, Baja California — The body of a Norwegian carpenter was found by hunters east of the Santa Caterina Landing. It was partially eaten. The hunters killed a nearby cougar.
? 1 March 1904	A. C. Marklein, age unknown, Male	United States, Kentucky, Magoffin County — Killed by a cougar in Bushy Cane Creek. The victim and a friend named McCarty both from New York state were attacked. Marklein received fatal injuries.
? 31 January 1909	Child Brown, 2 or 14 *NOTE: Probable false report	United States, California, Balboa — It was reported that a boy was attacked and killed while in a tent near Balboa. News stories variously reported his age as 2 and 14. A local paper reported the following day that the story was a hoax. The paper confirmed the local coroner never received a report of a child suffering a violent death in this manner.
? 5 July 1909	Isola Kennedy, 38, Female; Earl Wilson, 10, Male	United States, California, Santa Clara County, Morgan Hill — A rabid cougar attacked a woman and child. Both victims died from rabies, not from the physical injuries. This is the only instance of a double fatality and the only instance where the victims succumbed to disease rather than the injuries sustained in the attack.
? 21 August 1911	Child, 3	United States, Texas, Beaumont — Killed by a cougar inside his family home.
17 December 1924	Jimmie Fehlhaber, 13, Male	United States, Washington, Olema — Attacked and killed as he tried to outrun a cougar for about 100 yards (91 m).
19 June 1949	Norman Taylor, 7, Male	Canada, British Columbia, Kyuquot — Killed and eaten while walking on a beach.
? 1951	Unknown, Female	Mexico, Tamaulipas, Tampico — A woman was killed by a mountain lion.
? June 1953	Elena Salzar, 5, Female	Mexico, Tamaulipas, Tampico — The girl was attacked on a farm 20 mi (32 km) from Tampico. She was dragged off by the mountain lion, only her clothes were discovered two days later.

== 1970s ==
Date	Victim	Location — Circumstances
2 January 1971	John Lawrence Wells, 12, Male	Canada, British Columbia, near Lytton — Wells was attacked and killed by male cougar while he was playing with his sisters.
? 20 January 1974	Kenneth Clark Nolan, 8 or 9, Male	United States, New Mexico, Arroyo Seco — Killed by a 3-year-old female cougar while on a hike.
14 July 1976	Mathilda Mae Samuel, 7, Female	Canada, British Columbia, near Gold River — Killed by cougar while walking on a road.

== 1980s ==
Date	Victim	Location — Circumstances
16 May 1988	Jesse Sky Bergman, 9, Male	Canada, British Columbia, near Tofino — Stalked and killed by a four-year-old male cougar at Catface Mountain.
9 September 1989	Jake Thomas Gardipee, 5, Male	United States, Montana, Missoula County, near Evaro — Attacked and killed by a cougar while playing behind his home. The cougar was later killed, and a necropsy was performed at the Montana State University veterinary lab, establishing the cougar's role in the child's death.

== 1990s ==
Date	Victim	Location — Circumstances
14 January 1991	Scott Lancaster, 18, Male	United States, Colorado, Idaho Springs — Killed and eaten while jogging a familiar route on a hill above Clear Creek High School.
5 May 1992	Jeremy Williams, 7, Male	Canada, British Columbia, Kyuquot — Attacked and killed by a young female cougar while playing in the school yard.
23 April 1994	Barbara Barsalou Schoener, 40, Female	United States, California — Long distance runner and Placerville resident was attacked and killed while jogging on the American River Canyon Trail in Auburn State Recreation Area.
10 December 1994	Iris M. Kenna, 56, Female	United States, California — Killed while hiking alone near Cuyamaca Peak in Cuyamaca Rancho State Park.
19 August 1996	Cindy Parolin, 36, Female	Canada, British Columbia, Tulameen — Mother killed while defending her 6-year-old son on a horseback riding trip.
17 July 1997	Mark Miedema, 10, Male	United States, Colorado — Killed by an adult female cougar in Colorado's Rocky Mountain National Park while hiking when he got ahead of his family.
2 October 1999	Jaryd Atadero, 3, Male	United States, Colorado — Went missing during a religious hiking trip in the Arapaho & Roosevelt National Forest, partial remains discovered in 2003. NOTE: this case is highly contentious and experts vary in opinion as to whether or not this was an official cougar attack.

== 2000s ==
Date	Victim	Location — Circumstances
2 January 2001	Frances Frost, 30, Female	Canada, Alberta — This Canmore resident was killed by a cougar while skiing on Cascade Fire Road near Lake Minnewanka in Banff National Park.
8 January 2004	Mark Jeffrey Reynolds, 35, Male	United States, California, Orange County — Attacked, killed and partially devoured while mountain biking at Whiting Ranch Wilderness Park. It is believed his chain fell off and the cougar attacked when he bent down to repair his bicycle. His family Terri, Gary and Dona started the Mark J. Reynolds Memorial "Children's First Bike Fund" which provides bicycles and helmets to underprivileged children.
24 June 2008	Robert Nawojski, 55, Male	United States, New Mexico, Pinos Altos — Searchers found his partially devoured body on this date near his mobile home. Investigators concluded that he had been attacked, killed and eaten by a cougar several days earlier.

== 2010s ==
Date	Victim	Location — Circumstances
19 May 2018	S.J. Brooks, 32, Male	United States, Washington, near North Bend — Killed by a cougar while biking in the foothills near North Bend. Another bicyclist was injured, and the cougar was found and killed later that day.
11 September 2018	Diana Bober, 55, Female	United States, Oregon — Killed by a cougar in Mount Hood National Forest on the Hunchback Mountain Trail. The first in Oregon’s recorded history.

== 2020s ==
Date	Victim	Location — Circumstances
23 March 2024	Taylen Robert Claude Brooks, 21, Male	United States, California, El Dorado County, near Georgetown — A cougar jumped and killed a 21-year-old who, in company with his 18-year-old brother, was out looking for shed ungulate antlers in a forested area. The brother was also injured during the attack.
1 January 2026	Kristen Marie Kovatch, 46, Female	United States, Colorado, Larimer, Near Estes Park - A group of hikers on the Crosier Mountain trail noticed a mountain lion near a person lying down from about 100 yards away just after noon. The hikers began to scare the mountain lion away by throwing rocks, and it ran away. One of the witnesses was a physician who did not find a pulse on the victim.

== See also ==
- Animal attacks
- List of fatal alligator attacks in the United States
- List of fatal bear attacks in North America
- List of fatal dog attacks
- List of fatal snake bites in the United States
- List of wolf attacks
- List of wolf attacks in North America
- Man-eater
- Death of Jaryd Atadero

== Notes ==
- "Fatal Mountain Lion Attacks". Southeastern Outdoors.
- "List of Mountain Lion Attacks on People in California".
- "Mountain Lion Killing Baby a Faked Story" Santa Ana Register, Santa Ana, California. 1 February 1909. Page 5. Retrieved 30 January 2019, via Newspapers.com.
