= Gordon River Road =

Road in Tasmania, Australia

Gordon River Road Tasmania

General information
- Type: Road
- Length: 85 km (53 mi)
- Route number(s): B61

Major junctions
- East end: Lyell Highway; Rosegarland
- Glenora Road
- West end: Strathgordon, Tasmania

Location(s)
- Region: South West Tasmania
- Major suburbs: Bushy Park, Westerway, Maydena

The Gordon River Road, sometimes called the Strathgordon Road, (B61), is a road in the south western region of Tasmania, Australia.

The 85-kilometre (53 mi) road was built by the Hydro-Electric Commission of Tasmania with funding from the Australian Government to service the construction of the Gordon and the Serpentine dams, leading to the flooding of Lake Pedder.

In 1963 the Tasmanian Government successfully approached the Commonwealth for a $5 million grant to finance road construction from Maydena to the Middle Gordon River. In a submission never released to the public, the Hydro-Electric Commission described the provision of road access as a matter of urgency

Construction of the road commenced in January 1964.

== Route ==
It commenced at Maydena and passes north of the headwaters of the Florentine River (to the north) and the Weld River to the south at a location known as Tim Shea which is at an altitude of 952 metres (3,123 ft) above sea level and provides views north and north east to the Mount Field National Park.

It turns south, and at Frodshams Pass the Scotts Peak Dam Road (C607) continues south to the eastern shores of the modified Lake Pedder, then to Edgar Dam, and finally to Scotts Peak Dam. The Gordon River Road continues west from Frodshams Pass, passes Mount Wedge and the Sentinel Range to the south, and passes through the location of Strathgordon before ending at the Gordon Dam.

The road is the major man-made intrusion into the area of the World Heritage Wilderness area, and with the Scott Peak Dam Road is the most south western road in Tasmania. It is the main means of vehicular access for tourist buses and other transport to view the man made dams from the Lake Pedder damming. The road is bounded by the Mount Field National Park near its commencement, the Southwest National Park to its south, and the Franklin-Gordon Wild Rivers National Park to its north.

== See also ==
- List of highways in Tasmania
