= Scotts Peak =

Mountain in Tasmania, Australia

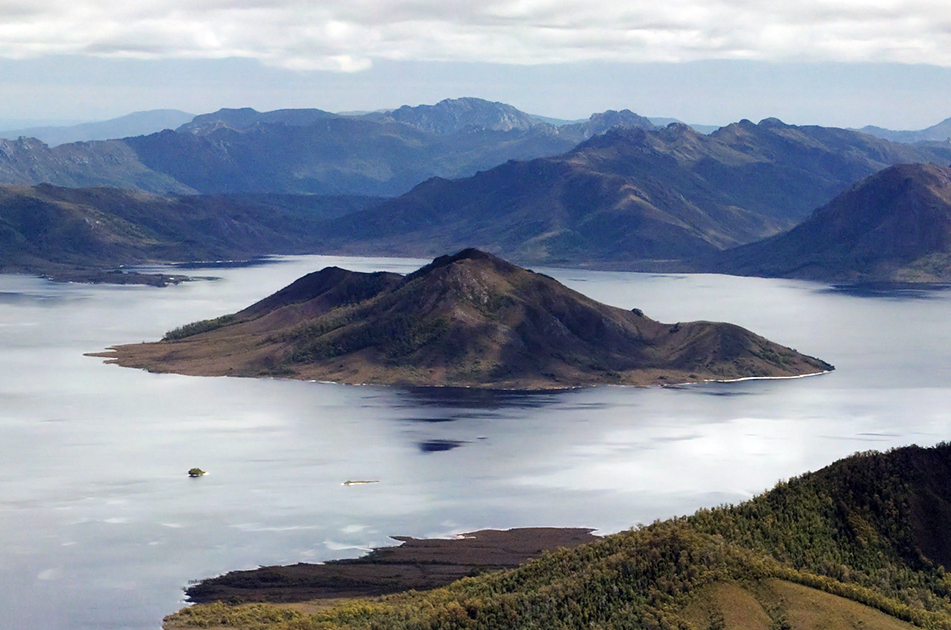
Scotts Peak

Scotts Peak is a mountain in South West Tasmania which is associated with the construction and flooding of the original Lake Pedder, as the lake now completely surrounds the peak. It lies east of the Frankland Range and has an elevation of 669 metres.

There is a Scotts Peak Dam and a Scotts Peak Dam Road in the region.

Scotts Peak is accessible by Scotts Peak Dam Road and the Lake Pedder boat ramp. Many people kayak across the reservoir to hike Scotts Peak.

== Climate ==
Due to its far south-western location, this site is frequently lashed by severe weather; with a mean annual wind speed of 27.1 kilometres per hour (16.8 mph), peaking at a mean of 32.9 kilometres per hour (20.4 mph) in September. Cloud cover is likewise extreme, with precipitation falling on 269 days of the year and as much as 27 days in July. Snow is a common occurrence throughout the year and can even occur in the summer.

Climate data for Scotts Peak Dam (1998–2023); 408 m AMSL; 43.04° S, 146.27° E
Month	Jan	Feb	Mar	Apr	May	Jun	Jul	Aug	Sep	Oct	Nov	Dec	Year
Record high °C (°F)	38.6 (101.5)	35.9 (96.6)	37.5 (99.5)	29.1 (84.4)	22.0 (71.6)	15.7 (60.3)	17.1 (62.8)	22.5 (72.5)	25.2 (77.4)	30.6 (87.1)	34.8 (94.6)	37.9 (100.2)	38.6 (101.5)
Mean daily maximum °C (°F)	21.4 (70.5)	21.1 (70.0)	18.5 (65.3)	14.9 (58.8)	11.6 (52.9)	9.8 (49.6)	9.3 (48.7)	10.4 (50.7)	12.5 (54.5)	14.9 (58.8)	17.8 (64.0)	19.1 (66.4)	15.1 (59.2)
Mean daily minimum °C (°F)	9.5 (49.1)	9.4 (48.9)	8.5 (47.3)	6.9 (44.4)	5.5 (41.9)	4.1 (39.4)	3.3 (37.9)	3.4 (38.1)	4.4 (39.9)	5.2 (41.4)	6.9 (44.4)	8.1 (46.6)	6.3 (43.3)
Record low °C (°F)	2.6 (36.7)	3.3 (37.9)	1.3 (34.3)	−0.4 (31.3)	−1.1 (30.0)	−1 (30)	−2.3 (27.9)	−2.1 (28.2)	−1.6 (29.1)	−1 (30)	−0.5 (31.1)	1.5 (34.7)	−2.3 (27.9)
Average precipitation mm (inches)	92.8 (3.65)	82.8 (3.26)	122.1 (4.81)	131.4 (5.17)	193.2 (7.61)	183.0 (7.20)	214.2 (8.43)	227.0 (8.94)	205.6 (8.09)	161.9 (6.37)	114.4 (4.50)	141.5 (5.57)	1,869.9 (73.62)
Average precipitation days (≥ 0.2 mm)	17.3	16.0	19.5	21.9	26.0	25.9	27.2	26.5	25.2	23.9	19.8	20.0	269.2
Average afternoon relative humidity (%)	58	59	66	74	82	86	85	81	76	69	62	63	72
