= Lake Pedder planarian =

Conservation status
- Near Threatened (IUCN 3.1)

Scientific classification
- Kingdom: Animalia
- Phylum: Platyhelminthes
- Order: Tricladida
- Family: Dugesiidae
- Genus: Romankenkius
- Species: R. pedderensis

Binomial name
- Romankenkius pedderensis Ball, 1974

Species of flatworm

The Lake Pedder planarian (Romankenkius pedderensis) is a species of invertebrate in the family Dugesiidae. This species was gregarious within the aquatic community of the lake before it flooded, living alongside small fish and invertebrates such as the Pedder galaxias and Lake Pedder earthworm.

== Distribution and conservation status ==
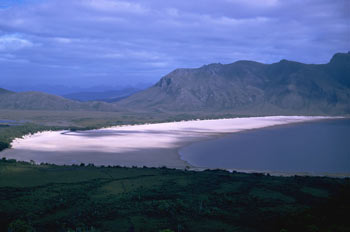
Lake Pedder, c. 1970

The species is endemic to the Lake Pedder area in Tasmania, Australia. This species has been listed as extinct by the IUCN Red List of Threatened Species in the past, but live specimens of this species were collected in 2006 and the ongoing existence of the species was again confirmed in 2012.
