= Lake Edgar =

Lake in Tasmania, Australia

- Location within Tasmania Location within Australia

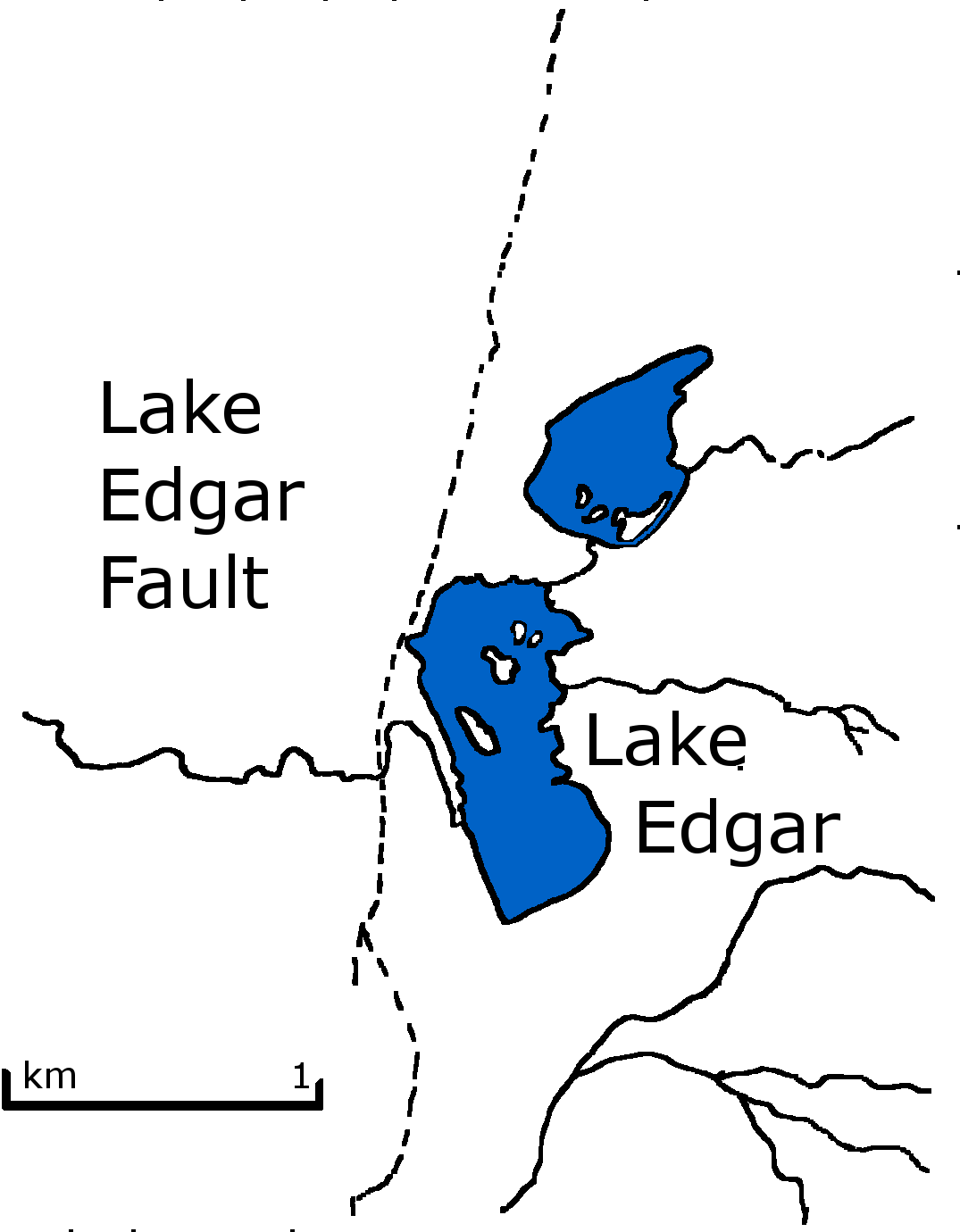
- Map
- Location: South West Tasmania
- Coordinates: 43°01′15″S 146°20′28″E
- Type: former lake, Fault scarp pond
- Primary inflows: Huon River
- Primary outflows: Huon River
- Basin countries: Australia
- Surface area: 1.4 square kilometres (0.54 sq mi)
- Max. depth: 3 metres (9.8 ft)
- Surface elevation: 289 metres (948 ft)

Lake Edgar was a natural fault scarp pond on the upper reaches of the Huon River in South West Tasmania.

== Description ==
Lake Edgar was actually two small lakes that were created when the Edgar fault caused the plains below Mount Anne, on the upper reaches of the Huon River, to move upwards by little more than 6 metres (20 ft), causing the river to dam and divert northwards around Scotts Peak. The lake was eventually inundated when the Lake Pedder was flooded as part of a hydroelectric power scheme in 1972. Lake Edgar should not be confused with the Edgar pond which was created when the Edgar Dam intersected one of the smaller tributaries of Lake Edgar.

The Lake Edgar Fault originally formed in the Cambrian as a sinistral wrench fault with a displacement of 12 kilometres (7.5 mi). It was reactivated in the Quaternary. The fault passes through the west part of the Edgar Dam. The fault is about 25–33 kilometres (16–21 mi) long. the fault dips to the west 60–70 degrees. The fault ruptured twice in the Quaternary period, with the early rupture around 25 kiloares (27,000,000 sq ft) and the last rupture since glaciation (less than 10 kiloares (11,000,000 sq ft)). The two Quaternary ruptures each elevated the western side by 2.5 metres (8 ft 2 in). This is the only fault known to have ruptured twice in the Quaternary period. The fault was discovered by Carey and Newstead in 1960. It cracks up Precambrian rocks in the Jubilee Element. The fault dammed up the water to form a lake. This was later split by partial draining. Lake Edgar is the southern of the two small lakes formed. Average rainfall is 2,500 millimetres (98 in) per year. Sediment would have rapidly filled the lake if it was old. The earthquakes associated with the formation of the uplifts would be of magnitude 6.6 to 7.

The fault separated graphitic phyllite in the east from metasiltstone, argillite, quartz sandstone conglomerate on the west. The Hydro Electric Commission dug a trench through the fault and dug pits to determine if water would leak through the fault when the Edgar Dam was built. The fault possibly continues through weak talc containing ultrabasic rocks and into the Gell River Fault about 30 kilometres (19 mi) north, which has an older Late Pleistocene displacement.

The filling of the new Lake Pedder reservoir was correlated with some increased seismicity from 1972-1978.

== See also ==
- Lake Pedder
- List of reservoirs and dams in Australia § Tasmania
- List of lakes of Australia § Tasmania
