= Weld Valley =

Valley in Tasmania, Australia

Geography
- Location: South West Tasmania, Australia
- Population centers: Huonville
- Coordinates: 42.95°S 146.6°E
- Rivers: Weld River
- Interactive map of Weld Valley

Weld
- Location of mouth of the Weld River in Tasmania
- Etymology: Mount Weld / Weld Valley

Location
- Country: Australia
- State: Tasmania

Physical characteristics
- Source: Mount Mueller
  - coordinates: 42°47′29″S 146°25′57″E
  - elevation: 868 m (2,848 ft)
- Mouth: Huon River
  - location: Arve Plains
  - coordinates: 43°3′21″S 146°46′1″E
  - elevation: 56 m (184 ft)
- Length: 53 km (33 mi)

Basin features
- River system: Huon River catchment
- Tributaries
  - right: Snake River
- National park: Southwest National Park

The Weld Valley is a valley in southern Tasmania. It is an area of Aboriginal cultural heritage and natural history within the Tasmanian Wilderness World Heritage Area. The valley stretches north-west of Huonville and is approximately 50 kilometres (31 mi) west of Hobart.

== River ==
The Weld River, one of two rivers of the same name located in Tasmania, rises below Mount Mueller in the Tasmanian Wilderness, south west of Maydena and the Styx River and just south of the Gordon River Road, 4 kilometres (2.5 mi) east of the southern shores of Lake Gordon. The Weld River flows from its source near Lake Gordon to its confluence with the Huon River on the Arve Plains. The river descends 811 metres (2,661 ft) over its 53-kilometre (33 mi) course.

== Caves ==
The Weld Valley is home to a number of archaeological caves which contain evidence of human use dating back to at least 20,000 years ago. Bone Cave approximately is 29,000 years old.

== See also ==
- List of rivers of Australia § Tasmania
- List of valleys of Australia § Tasmania
