= Edgar Dam =

- Location of the dam in Tasmania
- Interactive map of Edgar Dam
- Country: Australia
- Location: South West Tasmania
- Coordinates: 43°01′45″S 146°20′50″E
- Purpose: Power
- Status: Operational
- Opening date: 1973
- Owner: Hydro Tasmania

Dam and spillways
- Type of dam: Earth fill dam
- Impounds: Off stream
- Height: 17 m (56 ft)
- Length: 460 m (1,510 ft)
- Dam volume: 96×10^{3} m^{3} (3.4×10^{6} cu ft)
- Spillways: none

Reservoir
- Creates: Lake Pedder
- Total capacity: 2,937.93 GL (2,381,820 acre⋅ft)
- Catchment area: 734 km^{2} (283 sq mi)
- Surface area: 24,133 ha (59,630 acres)
- Maximum water depth: 43 m (141 ft)
- Normal elevation: 291 m (955 ft) AHD
- Website hydro.com.au

The Edgar Dam is an earth-fill embankment saddle dam, located offstream in the South West region of Tasmania, Australia.

Completed in 1973 as part of the Gordon River Power Development Scheme, the resultant reservoir, Lake Pedder, formed with the Scotts Peak Dam and the Serpentine Dam, was established for the purpose of generation of hydroelectricity via the Gordon Power Station, a conventional hydroelectric power station located 55 kilometres (34 mi) to the northwest of the dam wall. The impoundment flooded Lake Edgar, a naturally-forming fault scarp pond.

The Edgar Dam, together with the Scotts Peak and Serpentine dams, are some of the few dams and reservoirs owned and operated by Hydro Tasmania that do not have an adjacent hydroelectric power station. The dam draws its name from the flooded Lake Edgar.

== Dam overview ==
Location

The Edgar Dam, completed in 1973 by the Hydro Electric Corporation (TAS), together with the Scotts Peak and Serpentine dams, are three major dams that form the headwaters for the Gordon River Power Development Scheme. The dam is located near Lake Pedder's most easterly point where the Huon River descends from the Marsden Range into what is now known as the Huon Basin. In a straight line, the Gordon Power Station is 55 kilometres (34 mi) to the north west of the dam wall; or approximately 100 kilometres (62 mi) by road.

Also at the southern end of the Lake Pedder, the Scotts Peak Dam impounds the Huon River. At the northwestern end of the lake, the Serpentine Dam across the Serpentine River is impounded into Lake Pedder.

Technical details

The earth-filled dam wall is 17 metres (56 ft) high and 460 metres (1,510 ft) long. When full, Lake Pedder has capacity of 2,937.93 gigalitres (2,381,820 acre⋅ft) and covers 24,133 hectares (59,630 acres), drawn from a catchment area of 734 square kilometres (283 sq mi). The dam wall does not have a spillway.

Water use

The water in Lake Pedder provides around 40% of the water used in the Gordon Power Station. This non-hydroelectric dam helps retain water in the new impoundment, that is diverted to Lake Gordon (formed by the Gordon Dam) via the McPartlan Pass Canal. (Note: The canal is located at 42°50′51″S 146°11′45″E.) Water from Lake Gordon then exits through the Gordon Dam and into the Gordon River.

== History ==
In early 1967, Eric Reece, (Note: Reece subsequently earned the epithet of Electric Eric, in view of his stanch support of hydroelectricity.) the Premier of Tasmania, announced plans to flood the natural Lake Pedder and the legislation was debated in the Tasmanian Parliament several days later. A small environmental movement was formed, which mobilised in the 1980s to stop the proposed Franklin River Dam. In 1972, Reece controversially approved the three dams and hence, the flooding of Lake Pedder, which proceeded despite a determined environmental protest movement and a blank cheque offer from his Labor colleague, Prime Minister Gough Whitlam, to preserve the area. Reece refused Whitlam's offer, stating that he would 'not have the Federal Government interfering with the sovereign rights of Tasmania.' Reece retrospectively commented:

There was a National Park out there, but I can't remember exactly where it was ... at least, it wasn't of substantial significance in the scheme of things. The thing that was significant was that we had to double the output of power in this state in 10 years in order [to] supply the demands of industry and the community. And this was the scheme that looked as though it could do a greater part of [the] job for us.

Environmental protests and political lobbying continued. It was claimed that the Tasmanian Government had contravened the National Parks and Wildlife Act (TAS), resulting in the passage of retrospective legislation that confirmed construction of the three dams could continue. Reece commented at the time, "As far as Lake Pedder is concerned, the sooner they fill it up the better."

== Lake Edgar Fault ==
The Lake Edgar Fault is a 30-kilometre-long (19 mi) north–south trending scarp that occurs within the boundary of the Southwest National Park. The scarp traverses the button grass of the Huon Plains and is notable because faulting resulted in the defeat of westerly flowing drainage and the consequent formation of the fault-bound sag pond of Lake Edgar. In January 2001 a tremor measuring 3.2 on the Richter magnitude scale occurred near the Lake Edgar fault, which runs adjacent to the Edgar Dam, however damage was negligible.

In 2002 it was reported that a dam safety manager from Hydro Tasmania, was confident that the eventuality of the Edgar dam being destroyed by an earthquake was an extremely remote possibility, with a University of Tasmania geophysicist agreeing that the risk of collapse was remote.

In 2024 planning began for a strengthening project designed to improve Edgar Dam's earthquake resilience.

In 2025 there was a magnitude 4 earthquake in the area and, under pressure from the Greens, released modelling as part of a freedom of information request which showed that in the event of dam failure, Huonville would be inundated by waters up to 9m. The annual risk was estimated at 1 in 10,000 before dam upgrades, and 1 in a million after.

== Dam strengthening works ==
In 2025, Hydro Tasmania began dam strengthening works, scheduled to be completed in mid-late 2026.

== See also ==
- List of reservoirs and dams in Tasmania
- Franklin Dam controversy
