= Serpentine Dam (Tasmania) =

Dams in Tasmania, Australia

- Location of the dam in Tasmania
- Interactive map of Serpentine Dam
- Country: Australia
- Location: South West Tasmania
- Coordinates: 42°46′34″S 145°58′57″E
- Purpose: Power
- Status: Operational
- Opening date: 1971
- Owner: Hydro Tasmania

Dam and spillways
- Type of dam: Rock-fill dam
- Impounds: Serpentine River
- Height: 38 m (125 ft)
- Length: 134 m (440 ft)
- Dam volume: 127×10^{3} m^{3} (4.5×10^{6} cu ft)
- Spillways: 1
- Spillway type: Controlled
- Spillway capacity: 242 m^{3}/s (8,500 cu ft/s)

Reservoir
- Creates: Lake Pedder
- Total capacity: 2,937.93 GL (2,381,820 acre⋅ft)
- Catchment area: 734 km^{2} (283 sq mi)
- Surface area: 24,133 ha (59,630 acres)
- Maximum water depth: 43 m (141 ft)
- Normal elevation: 291 m (955 ft) AHD
- Website hydro.com.au

The Serpentine Dam is an embankment dam across the Serpentine River, in the South West region of Tasmania, Australia. Completed in 1971 as part of the Gordon River Power Development Scheme, the resultant reservoir, Lake Pedder, formed with the Edgar Dam and the Scotts Peak Dam, was established for the purpose of generation of hydroelectricity via the Gordon Power Station, a conventional hydroelectric power station located 5 kilometres (3.1 mi) north of the dam wall. The impoundment flooded the original Lake Pedder, much of the Serpentine river, and Lake Edgar, a naturally-forming fault scarp pond.

The Serpentine Dam, together with the Edgar and Scotts Peak dams, are some of the few dams and reservoirs owned and operated by Hydro Tasmania that do not have an adjacent hydroelectric power station.

== Dam overview ==
Location

The Serpentine Dam, completed in 1971 by the Hydro Electric Corporation (TAS), together with the Edgar and Scotts Peak dams two years' later, are three major dams that form the headwaters for the Gordon River Power Development Scheme. The dam is located at the lake's most northwesterly point where the Serpentine River descends from the Frankland Range into what is now known as the Pedder Reach. In a straight line, the Gordon Power Station is 5 kilometres (3.1 mi) north of the dam wall, directly accessible by a public road.

At the southern end of Lake Pedder, the Scotts Peak Dam impounds the upper reaches of the Huon River into the lake. The Edgar Dam, a saddle dam, is located near the lake's most easterly point, where the Huon River descends from the Marsden Range into what is now known as the Huon Basin.

Technical details

The concrete-faced rock-fill dam wall is 38 metres (125 ft) high and 134 metres (440 ft) long. When full, Lake Pedder has capacity of 2,937.93 gigalitres (2,381,820 acre⋅ft) and covers 24,133 hectares (59,630 acres), drawn from a catchment area of 734 square kilometres (283 sq mi). The dam's controlled spillway is capable of discharging 242 cubic metres per second (8,500 cu ft/s).

Water use

The water in Lake Pedder provides around 40% of the water used in the Gordon Power Station. This non-hydroelectric dam helps retain water in the new impoundment, that is diverted to Lake Gordon (formed by the Gordon Dam) via the McPartlan Pass Canal. (Note: The canal is located at 42°50′51″S 146°11′45″E.) Water from Lake Gordon then exits through the Gordon Dam and into the Gordon River.

== History ==
In early 1967, Eric Reece, (Note: Reece subsequently earned the epithet of Electric Eric, in view of his stanch support of hydroelectricity.) the Premier of Tasmania, announced plans to flood the natural Lake Pedder and the legislation was debated in the Tasmanian Parliament several days later. A small environmental movement was formed, which mobilised in the 1980s to stop the proposed Franklin River Dam. In 1972, Reece controversially approved the three dams and hence, the flooding of Lake Pedder, which proceeded despite a determined environmental protest movement and a blank cheque offer from his Labor colleague, Prime Minister Gough Whitlam, to preserve the area. Reece refused Whitlam's offer, stating that he would 'not have the Federal Government interfering with the sovereign rights of Tasmania.' Reece retrospectively commented:

There was a National Park out there, but I can't remember exactly where it was ... at least, it wasn't of substantial significance in the scheme of things. The thing that was significant was that we had to double the output of power in this state in 10 years in order [to] supply the demands of industry and the community. And this was the scheme that looked as though it could do a greater part of [the] job for us.

Environmental protests and political lobbying continued. It was claimed that the Tasmanian Government had contravened the National Parks and Wildlife Act (TAS), resulting in the passage of retrospective legislation that confirmed construction of the three dams could continue. Reece commented at the time, "As far as Lake Pedder is concerned, the sooner they fill it up the better."

The construction of the Serpentine Dam resulted in the loss of one of the significant sub-populations of the endangered Centrolepis pedderensis (a small herbaceous plant), while the nearby Gordon Dam caused the loss of another. It is now only known to exist in one location on the Frankland Range.

== See also ==
- List of reservoirs and dams in Tasmania
- Franklin Dam controversy
