= Scotts Peak Dam Road =

Road in Tasmania, Australia

Scotts Peak Dam Road Tasmania
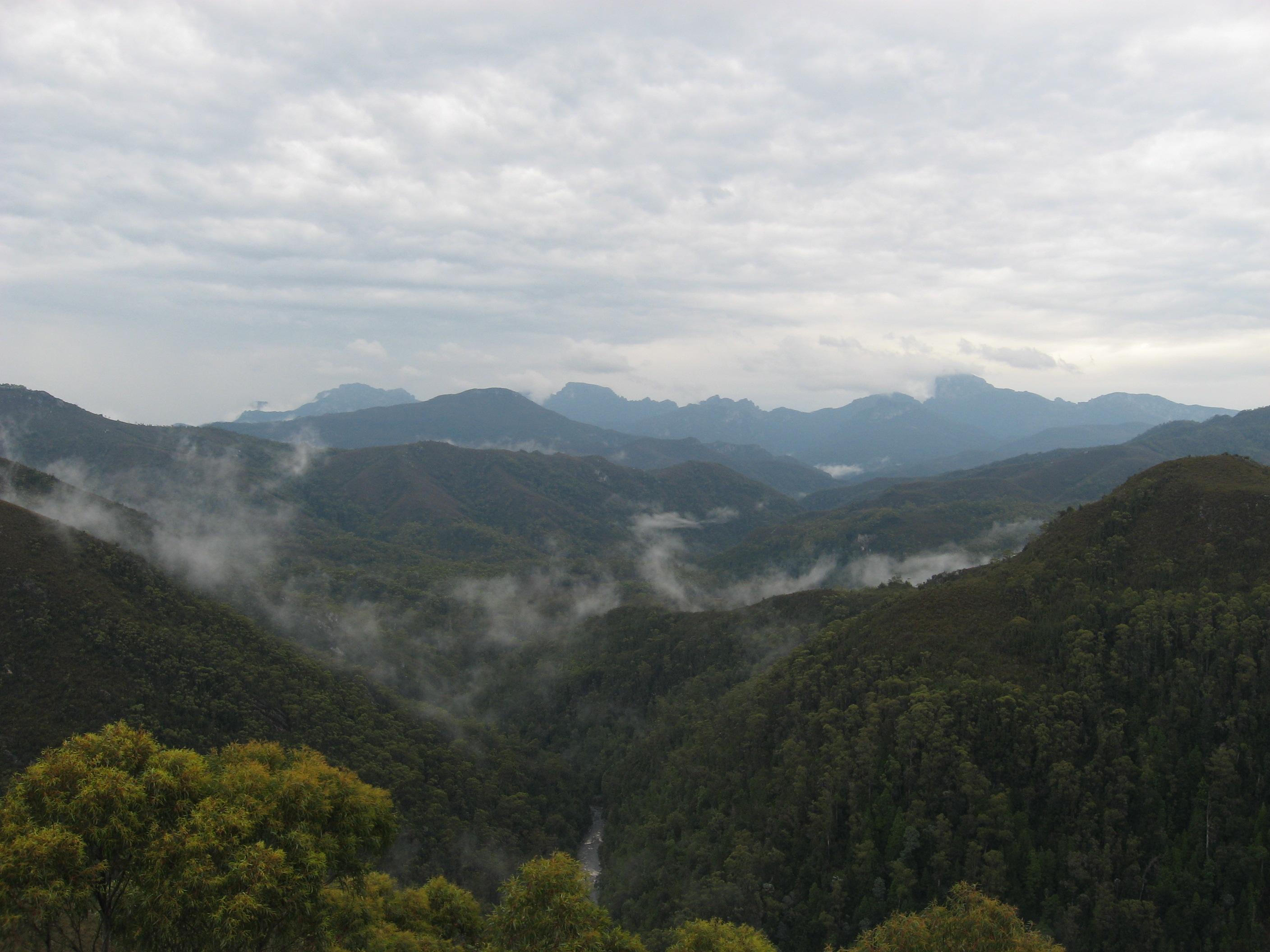
- A view from the Scotts Peak Dam Road looking across the Southwest National Park

General information
- Type: Road
- Length: 47 km (29 mi)
- Route number(s): C607

Major junctions
- North end: Gordon River Road; Frodshams Pass
- Edgar Dam
- South end: Scotts Peak Dam; Huon River; Huon Campground

Location(s)
- Region: South West Tasmania

The Scotts Peak Dam Road (Route C607) is the most southerly point of road access into Southwest National Park, Tasmania, Australia.

The road was built by the Hydro-Electricity Commission of Tasmania with funding from the Australian Government to facilitate the construction of dams for the flooding of Lake Pedder. It was an unsealed road built to connect between the dam works and the Gordon River Road. The 47-kilometre (29 mi) road leaves the Gordon River Road at Frodshams Pass and heads south and provides access to Edgar Dam and the Scotts Peak Dam across the Huon River. The road terminates at the Huon Campground, an access point for the Frankland Range and the South Coast region of the South West Wilderness.
