= Mount Anne =

Mountain in Tasmania, Australia

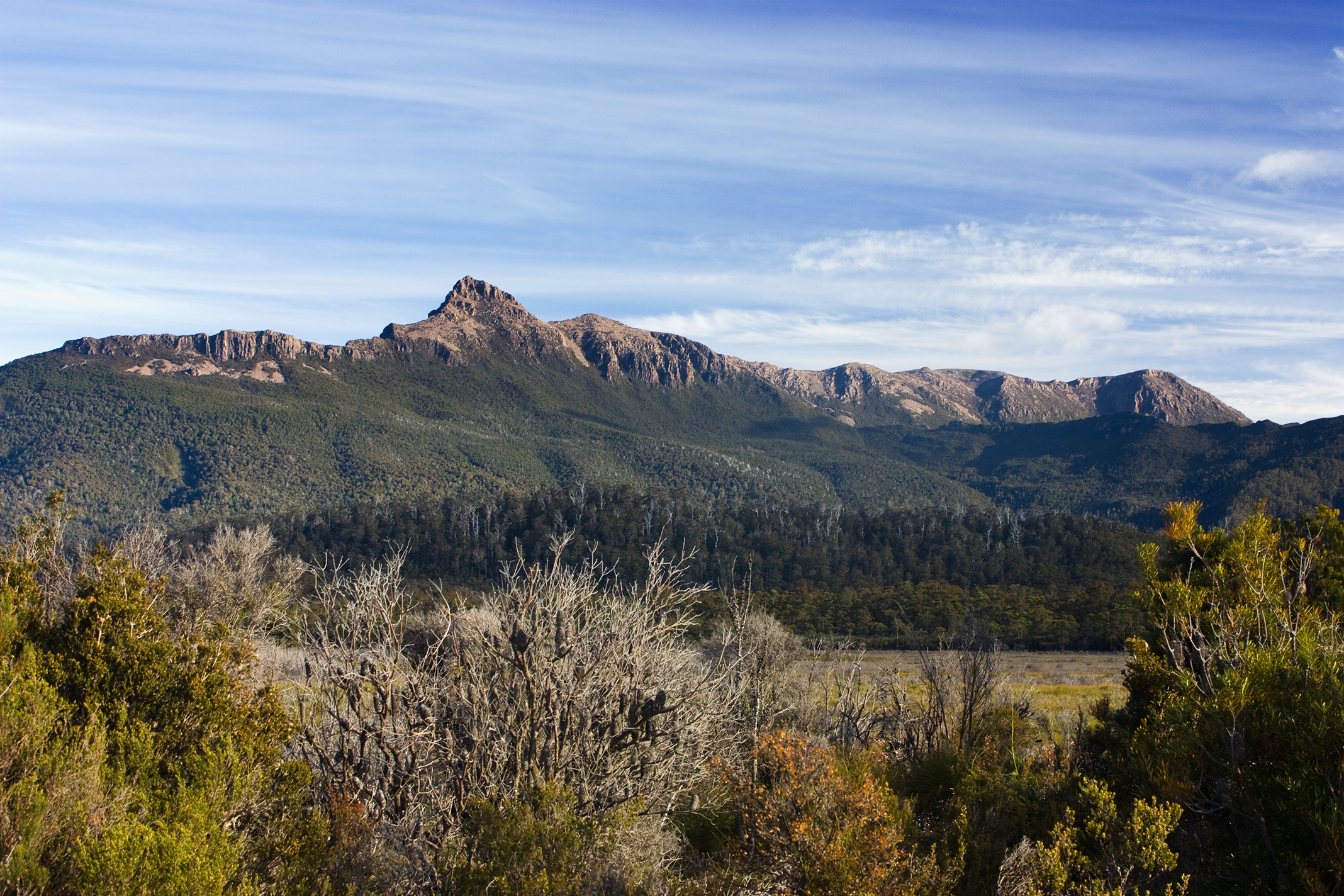
- Mount Anne, Mount Eliza and the Eliza Plateau from Scotts Peak Dam Road

Highest point
- Elevation: 1,423 m (4,669 ft)AHD
- Prominence: 963 m (3,159 ft)
- Isolation: 32.15 km (19.98 mi)
- Coordinates: 42°56′35″S 146°25′26″E

Geography
- Location within Tasmania
- Location: South West Tasmania, Australia

Geology
- Rock age: Jurassic
- Mountain type: Dolerite

Climbing
- First ascent: 25 December 1929 by Walter Crookall and Geoff Chapman

Mount Anne is a mountain located in the Southwest National Park in south-west region of Tasmania, Australia. The mountain lies within the UNESCO World Heritage-listed Tasmanian Wilderness.

With an elevation of 1,423 metres (4,669 ft) above sea level, Mount Anne is within the forty highest mountains in Tasmania, and is the highest in south-west Tasmania, adding to its appearance of prominence. It dominates the area surrounding Lake Pedder.

== Location and features ==
Although a primarily dolerite structure, it has a large sub-structure of dolomite, which contains an extensive cave system. This system includes the famous 'Anna-a-Kananda' cave — one of the deepest caves in Australia. Several cavers have been killed trying to explore its depths.

Mount Anne has a superb region of ancient Gondwanan-type vegetation on its north-east ridge, some of which are amongst the oldest surviving plant species on the planet.

== History ==
Mount Anne was named by George Frankland after his wife, Georgina Anne in 1835. Henry Judd reached the Mount Anne Plateau from the Huon Valley in 1880. Walter Crookall and Geoff Chapman, members of the Hobart Walking Club found a way to the top on 25 December 1929. The long hike from Maydena or Huonville became a day-walk after the construction of the Scotts Peak Dam Road in 1970.

A hut was constructed on the nearby Mt Eliza by the Hobart Walking Club in 1974 to ease access to the mountain.

Mount Anne is a common bushwalking destination for experienced walkers, the Mount Anne circuit is a 4-day walk that can include summiting Mount Anne.

== Gallery ==
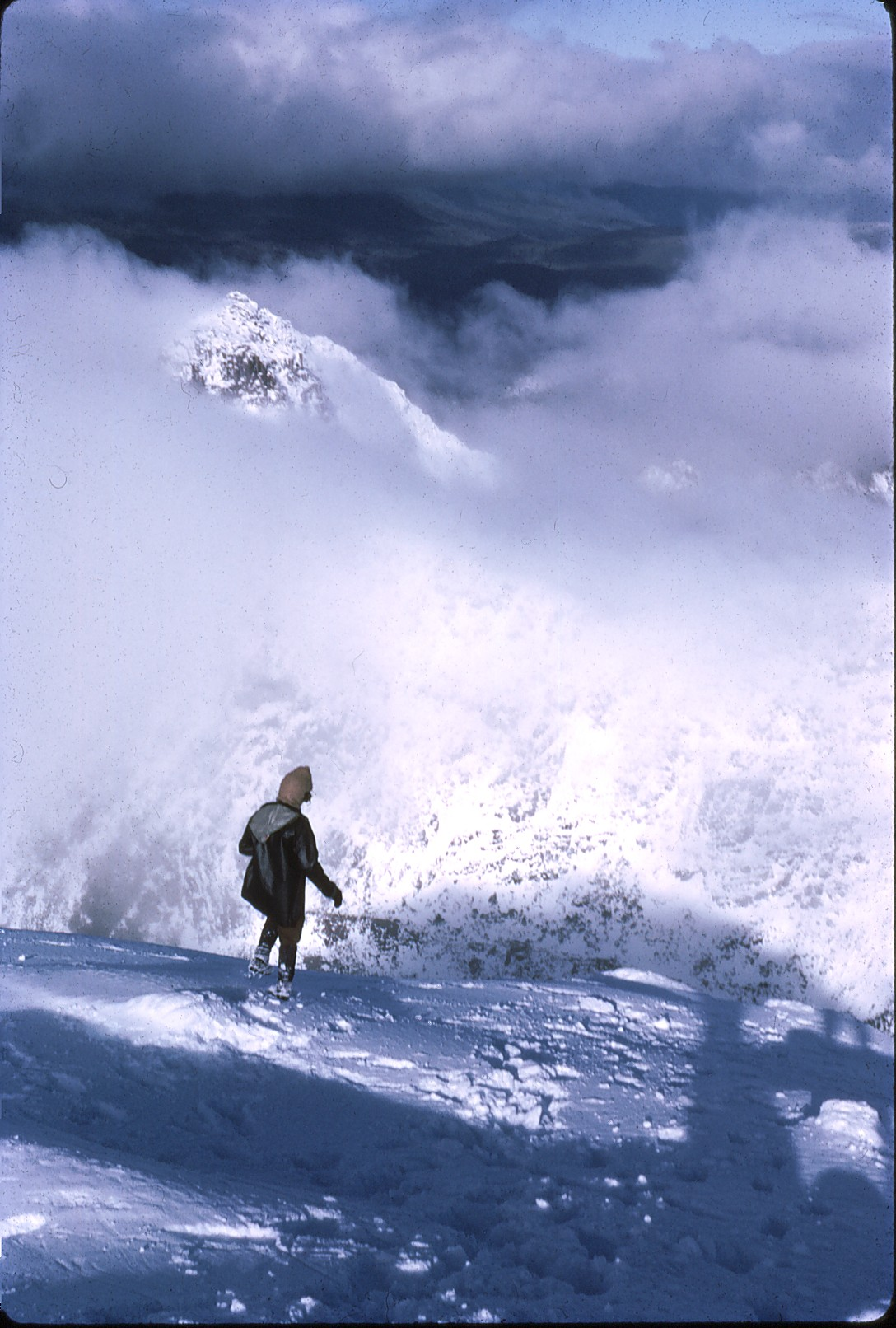
Mount Anne summit, 1972

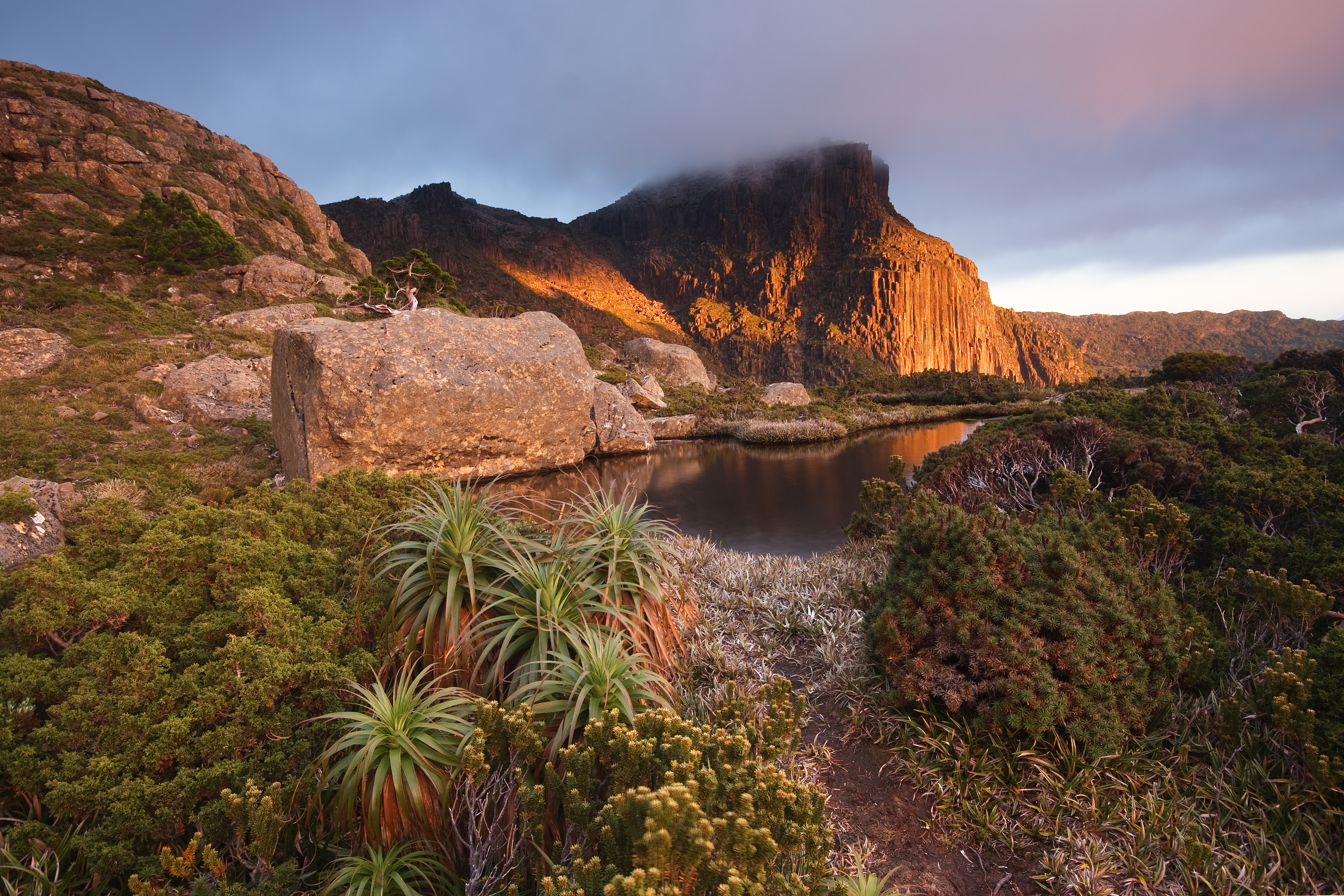
Mt Anne from High Shelf Camp
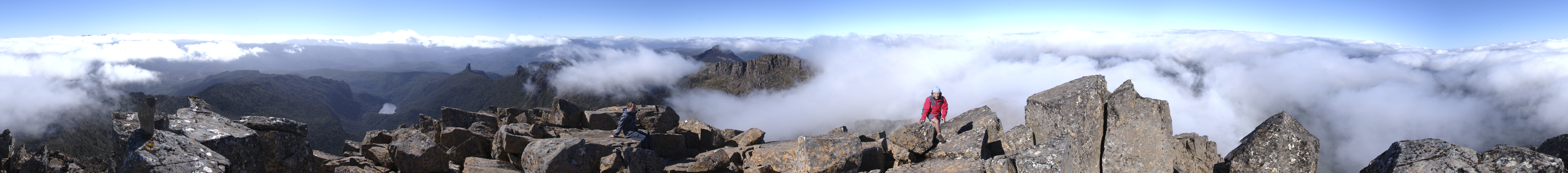
360° panorama from the peak of Mount Anne

== See also ==
- List of highest mountains of Tasmania
