= Romankenkius =

Scientific classification
- Kingdom: Animalia
- Phylum: Platyhelminthes
- Order: Tricladida
- Family: Dugesiidae
- Genus: Romankenkius; Ball, 1974

Species
- see text

Genus of worms

Romankenkius is a genus of freshwater planarian in the family Dugesiidae.

== Species ==
The following species are recognised in the genus Romankenkius:

- Romankenkius bilineatus Ball & Tran, 1979
- Romankenkius conspectus Sluys & Grant, 2006
- Romankenkius flaccidus Sluys, 2018
- Romankenkius glandulosus Kenk, 1930
- Romankenkius hoernesi Weiss, 1909
- Romankenkius impudicus Sluys & Grant, 2006
- Romankenkius kenki Ball, 1974
- Romankenkius libidinosus Sluys & Rohdes, 1991
- Romankenkius patagonicus (Borelli, 1901)
- Romankenkius pedderensis Ball, 1974 (Lake Pedder planarian)
- Romankenkius retrobursalis Sluys & Grant, 2006
- Romankenkius sinuosus Sluys & Kawakatsu, 2001
