= Scotts Peak Dam =

Dam in Tasmania, Australia

- A non-hydroelectric dam which helps to retain water in Lake Pedder, pictured in 1975

- Location of the dam in Tasmania
- Interactive map of Scotts Peak Dam
- Country: Australia
- Location: South West Tasmania
- Coordinates: 43°01′50″S 146°17′47″E
- Purpose: Power
- Status: Operational
- Opening date: 1973
- Owner: Hydro Tasmania

Dam and spillways
- Type of dam: Rock-fill dam
- Impounds: Huon River
- Height: 43 m (141 ft)
- Length: 1,067 m (3,501 ft)
- Dam volume: 584×10^{3} m^{3} (20.6×10^{6} cu ft)
- Spillways: none

Reservoir
- Creates: Lake Pedder
- Total capacity: 2,937.93 GL (2,381,820 acre⋅ft)
- Catchment area: 734 km^{2} (283 sq mi)
- Surface area: 24,133 ha (59,630 acres)
- Maximum water depth: 43 m (141 ft)
- Normal elevation: 291 m (955 ft) AHD
- Website hydro.com.au

The Scotts Peak Dam is a rock-filled embankment dam across the Huon River, in the South West region of Tasmania, Australia. Completed in 1973 as part of the Gordon River Power Development Scheme, the resultant reservoir, Lake Pedder, formed with the Edgar Dam and the Serpentine Dam, was established for the purpose of generation of hydroelectricity via the Gordon Power Station, a conventional hydroelectric power station located 50 kilometres (31 mi) to the northwest of the dam wall. The impoundment flooded Lake Edgar, a naturally-forming fault scarp pond.

The Scotts Peak Dam, together with the Edgar and Serpentine dams, are some of the few dams and reservoirs owned and operated by Hydro Tasmania that do not have an adjacent hydroelectric power station.

== Dam overview ==
Location

The Scotts Peak Dam, completed in 1973 by the Hydro Electric Corporation (TAS), together with the Edgar and Serpentine dams, are three major dams that form the headwaters for the Gordon River Power Development Scheme. The dam is located at the southern end of the Lake Pedder where it impounds the upper reaches of the Huon River. In a straight line, the Gordon Power Station is 50 kilometres (31 mi) to the north west of the dam wall; or approximately 90 kilometres (56 mi) by road.

Near Lake Pedder's most easterly point is the Edgar Dam, where the Huon River descends from the Marsden Range into what is now known as the Huon Basin. At the northwestern end of the lake, the Serpentine Dam across the Serpentine River is impounded into Lake Pedder.

Technical details

The bituminous concrete-faced rock-fill dam wall is 43 metres (141 ft) high and 1,067 metres (3,501 ft) long. When full, Lake Pedder has capacity of 2,937.93 gigalitres (2,381,820 acre⋅ft) and covers 24,133 hectares (59,630 acres), drawn from a catchment area of 734 square kilometres (283 sq mi). The dam wall does not have a spillway, but it does have a riparian outlet to maintain some flow down the Huon river.

In 2001, the dam received an Historic Engineering Marker from Engineers Australia as part of its Engineering Heritage Recognition Program. At the time, it was one of only two Australian dams completed with bituminous concrete facing.

Water use

The water in Lake Pedder provides around 40% of the water used in the Gordon Power Station. This non-hydroelectric dam helps retain water in the new impoundment, that is diverted to Lake Gordon (formed by the Gordon Dam) via the McPartlan Pass Canal. (Note: The canal is located at 42°50′51″S 146°11′45″E.) Water from Lake Gordon then exits through the Gordon Dam and into the Gordon River.

== History ==
In early 1967, Eric Reece, (Note: Reece subsequently earned the epithet of Electric Eric, in view of his stanch support of hydroelectricity.) the Premier of Tasmania, announced plans to flood the natural Lake Pedder and the legislation was debated in the Tasmanian Parliament several days later. A small environmental movement was formed, which mobilised in the 1980s to stop the proposed Franklin River Dam. In 1972, Reece controversially approved the three dams and hence, the flooding of Lake Pedder, which proceeded despite a determined environmental protest movement and a blank cheque offer from his Labor colleague, Prime Minister Gough Whitlam, to preserve the area. Reece refused Whitlam's offer, stating that he would 'not have the Federal Government interfering with the sovereign rights of Tasmania.' Reece retrospectively commented:

There was a National Park out there, but I can't remember exactly where it was ... at least, it wasn't of substantial significance in the scheme of things. The thing that was significant was that we had to double the output of power in this state in 10 years in order [to] supply the demands of industry and the community. And this was the scheme that looked as though it could do a greater part of [the] job for us.

Environmental protests and political lobbying continued. It was claimed that the Tasmanian Government had contravened the National Parks and Wildlife Act (TAS), resulting in the passage of retrospective legislation that confirmed construction of the three dams could continue. Reece commented at the time, "As far as Lake Pedder is concerned, the sooner they fill it up the better."

=== Cracks and repairs ===
Shortly after the dam's construction, cracks developed in the upstream face and it began to leak. The dam had a lower section composed of impermeable gravel, topped with coarser rock-fill, then reinforced by bituminous concrete. The gravel had a lower compressibility than the rock-fill, which caused cracking at 30m deep. The cracks were ultimately sealed in 1975-1976 by covering the face with silty gravel to fill the gaps.

== See also ==
- List of dams in Tasmania
- Franklin Dam controversy
