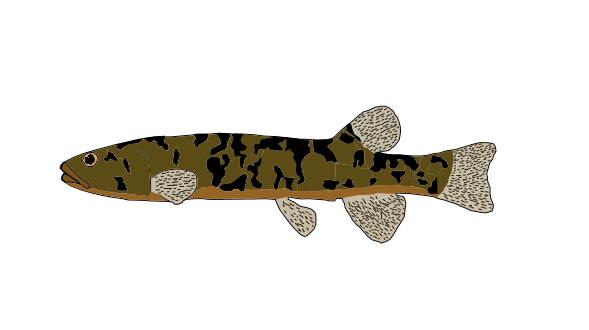

Conservation status
- Endangered (IUCN 3.1)

- Extinct in the Wild (EPBC Act)

Scientific classification
- Kingdom: Animalia
- Phylum: Chordata
- Class: Actinopterygii
- Division: Teleostei
- Order: Galaxiiformes
- Family: Galaxiidae
- Genus: Galaxias
- Species: G. pedderensis

Binomial name
- Galaxias pedderensis Frankenberg, 1968

= Pedder galaxias =

Species of fish

The Pedder galaxias (Galaxias pedderensis) is an Australian freshwater fish. It is considered to be extinct in the wild since 2005 by the EPBC Act, and was originally found only in Lake Pedder in Tasmania.

== Range ==
Originally recorded only in Lake Pedder and inflowing streams, after the construction of the Huon–Serpentine dam in 1972 (the "new" Lake Pedder), its range expanded initially into Lake Gordon and Wedge River. However, by 1980 it had become very rare and no new specimens have been captured in the wild since 1996. Introduced trout are implicated as a major factor in the decline of this species. The species survives in two translocated populations outside its original range, one at Lake Oberon in the Western Arthurs mountain range and one at a modified water supply dam near Strathgordon.

== Description ==
A small greenish-brown fish, off-white to silvery belly, a profuse irregular and highly variable pattern of alternating off-white and brownish contrasting bands extending into the base of the fins and breaking up into fine spots on the lower part of the sides. Length to 160 mm.

== Habitat ==
Before the construction of the new lake, this species preferred Lake Pedder itself which was quite shallow surrounded by white sandy beaches and small rooted aquatic vegetation as well as in swamps and low velocity waters with abundant instream organic debris and overhanging terrestrial vegetation.

Diet consists of small invertebrates, particularly arthropods and aquatic insect larvae, crustaceans and terrestrial insects especially beetles, flies, cicadas etc.

== Conservation status ==
- Extinct in the wild status for the EPBC Act since 2005.
- Listed as endangered by the IUCN since 2019.

== Reproduction ==
Females are larger than males. Male genital papilla narrow, whereas female are broad and rounded, most noticeable during breeding season. 150 to 1,200 eggs averaging 1.9 mm to 2.3 mm in diameter when water hardened. Spawning reported to occur in spring (October) at water temperatures of 6.7 to 7.5 °C.

== See also ==
- Arthurs paragalaxias
- Paragalaxias eleotroides
