= Romankenkius patagonicus =

Scientific classification
- Kingdom: Animalia
- Phylum: Platyhelminthes
- Order: Tricladida
- Family: Dugesiidae
- Genus: Romankenkius
- Species: R. patagonicus

Binomial name
- Romankenkius patagonicus (Borelli, 1901)

Synonyms
- Romankenkius michaelseni (Bohmig, 1902)(junior synonym); Cura michaelseni (Bohmig, 1902); Cura patagonica (Borelli, 1901); Curtisia patagonica (Borelli, 1901); Dugesia patagonica (Borelli, 1901); Planaria michaelseni Bohmig, 1902; Planaria patagonica Borelli, 1901

Species of flatworm

Romankenkius patagonicus is a species of freshwater triclad found in South America.
