= Lake Pedder =

Lake in South West Tasmania, Australia

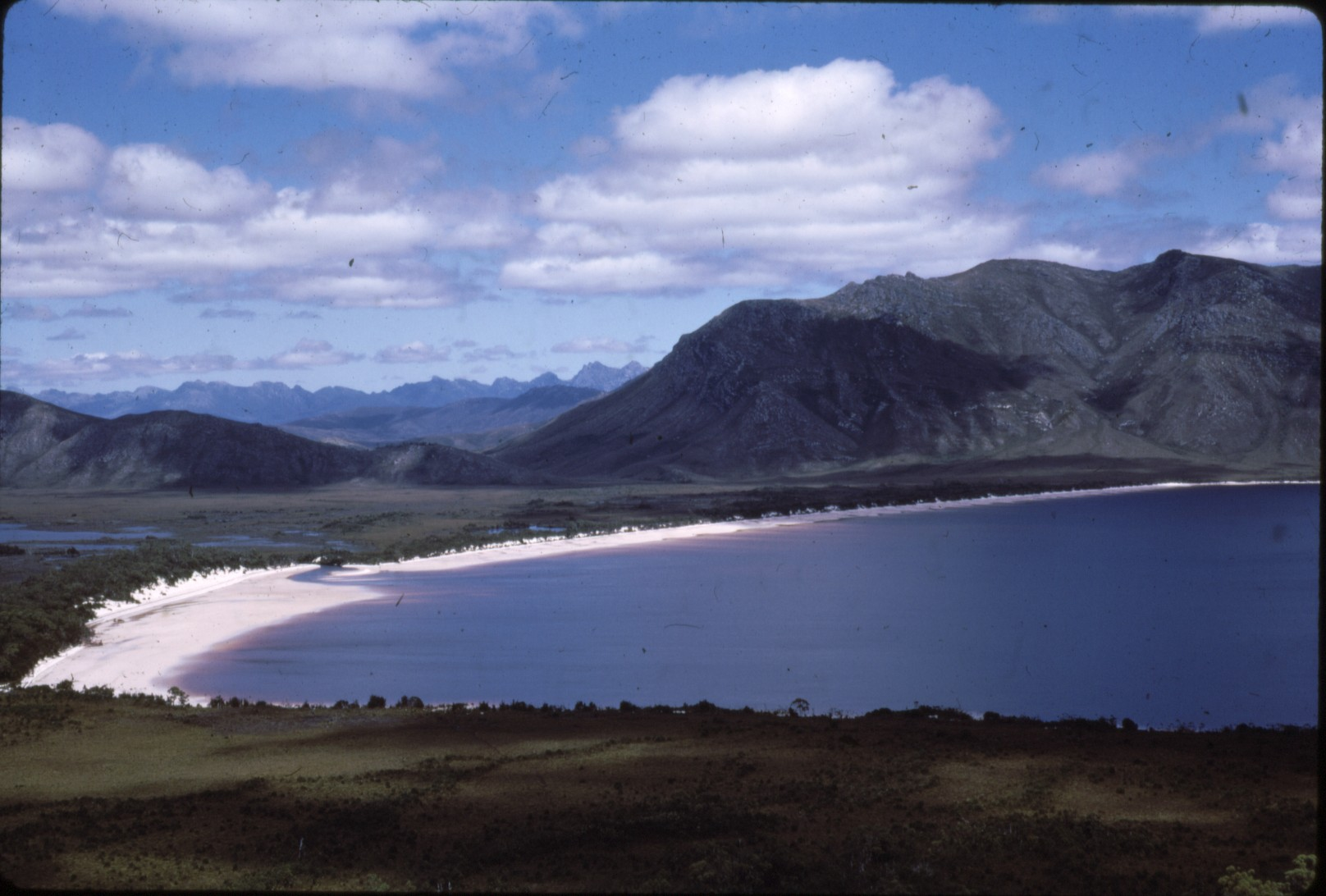
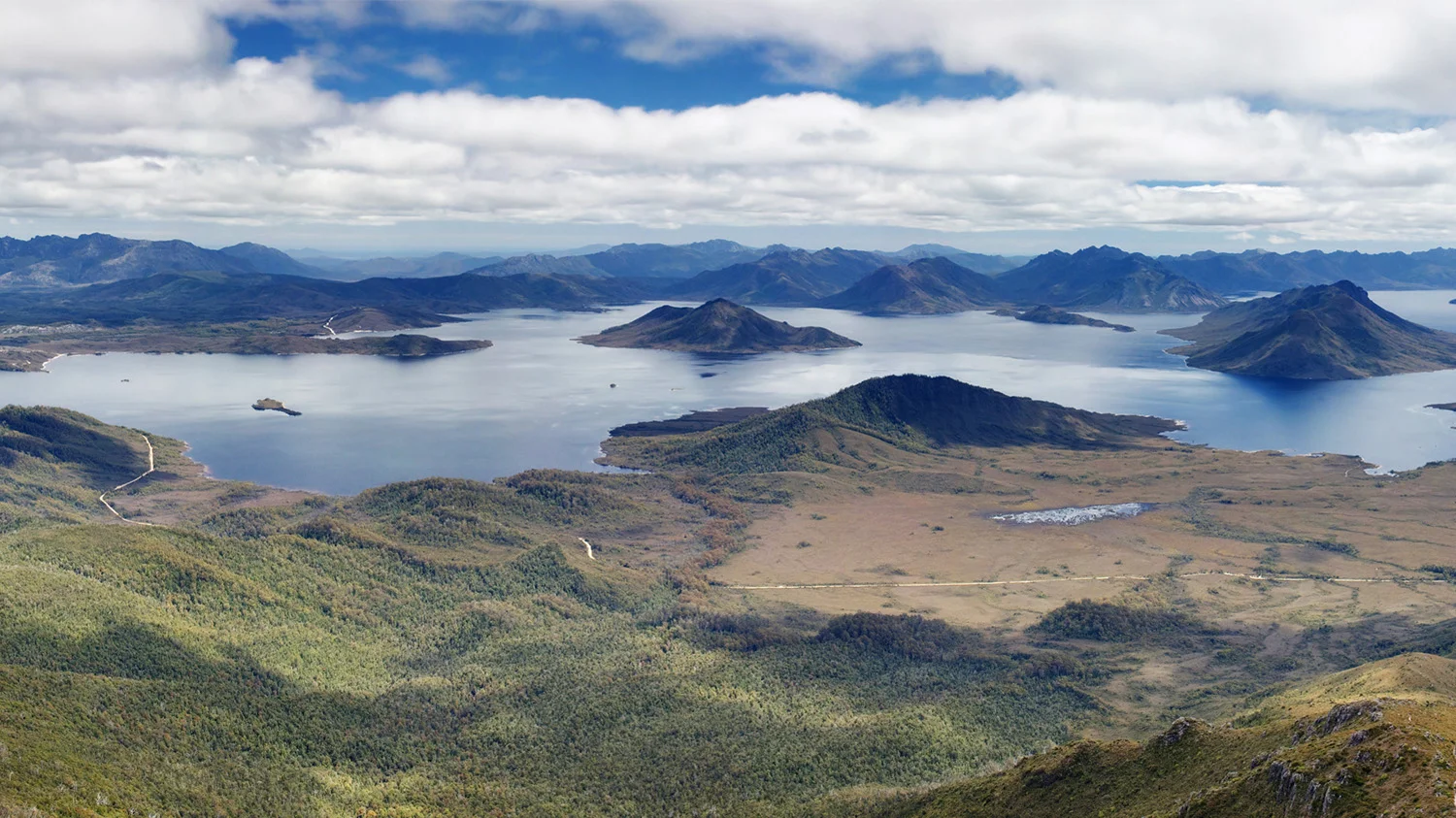
- Lake Pedder, c. 1970 (glacial lake) Lake Pedder, c. 2014 (reservoir)

- Location of the lake in Tasmania
- Map showing Lake Pedder in Tasmania
- Location: South West Tasmania
- Coordinates: 42°56′S 146°08′E
- Type: Natural, glacial outwash lake (until 1972); Reservoir, artificial impoundment, diversion pond (since 1972)
- Etymology: Sir John Pedder
- Part of: Upper Gordon River hydroelectric generation scheme
- Primary inflows: Frankland Range
- River sources: Serpentine River; Huon River
- Primary outflows: Serpentine River; Huon River
- Catchment area: 734 km^{2} (283 sq mi)
- Basin countries: Australia
- Construction engineer: Hydro Tasmania
- First flooded: 1972
- Surface area: 24,133 ha (59,630 acres)
- Average depth: 13–16 m (43–52 ft) (as a reservoir)
- Max. depth: +3 m (9.8 ft) (as a glacial lake); 43 m (141 ft) (as a reservoir)
- Water volume: 2,937.93 GL (2,381,820 acre⋅ft)
- Surface elevation: 300 m (980 ft) AHD
- Islands: 2 (as a glacial lake); 45 (as a reservoir)

Lake Pedder, once a glacial outwash lake, is an artificial reservoir and diversion lake located in South West Tasmania, Australia. In addition to its natural catchment from the Frankland Range, the lake was formed by the 1972 damming of the Serpentine and Huon Rivers by the Hydro-Electric Commission (TAS) (HEC) for the purpose of generating hydroelectricity at the Gordon Power Station.

The original Lake Pedder was renowned for its wild beauty, and community opposition to its flooding led to the formation of the first environmentalism based political party in the world, the United Tasmania Group, with one of its candidates going on to found the Tasmanian Greens. It also marked the end of unopposed damming of wild rivers in Tasmania by the HEC, with the next attempted dam drawing national and international condemnation until the project was abandoned.

With a size of approximately 242 km^{2}, the new Lake Pedder reservoir is Tasmania's second-largest lake and its waters are used to generate about 500GWh of electricity for Tasmania per year, or a bit under 6% of the state's requirements. It is a popular trout fishing location.

== Geomorphology ==
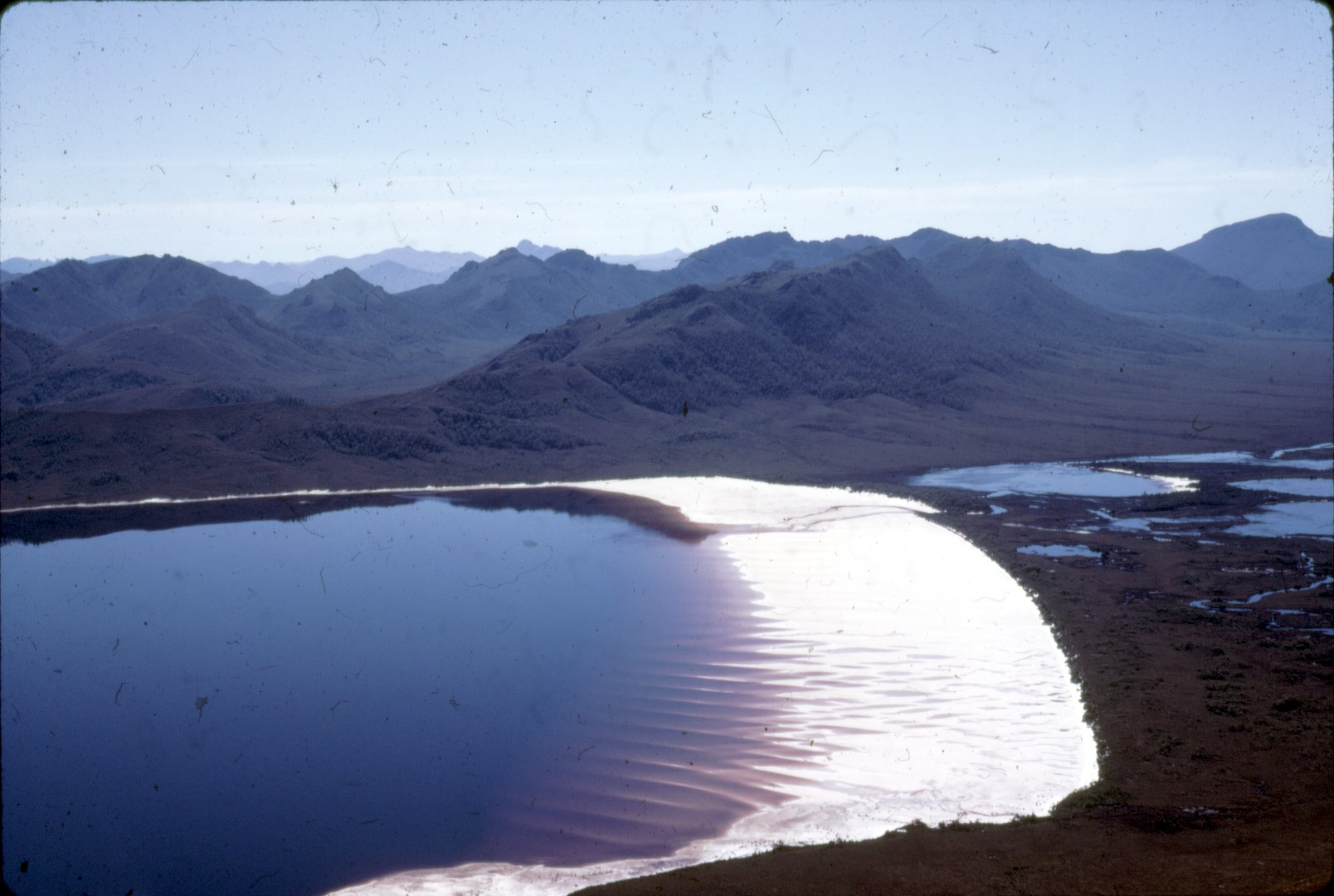
The original Lake Pedder as seen from the Frankland Ranges before it was dammed. The megaripples in the sand are visible, as are the Maria Lakes in the top right.

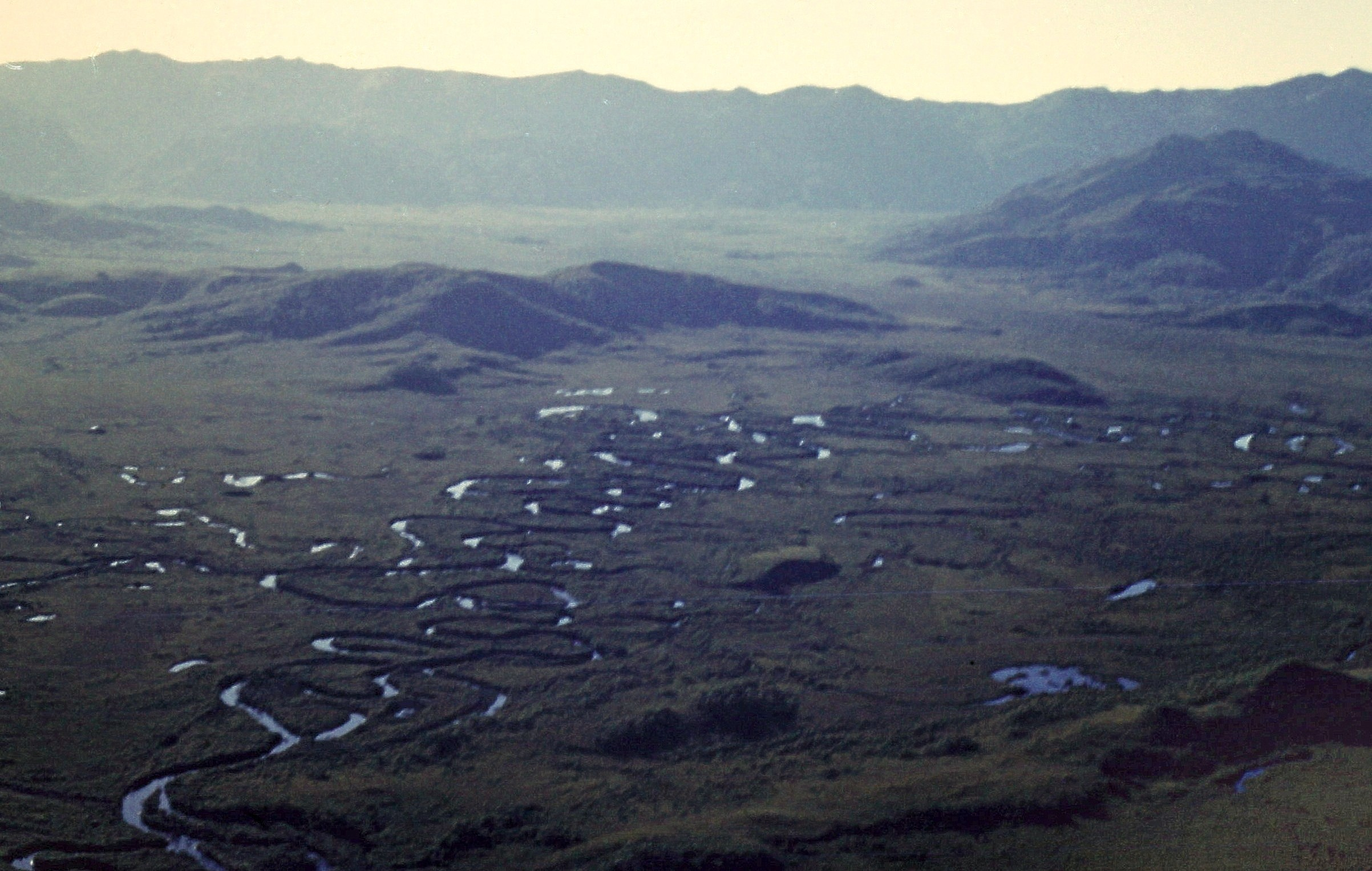
The Serpentine River before it was dammed

The original Lake Pedder was a glacial outwash lake, formed from sediment runoff from the Frankland Range, and located in the upper Serpentine river valley. Sitting at an altitude of 300m, it had a surface area of ~10 km^{2} in the winter but retracted in the drier Tasmanian summers exposing a wide beach with mega-ripples along its length - described as spectacular by researchers, activists and the Scenic board (National Parks precursor organisation).

A 1975 government enquiry described it as:

..possessed [of] an outstanding aesthetic quality, arising not from any one feature but from an interaction and interplay of many aspects which included the natural beauty of the beach, the lake and surrounding mountains, the varied reflections of the mountain and sky, the changing colours, lights and moods of the lake and its surroundings, and an overwhelming sense of majesty and solitude.

— Final report of the Lake Pedder Committee of Enquiry of the flooding of Lake Pedder - April 1974

In the context of protests against its inundation, Roy Fagan, the deputy premier called it "...a very charming lake, and it is a pity it has to be flooded".

It was a shallow lake, with a depth of ~3m, and drained into the Serpentine River. The surrounding Frankland Range is made of Precambrian quartzites, while the valley is phyllites and schist, with some carbonate rock. Immediately to the east of Lake Pedder there was a group of small lakes and swamps called the Maria Lakes which seasonally drained into Pedder.

There were unusual rocks found along the beach called Pedder Pennies.

A fault line with clear scarp landforms runs 11 km SE of the original lake, including two scarp ponds called Lake Edgar (now flooded).

The Serpentine River itself was meandering in its upper reaches with numerous oxbow lakes and peat bogs, but as it approached the Gordon River formed into a steep gorge (now flooded).

== Ecology ==
Lake Pedder had the highest number of endemic species for any lake in Australia, with numerous invertebrates only found on its shores, and several species of freshwater fish. The swamp galaxias is endemic to Lake Pedder and its tributaries, as was the Pedder Galaxias, now extinct in its native range.

The vegetation of the valleys around Lake Pedder varied from wetlands and buttongrass moorlands to eucalypt forests and rainforests.

== Early human history ==
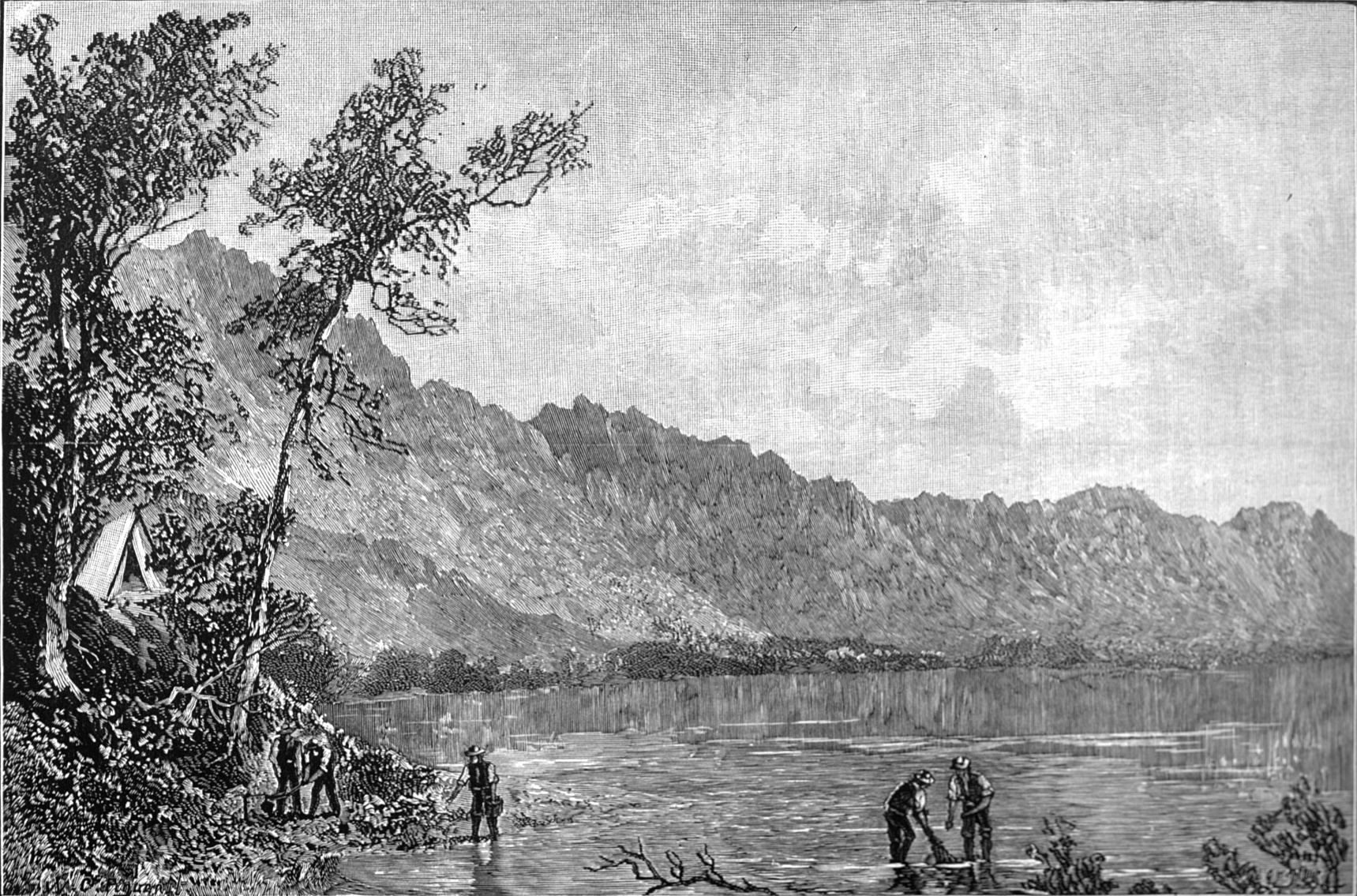
Lake Pedder engraved by George Collingridge (1888), from original sketch by William Piguenit

Aboriginal people have lived in Tasmania for approximately 35,000 years, crossing over the Bassian Plain from the mainland. Early Aboriginal heritage sites indicate that they occupied SW Tasmania from that time, until early European colonisation, however, there are no known heritage sites within the Lake Pedder reservoir. Aboriginal Tasmanians used fire to clear vegetation and control the movement of macropods, which may have contributed to the extent of the buttongrass plains around the Serpentine valley and wider SW.

European surveyors found Lake Pedder during a trigonometric survey in 1835, with surveyor John Wedge naming it after the first chief justice of Van Diemen's Land, John Pedder. The area was further explored by piners and later miners during the mineral rush of the early 1900s, however no significant deposits were found and the forests were remote and difficult to access. The landscape of the South West is extremely rugged, has poor soils and a difficult climate which made it unattractive for agriculture so it remained uninhabited.

As bushwalking and recreation became more popular throughout the 1900s, old mining huts and tracks were repurposed for recreation. Some of the same traits that made it unattractive for industry, remoteness, ruggedness and bad weather gave it, what McKenry of the Australian Conservation Foundation, described a "rugged natural beauty".

== National park ==
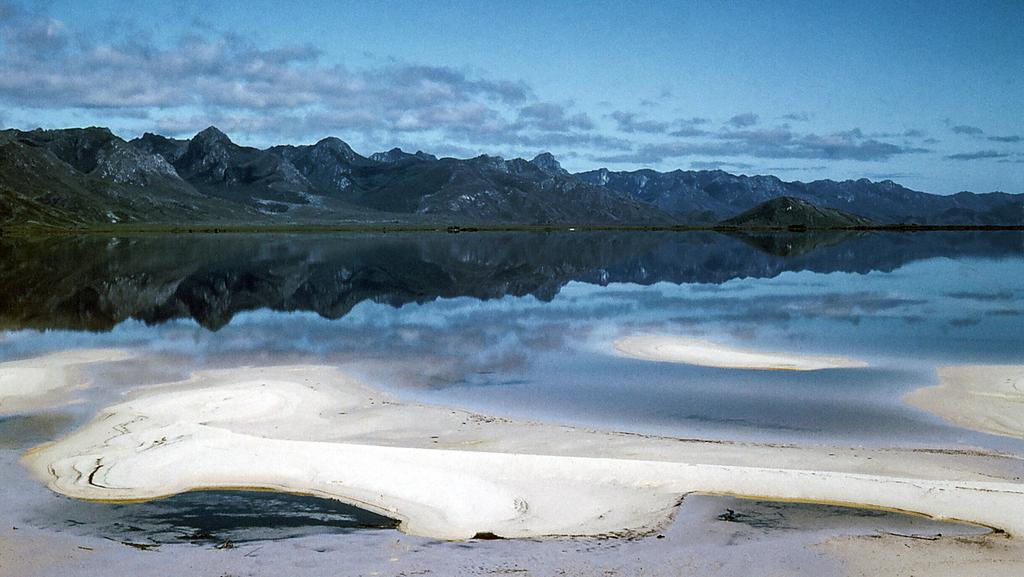
Lake Pedder in 1954 reflecting the Frankland Range

In 1954 the Hobart Walking Club approached the Scenery Preservation Board proposing to make the area surrounding Lake Pedder a national park. Pedder had become more accessible as people became richer in the post-war years, and the Aero Club of Southern Tasmania was able to land light single engine planes on its wide beach to drop off people and supplies. It was nominated due to both its beauty, and that there was no potential for mining or forestry development in the surrounds. However, noting that the HEC might be interested in damming the Serpentine river and lower Serpentine valley, they limited the national park to the upper reaches of the valley around Lake Pedder.

They were successful, and in 1955, Lake Pedder, and the surrounding 59,000 acres was declared a scenic reserve (the predecessor to a national park) called Lake Pedder National Park due to the beauty of the pink-white sands of the beach, ring of mountains and definable location.

== Damming ==
=== Internal HEC Plans ===
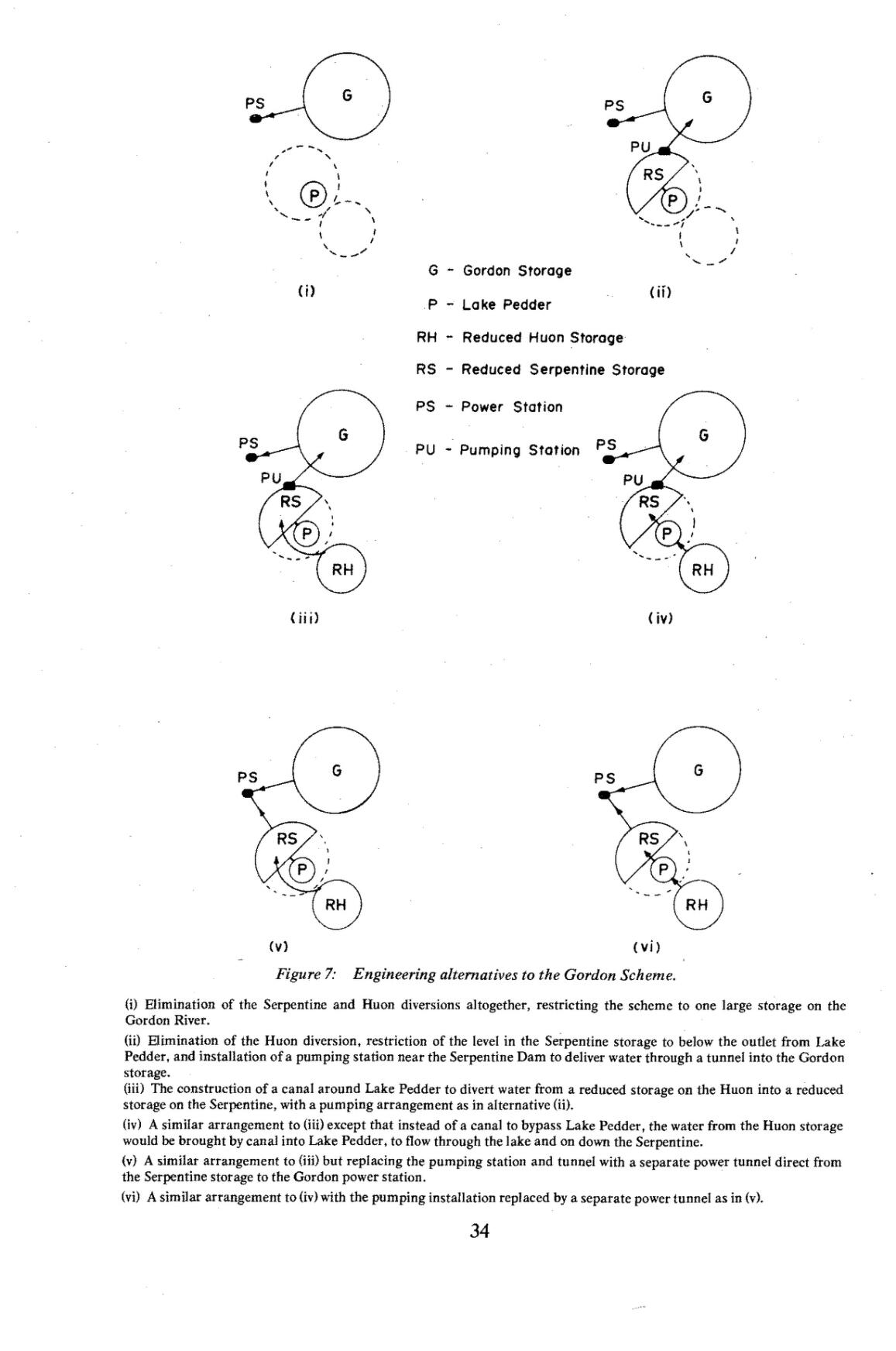
The alternative hydroelectric schemes considered by the HEC in the early 1960s for the Huon-Serpentine Impoundment which ultimately flooded Lake Pedder.

In the 1950s–60s the HEC was Tasmania's largest public corporation, employing approximately 4000 people, and was tasked with generating as much hydroelectricity as possible in accordance with the Tasmanian government's policy of attracting manufacturing industry to the state with the incentive of cheap power, known as hydro-industrialisation. It was successful as a hydroelectric dam building organisation and often pioneered new techniques in dam construction. The early dams were located in the more accessible parts of the state, including the Mersey River, Forth River and Central Highlands, but after those rivers were exhausted the HEC began to explore the more remote south west. It was not common for the public to be consulted on the HECs plans, it tended to "denigrate its opponents", and the full context of damming (loss of wilderness, cost-benefit analysis, flow of profit for cheap electricity) was not within their remit. Additionally, the government normally accepted the commission's recommendations without question. In contrast, the Snowy Mountains Hydro-electric Authority, which held a similar remit to build dams on the mainland, was more consultative.

As early as 1955, when the scenic board made Lake Pedder National Park, they were told by HEC Chief Commissioner Allan Knight that they had some designs to dam the Serpentine valley. However, it was a closed meeting so neither the wider public nor early environmentalists were aware.

By 1962 the HEC was actively planning to dam the Serpentine Valley, and, aware of the significance of Lake Pedder and the surrounding national park, was considering alternatives to drowning it. These included creating a lower Serpentine Dam and pumping water up to the Gordon, creating a tunnel to move water directly into the power station, routing water from the Huon around or through Lake Pedder, or abandoning the flow of the Huon. In 1963 the HEC received a $5 million commonwealth grant to build an explorative road towards the Gordon and Serpentine rivers to examine placing a new dam in the area. Although the grant details were not released to the public, the construction of the road was one of the few external indicators that they were planning to dam the area. B.W. Davis later noted that grant application noted that the roads "...somewhat circuitous route [would be] necessary to avoid areas which will subsequently be flooded by the Middle Gordon storages", indicating that the project layout was near finalised. In 1966 they formally decided to flood the entire Serpentine Valley, as it provided the most hydroelectric power at a minimum cost. However, these discussions were entirely internal, and a 1972 interim government enquiry concluded that the analyses of alternative dams were "inadequate on both technical and economic grounds".

=== Early conservationist reactions ===
In early 1962, conservationists became aware that the south west was less inherently remote and self-protecting than it used to be and formed the South West Committee to coordinate conservation and development, balancing wilderness and recreation with the electric and forestry industries. Requests for information were treated with "extreme reticence" and it was castigated by the Premier for interfering in public affairs, however in 1965 the Premier said there would be "some modification of the Lake Pedder National Park".

=== Public announcement ===
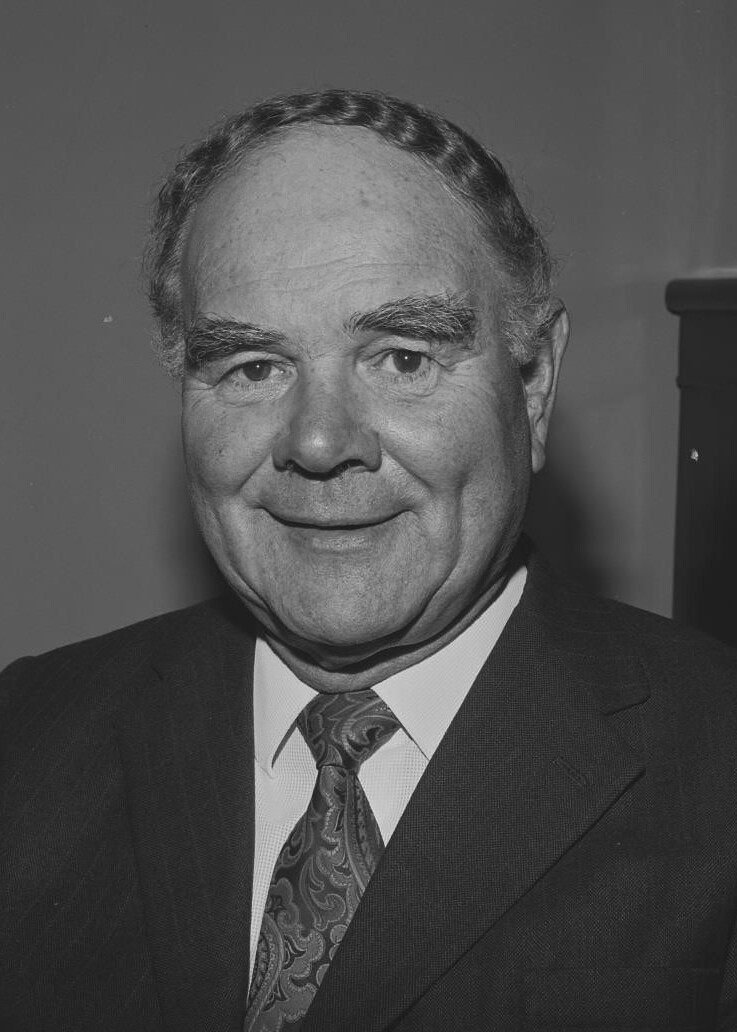
Eric Reece 1973 (cropped)

In 1967 HEC publicly recommended damming the middle Gordon river, installing a power station, and adding extra dams around the Serpentine valley to increase the reservoir size. It asserted that the new Lake Pedder would be larger and more attractive than the old. The entire Gordon scheme was costed at about $90 million and produce 500GWh of electricity per year.

This decision to flood Pedder attracted protests across Australia, before, during, and after construction of the dams. Tasmania's Premier Eric Reece, and Allan Knight, the HEC commissioner, were seen as the leading proponents of the damming of Tasmania against any opinion to the contrary, and were not averse to taking their opinions to statewide and national advertising campaigns asserting their right to dam the lake.

Reece was well known for his staunch support of the HEC and its renewable energy development schemes on the Gordon River, which earned him the epithet "Electric Eric". In 1972, Reece approved the flooding of Lake Pedder, which proceeded despite a determined protest movement and a blank cheque offer from his Labor colleague, Prime Minister Gough Whitlam, to preserve the Lake Pedder area. Reece refused Whitlam's offer, stating that he would "not have the federal government interfering with the sovereign rights of Tasmania". Reece retrospectively commented:

There was a National Park out there, but I can't remember exactly where it was ... at least, it wasn't of substantial significance in the scheme of things. The thing that was significant was that we had to double the output of power in this state in 10 years in order [to] supply the demands of industry and the community. And this was the scheme that looked as though it could do a greater part of [the] job for us.

— Eric Reece, Premier of Tasmania

=== Community response ===
Opposition to the flooding of Lake Pedder extended well beyond Tasmania and spread throughout Australia and internationally. The focus on the South West Tasmania Wilderness area as an environmental battleground increased interest in the area, and many travelled to Lake Pedder before it was flooded to see what the issues were about. In 1971, a large number of people travelled to Pedder to see the lake before it was to be inundated, and a particular weekend in March of that year became known as the Pedder Pilgrimage. Concerns over the construction of the dam revolved around the loss of the distinctive pink quartzite beach of the original lake, and an increased understanding of the unique nature of the wilderness quality to the south west of Tasmania.

The protests included the United Tasmania Group, which were the precursor to the Tasmanian Greens, recognised as the world's first green party. The group that preceded the Tasmanian Wilderness Society – the South West Tasmania Action Committee (itself preceded by the Lake Pedder Action Committee) - continued after the flooding, with the knowledge that surveying and appraising other catchments in the south west and west of Tasmania was well underway by the HEC. Although increasingly sophisticated economic, environmental, and engineering arguments were raised by the opponents of the dam, but until the Franklin scheme, neither the HEC nor its defenders even considered the critiques.

==== Alternative dam proposals ====
Protesters noted that instead of flooding the entire Serpentine Valley to the height of McPartlan Pass Canal (such that the waters could passively feed into Lake Gordon) - the Serpentine River could still be dammed but its waters raised to below that of Lake Pedder. This would lose the water flow from the Huon River catchment (only 12% of the total flow) and would require water to be pumped up to the Gordon Dam - but would preserve the original Lake Pedder and its surrounds. The HEC had already rejected this proposal as far back as 1966, for being too expensive.

==== Death of Brenda Hean ====
In September 1972, Christian activist Brenda Hean perished with pilot Max Price in a Tiger Moth aircraft they were flying from Tasmania to Canberra to protest the damming of Lake Pedder; allegedly, pro-dam campaigners had entered the plane's hangar and placed sugar in one of its fuel tanks.

==== Commonwealth enquiry and offer to drain lake ====
In 1972 Prime minister Gough Whitlam offered to pay for a Commonwealth enquiry into the Lake Pedder hydroelectric project, which some hoped would save the original lake. The flooding had caused national and international condemnation, including from Prince Philip, then president of the Australian Conservation Foundation. The interim report was released in June 1973 and recommended that the lake be drained and there be a 5-year moratorium on further flooding the lake and that the Tasmanian Government should be financially compensated in the interim. The environment minister Moss Cass presented the recommendations, along with extra costings by the Snowy Mountains Engineering Corporation, in October. The commonwealth originally declined to act, but changed its mind just over a week later after significant media attention, and put the offer to the Tasmanian Government. In response Reese said that he would not tolerate an "intrusion from Canberra or elsewhere", and there was no recommendation that the inquiry would make that would save the lake. The inquiry was completed in 1975, 2 years after the lake was inundated, and criticised the HECs dam building processes and recommended that there be a moratorium of development in South West Tasmania.

==== Other protests ====
Hesba Fay Brinsmead, an Australian children's author and environmentalist, wrote two books about the damming of Lake Pedder in the 1970s and 1980s.

Although the early environmental activists failed to save Lake Pedder, the raised awareness of the HEC's dam building in the Tasmanian wilderness was rechannelled into opposing the proposed Franklin Dam, which was successful.

=== Environmental impact ===
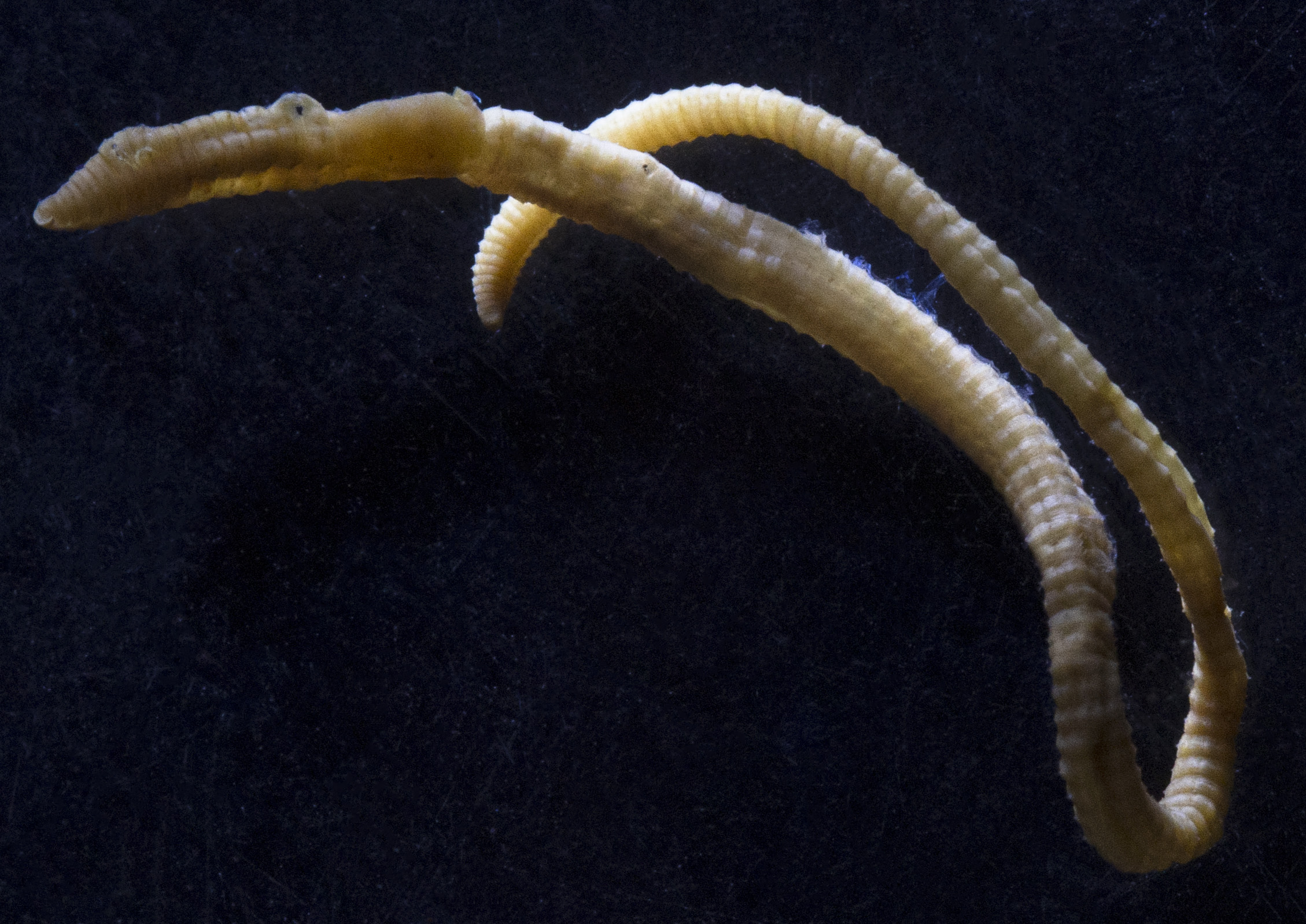
The only known specimen of the Lake Pedder earthworm (Hypolimnus pedderensis)

The Lake Pedder earthworm (Hypolimnus pedderensis) is only known by the type specimen collected from a beach on Lake Pedder, Tasmania, in 1971. After the flooding of the lake, the invertebrate has not been seen. A 1996 survey that sought to determine whether the species still existed in the area failed to find any examples. Since 2003, the Lake Pedder earthworm has been listed as extinct on the IUCN Red List of Threatened Species.

An extinction claimed to have occurred after the flooding is that of the Lake Pedder planarian (Romankenkius pedderensis), an endemic flatworm. Since 1996, this invertebrate was listed as extinct on the IUCN Red List of Threatened Species. In 2012, the continued existence of the species was reported.

In September 1973, 35,000 brown trout, an invasive species, were released into the new reservoir by the Department of Inland Fisheries since "fish tend to do well in new impoundments". This was against the protests of the Tasmanian Museum, universities and conservationists, as the release of a predatory and invasive species into a previously isolated body of water put endemic species at risk. This fear was bourne out, and scientists believe that predation by the brown trout is the main cause of the local extinction of the Pedder galaxias, a native freshwater fish, which used to be endemic to Lake Pedder and its tributaries. The Pedder galaxias still exists in captivity and in two translocated populations, one at Lake Oberon in the Western Arthurs mountain range and the other at a modified water-supply dam near Strathgordon.

=== Inundation ===
The Serpentine Dam was completed in November 1971, and Lake Pedder was inundated up to the dunes by April 1973. Scotts Peak Dam was completed in June 1973, further filling the reservoir.

A series of photographs in the 1976 Tasmanian Year Book illustrated the process of flooding of the Lake Pedder area.

== As a reservoir ==
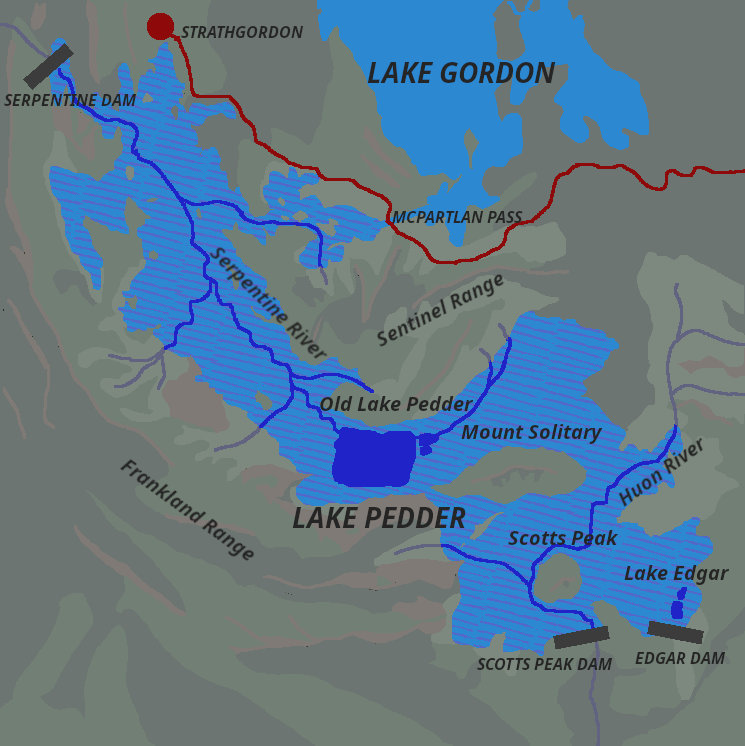
A superimposed map of the old and new Lake Pedder showing the water in the Serpentine Valley before and after the construction of the three dams

The Lake Pedder reservoir is impounded by three dams:

- Serpentine Dam – a 38-metre-high (125 ft) rock-fill embankment with a concrete upstream face on the Serpentine River
- Scotts Peak Dam – a 43-metre-high (141 ft) rock-fill embankment with a bitumen upstream face on the upper reaches of the Huon River near Scotts Peak
- Edgar Dam – a 17-metre-high (56 ft) saddle embankment at Lake Edgar near Scotts Peak

Its waters fill the Serpentine valley and cover 24,133 hectares (59,630 acres), making it the second-largest lake in Tasmania, and the combined Pedder-Gordon impoundment the largest water storage in Australia. Lake Pedder itself has no hydroelectric generation capacity, but is instead connected to Lake Gordon via the McPartlan Pass Canal, (Note: The canal is located at 42°50′51″S 146°11′45″E.) and provides around 40% of the water used by the Gordon Power Station. As a result, although the lake is 14m deep only the top 1.5m is used. This was considered desirable for aesthetic reasons, as it means there's never large sections of exposed mud flats. Additionally, trees that would have died from the inundation were cleared to make the lake more picturesque from common viewing points.

Lake Pedder Reservoir 1975 with mist

As only the top 1.5m of the impoundment is usable, it functions primarily as a means to divert the flow of the Huon and Serpentine rivers into Lake Gordon, and can only store 350GL of usable water. Lake Gordon, in contrast holds 12,350GL. There is a diversion tunnel under the Serpentine Dam to be used in case of flooding, and a riparian outlet in the Scotts Peak Dam to maintain some flow down the Huon river, along with an emergency spillway on the Gordon Dam.

A 1995 enquiry found that the Pedder reservoir contributed 65MW (570GWh per year) of electricity to the grid. A 2019 consultancy report estimated that water from the Pedder reservoir contributed to about 5.7% of Tasmania's electricity demand in the previous year, or approximately 624GWh. In 2022 The Restore Lake Pedder Campaign found that over the last decade the waters of Lake Pedder contributed 57MW on average (500GWh per year), a figure also stated by the Greens in 2024.

During the 2016 Tasmanian energy crisis, Hydro Tasmania considered drawing down Lake Pedder, but it was considered impractical.

=== Recreation ===
The Lake Pedder reservoir has been a popular brown trout fishing location since 1972, when the area was flooded and fish introduced. Immediately after damming, the average fish size was almost 5 kg, a common phenomenon for artificial reservoirs as the rotting plant matter provides an excellent food source. Between 1975 and 1983 it was a world class trophy fishing location, popular with interstate and overseas visitors. A 1981 news article reports a 10.4 kg trout was caught in the new lake. However, in the years since as the reservoir matured the fish sizes stabilised to 1 kg, and angling activity declined, though it is still well regarded.

In the 2015-2016 financial year 25,710 interstate and international visitors went to Lake Pedder, comparable to the 28,100 who visited from 2002 to 2003, making up 4.3% of visitors to Tasmania.

Although the official name of the reservoir is Lake Pedder, activists and academics sometimes refer to it as the Huon–Serpentine Impoundment, after the two major dammed rivers, and some bushwalkers informally refer to it as "Fake Pedder".

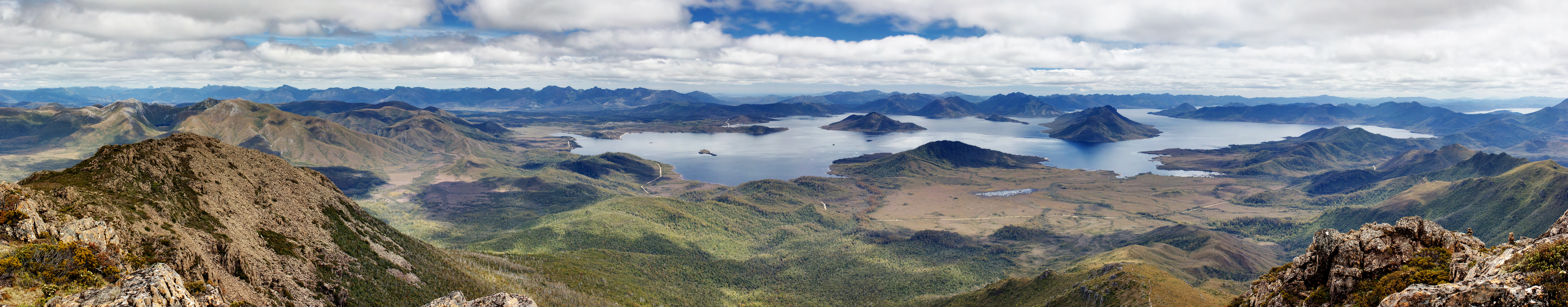
Panoramic view of the Lake Pedder reservoir from Mount Eliza, Southwest National Park, Tasmania, Australia

== World Heritage Area ==
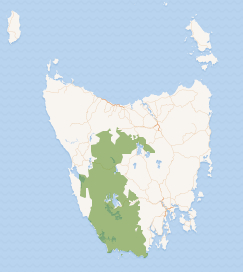
The Tasmanian Wilderness World Heritage Area covers the SW portion of the state. Lake Gordon is excluded (coloured blue) but Lake Pedder is included (coloured dark green).

The Gordon-Pedder impoundment was originally planned as just stage 1 of a more extensive damming of the south west, and as early as 1972 the HEC was investigating the possibility of dams on the lower Gordon at Butler Island, the Olga River, the King River and the Franklin River. In 1978, the HEC announced plans to dam the Franklin, setting off massive protests.

In 1982, during the Franklin Dam protests, South West Tasmania was listed as a world heritage site, the Tasmanian Wilderness World Heritage Area, due to its "outstanding value to humanity". This listing ultimately gave the federal government the ability to block the Franklin Dam over the protests of the Tasmanian government.

The world heritage area excluded the adjacent Lake Gordon reservoir due to its large drawdown, which leaves "desolate" areas below the high water, but included Lake Pedder as its stable water level makes it more scenic, and because of the potential "long term restoration of the original lake".

== Restoration campaigns ==
Calls to restore Lake Pedder began immediately after it was first inundated, with the federal government offering the Tasmanian government millions to temporarily drain the lake and reassess.

In the early 1990s, studies revealed that the original quartzite beach and dune system was preserved under the water, covered only in a very thin layer of silt, and could be restored if the Lake Pedder reservoir was drained. This was again confirmed in 2020.

=== Pedder 2000 (1994-2000) ===
In 1994 the IUCN urged the Tasmanian State Government and Australian Federal Government to investigate restoring Lake Pedder, as its flooding was an "environmental disaster which severely affected the integrity of the Tasmanian World Heritage Site".

The same year a campaign group was launched called Pedder 2000. They proposed draining and restoring the lake to its original state. It received widespread support, including from Liberal MP Tony Abbott, who stated that the original lake was "an internationally recognised environmental treasure" and draining it "may be good politics as well as good sense",, as well as from environmentalists David Suzuki, David Bellamy and Prince Philip.

Although a parliamentary inquiry found it was technically feasible and would increase the site's World Heritage value, it also found that it was not compelled to drain the lake under international law, the project would be costly, and it was unlikely to succeed given it was not supported by either major Tasmanian political party. However, it also stated that it was "unlikely that such a project [like the original damming of Lake Pedder]... would now be approved" and that since the original Lake Pedder was well preserved under the reservoir the decision could be made to drain it in the future as public opinion changed.

=== Restore Lake Pedder (2019-) ===
To coincide with the United Nations Decade of Ecological Restoration, covering 2021–2030, the Lake Pedder Restoration Committee called, in 2019, to have the lake restored to its original state. The committee, convened by Christine Milne with support from Todd Dudley, Bob Brown, Paul Thomas, and Tabatha Badger, planned to have an ecological management plan to restore the original Lake Pedder and surrounding iconic ecosystems.

The plan was supported by organisations including the Wilderness Society and The Greens, but opposed by the Tasmanian energy minister Guy Barnett who stated "In Tasmania, we want to move forward and grow our renewable energy credentials, not go backwards".

The restoration campaign faced a setback in 2024 when the federal government approved strengthening works on the Edgar Dam (found to be on an active fault line) without a full environmental impact report or considering draining the reservoir.

== Climate ==
Lake Pedder has an oceanic climate (Köppen: Cfb).

Climate data for Lake Pedder (Scotts Peak Dam) (1992–2022)
Month	Jan	Feb	Mar	Apr	May	Jun	Jul	Aug	Sep	Oct	Nov	Dec	Year
Record high °C (°F)	38.6 (101.5)	35.9 (96.6)	37.5 (99.5)	29.1 (84.4)	22.0 (71.6)	15.7 (60.3)	17.1 (62.8)	22.5 (72.5)	25.2 (77.4)	30.6 (87.1)	34.8 (94.6)	36.3 (97.3)	38.6 (101.5)
Mean daily maximum °C (°F)	21.2 (70.2)	21.2 (70.2)	18.6 (65.5)	14.9 (58.8)	11.6 (52.9)	9.8 (49.6)	9.3 (48.7)	10.4 (50.7)	12.4 (54.3)	14.9 (58.8)	17.8 (64.0)	19.0 (66.2)	15.1 (59.2)
Mean daily minimum °C (°F)	9.5 (49.1)	9.4 (48.9)	8.5 (47.3)	6.9 (44.4)	5.5 (41.9)	4.0 (39.2)	3.3 (37.9)	3.4 (38.1)	4.3 (39.7)	5.2 (41.4)	6.9 (44.4)	8.0 (46.4)	6.2 (43.2)
Record low °C (°F)	2.6 (36.7)	3.3 (37.9)	1.3 (34.3)	−0.4 (31.3)	−1.1 (30.0)	−1 (30)	−2.3 (27.9)	−2.1 (28.2)	−1.6 (29.1)	−1 (30)	−0.5 (31.1)	1.5 (34.7)	−2.3 (27.9)
Average precipitation mm (inches)	95.2 (3.75)	81.9 (3.22)	120.4 (4.74)	132.6 (5.22)	191.6 (7.54)	181.4 (7.14)	211.9 (8.34)	229.7 (9.04)	210.8 (8.30)	165.8 (6.53)	111.2 (4.38)	143.2 (5.64)	1,927.8 (75.90)
Average precipitation days (≥ 0.2 mm)	17.4	15.8	19.3	21.8	25.8	25.8	27.1	26.4	25.5	24.5	19.7	20.2	269.3
Average afternoon relative humidity (%)	58	59	66	74	82	86	85	81	76	69	62	63	72
Source: Bureau of Meteorology

== Gallery - Original Lake Pedder ==
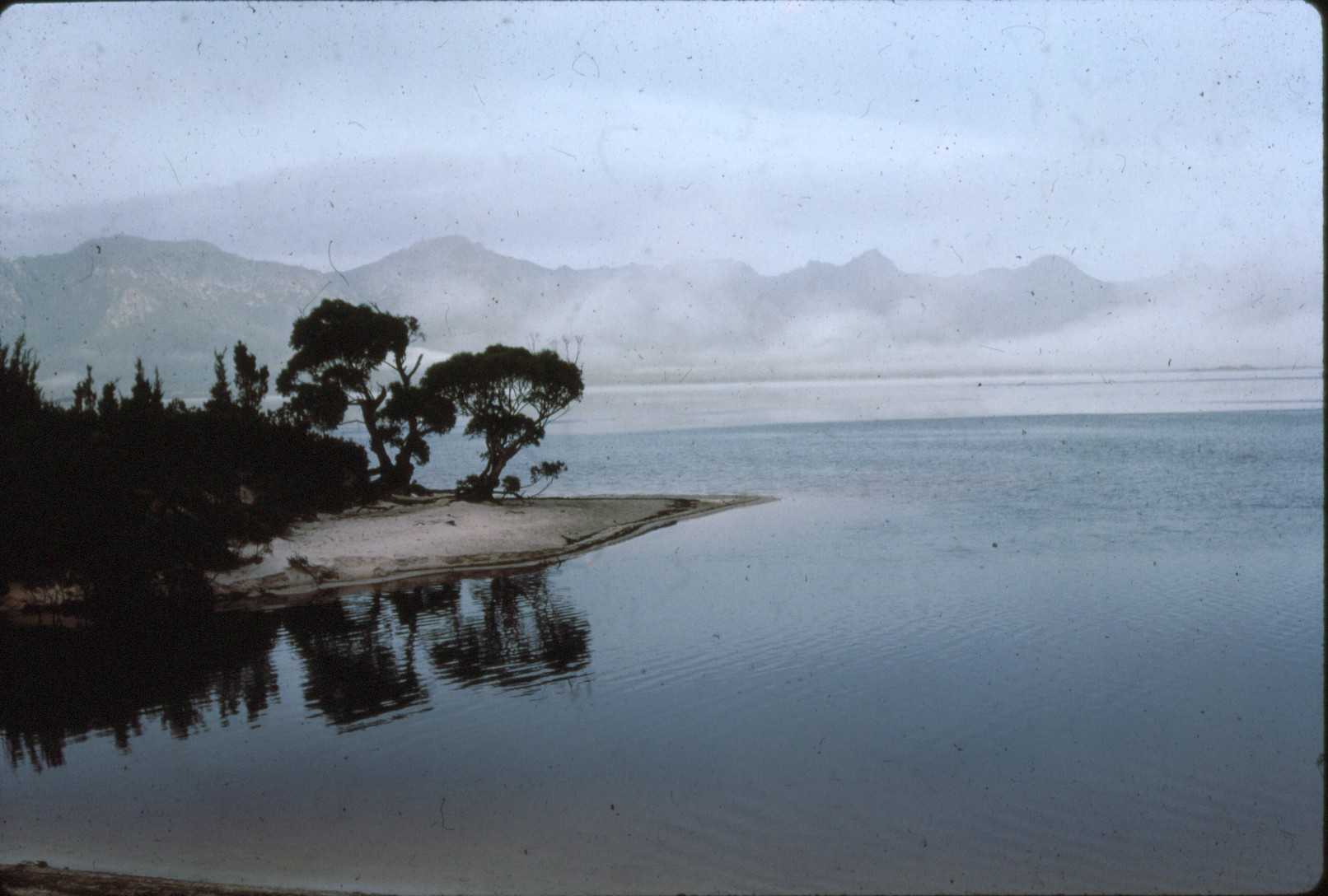
Shores of Lake Pedder, c. 1970.

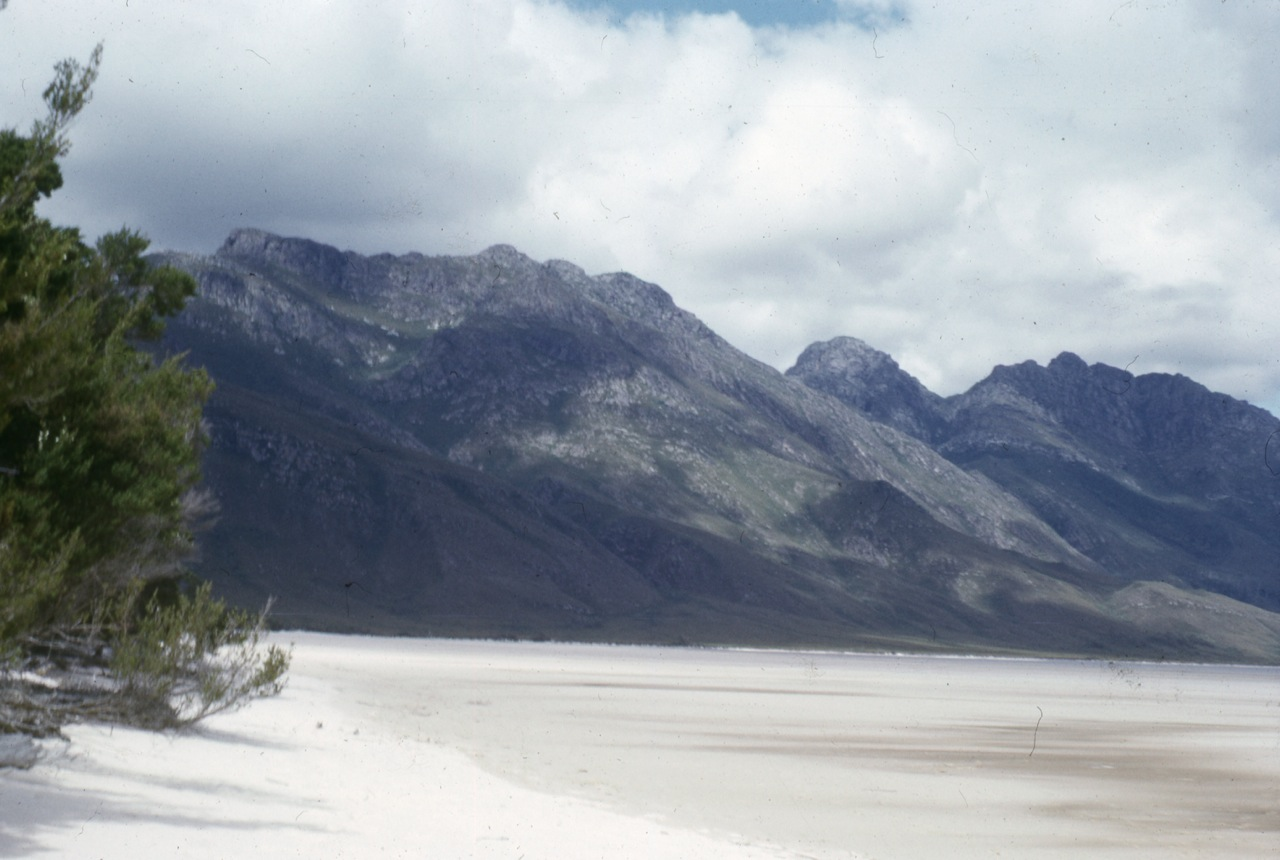
Lake Pedder Beach, March 1966.

Lake Pedder in 1954

A small plane coming into land c. 1968 - 1972.

Light planes on Lake Pedder beach in front of the Frankland Ranges c. 1963

== Gallery - Lake Pedder Reservoir ==
Lake Pedder in 1975

Lake Pedder in 2014

From Mount Sprent Looking SE across Lake Pedder

== See also ==
- List of reservoirs and dams in Australia § Tasmania
- List of lakes of Australia § Tasmania
- Olegas (opera)
- The South West Book
