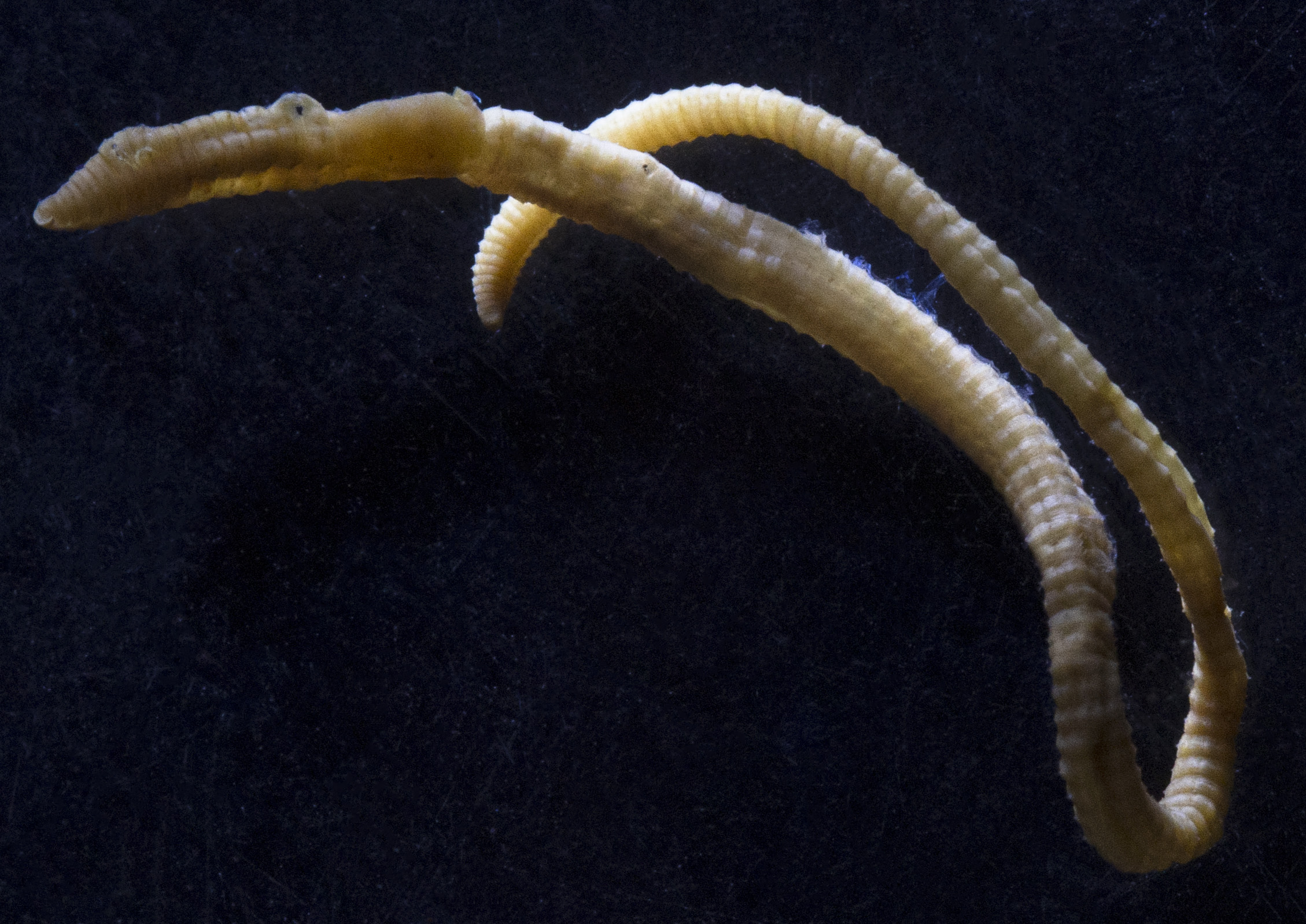
- Holotype specimen collected in February 1971, the only known specimen of this species in existence, photographed at Museum of Tasmania Collections and Research Facility

Conservation status
- Extinct (1972) (IUCN 3.1)

Scientific classification
- Kingdom: Animalia
- Phylum: Annelida
- Clade: Pleistoannelida
- Clade: Sedentaria
- Class: Clitellata
- Order: Opisthopora
- Family: Megascolecidae
- Genus: †Hypolimnus; Blakenmore, 2000
- Species: †H. pedderensis

Binomial name
- †Hypolimnus pedderensis (Jamieson, 1974)

Synonyms
- Atlantodrilus pedderensis (nomen nudum); Diporochaeta pedderensis (Jamieson, 1974); Perionychella pedderensis Jamieson, 1974

= Lake Pedder earthworm =

Earthworm species

The Lake Pedder earthworm (Hypolimnus pedderensis) is an extinct earthworm species in the family Megascolecidae. Its genus Hypolimnus is monotypic.

It was endemic to the Lake Pedder area in Tasmania, Australia, prior to its flooding in 1972 for a hydroelectric power scheme. It is only known from the holotype specimen collected from a Lake Pedder beach in 1971. A 1996 survey failed to find it, and it is presumed extinct.

Lake Pedder earthworms mainly fed on microbes or algae on sand particles. Their feeding habits were seen to have a considerable impact on the banks of the lake, as the particles they consumed were deposited on the surface of the ground in the form of castings. As these castings were exposed to air, the soil was aerated, improving both the drainage and water-holding capacity of the soil.
