= Serpentine River (Tasmania) =

River in Tasmania, Australia

Serpentine
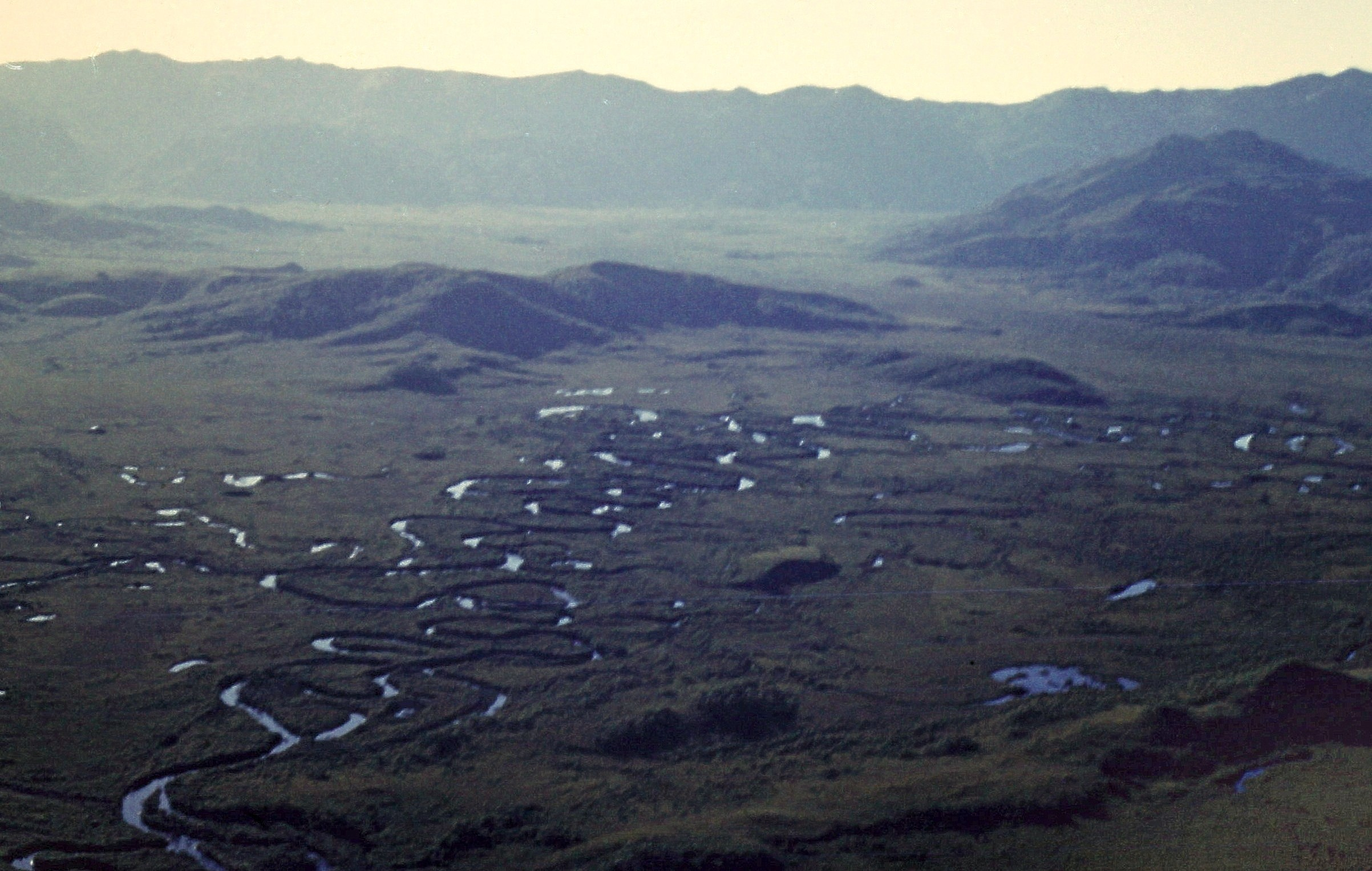
- The upper reaches of the Serpentine River from Detached Peak - pre 1972

- Location of the Serpentine River mouth in Tasmania

Location
- Country: Australia
- State: Tasmania
- Region: South-west, Western

Physical characteristics
- Source: Wilmont Range
  - location: Lake Pedder
  - coordinates: 42°56′S 146°7′E
  - elevation: 313 m (1,027 ft)
- Mouth: Gordon River
  - location: Gordon Splits
  - coordinates: 42°44′53″S 145°57′39″E
  - elevation: 122 m (400 ft)
- Length: 26 km (16 mi)

Basin features
- River system: Gordon-Franklin catchment
- Reservoir: Lake Pedder

The Serpentine River is a major perennial river in the south-west and western regions of Tasmania, Australia.

== Course and features ==
The Serpentine River is almost entirely inundated by the current Lake Pedder. Before its flooding the river rose at the northwestern corner of the original Lake Pedder and drained the eastern slopes of the Frankland and Wilmot ranges. It flows generally north by northwest, joined by one minor tributary. The river is impounded by the Serpentine Dam, one of three dams that create Lake Pedder, and then flows towards the Gordon Splits where it reaches its confluence with the Gordon River.

== See also ==
- List of rivers of Australia § Tasmania
