= Fault scarp =

Small vertical offset on the ground surface

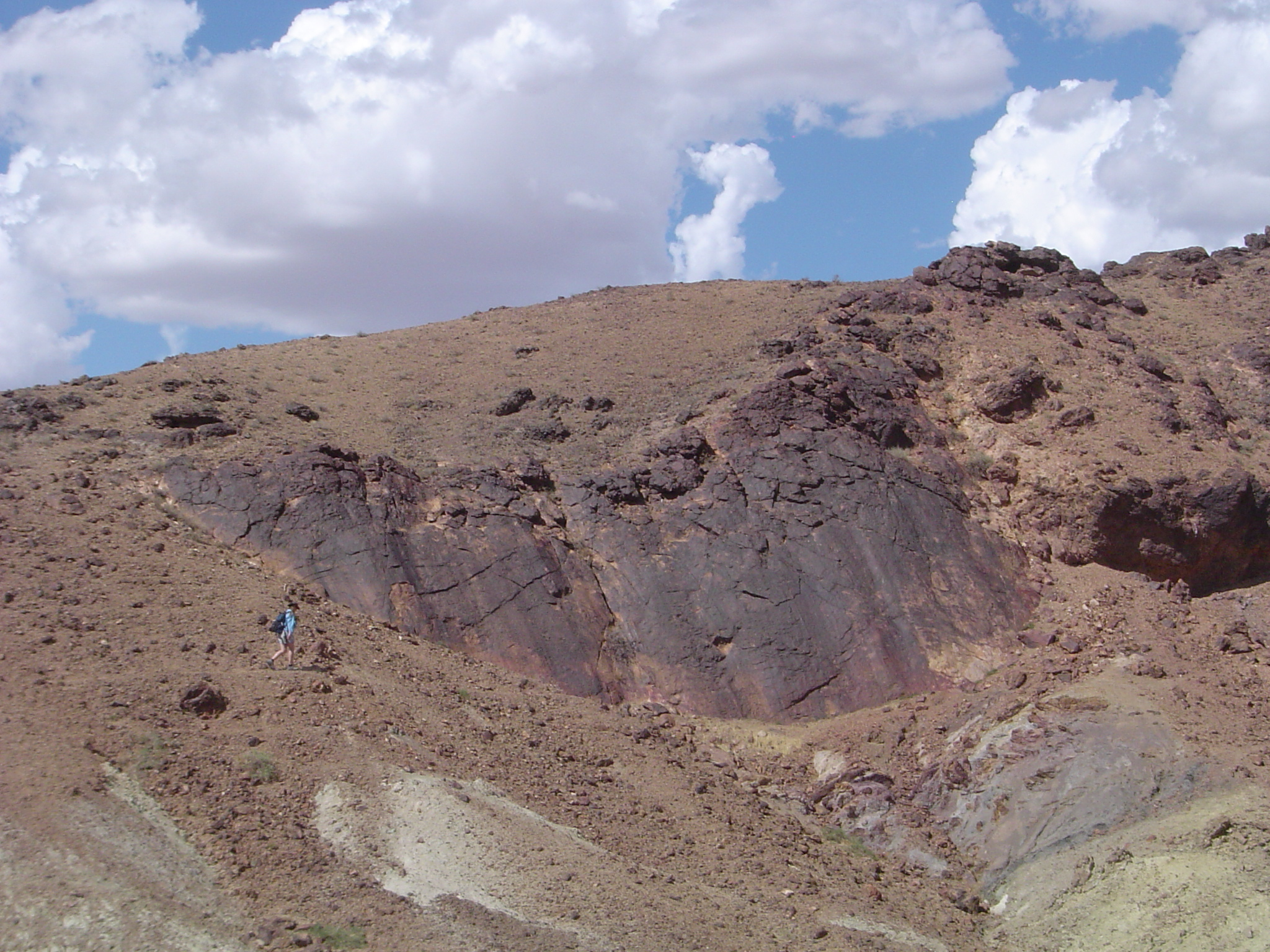
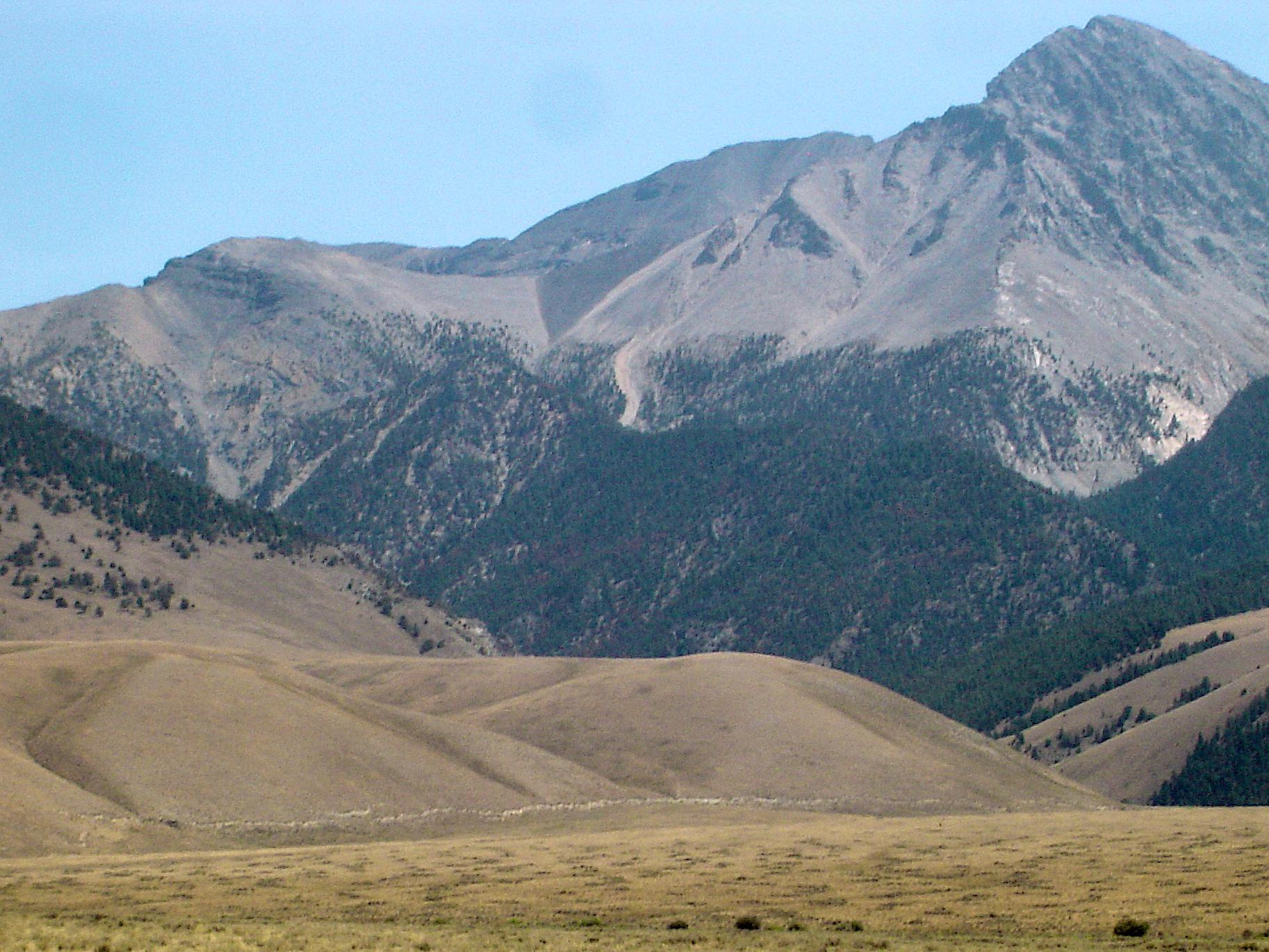
An eroded fault scarp from the Gobi Desert of Mongolia (left) and at Borah Peak in Idaho. The latter fault scarp (white line at the base of the tan hills) was formed in the 1983 Borah Peak earthquake

A fault scarp is a small step-like offset of the ground surface in which one side of a fault has shifted vertically in relation to the other. The topographic expression of fault scarps results from the differential erosion of rocks of contrasting resistance and the displacement of land surface by movement along the fault. Differential movement and erosion may occur either along older inactive geologic faults, or recent active faults.

== Characteristics ==
Fault scarps often involve zones of highly fractured rock and discontinuities of hard and weak consistencies of rock. Bluffs can form from upthrown blocks and can be very steep, as in the case of Pakistan's coastal cliffs. The height of the scarp formation tends to be defined in terms of the vertical displacement along the fault. Active scarp faults may reflect rapid tectonic displacement and can be caused by any type of fault including strike-slip faults. Vertical displacement of ten meters may occur in fault scarps in volcanic bedrock, but is usually the result of multiple episodic movements of 5 to 10 meters per tectonic event.

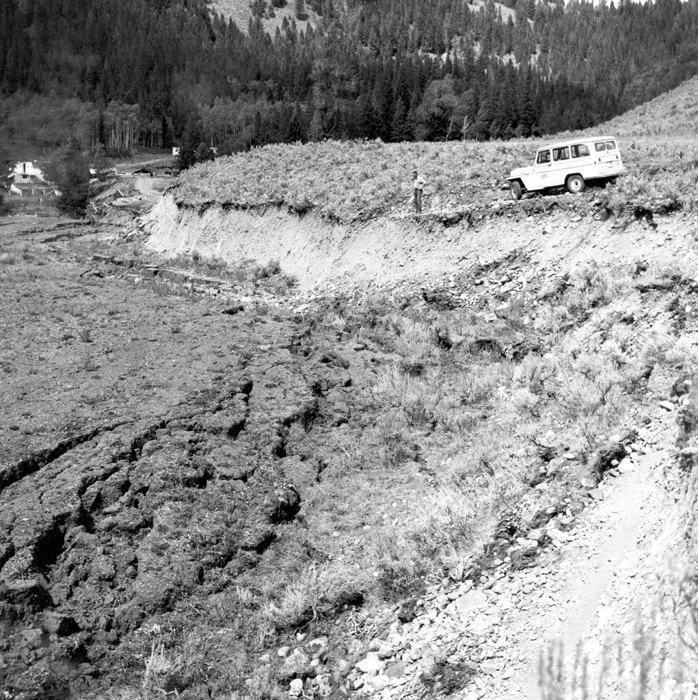
This fault scarp was created by the 1959 Hebgen Lake earthquake. The photo was taken August 19, 1959.

The dramatic uplift along the fault, which exposes its surface, causes the fault scarp to be very prone to erosion. This is especially true if the material being uplifted consists of unconsolidated sediment. Weathering, mass wasting, and water runoff can soon wear down these bluffs and sometimes result in V-shaped valleys along runoff channels. Adjacent V-shaped valley formations give the remaining fault spurs a very triangular shape. This formation is known as a triangular facet; however, this landform is not limited to fault scarps.

Fault scarps may vary in size from a few centimeters to many meters. Fault-line scarps are typically formed due to the differential erosion of weaker rocks along a fault. Such erosion, occurring over long time periods, may shift a physical cliff far from the actual fault location, which may be buried beneath a talus, an alluvial fan, or filled-in valley sediments. It may therefore be difficult to distinguish between fault scarps and fault-line scarps.

== Examples ==
- The Teton Range, in Wyoming, is an example of an active fault scarp. The dramatic topography of the Tetons is caused by geologically-recent activity on the Teton Fault.
- Fault scarps in Motosu, Japan, were created by the 1891 Mino–Owari earthquake.
- The fault scarps bounding the East African Rift Valley.
- The fault scarps bounding the Rio Grande Rift, in New Mexico.
- The fault scarp on the eastern side of Lake Singkarak.
- The Bree fault scarp of the Roer Valley in northeast Belgium
- The underwater Malta escarpment marks the eastern end of the Malta Plateau continental shelf and runs southwards from the eastern coasts from Sicily and the Malta towards the Medina Seamounts near the African coast.
