= South West Tasmania =

- Region
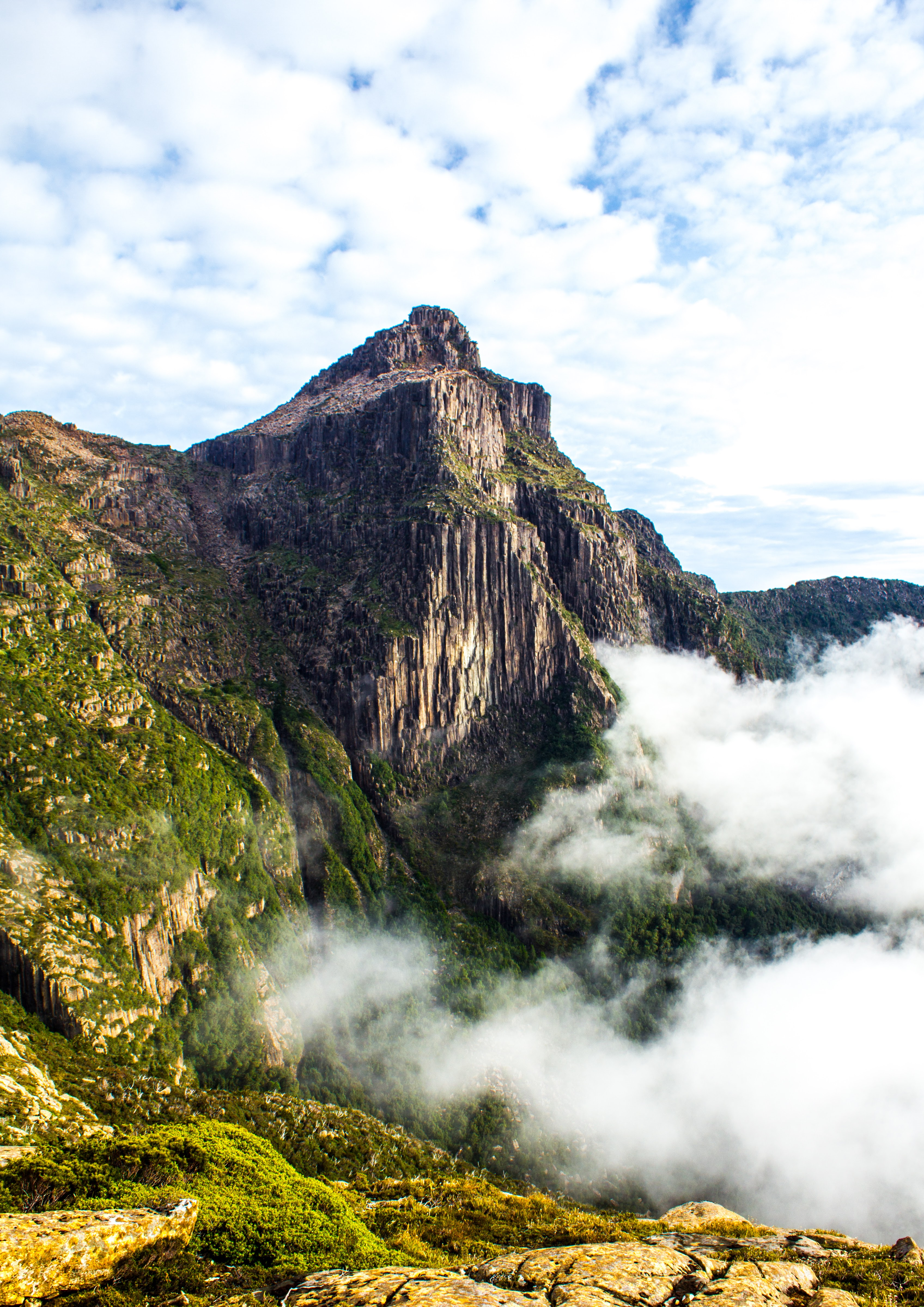
- Mount Anne is the tallest mountain in south-west Tasmania, at 1,423 m (4,669 ft) AMSL.
- Country: Australia
- State: Tasmania
- LGAs: Derwent Valley; Huon Valley

Government
  - State electorate: Lyons, Franklin
  - Federal division: Lyons, Franklin

Population
  - Total: 15
Regions around South West Tasmania
Southern Ocean	North West Tasmania	Central Highlands
Southern Ocean	South West Tasmania	Southern Tasmania
Southern Ocean	Southern Ocean	Southern Ocean

South West Tasmania is a region in Tasmania that has evoked curiosity and wonder during the period of European presence on the island.

Initially relatively unexplored by Europeans, in the mid-twentieth century the area was considered for its potential resources for development. Much of the area is now protected within the Southwest National Park and as part of the Tasmanian Wilderness World Heritage Area.

The most notable controversy occurring in the region was the flooding of Lake Pedder as part of a hydro-electric development, in 1972. This was followed, further north, by the proposed damming of the Franklin River in the early 1980s, which did not proceed.

Southwest is a locality that covers most of the region. The locality (and therefore the region) is in the local government areas of Derwent Valley (29%), Huon Valley (20%), Central Highlands (7%) and West Coast (44%). Its central point, near the encircled locality of Strathgordon, is about 116 kilometres (72 mi) west of the town of New Norfolk, the administrative centre for the Derwent Valley Council. The 2016 census has a population of 15 for the state suburb of Southwest.

== Early surveys ==
Most early walks through the region were for discovery, or in the case of Thomas Bather Moore was to establish tracks for access.

In 1927, a walk through the area between Cox Bight and Bathurst Harbour even included the then governor of the state, Sir James O'Grady, and its intention was a search for geological information.

== Locality boundaries ==
The Southern Ocean forms the western and southern boundaries. The locality encircles Strathgordon, and is adjoined by the localities of Macquarie Heads, Strahan, West Coast, Queenstown, Gormanston, Lake St Clair, Derwent Bridge, Butlers Gorge, Tarraleah, Wayatinah, Florentine, Maydena, Styx, Lonnavale, Geeveston, Raminea, Strathblane, Hastings, Lune River, and Recherche.

== Road infrastructure ==
The A10 route (Lyell Highway) enters from Derwent Bridge in the north-east and runs generally north-west until it reaches the north-western boundary, where it exits to Queenstown. Route B61 (Gordon River Road) enters from Maydena in the east and runs generally west through Strathgordon to the Gordon Dam, where it ends. Route C607 (Scotts Peak Dam Road) starts at an intersection with B61 and runs south and west to Scotts Peak Dam, where it ends.

== South West Advisory Committee ==
Members were Sir George B Cartland, G. J. Foot and A. G. Ogilvie. Submissions were received on its subject area. It made a preliminary report in May 1976, and a final report in August 1978.

== South West Tasmania Resources Survey ==
Following national and international concern over the fate of South West Tasmania, Commonwealth Government funded the survey with the States Grants (Nature Conservation Act) Act of 1974. Further funding was provided from the Environment (Financial Assistance) Act of 1977.

The South West Tasmania Resources Survey produced 25 Discussion Papers, 22 Working Papers and 20 Occasional papers - including the breakup of the region into river catchments:

- Franklin River
- Picton River
- Huon Weld
- Lake Gordon–Lake Pedder
- Lower Gordon
- Macquarie Harbour
- King River
- Mackintosh-Murchison
- Wanderer and Giblin
- Davey River
- Bathurst Harbour
- New River and South Coast

== National inventory ==
Ten years after the South West Resources survey the Australia Heritage Commission published an inventory for the South West.

== See also ==
- South West Wilderness
- Regions of Tasmania
- Melaleuca
