= Great Australian Bight (disambiguation) =

Great Australian Bight is a bay occupying part of the southern coast of the Australian continent within the states of South Australia and Western Australia.

Great Australian Bight may also refer to:

== Marine protected areas and associated arrangements ==
- Great Australian Bight Commonwealth Marine Reserve, the former name of the Great Australian Bight Marine Park (2017)
- Great Australian Bight Marine National Park, a national park in force since 1996
- Great Australian Bight Marine Park, the collective name used for Great Australian Bight Marine National Park, Great Australian Bight Marine Park Whale Sanctuary and the Great Australian Bight Commonwealth Marine Reserve.
- Great Australian Bight Marine Park (2017), a marine protected area renamed as a marine park in 2017
- Great Australian Bight Marine Park (Commonwealth waters), a former protected area
- Great Australian Bight Marine Park Whale Sanctuary, an aquatic reserve in force since 1995

== Biogeographic region ==
- Great Australian Bight Shelf Transition, a region listed in the Integrated Marine and Coastal Regionalisation of Australia
