= The Wilderness Society (Australia) =

Non profit environmental advocacy group

- Founded: 1976, Nipaluna, Hobart, Tasmania, Australia
- Purpose: Environmentalism, Peace
- Location: Nipaluna, Hobart, Tasmania, Australia
- Region served: Australia
- Method: Nonviolence, Lobbying, Research, Innovation
- Website: www.wilderness.org.au

The Wilderness Society is an Australian, community-based, not-for-profit non-governmental environmental advocacy organisation.

The society is organized as a public company limited by guarantee. It has separately incorporated campaign centres, passed in the capital of each Australian state (plus Launceston and Newcastle). Most campaign centres are separately incorporated and operate as membership organizations: The Wilderness Society Newcastle Incorporated, The Wilderness Society (South Australia) Inc, The Wilderness Society (Tasmania) Inc, The Wilderness Society Victoria Inc, and The Wilderness Society WA Inc.

== History ==
The first TWS Journal, 1976, which included an article by a "Dr Robert Brown" describing rafting the Franklin River early that year

The Wilderness Society was formed initially as the Tasmanian Wilderness Society (TWS) and was transition from the South West Tasmania Action Committee.

Former logo

The group was originally established in 1976 from the members of the Lake Pedder Action Committee and the South West Tasmania Action Committee Along with the United Tasmania Group, they had protested against the earlier flooding of Lake Pedder. The group already had established interstate branches as the South West Tasmania Action Committee (in NSW branch the word "Action" was not included), so it was already a nationwide organisation. Significantly, all but four of the twenty-three people attending the inaugural meeting of the Tasmanian Wilderness Society in 1976 were members of the United Tasmania Group.

The campaign to save the Franklin River took seven years, 1976-83. The Tasmanian Wilderness Society played a key role. On 1 July 1981, works were stopped on the Franklin Dam when the High Court ruled that, in upholding the World Heritage Convention, Labor Prime Minister Bob Hawke’s government could overrule Tasmanian premier Robin Gray. Following the success of the campaign against the Franklin Dam, and the national approach being more important due to other issues interstate, it became known as The Wilderness Society.

In the year 2005, Tasmanian forestry business Gunns brought a litigation case against the group in the Melbourne Supreme Court, in a case dubbed the "Gunns 20", claiming that the activities of environmental activists had damaged Gunns' profits. Gunns claimed $3.5 million from the Wilderness Society, but in March 2009, Gunns was ordered to pay the Wilderness Society $350,000 in damages and to cease the action.

== Campaigns ==
The Wilderness Society spent considerable energy in its first decades of existence arguing that wilderness was a specific quality in parts of Australia's environment that was vital to preserve for future generations. The political response in most states of Australia is that there are now wilderness inventories and acknowledgement of areas of wilderness.

The Wilderness Society's campaigns have included:

- the Franklin river (Franklin Dam controversy)
- stopping logging in old growth forests
- preventing destruction of endangered species habitats;
- protecting Queensland's Wild Rivers and Cape York Peninsula;
- nationwide campaign to mitigate the effects of climate change keep fossil fuels in the ground;
- the Kimberley Campaign; as part of its long-running campaign against a proposal to industrialise the James Price Point headland near Broome, the organisation presented a concert on 5 October 2012. The concert featured performances from The John Butler Trio, Clare Bowditch and Missy Higgins, and a speech by the former leader of the Australian Greens and former TWS director, Dr Bob Brown.
- since 2018 they have been focused on New Nature Laws - campaigning for strong, national nature laws and an independent watchdog agency to enforce these
- protecting the Great Australian Bight from fossil fuel exploration and extraction, with four major oil companies abandoning plans to drill for oil in the Bight, Equinor being the latest to do so in 2020
- On 4 May 2022, the NSW government ruled out a third coal lease site on the doorstep of Wollemi National Park. It came after tens of thousands of people signed submissions and wrote to MPs. It took a sustained effort from Wiradjuri Traditional Owners, the local community, the Wilderness Society and others
- helping see an end to native forest logging in Victoria, which the Andrews government announced would start from 1 January 2024. It was the culmination of a decades-long campaign with other environmental groups and local communities
- helping to protect the rivers and floodplains of the Channel Country in Queensland from fossil fuel expansion in 2023

=== Stance on nuclear energy ===
The Wilderness Society opposes nuclear energy.

== Funding ==
Traditionally fundraising was performed through The Wilderness Society Shops. The shops were particularly popular for their calendars and posters by photographers such as Peter Dombrovskis and Olegas Truchanas, and were also central locations for the public to make donations and for members to meet.

Since the rise of the internet, fundraising has increasingly become centralised around internet based activities, such as the TWS website, online store and extensive email lists, although it also still contacts supporters through regular postal communications as well.

The Wilderness Society now raises funds through a number of sources, mainly donations, including advocacy gifts and gifts in wills (bequests), subscriptions from members, grants, sales of merchandise, and interest and other investment income.

In 2021 the Wilderness Society reported receiving $869,000 in COVID-19 relief subsidies.

== Political involvement ==
The inaugural director of The Wilderness Society was Kevin Kiernan, followed by Norm Sanders, who was later elected to the seat of Denison in the Tasmanian Parliament in 1980 for the Australian Democrats. He was Australia's first parliamentarian to be elected on an environmental platform. Bob Brown became the director of The Wilderness Society in 1978, and with him the group increased their influence on Tasmanian politics. Brown was elected to the Tasmanian parliament in 1983 to fill the vacancy left when Sanders resigned his seat, and with the group of fellow conservationists elected subsequently, he went on to become part of the political party known as the Tasmanian Greens. Brown was later elected to represent Tasmania and the Greens in the Senate in the Federal parliament.

While The Wilderness Society has worked with the Australian Greens on certain campaigns, it is not affiliated with them or any other political party, as a politically unaligned environmental non-government organisation.

== Wilderness Journal ==
The society publishes the Wilderness Journal, which covers a wide variety of stories about nature and people. Topics include the communities and forests of East Gippsland, a photo diary by Ben Baker of a road trip through bushfire damaged regions, a story about Marina DeBris and the ugly beauty of our trash, attempts to restore the giant kelp forests of Tasmania, and a journey into Mirning country, the coast and waters of the Great Australian Bight.
