= Great Australian Bight Marine Park Whale Sanctuary =

Protected area in South Australia

- IUCN category Ia (strict nature reserve)
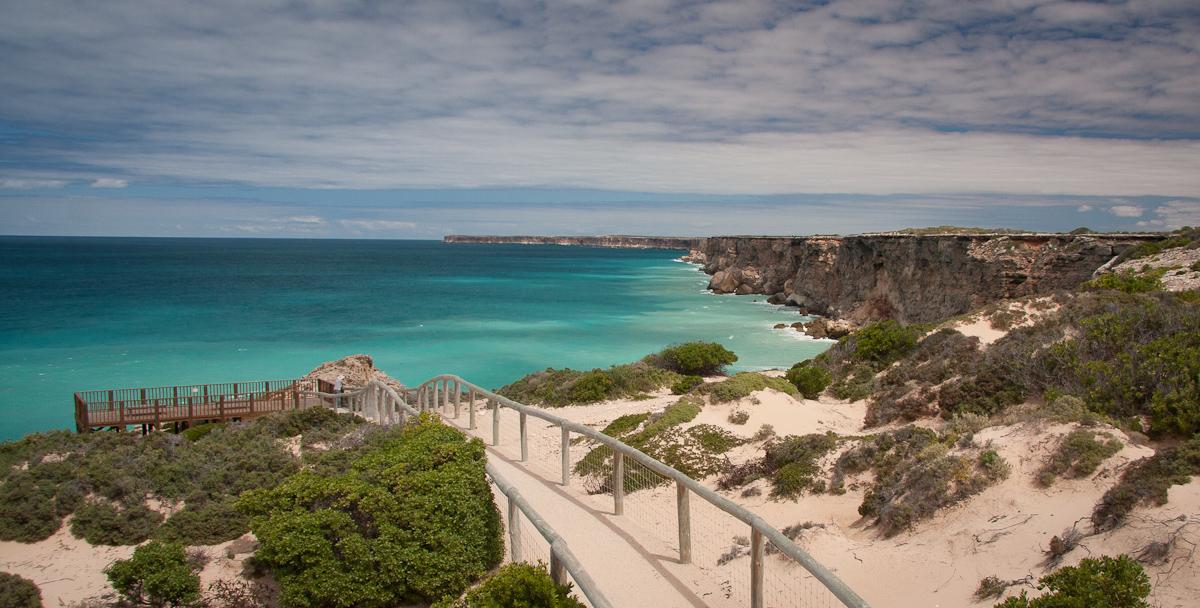
- Viewing platform at the Head of the Bight

- Location within South Australia
- Location: South Australia
- Nearest city: Fowlers Bay
- Coordinates: 31°29′36″S 131°09′30.9″E
- Area: 435.87 km^{2} (168.29 sq mi)
- Established: 22 June 1995
- Governing body: Department of Environment, Water and Natural Resources (2016)

Great Australian Bight Marine Park Whale Sanctuary was a marine protected area in the Australian state of South Australia located immediately off the coastline of the Great Australian Bight in waters about 790 km (491 mi) west-northwest of the state capital of Adelaide.

It extended from 130 degrees 45.5 minutes east at its western boundary to 131 degrees 30 minutes east at its eastern boundary, and from the coastline for a distance of 3 nautical miles (5.6 km; 3.5 mi). It was bounded by the Great Australian Bight Marine National Park to its immediate west and east and its extent included the bay known as the Head of Bight. It was also part of the group of marine protected areas which are located together in waters within Australian and South Australian jurisdictions within the Great Australian Bight and which is collectively known as the Great Australian Bight Marine Park. Since late 2012, both the whale sanctuary and the national park have also been within the boundaries of the Far West Coast Marine Park.

The whale sanctuary was originally proclaimed as a marine park under the Fisheries Act 1982 (SA) by the South Australian Government on 22 June 1995 to protect waters used by Southern right whales for breeding and calving. It was re-classified as an aquatic reserve after the repeal of the Fisheries Act 1982 by the Fisheries Management Act 2007 (SA) in 2007. It was abolished on 20 October 2016.

The whale sanctuary was classified as an IUCN Category Ia protected area.

== See also ==
- Great Australian Bight Marine Park (2017)
- Great Australian Bight Marine Park (Commonwealth waters)
- Whale watching in Australia
