= Geoff Holloway =

Tasmanian poet, conservationist, and sociologist

- Occupations: Poet, sociologist, conservationist, political activist
- Organization: United Tasmania Group

Geoff Holloway is an Australian sociologist, author, poet, conservationist and political activist.

He is a sociologist, as well as activist within the United Tasmania Group in its earlier iteration, and later.

He was one of the individuals present at the meeting that adopted the change of name, while retaining the same focuses, of the South West Tasmania Action Committee to the Tasmanian Wilderness Society in 1976.

He is also author of works about conservation and environment groups in Tasmania.

As UTG secretary from 2018 up until 2020, he also has expressed views that reflect upon earlier environmental issues, such as the Lake Pedder issue with the Mount Wellington Cable Car, Ecotourism, other articles in The UTG Journal.

== Selected works ==
- Holloway, Geoffrey Mitchell (1977), Poems (1st ed.), Piglet Publications], ISBN 978-0-9595923-0-6
- Holloway, Geoffrey Mitchell (1978), Cold as ice (1st ed.), Piglet Publications, ISBN 978-0-9595923-2-0
- Holloway, Geoffrey Mitchell (1978), Poems 2 (1st ed.), Piglet Publications, ISBN 978-0-9595923-1-3
- Holloway, Geoffrey Mitchell (1979), Imaginary friends, Piglet Publications, ISBN 978-0-9595923-5-1
