= Results of the 1976 Tasmanian state election =

Tasmanian state election, 11 December 1976 House of Assembly << 1972–1979 >>
Enrolled voters	258,550				
Votes cast	244,424		Turnout	94.54	–0.37
Informal votes	9,294		Informal	3.80	+0.14
Summary of votes by party
Party	Primary votes	%	Swing	Seats	Change
Labor	123,386	52.48	–2.45	18	– 3
Liberal	104,613	44.49	+6.12	17	+ 3
United Tasmania Group	5,183	2.20	–1.70	0	± 0
Workers Party	524	0.22	+0.22	0	± 0
Socialist Workers Party	123	0.05	+0.05	0	± 0
Independent	1,424	0.61	–2.19	0	± 0
Total	235,130			35	

This is a list of House of Assembly results for the 1976 Tasmanian election.

== Results by division ==
=== Bass ===
1976 Tasmanian state election: Bass
Party	Candidate	Votes	%	±%
Quota		5,431		
Liberal	Bill Beattie (elected 4)	3,824	8.8	−6.8
Liberal	Jim Mooney (elected 7)	3,000	6.9	+6.9
Liberal	Max Bushby (elected 5)	2,948	6.8	+1.1
Liberal	Neil Robson (elected 6)	2,870	6.6	+6.6
Liberal	Dawn Rhodes	2,109	4.9	+4.9
Liberal	Neil Pitt	2,068	4.8	−4.9
Liberal	Dick Archer	1,964	4.5	+4.5
Liberal	John Beswick	1,931	4.4	+4.4
Liberal	William Luck	646	1.5	+1.5
Labor	Michael Barnard (elected 1)	8,401	19.3	+0.6
Labor	Gill James (elected 3)	3,943	9.1	+9.1
Labor	Harry Holgate (elected 2)	3,471	8.0	+3.6
Labor	David Farquhar	1,533	3.5	−0.7
Labor	Ursula Workman	1,373	3.6	+3.6
Labor	Thomas O'Byrne	1,193	2.7	+2.7
Labor	John Breen	869	2.0	+2.0
Labor	Myron Tripp	397	0.9	+0.9
United Tasmania	Bob Brown	414	1.0	+1.0
United Tasmania	Deidre Smith	255	0.6	+0.6
United Tasmania	Noreen Batchelor	95	0.2	+0.2
Independent	Quentin Wilson	143	0.3	+0.3
Total formal votes		43,447	95.8	−0.2
Informal votes		1,886	4.2	+0.2
Turnout		45,333	94.3	−0.5
Party total votes
Liberal		21,360	49.2	+6.3
Labor		21,180	48.7	−0.6
United Tasmania		764	1.8	−0.2
Independent	Quentin Wilson	143	0.3	+0.3

=== Braddon ===
1976 Tasmanian state election: Braddon
Party	Candidate	Votes	%	±%
Quota		6,247		
Labor	Glen Davies (elected 1)	7,953	15.9	+9.3
Labor	John Coughlan (elected 3)	5,057	10.1	+7.8
Labor	Geoff Chisholm (elected 4)	4,090	8.2	+3.3
Labor	Michael Field (elected 5)	3,565	7.1	+7.1
Labor	Ted Vickers	2,837	5.7	+5.7
Labor	Maurice Dart	1,443	2.9	+2.9
Labor	Graeme Smith	1,053	2.1	+2.1
Labor	Christopher Wright	924	1.8	+1.8
Liberal	Ray Bonney (elected 2)	6,438	12.9	+1.7
Liberal	Ron Cornish (elected 6)	4,000	8.0	+8.0
Liberal	Roger Groom (elected 7)	3,334	6.7	+6.7
Liberal	Eric Bessell	2,777	5.6	+5.6
Liberal	Kent Furmage	2,138	4.3	+4.3
Liberal	Frank Atkins	1,831	3.7	+3.7
Liberal	Harold Hawkes	1,439	2.9	+2.9
Liberal	Harold Dowling	963	1.9	+1.9
Independent	Philip Kelly	128	0.3	+0.3
Total formal votes		49,970	96.6	−0.2
Informal votes		1,766	3.4	+0.2
Turnout		51,736	94.3	−0.2
Party total votes
Labor		26,922	53.9	−9.0
Liberal		22,920	45.9	+12.1
Independent	Philip Kelly	128	0.3	+0.3

=== Denison ===
1976 Tasmanian state election: Denison
Party	Candidate	Votes	%	±%
Quota		5,854		
Liberal	Max Bingham (elected 1)	14,521	31.0	+7.1
Liberal	Hank Petrusma	1,777	3.8	+2.0
Liberal	Bob Baker (elected 6)	1,466	3.1	−0.7
Liberal	Robert Mather (elected 5)	1,305	2.8	−1.8
Liberal	David Brownlow	1,297	2.8	+2.8
Liberal	Rudge Townley	839	1.8	+1.8
Liberal	Max Robinson (elected 7)	474	1.0	+1.0
Liberal	Basil Giffard	230	0.5	+0.5
Labor	Neil Batt (elected 2)	8,639	18.4	+9.7
Labor	Julian Amos (elected 3)	3,167	6.8	+6.8
Labor	John Green (elected 4)	2,668	5.7	−4.5
Labor	Ian Cole	1,887	4.0	+0.4
Labor	Margaret Thurstans	1,831	3.9	+3.9
Labor	Thomas Gascoigne	1,316	2.8	+2.8
Labor	Des Lavey	1,269	2.7	+2.7
Labor	Ken Austin	1,132	2.4	−6.2
United Tasmania	Rod Broadby	1,525	3.3	+3.3
United Tasmania	Helen Gee	352	0.8	+0.8
United Tasmania	Patricia Armstrong	290	0.6	+0.6
United Tasmania	Patricia Jones	265	0.6	+0.6
United Tasmania	William Hickson	96	0.2	+0.2
United Tasmania	Kevin Hazelwood	73	0.2	+0.2
United Tasmania	David Stephen	64	0.1	+0.1
Workers	Lance Buckingham	199	0.4	+0.4
Workers	Peter Mollon	26	0.1	+0.1
Socialist Workers	Rosanne Fidler	72	0.2	+0.2
Socialist Workers	John Tully	51	0.1	+0.1
Total formal votes		46,831	96.2	0.0
Informal votes		1,828	3.8	0.0
Turnout		48,659	93.0	−1.3
Party total votes
Liberal		21,909	46.8	+6.8
Labor		21,909	46.8	+0.5
United Tasmania		2,665	5.7	−1.2
Workers		225	0.5	+0.5
Socialist Workers		123	0.3	+0.3

=== Franklin ===
1976 Tasmanian state election: Franklin
Party	Candidate	Votes	%	±%
Quota		5,913		
Labor	Bill Neilson (elected 1)	11,373	24.0	+6.9
Labor	Doug Lowe (elected 2)	6,944	14.7	+4.1
Labor	Ray Sherry (elected 4)	3,676	7.8	+7.8
Labor	Eric Barnard (elected 5)	2,891	6.1	−13.0
Labor	Jack Frost	1,291	2.7	−2.2
Labor	Bill McKinnon	656	1.4	+1.4
Labor	Peter Brown	645	1.4	+1.4
Labor	Raymond Woodruff	528	1.1	+1.1
Labor	Barrie Robinson	98	0.2	+0.2
Liberal	John Beattie (elected 3)	6,077	12.8	+3.4
Liberal	Geoff Pearsall (elected 6)	3,976	8.4	+3.5
Liberal	Steve Gilmour (elected 7)	2,516	5.3	+5.3
Liberal	Alan Duggan	1,735	3.7	+1.1
Liberal	Doug Clark	1,604	3.4	−5.2
Liberal	Thomas Dempsey	510	1.1	+1.1
Liberal	Roy Pallett	473	1.0	+1.0
Liberal	Frank O'Connor	103	0.2	+0.2
United Tasmania	Ria Ikin	562	1.2	+1.2
United Tasmania	John Levett	222	0.5	+0.5
United Tasmania	Brian Chapman	148	0.3	+0.3
United Tasmania	Rosemary Brown	145	0.3	+0.3
United Tasmania	Michael Davies	89	0.2	+0.2
United Tasmania	Judith Walker	89	0.2	+0.2
United Tasmania	Sharyn Harrison-Williams	44	0.1	+0.1
Independent	Leo Jarvis	334	0.7	+0.7
Independent	Bryan Threlfall	327	0.7	+0.7
Independent	Harry Priest	125	0.3	+0.3
Independent	Roger Francis	119	0.3	+0.3
Total formal votes		47,300	96.2	0.0
Informal votes		1,868	3.8	0.0
Turnout		49,168	95.3	0.0
Party total votes
Labor		28,102	59.4	+0.7
Liberal		16,994	35.9	+2.6
United Tasmania		1,299	2.7	−5.3
Independent	Leo Jarvis	334	0.7	+0.7
Independent	Bryan Threlfall	327	0.7	+0.7
Independent	Harry Priest	125	0.3	+0.3
Independent	Roger Francis	119	0.3	+0.3

=== Wilmot ===
1976 Tasmanian state election: Wilmot
Party	Candidate	Votes	%	±%
Quota		5,948		
Labor	Michael Polley (elected 1)	8,055	16.9	+5.7
Labor	Darrel Baldock (elected 2)	6,265	13.2	+6.0
Labor	Andrew Lohrey (elected 4)	3,704	7.8	−2.2
Labor	Charles Batt	3,094	6.5	+0.4
Labor	Gordon Edhouse	1,573	3.3	+3.3
Labor	Terry Aulich (elected 5)	1,483	3.1	+3.1
Labor	Graham Vertigan	578	1.2	+1.2
Labor	Allan Rhodes	521	1.0	+1.0
Liberal	Robin Gray (elected 3)	4,632	9.7	+9.7
Liberal	Ian Braid (elected 6)	3,891	8.2	+1.8
Liberal	Graeme Page (elected 7)	2,694	5.7	+5.7
Liberal	Trevor Roach	2,231	4.7	+4.7
Liberal	Bob Ingamells	2,207	4.6	−0.6
Liberal	D L Youd	1,971	4.1	+4.1
Liberal	Jim Burn	1,649	3.5	+3.5
Liberal	Bert Bessell	1,306	2.7	−1.7
Liberal	Clyde FitzGerald	1,029	2.2	+2.2
United Tasmania	Anthony Burke	343	0.7	+0.7
United Tasmania	Anthony Joyce	63	0.1	+0.1
United Tasmania	Roy Jackson	49	0.1	+0.1
Workers	Stewart Lester	253	0.5	+0.5
Workers	Kevin Chaffey	46	0.1	+0.1
Independent	Stan King	125	0.3	+0.3
Total formal votes		47,582	96.1	−0.3
Informal votes		1,946	3.9	+0.3
Turnout		49,528	95.7	0.0
Party total votes
Labor		25,273	53.1	−3.9
Liberal		21,430	45.0	+2.9
United Tasmania		455	1.0	+1.0
Workers		299	0.6	+0.6
Independent	Stan King	125	0.3	+0.3

== See also ==
- 1976 Tasmanian state election
- Members of the Tasmanian House of Assembly, 1976–1979
- Candidates of the 1976 Tasmanian state election
