= Western Eyre Marine Park =

Marine protected area in the Great Australian Bight, off South Australia

- Interactive map of Western Eyre Marine Park
- Location: Australia
- Nearest city: Streaky Bay, South Australia
- Coordinates: 34.2169°S 134.3605°E
- Area: 57,946 km^{2} (22,373 sq mi)
- Established: 8 December 2012
- Governing body: Director of National Parks
- Website: Official website

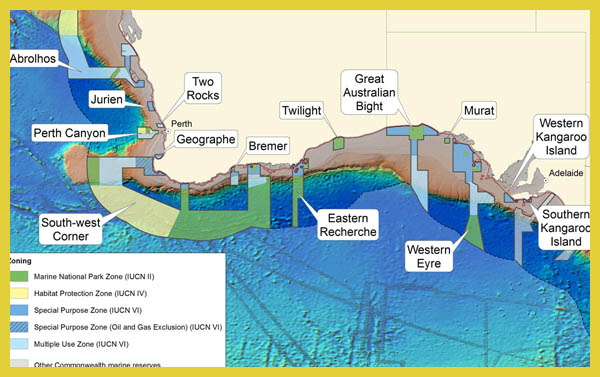
South-West Commonwealth marine reserves

Western Eyre Marine Park (formerly Western Eyre Commonwealth Marine Reserve) is a marine protected area located in the Great Australian Bight south of South Australia in waters within the Australian Exclusive economic zone.

It was gazetted in November 2012.

The marine park consists of three zones - a marine national park zone (IUCN Category II) which occupies three separate areas of ocean with a total area of 17,439 square kilometres (6,733 square miles), a multiple use zone (IUCN Category VI) with an area of 16,107 square kilometres (6,219 square miles) and a special purpose zone (IUCN Category VI) with an area of 24,400 square kilometres (9,400 square miles).

It is part of the group of Australian marine parks known as the South-West Marine Park Network.

It lies east of the Great Australian Bight Marine Park.

== See also ==
- Protected areas managed by the Australian government
