= Coastal stingaree =

Conservation status
- Endangered (IUCN 3.1)

Scientific classification
- Kingdom: Animalia
- Phylum: Chordata
- Class: Chondrichthyes
- Subclass: Elasmobranchii
- Order: Myliobatiformes
- Family: Urolophidae
- Genus: Urolophus
- Species: U. orarius

Binomial name
- Urolophus orarius Last & M. F. Gomon, 1987

Species of cartilaginous fish

The coastal stingaree (Urolophus orarius) is an uncommon species of round ray in the stingaree family, Urolophidae, that is endemic to the eastern Great Australian Bight.

== Appearance and anatomy ==
As with more common rays, the body of this species is flat and disc-shaped, with pectoral fins that broadly expand and are in a fixed relationship with the head and trunk. Characteristic of the stingaree family, the coastal stingaree's body is circular and disc-like. As with other rays, it has a long, particularly slender tail that is distinctly separate from the body. Most species of stingaree have one or more venomous spines approximately halfway down their tail. In addition to this defensive, venomous sting, most stingarees have obscure coloration, which acts as camouflage. The coastal stingaree is greyish-brown with dark mottling on its upper surface and paler underneath which allow it to blend with the sandy or rocky bottom.

== Distribution and ecology ==
The coastal stingaree is restricted to the Eastern Indian Ocean in the waters of southern Australia. There, the species is known to reside from the Great Australian Bight Marine Park to the waters of western Victoria. The coastal stingaree is a marine, bottom-dweller found in shallow coastal waters. It inhabits depths of 20–50 metres (66–164 ft).

Very little is known about the biology of the coastal stingaree due to its sparse and elusive population. they appear to behave similarly to other stingaree species. The coastal stingaree often feeds on bottom-dwelling fishes, shrimp, sea worms and other small organisms. There is also evidence that the coastal stingaree is also able to eat hard-shelled molluscs and crustaceans.

== Conservation ==
The coastal stingaree is not explicitly targeted by fisheries or used commercially. However, large numbers of the species are still caught as bycatch by these fisheries. The stingarees have low birth rates and slow reproductive turnover. Because of this and their restricted habitat and range, the coastal stingaree is particularly susceptible to the dangers of over-fishing.

The coastal stingaree occurs within the Great Australian Bight Marine Park. Thus, this part of their territory exists within the Benthic Protection Zone (BPZ) which gives the species a degree of protection. The park's mission is not only to maintain biodiversity in the area, but also to provide ecologically sustainable use of marine resources. However, fisheries and recreational fishing are still permitted to operate in parts of the park and BPZ. Exploration and drilling for petroleum has continued since 2003. These activities may yet threaten the coastal stingaree population.

As of 2010, no conservation measures focus on the coastal stingaree.
