= Kevin Kiernan =

Kevin Kiernan may refer to: -

- Kevin Kiernan (scholar), American scholar of Anglo-Saxon literature
- Kevin Kiernan (geomorphologist), Australian writer, geomorphologist, and conservationist
