= List of fatal shark attacks in Australia =

This is a list of fatal shark attacks in Australia. The Australian Shark-Incident Database includes 312 fatal shark attacks between 1791 and October 2026. Since 2000 there have been 59 confirmed fatal shark attacks in Australia, including 24 incidents since 2020.

The list below includes incidents that have not yet been confirmed by the Australian Shark Incident Database.

== 2020s ==
Date	Time	State	Area	Site category	Species	Activity	Victim	Sex	Age	Injury	Reference	UIN
2026-09-18	10:15	WA	Sorrento - Sorrento Beach	Coastal - surf beach	White	Swimming	Greg O'Neill	Male	63	Body not recovered		1306
2026-06-06	11:20	WA	Albany - Michaelmas Island	Island - beach	White	Spearfishing	Daniel Turpin	Male	35			1303
2026-05-24	12:00	Qld	Great Barrier Reef - Hull HeadsKennedy Shoal	Coastal - Reef	Bull	Spearfishing	Michael Jensz	Male	39	Head wound		1302
2026-05-16	10:00	WA	Rottnest Island - Horseshoe Reef	Island - open ocean reef	White	Spearfishing	Steven Mattaboni	Male	38	Major lacerations - lower legs		1301
2026-01-18	16:20	NSW	Sydney Harbour - Vaucluse - Nielsen Park - Shark Beach	Estuary - bay	Bull	Swimming; Jumping off rocks	Nicolas (Nico) Antic	Male	12	Major lacerations - legs		1295
2025-11-27	06:30	NSW	Crowdy Bay - Kylies Beach	Coastal - surf beach	Bull	Swimming	Livia Mulheim	Female	25	Major lacerations		1293
2025-09-06	10:00	NSW	Sydney - Long Reef Beach	Coastal - surf beach	White	Surfing	Mercury Psillakis	Male	57	Leg and arm severed		1289
2025-03-10	12:10	WA	Esperance - Wharton Beach	Coastal - surf beach	White	Surfing	Steven Payne	Male	37	Body not recovered		1278
2025-02-03	16:45	Qld	Moreton Bay - Bribie Island - Woorim Beach	Coastal - surf beach	Bull	Swimming	Charlize Zmuda	Female	17	Injuries to upper body		1272
2025-01-02	19:00	SA	Australian Bight - Granites Beach	Coastal - surf beach	White	Surfing	Lance Appleby	Male	26	Body not recovered		1270
2024-12-28	16:37	Qld	Keppel Bay - Humpy Island	Island - open ocean		Spearfishing	Luke Walford	Male	40	Major laceration - neck		1269
2023-12-28	13:30	SA	Spencer Gulf - Yorke Peninsula - Ethel Beach	Coastal - surf beach	White	Surfing	Khai Cowley	Male	15	Leg bitten off		1250
2023-10-31	10:20	SA	Australian Bight - Streaky Bay	Coastal - surf beach	White	Surfing	Tod Gendle	Male	55	Body not recovered		1241
2023-05-13		SA	Australian Bight - Eyre Peninsula - Walkers Rocks	Coastal - surf beach	White	Surfing	Simon Baccanello	Male	46	Remains not recovered		1232
2023-02-04	15:00	WA	Swan River - N Fremantle	River	Bull	Swimming after jumping off jet ski	Stella Berry	Female	16	Major lacerations - leg		1224
2022-02-16	16:35	NSW	Little Bay Beach, Sydney	Coastal - bay to open ocean	White	Swimming	Simon Nellist	Male	35	Consumed		1203
2022-11-06	10:00	WA	Fremantle - Port Beach	Coastal	White	Swimming	Paul Millachip	Male	57	Bitten in half		1194
2021-09-05	11:45	NSW	Coffs Harbour - Emerald Beach	Coastal - surf beach	White	Surfing	Timothy Thompson	Male	31	Multiple injuries		1190
2021-05-18	11:00	NSW	Forster - Tuncurry Beach	Coastal - surf beach	White	Surfing	Mark Sanguinetti	Male	59	Leg injury		1182
2021-01-21	17:00	SA	Australian Bight - Eyre Peninsula - Walkers Rocks	Coastal - surf beach	White	Snorkeling	Duncan Craw	Male	32	Major lacerations		1169
2020-11-22	08:45	WA	Broome - Cable Beach	Coastal	Bull	Surfing	Charles Cernobori	Male	55	Bites to arm and thigh		1164
2020-10-09	16:00	WA	Esperance - Wylie Bay	Coastal - bay to open ocean	White	Surfing	Andrew Sharpe	Male	52	Body not recovered		1159
2020-09-08	17:00	Qld	Gold Coast - Greenmount Beach	Coastal	White	Surfing	Nick Slater	Male	46	Leg injuries		1155
2020-07-11	14:30	NSW	Northern Rivers - Wooli Beach	Coastal - surf beach	White	Surfing	Mani Hart-Deville	Male	15	Legs injured		1150
2020-07-04	14:00	Qld	Fraser Island - Indian Head	Coastal - open ocean	Whaler	Spearfishing	Matthew Tratt	Male	36	Lacerations - leg, foot		1148
2020-06-07	10:00	NSW	Kingscliff - Casuarina Beach	Coastal - ocean beach	White	Surfing	Rob Pedretti	Male	60	Thigh bitten		1143
2020-04-06		Qld	North West Island	island - open ocean reef		Swimming	Zachary Robba	Male	23	Injuries to arm, leg, torso		1138
2020-01-05	13:00	WA	Esperance - Cull Island	Island - open ocean	White	Diving	Gary Johnson	Male	57	Right arm severed, body not recovered		1132

== 2010s ==
Date	Time	State	Area	Site category	Species	Activity	Victim	Sex	Age	Injury	Reference	UIN
2018-11-05	17:30	Qld	Whitsunday Islands - Cid Harbour	Coastal		Swimming	Daniel Christidis	Male	33	lacerations - leg, arm		1097
2017-04-17	16:00	WA	Esperance - Wylie Bay	Coastal - bay to open ocean	White	Surfing	Laeticia Brouwer	Female	17	Leg ripped off		1065
2016-06-05	Late morning	WA	Perth - Mindarie - One Mile Reef	Pelagic - reef	White	Diving	Doreen Collyer	Female	60	3 limbs removed		1036
2016-05-31	Dusk	WA	Mandurah - Gearies Beach	Coastal - surf beach	White	Surfing	Ben Gerring	Male	29	Leg removed		1034
2016-02-16		Qld	Kennedy Shoal		White	Diving	Steven Foster	Male	54	Body not recovered		
2015-07-25	07:00	Tas	Lachlan Point - Maria Island	Coastal - bay to open ocean	White	Diving	Damian Johnson	Male	46	Major lacerations - torso, pelvic region		1008
2015-02-09	09:55	NSW	Ballina - Shelly Beach	Coastal - surf beach	White	Surfing	Tadashi Nakahara	Male	41	Legs severed		996
2014-12-30	12:20	WA	Cheynes Beach	Coastal - beach to open ocean	White	Spearfishing	Jay Muscat	Male	17	Multiple injuries		988
2014-12-15	11:30	Qld	Port Douglas - Rudder Reef	Island open ocean - reef	Tiger	Spearfishing	Daniel Smith	Male	18	Major lacerations - arm, thigh		989
2014-09-09	10:40	NSW	Byron Bay - Clarkes Beach	Coastal - surf beach	White	Snorkelling	Paul Wilcox	Male	50	Major lacerations - thigh		978
2014-04-03	08:50	NSW	South Coast - Tathra Beach	Coastal	White	Swimming	Christine Armstrong	Female	63	Remains not recovered		969
2014-02-08	12:00	SA	Gulf St Vincent - Yorke Peninsula - Goldsmith Beach	Coastal	White	Spearfishing with bait fish	Sam Kellett	Male	28	Remains not recovered		965
2013-11-30	14:00	NSW	Coffs - Campbells Beach	Coastal	Tiger	Surfing, in an area with whales present	Zac Young	Male	19	Major lacerations - arm, torso, leg		962
2013-11-23	09:00	WA	Gracetown - Umbies Break	Coastal - surf beach	White	Surfing, in an area with dolphins and baitfish present	Chris Boyd	Male	35	Major lacerations - leg		961
2012-07-14	09:05	WA	Wedge Island	Coastal - surf beach	White	Surfing	Ben Linden	Male	24	Remains not recovered		944
2012-03-31	09:30	WA	Bunbury - Stratham Beach	Coastal - ocean beach	White	Diving	Peter Kurmann	Male	33			936
2011-10-22	13:25	WA	Rottnest Island - Little Armstrong Bay	Coastal - surf beach	White	Diving	George Wainwright	Male	32	Major lacerations - torso		922
2011-10-09	08:10	WA	Perth - Cottesloe Beach	Coastal - surf beach	White	Swimming	Bryn Martin	Male	64	Eaten whole		920
2011-09-04	13:26	WA	Dunsborough - Bunker Bay - The Boneyards	Coastal - surf beach	White	Surfing, in an area with dolphins and seals present	Kyle James Burden	Male	21	Major lacerations - leg		919
2011-08-29	19:30	Qld	Palm Island - Challenger Bay	Island open ocean	Tiger	Swimming	'Rooster'	Male	48	Major lacerations - torso		918
2011-02-17	18:20	SA	Australian Bight - Coffin Bay - Perforated Island	Island open ocean	Whites - 2	Diving, in an area with other sharks present	Peter Clarkson	Male	49	Remains not recovered		912
2010-08-17	08:05	WA	Gracetown - Cowaramup Bay - South Point Beach	Coastal - surf beach	White	Surfing, in an area with seals	Nicholas Edwards	Male	31	Leg severed		907

== 2000s ==
Date	Time	State	Area	Site category	Species	Activity	Victim	Sex	Age	Injury	Reference	UIN
2008-12-27	07:00	WA	Rockingham - Port Kennedy Beach	Coastal - surf beach	White	Snorkeling	Brian Guest	Male	51	Remains not recovered		868
2008-04-08	08:05	NSW	Ballina - Lighthouse Beach	Coastal - surf beach	Bull	Surfing	Peter Edmonds	Male	16	Major lacerations - thigh, calf		860
2006-01-07	17:15	Qld	North Stradbroke Island - Amity Point	Coastal - surf beach	Bull	Swimming	Sarah Whiley	Female	21	Major lacerations - leg, hand		828
2005-08-24	16:10	SA	Gulf St Vincent - Adelaide - Glenelg Beach	Coastal - ocean beach	White	Diving	Jarrod Stehbens	Male	23	Major laceration - torso		819
2005-03-19	14:00	WA	Houtman Abrolhos - Pelsaert Island - Wreck Point	Island open ocean	White	Snorkeling	Geoffrey Brazier	Male	26	Major laceration - torso		815
2004-12-16	15:15	SA	Gulf St Vincent - Adelaide - West Beach	Coastal - beach to open ocean	White - 2	Surfing	Nick Peterson	Male	18	Fully consumed		811
2004-12-11	13:00	Qld	Port Douglas - Opal Reef	Pelagic - reef	Tiger	Spearfishing	Mark Thompson	Male	38	Major laceration - thigh		810
2004-07-10	14:10	WA	Gracetown - Lefthanders near Margaret River	Coastal - surf beach	White - 2	Surfing	Bradley Smith	Male	30	Eaten whole		804
2003-02-08	Morning	Qld	Gold Coast	River	Bull	Swimming, in an area with Pinnipeds present	Bob Purcell	Male	84	Major lacerations - leg		779
2002-12-16	02:30	Qld	Lake Heron, Miami Lakes	River	Bull	Swimming	Beau Martin	Male	23	Major lacerations - torso, leg		775
2002-04-30	12:40	SA	Australian Bight - Smoky Bay - near Saddle Point	Coastal	White	Diving for scallops	Paul Buckland	Male	23	Major lacerations - leg		770
2000-11-06	06:30	WA	Perth - Cottesloe Beach	Coastal - surf beach	White	Swimming, in an area with a seal present	Ken Crew	Male	49	Torso attacked		749
2000-09-25	13:00	SA	Australian Bight - Eyre Peninsula - Elliston - Blacks	Coastal - reef	White	Surfing near a seal and dolphins	Jevan Wright	Male	17	Fully consumed		743
2000-09-24	07:30	SA	Australian Bight - Ceduna - Cactus Beach	Coastal - reef	White	Surfing, in an area with Pinnipeds present	Cameron Bayes	Male	25	Fully consumed		744

== 1990s ==
Date	Time	State	Area	Site category	Species	Activity	Victim	Sex	Age	Injury	Reference	UIN
1999-05-29	14:30	SA	Spencer Gulf - Yorke Peninsula - Hardwicke Bay - Flahertys Beach	Coastal	White	Boarding or windsurfing	Tony Donoghue	Male	22	Body not recovered		729
1998-06-28	14:00	SA	Australian Bight - S Neptune Island	Coastal	White	Snorkeling, in an area with seals present	Doug Chesher	Male	26	Leg injuries		723
1997-01-20	18:00	WA	Geraldton		Tiger	windsurfing	Werner Schonhofer	Male	41	Eaten whole		
1995-09-11	15:00	WA	Hopetoun - Honeymoon Island	Island open ocean	White	Diving	David Alan Weir	Male	29	Eaten in half		691
1993-11-21	15:15	WA	Broome - Roebuck Bay	Coastal - bay to open ocean	Tiger	Diving	Richard Peter Bisley	Male	27			678
1993-06-09	09:30	NSW	Byron Bay - Julian Rocks	Coastal - surf beach	White	Diving	John Ford	Male	31	Consumed		677
1993-06-05	10:55	Tas	Tenth Island - Georgetown	Island open ocean	White	Diving, in an area with seals and scuba diving present	Therese Cartwright	Female	35	Remains not recovered		676
1992-10-01	14:30	Qld	Moreton Island - North Point	Coastal	White	Surfing	Michael Docherty	Male	28			672
1991-09-08	15:00	SA	Gulf St Vincent - Aldinga Beach	Coastal	White	Diving	Jonathon Lee	Male	19	Major lacerations - torso		665
1990-04-08	14:00	Qld	Townsville - Dingo Reef	Island open ocean - reef	Tiger	Snorkeling, freediving for trochus	Robert Bullen	Male	37	Body not recovered		653

== 1980s ==
Date	Time	State	Area	Site category	Species	Activity	Victim	Sex	Age	Injury	Reference	UIN
1989-03-09	20:15	SA	Encounter Bay - Waitpinga Beach	Coastal	White	Surfing	Matthew Foale	Male	27	Major lacerations - thigh		643
1988-11-08	Early morning	Qld	North Keppel Island, off Yeppoon	Open ocean	Tiger - 3	Swimming with a dinghy, after ship sank	Bruce Coucom	Male	17	Bitten in torso before shark swam away, body in mouth		636
1988-11-07	Nightfall	Qld	North Keppel Island, off Yeppoon		Tiger - 2	Swimming with a dinghy, after ship sank	Cedric Coucom	Male	62			635
1987-09-18		SA	Adelaide - Marino Rocks	Coastal	White	Diving, in an area with dolphins present	Terrance Gibson	Male	47			628
1987-02		Vic	Mornington Peninsula - Wilsons Prom	Coastal - open ocean	White	Surfing, in an area with spearfishing		Male		Major lacerations		625
1986-01		Qld	Torres Strait - Muralag (Prince of Wales Island)	Island open ocean	Tiger	Spearfishing		Male				617
1985-03-03	12:30	SA	Spencer Gulf - Port Lincoln - Wisemans Beach	Coastal	White	Diving for scallops	Shirley Durdin	Female	33	Major lacerations - torso; victim consumed		614
1984-11-30	12:33	Qld	Mackay - Blacks Beach	Coastal - surf beach	Tiger	Fell into water while sailing on catamaran	Nicholas Bos	Male	16	Major lacerations - arm, head, torso		611
1983-07-26	04:00	Qld	Great Barrier Reef - off Lodestone Reef	Ocean - pelagic	Tiger	Adrift after prawn trawling vessel sank	Linda Ann Horton	Female	21	Remains not recovered; seized by the chest and taken underwater		601
1983-07-25	Night	Qld	Great Barrier Reef - off Lodestone Reef	Pelagic	Tiger	Swimming from the New Venture	Dennis Patrick Murphy	Male	24	Remains not recovered; leg bitten, then dragged underwater		600
1982-03-07	12:00	NSW	Byron Bay - Tallow Beach	Coastal - surf beach	White	Surfing	Martin Ford	Male	20	Major lacerations - leg		598
1982-02-28		Tas	South Cape Bay	Coastal - bay to open ocean	White	≈	Geert Talen	Male	32	Remains not recovered		597

== 1970s ==
Date	Time	State	Area	Site categoryD	Species	Activity	Victim	Sex	Age	Injury	Reference	UIN
1977-08-23	16:00	Qld	Sunshine Coast - Caloundra - Buddina Beach (south of Noosa)	Coastal - surf beach	Tiger	Floating on an inflatable raft	George Walter	Male	25	Major lacerations - arm, torso, foot		579
1977-03-13	16:30	Qld	Near Moreton Island in Moreton Bay	Coastal	Tiger	Drifting in the sea, clinging to an icebox for 2 days, after cabin cruiser was struck by a freight ship	Victor Beaver	Male	74	Taken		577
1977-03-13	16:30	Qld	Near Moreton Island in Moreton Bay	Coastal	Tiger	Drifting in the sea, clinging to an icebox for 2 days, after cabin cruiser was struck by a freight ship	John Hayes	Male	45	Remains not recovered		576
1975-07-30	13:00	Tas	Bruny Island - Fluted Cape	Coastal - open ocean	White	Diving	Robert Slack	Male	37	Remains not recovered		572
1975-02-10	18:00	SA	Australian Bight - Ceduna - Point Sinclair	Coastal - bay to open ocean	White	Swimming near cray pots, in water containing fresh blood and offal	Wade Shipard	Male	12	Major lacerations - bit leg off		568
1975-01-19	11:00	SA	Australian Bight - Port Lincoln - Almonta Beach	Coastal	White	Surfing	David Barrowman	Male	17	Major lacerations - torso		566
1974-09-01		Qld	Stradbroke Island - Jumpinpin	Pelagic - open ocean	Tiger	Drifting in the current after boat sank	Adrian Te Veluwe	Male	23	Body never found		564
1974-01-09	13:00	SA	Australian Bight - Streaky Bay - Highcliff	Coastal	White	Diving	Terry Manuel	Male	26	Major lacerations - arm, leg, torso		563
1971-12-05	15:00	Qld	Gladstone - Cape Capricorn	Open ocean	Tiger	Swimming	Gregory Carroll	Male	20	Remains not recovered		552
1971-09-05		SA	Gulf St Vincent - Adelaide	Coastal		Fishing	Leslie Harris	Male	51	Suffered three heart attacks shortly after a shark bite		

== 1960s ==
Date	Time	State	Area	Site category	Species	Activity	Victim	Sex	Age	Injury	Reference	UIN
1967-08-19	11:00	WA	Jurien Bay	Coastal - bay to open ocean	White	Spearfishing, in an area with pinnipeds and other sharks present	Robert Bartle	Male	23	Major laceration - torso (bitten in two)		543
1966-05-20	After dark	NSW	Jervis Bay	Coastal - bay	White	Shipwreck	Daniel Mangel	Male	38	Major lacerations - arm, shoulder		
1966-05-20	Night	NSW	Jervis Bay	Coastal - bay	White	Shipwreck	Kor Van Helden	Male	40	consumed		
1965-11-21		Qld	Near Brisbane		Unconfirmed 4.7 m [15 ft]	Fishing from a boat when pulled overboard by hooked shark	Gordon Hobrook	Male	43			
1964-11-18	13:30	Qld	Fingal Beach, near Tweed Heads			Swimming out to rescue swimmers in difficulty	Glenthorne Prior	Male	29			
1963-01-28	13:30	NSW	Sydney Harbour - Middle Harbour	Estuary - bay	Bull	Standing in water	Marcia Hathaway	Female	32	Major lacerations - leg		523
1962-12-09	14:30	SA	Gulf St Vincent - Carrickalinga Headland	Coastal	White	spearfishing, with baitfish	Geoffrey Corner	Male	16	Major lacerations - leg		522
1961-12-28	16:15	Qld	Mackay - Lamberts Beach	Coastal - surf beach	Tiger	Swimming	Margaret Hobbs	Female	18	Major lacerations - arms (right severed at shoulder, left hand severed), leg; died the next day		516
1961-12-18	06:15	Qld	Sunshine Coast - Noosa Heads - Main Beach	Coastal - surf beach	Bull	Surfing	John Grayson Andrews	Male	22	Major lacerations - leg (severed), arm		514
1960-01-16	15:30	NSW	Sydney Harbour - Roseville Bridge	Estuary - bay	Bull	Snorkeling, in an area with baitfish present	Kenneth Murray	Male	13	Major lacerations - leg (severed)		499

== 1950s ==
Date	Time	State	Area	Site category	Species	Activity	Victim	Sex	Age	Injury	Reference	UIN
1959-12-19	06:00	Qld	Moreton Bay - off Wynnum		Tiger	Swimming from dinghy to retrieve oar in heavy seas	Stanley Arthur Mullen	Male	29	Major lacerations		496
1959-01-17	16:30	Tas	Port Arthur - Safety Cove	Coastal - bay to open ocean	White - multiple	Swimming	Brian Derry	Male	22	Body not recovered		489
1958-11-23	15:15	Qld	Surfers Paradise	coastal	Tiger	Swimming	Peter Gerard Spronk	Male	21	Major lacerations - torso		486
1958-03		Qld	Torres Strait - Masig (Yorke) Island	Island open ocean	Tiger	Spearfishing		Male	24	Major lacerations - leg		483
1957-02		WA	Cape Leveque	Coastal - open ocean	Tiger	Swimming		Male				475
1956-03-04	16:45	Vic	Portsea Beach	Coastal - surf beach	White	Swimming	John Wishart	Male	26			471
1956-02-26	11:00	Qld	Mackay - Pioneer River - Rocklea Reach	River	Bull	Swimming	Barry Keith Antonini	Male	15	Major lacerations - leg		467
1955-03-09	18:00	NSW	Central Coast - Wamberal Beach	Coastal	White	Swimming	Noel Langford	Male	22	Body not recovered		464
1955-02-05	14:35	NSW	Sydney Harbour - Sugarloaf Bay	Estuary - bay	Bull	Swimming	Bruno Rautenberg	Male	25	Major lacerations - leg		463
1955-01-18	14:30	NSW	Sydney Harbour - BalmoralBeach - Wyargine Point	Estuary - bay	Bull	Spearfishing	John Willis	Male	13	Major lacerations - leg, hand		462
1954-12-11	11:00	Vic	Point Lonsdale		White	Swimming	Lawrence Burns	Male	23			
1954-09-04		Qld	Torres Strait - Erub (Darley Island)	Island open ocean	Tiger	Spearfishing, hunting crayfish	Kapua Gutchen	Male	35	Major lacerations		461
1954-02-27	17:15	NSW	Central Coast - The Entrance	Coastal	White	Swimming	Reg Fabrizius	Male	23	Major lacerations - thigh		459
1951-12-06	16:00	NSW	Newcastle - Merewether Beach	Coastal	White	Swimming	Frank Olkulich	Male	21	Major lacerations - arm, leg, torso		442
1951-10-22	19:10	Qld	Townsville - Kissing Point Beach ocean baths	Coastal	Tiger	Swimming	Arthur James Kenealey	Male	42	Major lacerations - hand, torso, thigh		441
1951-09-04		Qld	Fitzroy River, near Rockhampton	River	Bull	Major lacerations - leg, torso; found on luxury yacht	Dr. E. Al Joske	Male	56	Major lacerations - leg, torso		440
1950-12-16	16:15	Qld	Brisbane - Palm Beach North, 5 miles [8.0 km] north of Burleigh Heads	Coastal	Tiger	Treading water	Desmond Quinlan, a lifesaver	Male	20	Major lacerations - leg, torso		436
1950-04-09		Qld	Cairns - Ella Bay - Cooper Point	Coastal	Tiger	Swimming, after shipwreck	John McDonald	Male	50	Major lacerations		433

== 1940s ==
Date	Time	State	Area	Site category	Species	Activity	Victim	Sex	Age	Injury	Reference	UIN
1949-11-12		Vic	Port Phillip - Middle Brighton Pier	Coastal - bay	Unknown	Unknown	John W Smith	Male		Body, without head or hands found in bay		
1949-08-28	13:20	Qld	Cairns - Yorkeys Knob Beach	Coastal	Tiger	Swimming	James Howard	Male	34	Major lacerations - torso; right leg, thigh and fingers lacerated		430
1949-04-17	13:30	Qld	Cairns - Ellis Beach	Coastal	Tiger	Bathing in water 90 cm [2 ft 11 in] deep	Richard Joseph Maguire	Male	13	Major lacerations - leg		426
1949-01-23	15:00	NSW	Newcastle - Bar Beach	Coastal	White	Swimming	Ray Land	Male	20			
1948-12-27		WA	Lancelin Island		Tiger	Swimming	Arthur Strahan	Male	17	Eaten whole		
1948-12-26	11:30	Qld	Sunshine Coast - Caloundra - King's Beach	Coastal - surf beach	Tiger	Treading water, waiting for a wave	Eric Keys	Male	28	Major lacerations - arm, leg, pelvic region		419
1948-02-12		NSW	Newcastle - Stockton Beach	Coastal	Tiger	Swimming	Ronald Johnson	Male	16	Major lacerations - torso, leg		417
1947-11-30		Qld	Moreton Bay				D. Smith		78			
1947-11-08	16:00	NSW	Port Macquarie - Wilson River	River	Bull	Swimming	Edwin Elford	Male	12	Major lacerations - leg		413
1946-11-20		Qld	Torres Strait - Thursday Island - 64 km off	Island open ocean - reef	Tiger	Pearl diving from lugger	Esrona Johnson, a Torres Strait Islander man	Male	30	Major lacerations - arm		409
1946-08-18	15:20	Qld	Cairns - Ellis Beach	Coastal	Tiger	Swimming after a tennis ball	Phillip South Collin	Male	30	Major lacerations - torso		407
1946-04-19	13:30	Qld	Cairns - Trinity Beach	Coastal	Tiger	Swimming	Robert McAuliffe	Male	17	Major lacerations - arm, leg		406
1946-01-05		NSW	Sydney - Georges River, Oatley Bay	River	Bull	Swimming	Valma Tegel	Female	14	Major lacerations - leg		404
1945-06-15	16:00	Qld	Cairns - Trinity Beach	Coastal	Tiger	Swimming	E. J. McHugh	Male				402
1943-05-14	After 04:00	Qld	off Brisbane			Awaiting rescue from a hospital ship torpedoed by a Japanese submarine during WWII						
1942-12-26	10:50	NSW	Sydney Harbour - Bantry Bay	Estuary	Bull	Swimming	Denise Burch	Female	15	Major lacerations - leg		398
1942-01-04	15:00	NSW	Sydney Harbour - Bantry Bay	Estuary	Bull	Swimming	Zita Steadman	Female	28	Major lacerations - torso		393
1941-10		Qld	Torres Strait - Badu Island	Island open ocean	Tiger	Swimming		Male				390
1940-12-28	09:00	NSW	Newcastle - Stockton Beach	Coastal	Tiger	Swimming	Clarence Hammond	Male	23	Injuries to torso		388
1940-02-04	14:00	NSW	Sydney - Botany Bay - Brighton-Le-Sands	Estuary - bay to open ocean	Bull	Wading	John William Eke	Male	55	Injuries to both arms		385
1940-01-23	10:40	NSW	Sydney - Botany Bay - Brighton-Le-Sands	Estuary - bay to open ocean	Tiger	Swimming	Maxwell Farrin	Male	13	Left leg severed		384

== 1930s ==
Date	Time	State	Area	Site category	Species	Activity	Victim	Sex	Age	Injury	Reference	UIN
1939-12-14	12:15	Qld	Mackay - Rubbish Dump Creek	River	2.6 m [8.5 ft] shark landed 2 hours later	Swimming	Frank Gurran	Male	20	Major lacerations - leg and foot		380
1938-12-27		NSW	Urunga		Unknown	Swimming	Daniel Graham	Male	19	Not recovered		
1938-07-12		NT	Off Bathurst Island			Hardhat diving from Japanese pearling lugger, Reiyo Maru	Okada	Male	25	Body not recovered		372
1938-06		Qld	Torres Strait	Island open ocean - reef		Diving		Male		Body not recovered		371
1937-11-11		Qld	Ota/Otter Reef		unconfirmed - 3.7 m [12 ft] shark	Diving for trochus	Nelan Kris	Male	17			366
1937-10-27	17:30	Qld	Coolangatta - Kirra Beach	Coastal	Tiger - A 3.6 m [12 ft], 850 kg [1,870 lb] Female contained Girvan's remains	Swimming	Norman Girvan	Male	18	Remains found in shark		363
1937-10-27	17:30	Qld	Coolangatta - Kirra Beach	Coastal	Tiger	Swimming	Jack Brinkley	Male	25			364
1937-07-16		NT	Elcho Island			Pearl diving	Japanese hard hat diver	Male				
1937-05-15	Night	Qld	Townsville - Ross Creek	Estuary	2 days later a 270 kg [600 lb] shark was caught 91 m [100 yd] from the site	Swimming across the river after being refused permission to cross on the ferry	William Tennant	Male	33	Major lacerations - leg, hand		360
1937-02-13	15:20	NSW	Newcastle - Bar Beach	Coastal	White	Swimming	John Welsh	Male	32	Major lacerations - torso, leg		358
1936-12-12	11:30	NSW	Newcastle - Throsby Creek	Estuary	Bull	Swimming	George Lundberg	Male	15	Leg severed		356
1936-12-01		Vic	Mordialloc		White	Fishing	Charles Swann	Male	46			
1936-06-26		Qld	Torres Strait - Nepean Island	Island open ocean	Tiger - 2.4 m [7 ft 10 in]	Swimming to surface after diving for trochus	Willie, an Indigenous Australian	Male	16			351
1936-02-04	15:00	NSW	Sydney - Manly - S Steyne	Coastal - surf beach	White	Swimming	David Paton	Male	14	Body not recovered		345
1936-01-22	18:00	SA	Gulf St Vincent - Adelaide - West Beach	Coastal - beach to open ocean	White	Swimming	Ray Bennett	Male	13			344
1936		Vic	Port Phillip			Swimming		Male				
1935-08-26	Night	Qld	At Flat Top, near Mackay	Pelagic	Unknown - 3.7 m [12 ft]	Fell overboard, hanging onto lifebuoy	Patrick Quinn	Male	38	Body not recovered, but sharks were caught with human remains thought to be those of Quinn		
1935-08-13		Qld	Torres Strait - Warrior Reefs	Pelagic		Diving for beche-de-mer from lugger	Barani, a Papuan	Male		Major lacerations - right buttock and thigh		340
1935-03-09	12:30	NSW	Maroubra Beach	Coastal - surf beach	White	Swimming	Ernest MacDonald	Male	27	Multiple injuries		335
1935-03-02	17:30	NSW	Sydney - North Narrabeen Beach	Coastal - surf beach	White	Standing	Herbert McFarlane	Male	22	Thigh bitten		338
1935-01		Qld	Torres strait - unknown pearl beds	Island open ocean - reef	Tiger	Swimming		Male				333
1934-12-31	16:30	NSW	Georges River Moorebank	Estuary	Bull	Swimming	Richard Soden	Male	19	Left leg bitten		330
1934-12-23	13:00	NSW	Central Coast - Horsefield Bay - Brisbane Waters	Estuary	Bull	Swimming	Roy Inman	Male	14			331
1934-10-22		Qld	Torres Strait - Warrior Reef Islands	Island open ocean - reef		Freediving for trochus shell (submerged)	David Younger, a Torres Strait Islander	Male		Forearm lacerated; died of gas gangrene 13 days later		327
1934-10-09		NT	Cobourg Peninsula - Redcliff	Coastal		Bathing	Aboriginal woman	Female	38			328
1934-08-26		Qld	Off Eva Island 32 km [20 miles] from Cardwell	Coastal		Swimming, immediately after entering the sea	Robert Steele	Male		Body not recovered		326
1934-04-01	12:30	NSW	Sydney - Manly, North Steyne	Coastal - surf beach	White	Swimming	Leon Hermes	Male	15	Right leg injures		325
1934-03-12	15:00	NSW	Sydney - Dee Why Beach	Coastal - surf beach	White	Swimming	Frank Athol Riley	Male	17	Leg removed		323
1933-11-20		Qld	Torres Strait - near Boydong Cay		Tiger - 3.4 m [11 ft 2 in]	Freediving for trochus	Bili, a Papuan	Male		Major lacerations - right buttock and thigh		316
1933-01-04	17:30	Qld	Townsville - Strand Beach, Kissing Point	Coastal		Swimming	Stanley Victor Locksley	Male	38	285		309
1932-05-12		Qld	Torres Strait - near Warrior Reefs	Island open ocean		Pearl diving	Henry Solomon, Cape York native	Male				305
1931-08-01		Qld	Port Douglas			Fell overboard?	Llewellyn Roberts	Male				
1931-03-22		Qld	Townsville - Ross Creek	Estuary		Fishing with a cast net	Arthur Tomida	Male	19	Left thigh bitten		299
1930-12-31		NSW	Parramatta River		Unknown			Male				
1930-12-13		NSW	Sydney Harbour	Estuary	Unknown	Fell overboard	Frank Kenny	Male				
1930-07		Qld	Torres Strait - Badu Island	Island open ocean	Tiger	Snorkelling		Male	16			292
1930-06-04		Qld	Torres Strait - Mabuiag Island	Island open ocean			Ibigan, a Torres Strait Islander	Male				291
1930-02-15	16:30	Vic	Port Philip - Middle Brighton Pier	Coastal - bay	White	Swimming	Norman Clark	Male	18			289

== 1920s ==
Year	Date	Time	State	Area	Site category	Species	Activity	Victim	Sex	Age	Injury	Reference	UIN
1929	1929-12-26		NSW	Sydney Harbour - Bald Rock Wharf, White Bay	Estuary	Bull	Swimming	William Oakley	Male	16	Multiple injuries		285
1929	1929-12-03 (reported)		Qld	Townsville - Ross Creek	Estuary				Male	50s			283
1929	1929-09-01		Qld	Townsville - Ross Creek	Estuary		Fell from wharf into water & attacked immediately	Edward William Hobbs	Male	42	Both legs injured		281
1929	1929-04-09		Qld	Torres Strait - Badu Island	Island open ocean				Male				
1929	1929-04-04		Qld	Torres Strait - Badu Island	Island open ocean		Swimming between boats	Ned Luffman, a Torres Strait Islander	Male				
1929	1929-03-12		Qld	Torres Strait - Dauan Island	Island open ocean		Bathing	A Torres Strait Islander schoolboy	Male				275
1929	1929-02-18	15:30	NSW	Sydney - Maroubra Beach	Coastal - surf beach	White	Swimming	Allan Butcher	Male	20	Multiple injuries		269
1929	1929-02-08	16:00	NSW	Sydney - Bondi Beach	Coastal - surf beach	White	Swimming	John Gibson	Male	39	Leg injuries		270
1929	1929-01-27	17:30	Qld	Townsville - Magnetic Island - Alma Bay	Coastal		Swimming	Harry Weatherall	Male	18	Major lacerations - arm, torso		265
1929	1929-01-12	18:10	NSW	Sydney - Bondi Beach	Coastal - surf beach	White	Body surfing	Colin Stewart	Male	14	Leg injuries		267
1928	1928-04-04	18:00	NSW	Newcastle - Cooks Hill - Bar Beach	Coastal	White	Swimming - 1m depth	Edward Arthur Lane	Male	28	Major lacerations - hand, leg, torso		262
1928	1928-03-28 (reported)		Qld					Bob	Male				
1928	1928-02-20		Qld	Near Barrow Point	Island open ocean - reef		Pearl diving	Wanewa, a Torres Strait Islander	Male				258
1928	1928-01-27		Qld	Torres Strait - Deliverance Island	Island open ocean		Retrieving meat from a cage in the water	Harry Envoldt	Male	78			257
1927	1927-05-09 (reported)		Qld	Off Cairns	Coastal		Walking	Quassa, a Torres Strait Islander	Male				255
1927	1927-01-03	11:30	NSW	Sydney - Port Hacking - Grays Point	River	Tiger	Swimming	Mervwyn Allum	Male	15	Leg bitten from thigh to ankle		250
1927	1927		NSW	24 km [15 miles] up the Cataract River	River	Swimming			Male	10	Shoulder bitten		
1926	1926-12-02		Qld	Palm Island	Island open ocean - reef		Diving for trochus	Norman Skeen	Male				248
1926	1926-03-17	15:45	SA	Gulf St Vincent - Adelaide - Brighton Pier	Coastal - ocean beach	White	Swimming	Primrose Whyte	Female				245
1925	1925-11-22	15:15	WA	Perth - Cottesloe Beach	Coastal - surf beach	White	Floating on his back	Simeon (Samuel) Ettelton	Male	55	Thigh & torso bitten		244
1925	1925-03-12	15:15	NSW	Newcastle Beach	Coastal	White	Swimming	Jack Canning	Male	16	Right forearm severed, lacerations from buttocks to heel		243
1924	1924-04-25	Afternoon	NSW	Kiama - Blowhole	Coastal - ocean beach	White	Fishing, fell in water and swimming to shore	Ernest Conroy	Male	20	Partial remains recovered		240
1924	1924-01-09	16:00	NSW	Sydney - Parramatta River - near Camellia	River	Bull	Swimming soon after diving into water	Charles Brown	Male	16	Right thigh severely bitten, left arm lacerated		237
1923	1923-12-02		NSW	Bellinger Heads - Urunga	Coastal	White	Fishing in waist-deep water	James Elton	Male		Disappeared while attempting to haul in a catch		
1923	1923-11-23		WA	Port Hedland - Condon Creek	Coastal - open ocean		Dry shelling Pinctada albina, as forced labour	Selim Opre, a local Aboriginal man	Male		Partial remains found		235
1923	1923-11-23		WA	Port Hedland - Condon Creek	Coastal - open ocean		Dry shelling Pinctada albina, as forced labour	Dea Opre, a local Aboriginal man	Male		Body not recovered		234
1923	1923-11-02		NSW	Bellinger Heads		Suspected shark involvement	Fishing		Male		Body not recovered		
1923	1923-06-16		NSW	Wollongong - Bellambi	Coastal	White	Attempting to swim ashore after rowing skiff was holed by shark	J. Rigby	Male		Taken by shark; two other men drowned, only 1 man survived		232
1923	1923-05-22	Midday	Qld	Great Barrier Reef	pelagic - reef		Diving?	Keizo Masoyo	Male				229
1923	1923-01-27		WA	Swan River, Freshwater Bay, Claremont	River		Swimming	Charles Topsail Robertson	Male	13	Back of thigh bitten		226
1920 - 1923			Qld	Great Barrier Reef				Three (3) Japanese divers	Males				
1922	1922-12-05	09:15	Qld	Maryborough - Hervey Bay - Pialba Beach	Coastal - beach to open ocean	A 2.7 m [8 ft 10 in] "blue" shark	Bathing in water - depth 1.2 m [3.9 ft]	Alfred Gassman	Male	19	Severe injuries to torso		225
1922	1922-04-26		NSW	Hawkesbury River	River	Unknown	Swimming	William A Munro	Male				
1922	1922-03-02	11:00	NSW	Sydney - Coogee Beach	Coastal - surf beach	White - 2.4 m [7.9 ft]	Bathing in knee-deep water	Mervyn Gannon	Male	21	Right hand severed; lacerations on left thigh & left hand; died of gas gangrene		224
1922	1922-02-04	15:30	NSW	Sydney - Coogee Beach	Coastal - surf beach	Thought to be a White	Swimming	Milton Coughlan	Male	18	Both arms & shoulder bitten		223
1922	1922-01-15	17:30	Qld	Townsville - Ross Creek	Estuary		Swimming	Robert Milroy	Male	54			222
1922	1922-01-04	Evening	NSW	Newcastle - Stockton Beach			Surfing	John Manning Rowe	Male	26	Disappeared, then his shark-bitten remains washed ashore		
1921	1921-11-27	Morning	Qld	Brisbane River -Bulimba Reach - Gay's Corner	River		Fell from his father's back into the water	George Jack	Male	8	Body not recovered		218
1921	1921-10-04	Afternoon	Qld	Great Barrier Reef	Pelagic		Diving for beche-de-mer	Yoichi Schamok	Male	22	Left thigh bitten		
1920	1920-01-24 (reported)		Qld	Arlington Reef	Pelagic - reef		Freediving	A Japanese diver	Male				217
1920	1920-01-15	10:00	NSW	Newcastle - Throsby Creek	Estuary	Bull	Swimming	David Miller	Male		Leg bitten		207

== 1910s ==
Year	Date	Time	State	Area	Site category	Species	Activity	Victim	Sex	Age	Injury	Reference	UIN
1919	1919-12-07	05:30	NSW	Macleay River - Pelican Island	River	Bull	Swimming	James Ridley	Male	47	Left leg & calf bitten		206
1919	1919-01-09	07:30	NSW	Sydney Harbour - Sirius Cove	Estuary	Unknown - 3.7 m [12 ft]	Wading	Richard Simpson	Male	13	Right thigh bitten		203
1919	1919-01-05	10:00	Qld	Townsville - Ross Creek	Estuary		Wading while shrimping	Jack Hoey	Male	38	Thigh bitten		204
1918	1918-11	1500	Qld	Arlington Reef - Green Island	Pelagic	Tiger	Snorkeling		Male		Major lacerations - torso		201
1918	1918-09-19		Qld	Townsville - Strand Beach	Coastal		Bathing	Joseph Bartlett	Male	22			200
1916	1916-12		QLD	Yeppoon - Mens Beach	Coastal	Tiger	Swimming		Male	26	Major lacerations - calf		191
1916	1916-12-08	09:00	NSW	Sydney Harbour - Sugarloaf Point - Seven Shillings Beach	Estuary	Unknown	Returning to shore after rescuing wife from shark attack, 1 m [1.1 yd] from the shore	Walter C German	Male	41	Right arm severed, chest punctured		
1916	1916-11		WA	Port Hedland - Condon Creek	Coastal - open ocean	Tiger	Snorkelling		Male		Major lacerations - leg		189
1916	1916-11-10	06:00	Qld	Townsville - Strand Beach	Coastal		Swimming	Walter Gregson	Male				187
1916	1916-11-09	Evening	Qld	Townsville - Kissing Point Camp	Coastal		Bathing	Robert Alexander Poultney	Male	27			186
1916	1916-04-25		NSW	Manly Beach	Coastal - surf beach		Swimming	Thomas Harrington	Male				
1916	1916-04-03		Vic	Carrum			clinging to overturned rowing boat	Monte Robinson & Andrew McNeill	Males	17			
1915	1915-01-01		NSW	Sydney Harbour - Sirius Cove	Estuary	Unknown	Bathing about 91 m [100 yd] from shore	Warren Tooze	Male	17	Upper leg injury		180
1914	1914-06-10	Afternoon	Vic	Port Phillip - Sandringham Beach	Coastal - bay		Swimming	Mr Croxford	Male	43			177
1912	1912-01-26	15:00	NSW	Sydney Harbour - Lane Cove River - Figtree	River	Unconfirmed - 2.8 m [9 ft 2 in] whaler type shark, possibly a bull	Swimming	James Edward Morgan	Male	21			161
1912	1912-01-01	Morning	Qld	Townsville - Ross Creek	Estuary		Bathing	Samuel Tristing	Male				162
1911	1911-03		Qld	Torres Strait - Thursday Island	Island open ocean	Tiger	Swimming		Male	16	Major lacerations - torso, thigh		158
1910	1910-12-23		WA	Green Island			Escaping a shipwrecked pearling schooner	Captain and all but one crew	Males				
1910	1910-01-26		NSW	Newcastle Harbour	Estuary			Alfred Victor Clulow	Male	16			153

== 1900s ==
Year	Date	Time	State	Area	Site category	Species	Activity	Victim	Sex	Age	Injury	Reference	UIN
1909	1909-12-15		NSW	40 km [25 miles] off Sydney	Open ocean	Unknown	Fell overboard	Mr C Witt	Male				
1909	1909-06-18		Qld	Middleton Reef, 560 km [300 nmi] from Brisbane			Awaiting rescue following shipwreck				Some of the 17 dead were taken by sharks; others drowned or died of other causes; only legs, still in sea-boots, were recovered		
1908	1908-12-31		Qld	Moreton Bay			Fell into the water	Lieutenant Hexton	Male				
1908	1908-09-21		Qld	Torres Strait - Thursday Island			Fell from the jetty	Kong Choong Ting	Male		Remains recovered from 3 sharks		
1907	1907-12-23		NSW	Sydney Harbour - Sugarloaf Bay	Estuary	Bull	Bathing	Henry Jones	Male				151
1907	1907-10-18		Qld	Torres Strait - Thursday Island			Bathing	Male from the lugger Teazer	Male				
1907	1907-02-03	Morning	Qld	Townsville - Ross Creek	Estuary		Bathing	William Williams	Male	18			148
1906	1906-09-05		Qld	Torres Strait - Mabuiag Island			Swimming	Smith	Male				146
1906	1906-04-14		Qld	Lizard Island	Island open ocean		Diving for beche-de-mer	Charley	Male	17			145
1906	1906-01-28	14:10	NSW	Sydney - Georges River - The Moons (near Lugarno)	River	Bull	Bathing	William Joseph Dobson	Male	31 or 33			144
1905	1905-12		Qld	Torres Strait - Badu Island	Island open ocean	Tiger	Snorkeling		Male		Major lacerations - thigh		143
1905	1905-03-25		Tas	Bridport			Bathing	Charles Taylor	Male				
pre–1906			NSW	Sydney Harbour - under Pyrmont Bridge, Darling Harbour		Bull or Grey Nurse	Swimming in murky water near floating logs	An Arab boy	Male		Not recovered		
1904	1904-02-07		Qld	Brisbane			Swimming after his hat	George Grant	Male				
1903	1903-06-21		NSW	Sydney - Georges River	River	Cause of death was actually drowning: the coroner ruled William's death a drowning by asphyxia, dismissing reports of a shark attack	Boat capsized in the water	William Price	Male				
1903	1903-03-12		Qld	Logan River	River		Swimming	William Bartlett	Male				139
1903	1903-01-10		NSW	Sydney Harbour - Lane Cove River	Estuary	Bull		Sydney James	Male				137
1902	1902-01-25		NSW	Kerosene Bay		Unknown	Dangling feet in the water	John Ogier	Male				
pre–1903			WA	Broome - Roebuck Bay	Coastal - bay to open ocean		Diving		Male				
pre–1903			WA				Pearl diving	Ahmun	Male				
1901	1901-01-30		Qld	Brisbane River - Rowing Club	River		Bathing	John Thompson	Male		Thigh bitten		130
1900	1900-12-27		NSW	Sydney Harbour - Middle Harbour - Folly Point	Estuary - bay	Bull	Bathing	Thomas Houstan	Male	21	Major lacerations - leg		128
1900	1900-11		Qld	Torres Strait - unknown pearl beds	Island open ocean		Snorkelling		Male				127

== Before 1900 ==
Year	Date	Time	State	Area	Site category	Species	Activity	Victim	Sex	Age	Injury	Reference	UIN
1898	1898-12-28		Qld	The Narrows		Unknown	Fell overboard	James Waters	Male				
1898	1898-07-26 (reported)		NSW	Sydney			Swimming after their boat capsized	Martin Gunner	Male	20	Source labels incident as a 'questionable incident'; it was extract from newspaper advertising testimonial for pills		
1896	1896-11-29		WA	Albany	Coastal - harbour		Swimming	Davies	Male				
1896	1896-11-01		WA	Esperance	Coastal - harbour		Boat swamped	Louis	Male				117
1896	1896-01-11	Afternoon	NSW	Sydney Harbour - Johnstons Bay - Pyrmont Baths	Estuary - bay	Bull	Bathing	William Ready	Male	11	Major lacerations - torso		116
1895	1895-12-16		NSW	Jervis Bay	Estuary - bay	Unknown	Fishing	Edward Bailey	Male				
1895	1895-12-09		NSW	Sydney - West Balmain - Iron Cove Bridge	Estuary - bay	Bull	Bathing	Thomas John Terrill	Male	14	Major lacerations - torso		115
1895	1895-11		NSW	Jervis Bay - Governors Head	Coastal - bay to open ocean	A whaler	Swimming		Male		Body not recovered		113
1895	1895-06-03 (reported)		WA	Barrow Island - Barrow Passage	Island open ocean - open ocean		Pearl diving	A Japanese diver	Male				112
1895	1895-02-27		NSW	Sydney Harbour	Estuary - bay	Bull	Swimming	James Edward Clifton Donald	Male	14	Major lacerations - leg		110
1893	1893-04-04	16:30	Tas	George's Bay - Chimney Point			Swimming ashore after boat capsized	Joseph Meredith	Male				
1893	1893-01		Qld	Claremont Isles National Park	Pelagic - reef	Tiger	Swimming		Male		Body not recovered		106
1892	1892-03-06		Qld	Torres Strait - Badu Island	Island open ocean		Dress diving	Mr A. Rotaman	Male		Bitten in two by shark after provoking it with a knife		
1892	1892-01		Qld	Torres Strait - Badu Island	Island open ocean - reef	Tiger	Diving		Male		Major lacerations - torso		101
1890	1890-12-30		Qld	Moreton Bay			Swimming to shore after boat capsized by a squall	C. Gregory			Death may have been due to drowning		
1889	1889-07-08		Vic	Port Phillip - Bay Heads	Pelagic - open ocean		Fell into the water		Male				97
1888	1888-12-31		NSW	Hawkesbury Bridge, Sydney	Estuary - bay	Unknown	Working on the bridge when he fell into the river	Mr Ryland	Male				
1888	1888-12-09	13:00	NSW	Sydney Harbour - Iron Cove Bridge	Estuary - bay	Bull	Swimming	Stephen Carter	Male	11	Major lacerations - torso		96
1887	1887-12-04	11:30	NSW	Sydney Harbour - Ryde, Parramatta River	River	Bull	Swimming	Thomas Cochrane (William Charles Corkhill)	Male	25	Major lacerations - torso, leg, pelvic area		94
1886	1886-06-17		Qld	Off Bribie Heads			Swimming after being washed overboard	Lacoon	Male	18			
1884	1884-01-14		SA	Spencer Gulf - Port Pirie	Coastal	White - 2 sharks	Swimming; Fell overboard	Miss Warren	Female	16	Remains not recovered		88
1883	1883-12-19	12:00	NSW	Sydney Harbour - Parramatta River - Blackwall	Estuary - bay	Unknown	Swimming	Cuthbert Vere Lysaght	Male	21			86
1883	1883-02-25		NT	Pearling beds			Diving		Male				
1883	1883-01-21	05:30	NSW	Sydney Harbour - Iron Cove	Estuary - bay	Unknown	Bathing	John Eaton	Male	37			85
1882	1882-12		WA	Broome	Coastal - bay to open ocean	Tiger	Snorkeling		Male				84
1882	1882-05-12 (reported)		WA	Broome - Ninety Mile Beach	Coastal - beach to open ocean		Pearl diving	A Malay diver	Male		Major lacerations - torso		83
1882	1882-04-15		NSW	Lake Macquarie	Estuary	Unknown	Fishing		Male				81
1882	1882-02-07		WA				Pearl diving	A native diver	Male		Thigh bitten		
1882	1882-01-23 (reported)		NSW	Darling Harbour, Sydney		Unknown	Bathing	George Sinclair	Male				
1881	1881-11		NSW	Sydney Harbour - Rushcutters Bay	Estuary - bay	Bull	Swimming		Male		Body not recovered		78
1880	1880-11-25	Afternoon	Qld	Petrie Bight, Brisbane River - Kangaroo Point	River		Swimming	Alexey Drury	Male	12	Feet bitten		74
1880	1880		Tas	St George's Bay					Male				
1880	1880-01		Qld	Cairns - Fitzroy Island	Island open ocean	Tiger	Swimming		Male		Body not recovered		71
1879	1879-06		NSW	Sydney Harbour - Darling Harbour	Estuary - bay	Bull	Swimming		Male		Major lacerations - leg		69
1878			NSW	Sydney - Balmain	Estuary	Unknown	Bathing in 61 cm [2 ft] of water		Male	11	Leg severed		
1877	1877-12-12		NSW	Near Sydney		Unknown	Washed overboard from the barque Mary Eady	2 Males	Male				
1877	1877-01-28		Vic	Port Phillip - Emerald Hill	Coastal - bay		Bathing	William Marks	Male	30	Flesh on legs torn out; bites to face and torso		60
1876	1876-05-14		NSW	Sydney Harbour	Estuary	Unknown	Swimming	Frederick Brown	Male				
1876	1876-02-06	06:00	Vic	Port Phillip - Albert Park pier	Coastal - bay		Bathing	Peter Rooney	Male	18	Major lacerations - leg, pelvic region		57
1876	1876-02		Qld	Torres Strait - unknown pearl beds	Island open ocean	Tiger	snorkeling		Male		Major lacerations - torso		56
1875	1875-10		Qld	Torres Strait - unknown pearl beds	Island open ocean	Tiger	Snorkeling		Male		Major lacerations - leg		51
1876			NSW	Sydney		Unknown		An unnamed boy	Male				
1875	1875		WA	Shark Bay			Sitting on gunwale of boat	Andrew Farmer	Male				
1872	1872-02-26		Qld	Bramble Reef			Ship-wrecked				Some were taken by sharks		
1871			NSW	Manning River	River	Unknown			Male		"Caught by legs"		
1870	1870-12-31		Tas	Derwent River			Canoeing	Sub Lieut Bowyer of HMS Chile	Male				
1865	1865-11		Vic	Port Phillip - Williamstown	Coastal - bay	White	Swimming		Male	33	Major lacerations - thigh		39
1864	1864		Vic	Port Phillip - Corio Bay			Swimming, attempting to rescue his dog who had fallen from his boat	Mr Warren Jr	Male		Disappeared suddenly; shark involvement presumed		
1863	1863-04-30		Qld	Sunshine Coast - Caloundra Heads	Coastal - surf beach	Unknown - 2 sharks	Launching a boat	Mr Barnsfield	Male				38
1863	1863-01		Qld	Moreton Bay - Victoria Point	Coastal	Tiger	Swimming		Male		Body not recovered		36
1863	1863-01-10	Evening	NSW	Manning River - "Bellynahinch"	River	Unknown	Bathing	James Brown	Male	17			35
1862	1862-12-19		Qld	Brisbane River	River		Trying to catch a wounded bird		Male				34
1858	1858-03-14	15:00	Vic	Port Phillip - Hobsons Bay	Coastal - bay		Bathing	Adolphe Bollander	Male	22			30
1855	1855-11		NSW	Sydney Harbour - Millers Point	Estuary - bay	Bull	Swimming		Male		Major lacerations - leg		27
1855	1855-11-11		Vic	Port Phillip - Williamstown	Coastal - bay		Swimming	A seaman from whaling brig Curlew	Male				
1855	1855-07		Qld	Torres Strait - Keriri (Hammond) Island	Island open ocean	Tiger	Swimming		Male		Major lacerations - torso		26
1855	1855-03-28		SA	Gulf St Vincent - Port Wakefield			Fell overboard	Master Coleman	Male				
1853	1853		Qld	Moreton Bay			Fell into the water	James Hexton, pilot	Male				
1852	1852-10-09		NSW	Coalcliff		Unknown	Fell overboard	James Rogers	Male				
1850	1850-01		Qld	Moreton Bay	Coastal	Tiger shark	Swimming		Male		Body not recovered		21
1849	1849-12-09		NSW	Sydney Harbour	Estuary - bay	Bull			Male				
1849	1849-12-01	Afternoon	NSW	Sydney Harbour - Woolloomooloo Bay	Estuary - bay	Unknown	Bathing	A Sailor from the steamship Eagle	Male				
1849	1849-09-19		Vic	Warrnambool			Swimming	A sailor from the schooner Brother	Male				
1849	1849-01		WA	Dunsborough - Castle Rock - Quindalup	Pelagic - open ocean	White	Swimming		Male				18
1845	1845-12-26		NSW	Newcastle		Unknown	Fishing; fell overboard	John Williams	Male				
1843	1843-09-14		Tas	Between Pt Arthur Penal Colony and Forestier Peninsula			Swimming to escape imprisonment	Owen	Male				
1841	1841-03-27	14:00	NSW	Sydney Harbour - Cockatoo Island	Estuary - bay	Bull	Bathing	Andrew Goggin	Male	22	Major lacerations - thigh		15
1840	1840–12		NSW	Sydney Harbour - Woolloomooloo Bay - off The Domain	Estuary - bay	Bull	Swimming; dead whale in the water		Male	18	Major lacerations - legs		14
1839	1839-08-07		Vic	Wilsons Prom - Sealer's Cove	Coastal	White	Swimming from capsized whale boat	Captain Wishart of the whaler Wallaby	Male	39	Major lacerations - legs		13
1837	1837-01-17	Evening	NSW	Macleay River	River	Bull	Washing his feet	Alfred Australia Howe	Male	12	Major lacerations on leg; later died due to tetanus		12
1836	1836-08		Qld	K'gari (Fraser Island) to Inskip Point	Coastal	A whaler	Swimming		Male		Body not recovered		11
1836	1836-08		Qld	K'gari (Fraser Island) to Inskip Point	Coastal	A whaler	Swimming		Male		Other: body not recovered		10
1831	1831-01-22		Tas	Hobart			Clinging to line after boat capsized	Robert Dudlow	Male				
1829			Tas	Pittwater - Sweet Water Point	Estuary - bay to open ocean			"Amphibious Jack"	Male		Major lacerations - leg		4
1791		03:00	NSW	Sydney Harbour	Estuary	Unknown		An Aboriginal woman	Female		Major lacerations - torso; "bitten in two"		1

== See also ==
- List of fatal, unprovoked shark attacks in the United States
- List of fatal shark attacks in California
- List of shark attacks in South Africa
- List of fatal shark attacks in South Africa
- Western Australian shark cull
