= Brenda Hean =

Brenda Hean (1910-1972) was a member of the Lake Pedder Action Committee (LPAC) and a resident of Hobart, Tasmania who disappeared at the time of the flooding of Lake Pedder.

== Background ==
Brenda Hean, born in the UK, was a concert pianist, church organist and leader of the Arts Club of Hobart and member of the Hobart Walking Club. She was a deeply committed Christian.

== Activism ==
Hean was one of the early campaigners against the flooding of Lake Pedder in the Tasmanian Wilderness. "The real driving force behind the LPAC was Brenda Hean...she always raised Lake Pedder, and they said 'It's nothing to do with us.' But she said 'Yes it is, because it's your conscience."

"She sat upon a block of quartzite which had been etched by the weather and was ornamented by a patchwork of moss and lichen. Her chin was thrust defiantly forward. As she gazed across the lake she seemed to become one with it, and both of them seemed to become part of something greater."

"She was so disillusioned with her church-her centre was going to the Lake [Lake Pedder], she mounted part of the vigil there on her own. I think that she had come to the conclusion that if she gave her life for Lake Pedder that extreme sacrifice would move people. They'd suddenly say: 'This is not good enough, when such a nice person's life is lost for this.' In her mind I think she had made that decision."

Eric Reece and the Hydro-Electric Commission's disinterest in complaints as to their manner of dealing with opposition to their plans gave the impression that they ran Tasmania without any checks. Hean then decided to run for politics as a member of the United Tasmania Group, the world’s first green party.

She then planned a protest flight to Canberra with Max Price, from Tasmanian Aviation Services, in a WW2 era Tiger Moth to gain support by skywriting 'Save Lake Pedder' above Parliament House. Hean and Price were trying to widen the scope of the opposition in mainland Australia, in a way that the subsequent Franklin Dam protest did some ten years later. Shortly before the flight, however, she received a threatening phone call: 'Mrs Hean, how would you like to go for a swim?'

== Disappearance ==
The plane departed on 8 September 1972 from Cambridge Airport near Hobart. It was due to refuel at Flinders Island but never arrived. No traces or debris were found despite a massive 10-day sea and air search. The focus of the search later shifted as sea currents would take any evidence southeast towards New Zealand.

It was suspected that pro-dam campaigners had broken into the plane's hangar the night before it took off and placed sugar in one of its petrol tanks. Safety items from the plane were later found hidden in the hangar.

== Legacy ==
Hean is the subject of a book and documentary film about her 1972 disappearance, both produced in 2008 by Scott Millwood. The filmmakers also offered a $100,000 reward for any information that led to a solution to the mystery and also opened a telephone hotline.

The Lake Pedder Restoration Committee often cites Hean’s activism and continues to agitate for the draining of the lake to pre-1972 levels.
