= Kutikina Cave =

Rock shelter in Tasmania, Australia

- Fraser Cave
- location in Australia Kutikina Cave (Australia)
- 42°31′42″S 145°46′8.4″E
- Location: South West Wilderness
- Region: Tasmania, Australia

Site notes
- Excavation dates: 1980s
- Archaeologists: Don Ranson and Rhys Jones

Kutikina Cave (or Kuti Kina or Fraser Cave) is a rock shelter located on the Franklin River in the South West Wilderness, a World Heritage Area in the Australian state of Tasmania.

Originally referred to as Fraser Cave, it was important in the establishment of the antiquity and range of Aboriginal occupation in Tasmania during the Pleistocene.

== Archaeological results ==
The cave was discovered in 1977 by geomorphology student Kevin Keirnan and investigated by a team led by archeologists Don Ranson and Rhys Jones in the 1980s. Excavations were undertaken in 1981 by Jones and Kiernan at the height of the protests over the proposed Franklin Dam construction. The cave has important archaeological deposits relating to human occupation in the Pleistocene, with evidence of wallaby hunting at a time the landscape was an open tundra and it was the most southerly human occupation in the world during the last ice age. The archaeological evidence showed that this was one of the richest artefact deposits ever found, in Tasmania and in Australia. over 250,000 fragments of bone and 75,000 stone artefacts were recovered from a relatively small excavation area comprising only 1% of the artefact-bearing deposit in the cave. The bone fragments were predominantly Bennets Wallaby long bones which had been split along their length to extract the marrow.

== Politics and conservation ==
Kutikina played an important role in the Franklin Dam controversy. It was initially named "Fraser Cave" by Kieran, after Prime Minister, Malcolm Fraser, with the aim of drawing attention to the significance of the Tasmanian wilderness and Franklin River, which were under threat from a dam proposed by Hydro Tasmania.

== See also ==
- Cloggs Cave
- Buchan Caves
- New Guinea II cave
