= Great Australian Bight Marine National Park =

Marine protected area of South Australia

- IUCN category II (national park)
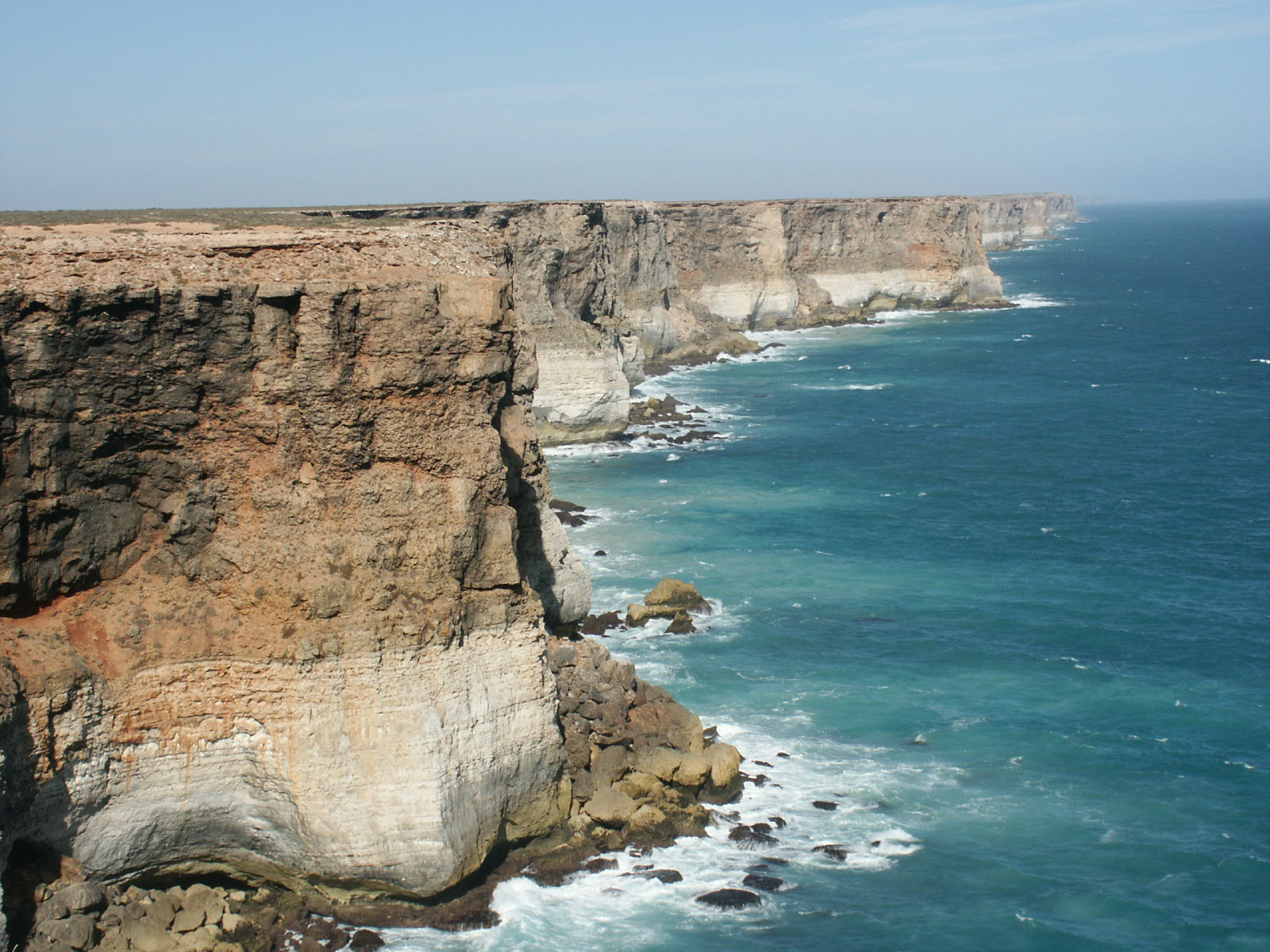
- Coastline typical of that which adjoins the Great Australian Bight Marine National Park

- Location within South Australia
- Location: South Australia
- Nearest city: Ceduna
- Coordinates: 31°37′40″S 131°44′48″E
- Area: 1,233.22 km^{2} (476.15 sq mi)
- Established: 26 September 1996
- Governing body: Department for Environment and Water

Great Australian Bight Marine National Park is a marine protected area in the Australian state of South Australia located 918 km (570 mi) west of the state capital of Adelaide.

It consists of two sections occupying the ocean immediately adjoining the coastline up to a distance of 3 nautical miles (5.6 km; 3.5 mi) and extending from the Western Australia border in the west to a place known as the Tchalingaby Sandhills in the east. The gap between the two sections is also a protected area known as the Great Australian Bight Marine Park Whale Sanctuary which was proclaimed on 22 June 1995 under the Fisheries Act 1982 (SA). The national park is also part of the group of marine protected areas which are located together in waters within Australian and South Australian jurisdictions within the Great Australian Bight and which is collectively known as the Great Australian Bight Marine Park.

The national park was proclaimed under the National Parks and Wildlife Act 1972 (SA) by the South Australian Government on 26 September 1996 principally to protect the calving waters of the Southern right whale and the Australian sea lion populations. On 5 February 2004, rights under the state's Mining Act 1971 and the Petroleum Act 1940 and under the Commonwealth statute, the Petroleum (Submerged Lands) Act 1982, for "entry, prospecting, exploration or mining" existing under the original proclamation were removed. Since late 2012, the national park and the whale sanctuary have also been within the boundaries of the Far West Coast Marine Park.

The national park is classified as an IUCN category II protected area.

== See also ==
- Great Australian Bight Marine Park (2017)
- Great Australian Bight Marine Park (Commonwealth waters)
