= Head of the Bight =

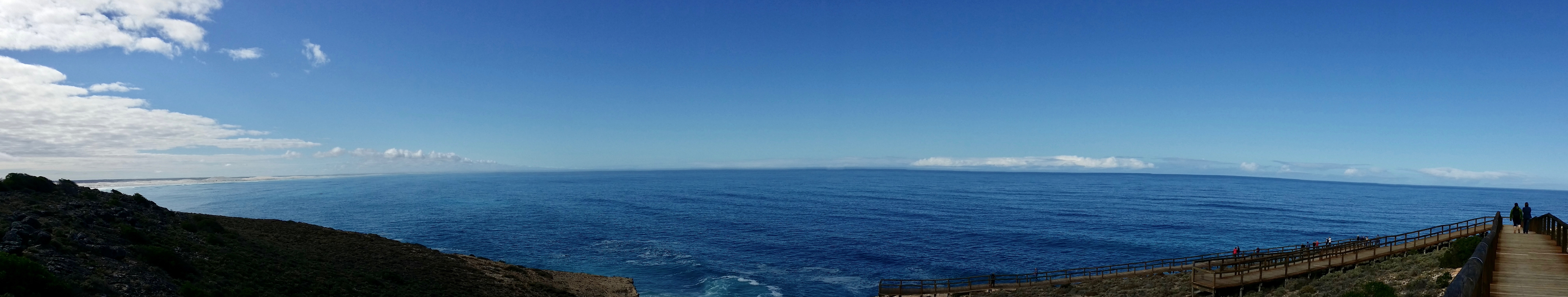
- A panorama of Head of the Bight

- Location in South Australia
- Location: South Australia
- Coordinates: 31°29′36.9018″S 131°9′30.8586″E
- Type: Bay
- Basin countries: Australia

Head of the Bight (also called Head of Bight) is a bay located in South Australia at the most northern extent of the Great Australian Bight.

== Flora and fauna ==
=== Southern right whale ===
It is one of two locations on Australia's south coast where southern right whales come to calve during their winter migration, the other being located off of Point Anne in Western Australia's Fitzgerald River National Park.

== Protected area status ==
The waters within the Head of the Bight are located within the Far West Coast Marine Park. The land around Head of the Bight is part of Yalata Indigenous Protected Area.

== See also ==
- Whale watching in Australia
