= Members of the Tasmanian House of Assembly, 1976–1979 =

This is a list of members of the Tasmanian House of Assembly between the 11 December 1976 election and the 28 July 1979 election.

Name	Party	Electorate	Years in office
Dr Julian Amos	Labor	Denison	1976–1986, 1992–1996
Terry Aulich	Labor	Wilmot	1976–1982
Bob Baker	Liberal	Denison	1969–1980
Hon Darrel Baldock	Labor	Wilmot	1972–1987
Hon Eric Barnard	Labor	Franklin	1959–1979
Hon Michael Barnard	Labor	Bass	1969–1986
Hon Neil Batt	Labor	Denison	1969–1980; 1986–1989
Bill Beattie	Liberal	Bass	1946–1950; 1954–1979
John Beattie	Liberal	Franklin	1972–1989
Hon Max Bingham	Liberal	Denison	1969–1984
Ray Bonney	Liberal	Braddon	1972–1986
Ian Braid	Liberal	Wilmot	1969–1972; 1975–1995
Max Bushby	Liberal	Bass	1961–1986
Hon Geoff Chisholm	Labor	Braddon	1964–1979
Ron Cornish	Liberal	Braddon	1976–1998
John Coughlan	Labor	Braddon	1975–1986
Glen Davies	Labor	Braddon	1972–1986
Michael Field	Labor	Braddon	1976–1997
Steve Gilmour	Liberal	Franklin	1976–1979
Robin Gray	Liberal	Wilmot	1976–1995
John Green	Labor	Denison	1974–1980
Roger Groom	Liberal	Braddon	1976–1997
Hon Harry Holgate	Labor	Bass	1974–1992
Gill James	Labor	Bass	1976–1989, 1992–2002
Hon Andrew Lohrey	Labor	Wilmot	1972–1986
Hon Doug Lowe	Labor	Franklin	1969–1986
Robert Mather	Liberal	Denison	1964–1982
Bill McKinnon^{[1]}	Labor	Franklin	1977–1979, 1979–1986
Jim Mooney	Liberal	Bass	1976–1979
Hon Bill Neilson^{[1]}	Labor	Franklin	1946–1977
Graeme Page	Liberal	Wilmot	1976–1996
Geoff Pearsall	Liberal	Franklin	1969–1988
Hon Michael Polley	Labor	Wilmot	1972–2014
Max Robinson	Liberal	Denison	1976–1979
Neil Robson	Liberal	Bass	1976–1992
Ray Sherry	Labor	Franklin	1976–1979

== Notes ==
^{1} Labor MHA for Franklin and Premier of Tasmania, Bill Neilson, resigned from cabinet and from Parliament on 1 December 1977. Bill McKinnon was elected as his replacement at a recount on 12 December 1977.

== Sources ==
- Parliament of Tasmania (2006). The Parliament of Tasmania from 1856
