= Richard Jones (Tasmanian politician) =

Australian politician

Richard Jones (1936 – 1986) was one of the co-founders of the United Tasmania Group (UTG), the world's first Green party and the predecessor of the Tasmanian Greens. He was the UTG's first president when it formed in March 1972, through to the middle 1970s. At the time Jones was an academic biologist working at the University of Tasmania. He helped form the Centre for Environmental Studies Unit at the University of Tasmania and was active in transforming the Australian Conservation Foundation from an apolitical to a political force.
