= Don Ranson =

Australian archaeologist

Don Ranson is an Australian archaeologist who played an important role in the discovery and recognition of the antiquity of Aboriginal archaeology in Tasmania.

This discovery has been documented in many subsequent histories of Tasmanian Archaeology, including that dedicated to the expedition itself, as well as video documentaries of the find.

== Biography ==
Ranson was born in Sheffield, England, subsequently migrating to Australia and undertaking his PhD fieldwork in 1978 on the excavation of one hut depression in a cluster of three at Sundown Point, Tasmania.

Ranson was one of the people credited with the discovery of Fraser Cave (later renamed Kutikina Cave), with Rhys Jones in Tasmania's West Coast, which established the Pleistocene occupation of the Tasmanian highlands.

In the 1990s he was senior archaeologist with the Department of Parks, Wildlife and Heritage Tasmania. He has most recently been with the Aboriginal Heritage Office, in the Cultural Heritage Branch, DPIWE, Tasmania.

Ranson was also a pioneer of the application of remote sensing techniques for the discovery of archaeological sites in Australia, one example being applied to the Aboriginal burials at Wybellina.

== Selected publications ==
- A preliminary examination of prehistoric coastal settlement at Nelson Bay, West coast of Tasmania 1978–09
- New evidence from Fraser Cave for glacial age man in south-west Tasmania, Nature 1983.
- A teacher's guide to archaeology. Smith, Andrew & Ranson, Don & Morrison, Richard & Tasmania. Department of Lands, Parks and Wildlife (1987).
