= Lake Pedder Action Committee =

Group against the flooding of Lake Pedder in Tasmania, Australia

The Lake Pedder Action Committee (also known as the Lake Pedder Action Group) was a Tasmanian environmental group.

== 1967 ==
An earlier format was the Save Lake Pedder National Park Committee in 1967.

In the early 1970s the state government of Tasmania, led by Eric Reece and its energy agency the Hydro-Electric Commission, planned to dam the upper Gordon River and subsequently flood and enlarge Lake Pedder in South West Tasmania. The committee was active in publications arguing for the preservation of Lake Pedder

== 1971 ==
The Pedder Pilgrimage committee began in 1971.

The LPAC was formed after a public meeting which was called by the Hobart Walking Club following the first weekend in March 1971 when approximately one thousand or more people visited Lake Pedder. This became known as the Pedder Pilgrimage.

The origins of the United Tasmania Group were from a LPAC meeting, and from the South West Tasmania Action Committee, also known as the South West Tasmania Action Group.

== 1972 ==
There were a number of notable Tasmanians who objected to the flooding, including Brenda Hean who died mysteriously in 1972 while being flown to Canberra in a light plane to stage a protest event.

In 1972, the organisation collaborated with mainland state branches to argue against the damming. Activists also conducted vigils at the lake site and other locations in relation to the flooding of the original Lake Pedder

== 1976 ==
In 1976, the people and organisations that made up the South West Tasmania Action Committee evolved into what became the Tasmanian Wilderness Society.

It was instrumental in the successful challenge to the Franklin Dam proposal in the early 1980s.

Since the early 1990s, the Lake Pedder Restoration Committee (LPRC) has continued to press for the restoration of Lake Pedder to its original form. Many of the senior members of the LPRC had also been active in the Lake Pedder Action Committee.

Since the mid-1990s, various books and documentaries have revisited the flooding of Lake Pedder, and people involved in the arguments for and against the flooding.

== Records ==
A significant number of individuals have left archives and resources that include information about the LPAC and its activities:

- Graham, Stuart; Willis, Rob, 1944- (Interviewer); Harpley, John, 1948- (Interviewer) (2005), Stuart Graham interviewed by Rob Willis in the Rob Willis folklore collection
- Lake, P. S. (Philip Spencer) (1970), Papers of Sam Lake, 1970-2014
- Bayly, I. A. E. (Ian Albert Edgar) (1965), Papers of I.A.E. Bayly, 1965-1984
- Missen, Alan (1940), Papers of Alan Missen, 1940-1986

== See also ==
- Franklin Dam controversy
- South West Tasmania Action Committee
