= Kevin Kiernan (geomorphologist) =

Tasmanian writer, retired academic, geomorphologist, and conservationist

- Occupations: Writer, Geomorphologist, Conservationist
- Organization(s): United Tasmania Group, Tasmanian Wilderness Society

Kevin Kiernan is an Australian writer, geomorphologist, and conservationist.

He has written about the West Coast Range and Mount Field National Park of Tasmania.

His honours thesis at the University of Tasmania was about glaciation in Western Tasmania. His subsequent 1985 Phd thesis was concerned with glaciation in Central Tasmania.

In the 1980s he was involved in researching indigenous sites in caves in the South West of Tasmania, including Kutikina Cave

He was involved in various overviews of karst - cave environments of Tasmania, and other states of Australia. He was an academic geomorphologist at the University of Tasmania. He has written and co-authored about conservation of glacial landforms.

He was one of the individuals present at the change of the focus of the former South West Tasmania Action Committee that led to the founding of the Tasmanian Wilderness Society in 1976, and was the first director.
