= Great Australian Bight Marine Park =

- Coordinates: 31°36′53″S 130°07′23.9″E
- Country: Australia
- State: Australia

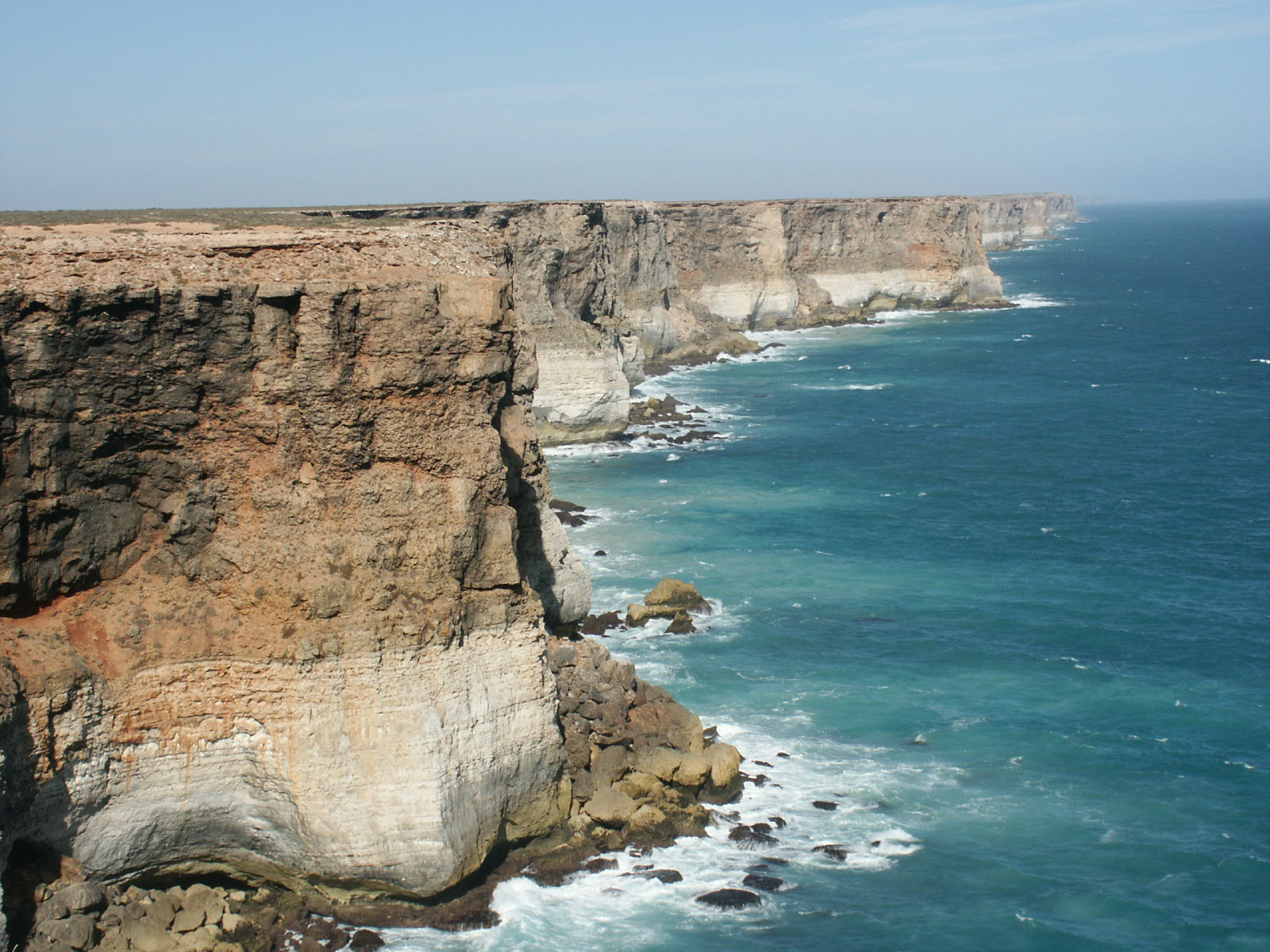
Great Australian Bight Marine Park, South Australia

Great Australian Bight Marine Park is the name given to a group of marine protected areas which are located together within both Australian and South Australian jurisdictions in the Great Australian Bight and which has been in use as recently as 2005. The constituent protected areas are the Great Australian Bight Marine National Park and the Great Australian Bight Marine Park Whale Sanctuary within the coastal waters of South Australia, and the Great Australian Bight Commonwealth Marine Reserve in waters within the Australian Exclusive economic zone. It was listed on the now-defunct Register of the National Estate.

== See also ==
- Great Australian Bight Marine Park (Commonwealth waters)
