= South West Tasmania Action Committee =

Environmental group that preceded the Tasmanian Wilderness Society

South West Tasmania Action Committee was a group started after the flooding of the lake in South West Tasmania known as Lake Pedder to create the Gordon Dam catchment.

It developed into an Australia wide organisation.

In 1976 it evolved into the Tasmanian Wilderness Society.

In Tasmania, the small, informal South-West Action Committee that formed in Hobart in 1974 (after the flooding of Lake Pedder and out of the Lake Pedder Action Committee) was the forerunner of The Wilderness Society (1976) ... In June 1976 members of the South-West Action Committee met at Liffey and decided to rev up this radical grassroots organisation. A follow-up meeting in Hobart in August saw the formalisation of a new organisation, the Tasmanian Wilderness Society (TWS), with Kevin Kiernan as Director

Despite its short life, the committee and organisation was capable of increasing interest in resource and environmental management in Tasmania before the rise of the stages of the Tasmanian Wilderness Society. Also parallel memberships in the United Tasmania Group and other environmental groups provided networking and linkages into the Tasmanian political system that had been hindered in the past by the traditional party alignments.

An earlier committee by the name South-West Committee had been formed in 1962 regarding the south west of Tasmania, however it was not specifically an activist committee.
