= Steve Gilmour (politician) =

Australian politician (born 1943)

Stephen Bernard "Steve" Gilmour (born 15 June 1943) is an English-born Australian former politician.

He was born in Morecambe in Lancashire. In 1976 he was elected to the Tasmanian House of Assembly as a Liberal member for Franklin. He served until his defeat in 1979.
