= Great Australian Bight =

Open bay off southern Australia

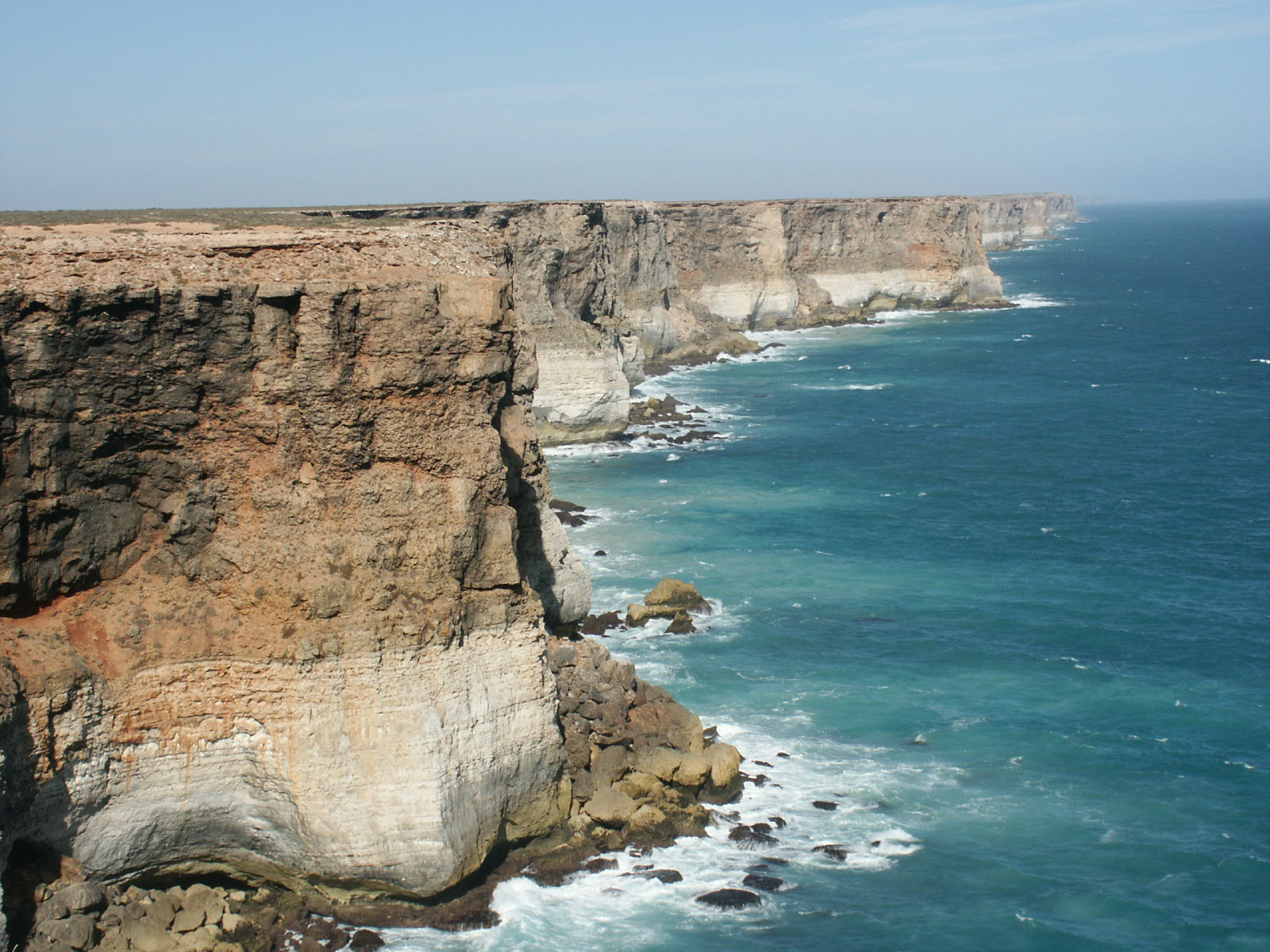
- Coastline of the Great Australian Bight, located near Ceduna, South Australia

- Location in Australia

- Limits of the Great Australian Bight (in green as defined by the Australian Hydrographic Service, in red by the International Hydrographic Organization).
- Location: South Australia, Western Australia (following AHS definition, includes Tasmania, Victoria if following IHO definition)
- Coordinates: 33°S 130°E
- Type: Oceanic bight
- Primary outflows: Indian Ocean (in Australia, considered part of the Southern Ocean)
- Basin countries: Australia
- Surface area: 45,926 km^{2} (17,732 sq mi)

The Great Australian Bight is a large oceanic bight (open gulf) off the central and western portions of the southern coastline of mainland Australia.

There are two definitions for its extent—one by the International Hydrographic Organization (IHO) and another by the Australian Hydrographic Service (AHS). The bight is generally considered part of the Indian Ocean, although the AHS classifies it as part of the Southern Ocean. Its coastline is characterized by cliff faces and rocky capes, making it an ideal location for whale-watching.

This oceanic feature was encountered by European explorers in 1627, and was later accurately charted by English navigator Matthew Flinders in 1802. The Great Australian Bight came into existence about 50 million years ago when the supercontinent Gondwana broke apart, separating Antarctica from Australia.

The Bight's waters are highly biodiverse, especially in zooplankton, due to specific ocean currents. However, more research is needed to fully understand the region's complex ecosystems and the potential impacts of human activities, such as resource extraction. Southern bluefin tuna are a popular fishing target in the Bight, and there have been attempts to explore the area for oil and gas since the 1960s. However, these proposals have faced significant opposition due to the potential environmental impacts.

== Extent ==
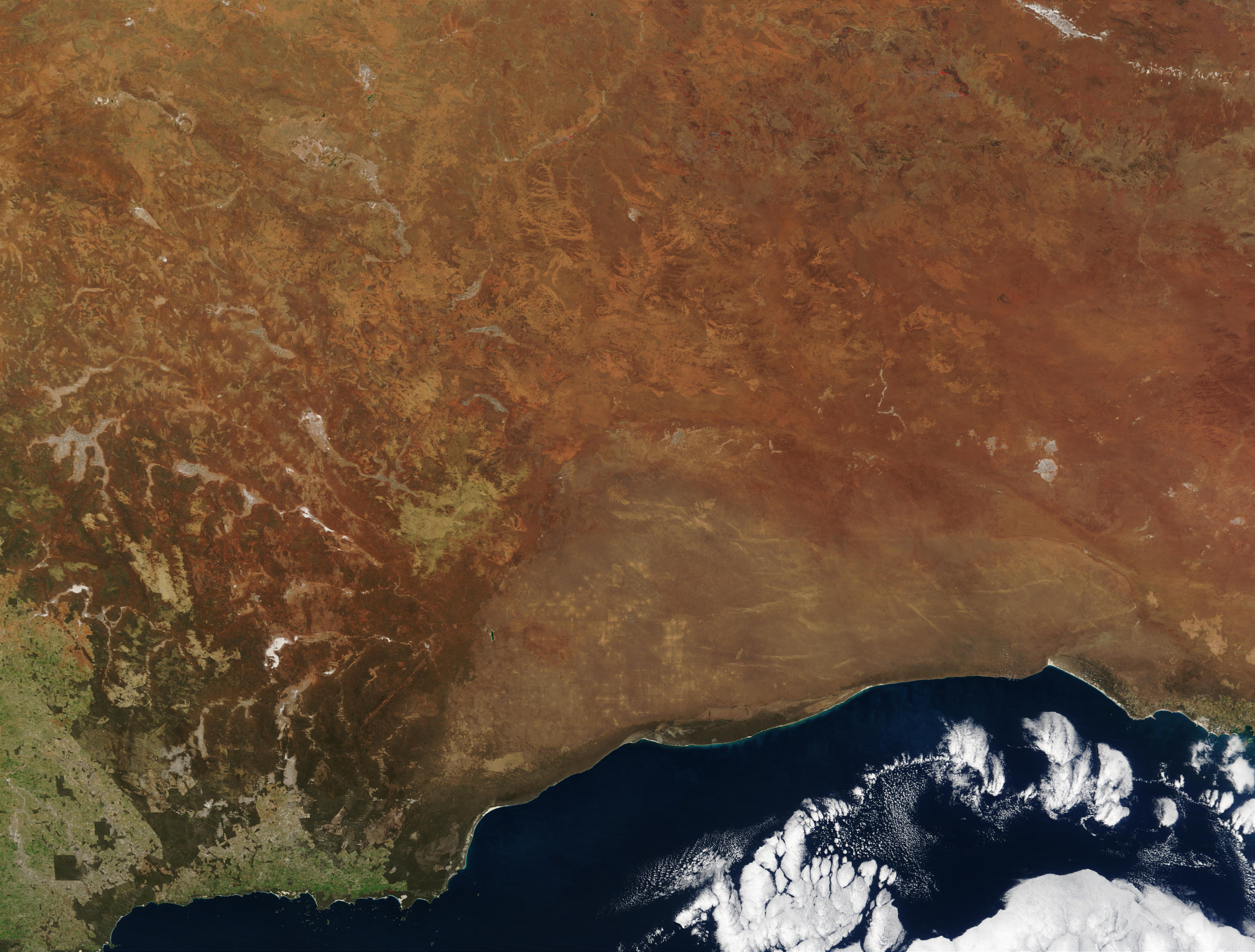
The Great Australian Bight south of the Nullarbor Plain. Credit Jacques Descloitres, Visible Earth, NASA.

Two definitions of the extent are in use – one used by the International Hydrographic Organization (IHO) and the other used by the Australian Hydrographic Service (AHS).

The IHO defines the Great Australian Bight as having the following limits:

On the North. The south coast of the Australian mainland.

On the South. A line joining West Cape Howe (35°08′S 117°37′E) Australia to South West Cape, Tasmania.

On the East. A line from Cape Otway, Victoria to King Island and thence to Cape Grim, the northwest extreme of Tasmania.

The AHS defines the bight with a smaller area, from Cape Pasley, Western Australia, to Cape Carnot, South Australia – a distance of 1,160 kilometres (720 mi).

Much of the bight lies due south of the expansive Nullarbor Plain, which straddles South Australia and Western Australia. The Eyre Highway passes close to the cliffs of the bight between the Head of the Bight and Eucla.

Outside of Australia, the Great Australian Bight is generally considered part of the Indian Ocean. The AHS considers it to be part of the Southern Ocean, using the expanded Australian definition used for this ocean. The IHO in its Limits of Oceans and Seas (both the currently in-force 1953 edition and the 2002 never-approved draft) includes the bight with the Indian Ocean, while Bass Strait and the Tasman Sea are included by IHO with the South Pacific Ocean in the 2002 draft. In the 1953 edition, IHO includes Bass Strait as part of the Indian Ocean.

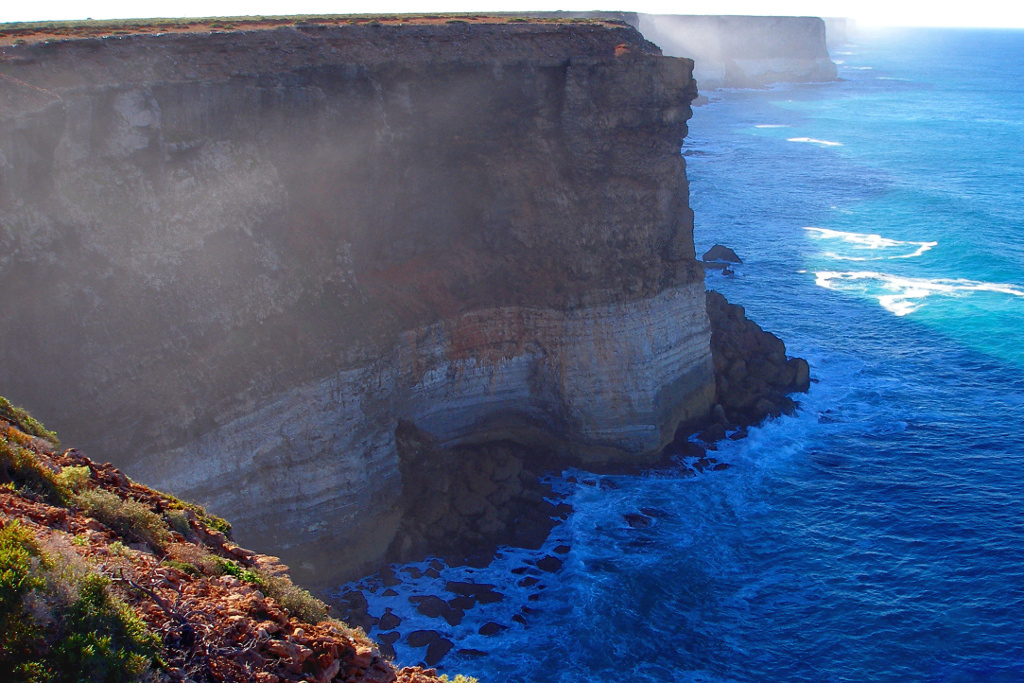
Great Australian Bight Marine Park, 2007

== Coastline ==
The area around Cape Pasley is an eastern outcrop of the ancient crystalline rocks of the Yilgarn craton. From there the coast curves north-eastwards, with an escarpment parallel to the coast. The Israelite Plain lies between the escarpment, here called the Wylie Scarp, and the shore, with a chain of coastal lagoons behind coastal dunes. As the coast turns eastwards the escarpment meets the shore, creating the Baxter Cliffs which extend for 200 km (120 mi). Near Cocklebiddy the escarpment curves inland again. Here the Roe Plains extends for about 300 km (190 mi) along the coast, reaching about 35 km (22 mi) inland at their widest point. There are extensive dunefields near the shore, some bare of vegetation, and others stabilized by coastal strand vegetation, shrubland, and mallee woodland. Near Eucla and the Western Australia–South Australia border the escarpment reaches the coast again, and the Bunda Cliffs or Nullarbor Cliffs extend for 220 km (140 mi) to Head of the Bight.

At Head of the Bight the escarpment turns inland to the northeast. The coastline of the western Eyre Peninsula is characterised by rocky capes, bays, and islands, including Fowlers Bay, Smoky Bay, Streaky Bay, and the Nuyts Archipelago. The coastline is formed from aeolianite limestone. Waves and currents have formed beaches and dunes from eroded aeolianite sand. The southern Eyre peninsula is an outcrop of the granitic Gawler craton.

== History and exploration ==
The Great Australian Bight was encountered by European explorers in 1627 when Dutch navigator François Thijssen sailed along its western margins. The coast was later first accurately charted by the English navigator Matthew Flinders in 1802, during his circumnavigation of the Australian continent. A later land-based survey was accomplished by the English explorer Edward John Eyre.

== Natural history ==
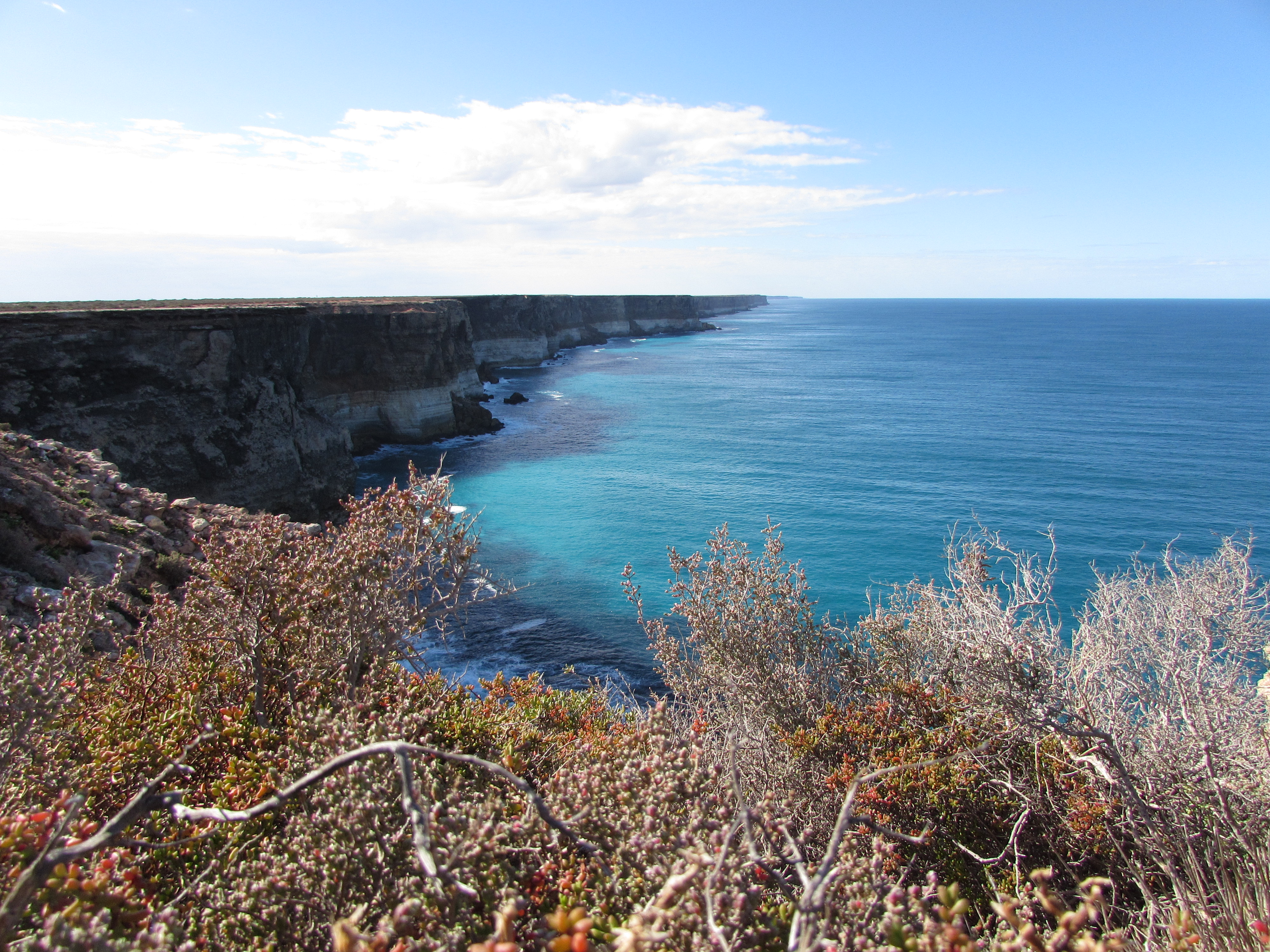
Great Australian Bight 2015

The bight came into existence when Gondwana, along what is now Wilkes Land and Terre Adélie, broke apart and separated Antarctica from Australia around 50 million years ago.

The coastline of the Great Australian Bight is characterised by cliff faces (up to 60 metres or 200 feet high), surfing beaches and rock platforms, ideal for whale-watching. This is a popular activity during the southern hemisphere winter, when increasing numbers of southern right whales migrate to the region from their summer feeding grounds in the Antarctic. The whales come to the Bight region, especially to the Head of Bight, to calve and breed, and do not feed until they return to the Antarctic. Their numbers were severely depleted by whaling, particularly during the 19th century, but have since recovered to some extent.

The Nullarbor Plain, which borders much of the length of the Bight's coastline, is a former seabed, uplifted during the Miocene. Consisting of limestone, it is very flat, and has an arid or semi-arid climate with very little rainfall, and high summer temperatures and high evaporation rates. It has no surface drainage, but has a karst drainage system through cave formation in the underlying limestone. North of the Nullarbor lies the Great Victoria Desert, which has an internal drainage system terminating in numerous small salt lakes.

The lack of surface runoff and terrestrial nutrients results in the relatively shallow waters of the Great Australian Bight being generally low in nutrients, and therefore oligotrophic, compared with many other continental shelves which support major fisheries. Seasonal upwelling of deep ocean water along the coast of the Eyre Peninsula in the eastern part of the Bight brings nutrients to the surface waters, with the resulting fertility creating an important marine hotspot.

The waters of the Great Australian Bight are highly biodiverse, particularly in zooplankton, due to a particular series of ocean currents. A literature review undertaken by SARDI (South Australian Research and Development Institute) on the Benthic Protection Zone of the Great Australian Bight Marine Park in 2003 states: "Upwelling events during summer and autumn produce cool patches of surface water along the coast of the southern Eyre Peninsula. These patches contain elevated nutrient concentrations and support enhanced levels of primary productivity. High densities of zooplankton to the northwest of the patches indicate that the prevailing southeasterly winds transport the products of this enhanced biological production into the central GAB. These plankton communities support the highest densities of small planktivorous fishes, including sardine and anchovy, in Australian waters. Juvenile southern bluefin tuna (SBT) migrate into the GAB annually to feed on these rich pelagic resources." As the nutrients are swept up from the deep water ocean floor and pushed in towards the coast, the food chain is injected with a massive influx of the bottom rung.

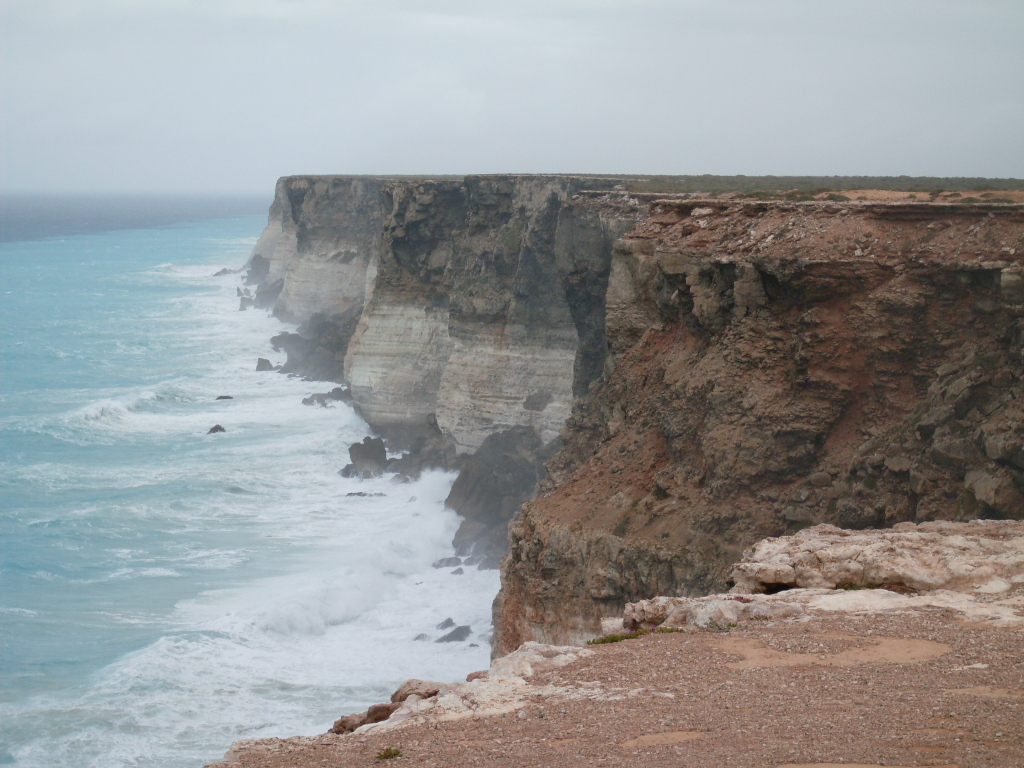
Cliff overlooking Commonwealth Marine Reserve

There is not enough known about the full scope of species that dwell in or migrate to the Great Australian Bight, so more studies are required. "The Interim Marine and Coastal Regionalisation of Australia (IMCRA) classification suggests that high biodiversity in the GAB may be explained by the presence of temperate species with eastern and western affinities, as well as “tropical stragglers” from northern regions. However, patterns of diversity vary between taxa. Mangroves are poorly represented due to the lack of estuaries. Seagrasses are confined mainly to sheltered bays and the lees of reefs and islands due to the frequent disturbance of inshore habitats by large swells. In contrast, the macroalgal assemblage of the GAB is one of the world's most diverse and includes >1200 species. Over 90% of species in most invertebrate groups are endemic to southern Australia, but the proportion that is confined to the GAB is unknown."

There is still much research needed to fully understand the complex ecosystems of the Great Australian Bight and how any resource extraction or other human activity may affect them. The Literature review also states: "Approximately 370 of the 600 fish species that occur in southern Australia have been recorded in SA. Several species, including the coastal stingaree (Urolophus orarius) and crested threefin (Trinorfolkia cristata), are restricted to South Australia and occur in the GAB. The patterns of distribution and abundance of fishes in the GAB are poorly understood."

There are some clear findings from the review, "The GAB provides critical habitat for two species of marine mammals that are recognised internationally as being priorities for conservation. The southern right whale (Eubalaena australis), which is listed as ‘endangered’ under the Commonwealth Environment Protection and Biodiversity Conservation Act 1999, breeds at the Head of Bight during winter. The Australian sea lion (Neophoca cinerea), which is endemic to Australia and is currently listed as “near threatened”, breeds in small colonies along the cliffs of the GAB." These marine mammals require this habitat to remain in existence, which has been recognised by Australian law.

One location on the bight that is specifically oriented towards the understanding of the natural history on its coastline is the Eyre Bird Observatory.

== Current conditions ==
Economically, the Bight has been exploited over many years as part of the fishing, whaling and shellfish industries. Southern bluefin tuna have been a favoured target of fishing in the Bight.

Exploration for oil and gas in the Great Australian Bight first began in the late 1960s. Several oil majors — BP, Statoil/Equinor, and Chevron — proposed plans to drill exploration wells in the southern part of the area from 2017 onwards. On 11 October 2016, BP withdrew its plans to explore the area stating that it was not competitive and did not align with BP's strategic goals. The proposal to explore in the bight was the focus of community opposition. The Wilderness Society showed that a worst-case scenario leak of oil could have a catastrophic effect on the southern coastline of Australia. The Australian Senate commenced an inquiry into oil or gas production in the Great Australian Bight on 22 February 2016. The committee was reestablished on 13 September 2016 following the Australian Federal Election. In October 2017, Chevron withdrew from the project, but it returned alongside BP in 2019. Though the National Offshore Petroleum Safety and Environmental Management Authority approved exploration plans in late 2019, Equinor withdrew from the project in February 2020, citing profitability reasons.

The settlements existing along the coastline of the bight, such as Ceduna and Eucla have facilities to access the bight. Some other locations on the Eyre Highway or located on the Nullarbor do not have facilities or easy access.

== See also ==
- Great Australian Bight Marine National Park
- Great Australian Bight Marine Park
- Great Australian Bight Marine Park (2017)
- Great Australian Bight Marine Park (Commonwealth waters)
- Great Australian Bight Marine Park Whale Sanctuary
- Great South Australian Coastal Upwelling System
- Great Southern Reef
- Western Australia–South Australia Border
- Great Australian Bight High
