= Tasmanian Wilderness Society =

Environmental group in Australia

The Tasmanian Wilderness Society was a Tasmanian environmental group that started in 1976 in response to a proposal by the state's Hydro Electric Commission to construct a dam on the Gordon River, downstream from the Franklin River, that led to the Franklin Dam controversy. The group evolved from membership of the South West Tasmania Action Committee and members of the United Tasmania Group. It was active in public protest about the issues of Wilderness, the Franklin River and South West Tasmania.

After the Franklin Dam campaign the group changed its name in 1983 to The Wilderness Society (Australia).
