= Far West Coast Marine Park =

Marine park in Australia

Coordinates: 31°36′S 130°26′E

- Location: South Australia, Australia
- Nearest city: Adelaide (about 900 km away)
- Governing body: National Parks and Wildlife Service South Australia

Far West Coast Marine Park is a marine park in South Australia. The park is within state waters, about 900 kilometres (560 mi) from the state capital of Adelaide.

The land around Far West Coast Marine Park is very much flat, bordered by the Nullarbor Plain to the north. The south of the park is bordered by the Great Australian Bight Marine Park.

The climate is a cool climate. The average temperature is 18°C. The warmest month is December, at 24°C, and the coldest July, at 12°C. The average rainfall is 397 millimetres per year. The wettest month is June, with 76 millimetres of rain, and the wettest October, with 2 millimetres.

The Far West Coast Marine Park is home to numerous marine life, with sea lions, by far the most well-known one.
