= Great Australian Bight Marine Park (Commonwealth waters) =

Former marine protected area in the Great Australian Bight

- IUCN category VI (protected area with sustainable use of natural resources)
- Interactive map of Great Australian Bight Marine Park (Commonwealth waters)
- Location: Australia
- Nearest city: Ceduna
- Coordinates: 33°17′39″S 130°38′23″E
- Area: 19,769 km^{2} (7,633 sq mi)
- Established: 22 April 1998
- Governing body: Department of the Environment

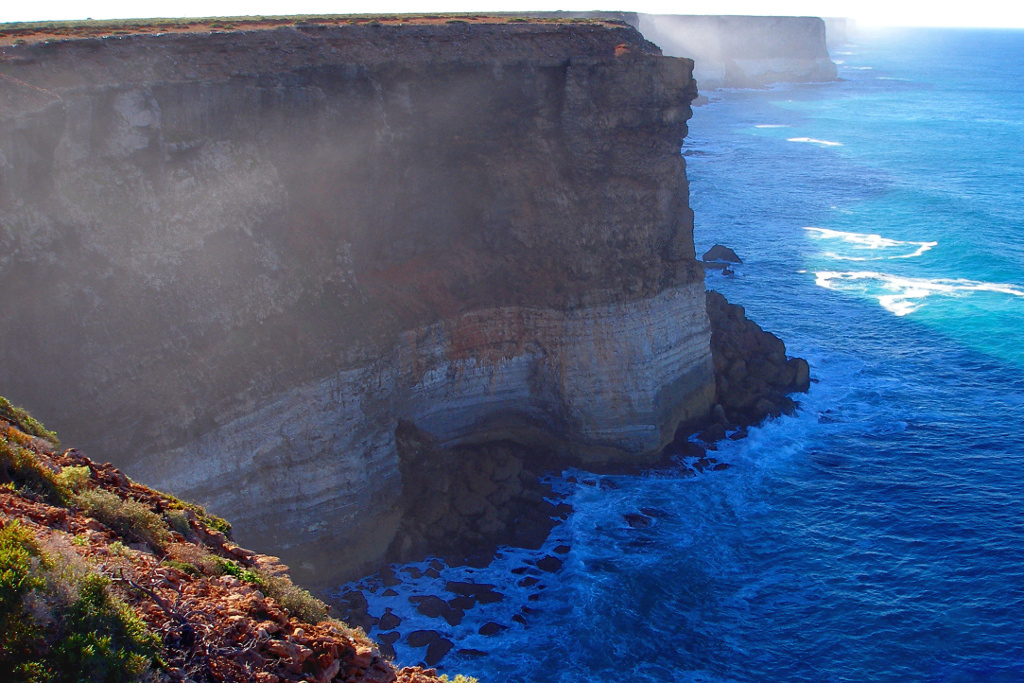

Great Australian Bight Marine Park (Commonwealth Waters) is a former marine protected area located in the Great Australian Bight immediately south of South Australia and its immediate onshore waters. On 8 November 2012, it was replaced by a new protected area known as the Great Australian Bight Commonwealth Marine Reserve.

== See also ==
- Protected areas of Australia
- Great Australian Bight Marine National Park
