= Great Australian Bight Marine Park (2017) =

Marine protected area in the Great Australian Bight off South Australia

- Interactive map of Great Australian Bight Marine Park
- Location: Australia
- Nearest city: Ceduna, South Australia
- Coordinates: 33°24′00″S 130°23′00″E
- Area: 45,926 km^{2} (17,732 sq mi)
- Established: 8 December 2012
- Governing body: Director of National Parks
- Website: Official website

Great Australian Bight Marine Park (formerly Great Australian Bight Commonwealth Marine Reserve) is a marine protected area located in the Great Australian Bight south of South Australia in waters within the Australian Exclusive economic zone.

It was gazetted in November 2012 to replace the Great Australian Bight Marine Park (Commonwealth waters). It was renamed on 11 October 2017.

The marine park consists of three zones - a marine national park zone (IUCN Category II) with an area of 7,728 square kilometres (2,984 square miles), a multiple use zone (IUCN Category VI) with an area of 22,682 square kilometres (8,758 square miles) and a special purpose zone (IUCN Category VI) that occupies three separate areas of ocean with a total area of 15,516 square kilometres (5,991 square miles).

The purpose of the marine park is to protect habitat used for calving by the southern right whale and as a feeding area for the following species - Australian sea lion, sperm whale, short-tailed shearwater and great white shark.

It is part of a group of Australian marine parks known as the South-west Marine Parks Network. It is also part of the group of marine protected areas which are located together in waters within Australian and South Australian jurisdictions within the Great Australian Bight and which were collectively known as the Great Australian Bight Marine Park as recently as 2005.

It lies to the west of the Western Eyre Marine Park.

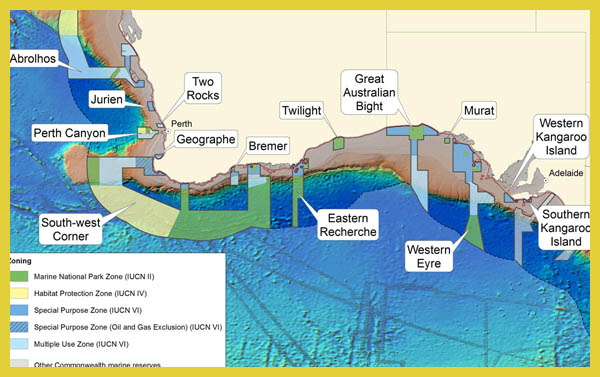
The South-west Corner Marine Reserves Network, including the Great Australian Bight Commonwealth Marine Reserve

== See also ==
- Protected areas of Australia

== Citations and references ==
Citations

References

- "Environment Protection and Biodiversity Conservation (Commonwealth Marine Reserves) Proclamation 2012 - F2012L02188". Commonwealth of Australia, Comlaw.
- Great Australian Bight Marine Park (Commonwealth Waters) Management Plan 2005-2012. Director of National Parks, Commonwealth of Australia. 2005. ISBN 0 642 550794.
- "Great Australian Bight Commonwealth Marine Reserve". Department of the Environment (DoE).
- "Great Australian Bight Commonwealth Marine Reserve - Maps". Department of the Environment (DoE).
