= United Tasmania Group =

- Founded: 23 March 1972
- Ideology: Green politics

The United Tasmania Group (UTG) was an Australian political party based in the state of Tasmania, which is generally acknowledged as the world's first green party to contest elections. The party was formed on 23 March 1972, during a meeting of the Lake Pedder Action Committee (LPAC) at the Hobart Town Hall in order to field political candidates in the April 1972 state election.

== 1970s ==
UTG contested ten state and federal elections between 1972 and 1977, with 46 candidates overall, with the highest vote of 9.9% in the Legislative Council election with Rod Broadby in 1975 (see Appendix 4, UTG Journal Issue No. 6, 2021). At its peak, sometime in 1976-1977 UTG had over 500 members, 17 branches across Tasmania, and 14 Policy Development Committees (see Appendices 1 & 2 in The UTG Journal No. 6, Special 50th anniversary edition).

The United Tasmania Group's first President was Dr Richard Jones and it lasted for five years, but the UTG name was used for the purpose of contesting the 1990 federal election (none of the six candidates were members of UTG). One of the 1970s candidates Bob Brown, went on to form the Tasmanian Greens and then ultimately, at the national level, the Australian Greens.

== 2010s ==
On 2 April 2016 following a meeting, former members of the party re-started the group.

The United Tasmania Group launched The UTG Journal in 2018. The journal is designed to cover a wide range of topics, including the development of conservation and other issues since that original founding date on 23 March 1972. Eleven issues of The UTG Journal have been published since the re-start of the organisation in 2016.

== Histories and analysis ==
In the mid-1990s Lance Armstrong wrote a history of the politics of Tasmania in the 1990s.

In the mid-2000s author Bill Lines also attempted to grapple with the broader scope of politics in Australia relative to greens politics in Patriots. Meanwhile, the 2017 Master's Thesis of Canadian scholar Blake Allen produced an analysis of how the UTG, and their effect on Tasmanian politics, reshaped the Australian federal relationship in a favorable manner for successive national governments. In the late 2010s Paddy Manning researched and wrote a history of the Greens in Australia, and included the UTG in the first chapter, acknowledging the importance of the group within the larger context.

An unpublished Honours Thesis on the party by Pam Walker (University of Tasmania) was written in 1986, and the first chapter in Paddy Manning's book, Inside the Greens (2019), is devoted to the history of the party.

== Publications ==
=== 1970s ===
- United Tasmania Group (1970), Newsletter, United Tasmania Group
- United Tasmania Group (1976), State newsletter, United Tasmania Group
- United Tasmania Group (1977), Alternative : journal of the Group, United Tasmania Group
- United Tasmania Group (issuing body.) (2018), "The UTG journal Issue No. 1", The Utg Journal, [Sandy Bay, Tasmania] United Tasmania Group, ISSN 2208-9497

=== 2000s ===
- The UTG Journal issue No. 1
- The UTG Journal Issue No. 2
- The UTG Journal Issue No. 3
- The UTG Journal Issue No. 4
- The UTG Journal Issue No. 5
- The UNITED TASMANIA GROUP Story Policy Compilation The UTG Journal Issue No. 6 Special 50th year edition
- The UTG Journal Issue No. 7
- The UTG Journal Issue No. 8
- The UTG Journal Issue No. 9

The UTG Journal Issue No. 10, Special Edition - https://www.researchgate.net/publication/386907417_The_UTG_Journal_No_10_Special_Edition

The UTG Journal Issue No. 11, International Edition - /https://www.researchgate.net/publication/395334481_UTG_Journal_Issue_No_11_International_Edition

== See also ==
- List of political parties in Australia
- Living Soil Association of Tasmania
