= Denison River =

River in Tasmania, Australia

Coordinates: 42°43′02″S 145°49′58″E

Denison River is a river in South West Tasmania, Australia. It is within the South West Wilderness, and drains into the Gordon River below the Gordon Splits. Its catchment starts in the south of the King William Range.

It lies to the east of the Prince of Wales Range, north west of Gordon Dam and Lake Gordon, and west of The Spires.

The river was travelled and photographed by Peter Dombrovskis.

In 1989 a survey of the river valley was undertaken to check for Aboriginal sites. Seven archaeological sites were identified.
