= Franklin Dam controversy =

Proposed dam in Tasmania, Australia

- The iconic campaign sticker "No Dams In S-W Tasmania · World Heritage ·" was used to show opposition to the Franklin Dam in the early 1980s
- Date: circa 1978-1981
- Location: Tasmania, Australia
- Type: Political controversy; Challenge of constitutional powers
- Theme: Environmental debate
- Participants: The Wilderness Society (Australia); Tasmanian Conservation Trust; Australian Conservation Foundation; Tasmanian Government; Australian Government
- Outcome: The High Court ruled that the World Heritage (Western Tasmania Wilderness) Regulations (Cth) and the World Heritage Properties Conservation Act, 1983 (Cth) were within constitutional powers, rendering it unlawful for the Hydro-Electric Commission of Tasmania to construct the dam, except with the consent of a Commonwealth Minister.
- Arrests: 1,217
- Litigation: Commonwealth v Tasmania aka "The Tasmanian Dam Case"

The Gordon-below-Franklin Dam (or simply Franklin Dam) project was a proposed dam on the Gordon River in Tasmania, Australia, that was never constructed. The movement that eventually led to the project's cancellation became one of the most significant environmental campaigns in Australian history.

The dam was proposed for the purpose of generating hydroelectricity. The resulting new electricity generation capacity would have been 180 megawatts (240,000 hp). The proposed construction would have subsequently impacted upon the environmentally sensitive Franklin River, which joins with the Gordon river nearby. During the campaign against the dam, both areas were listed on the UNESCO World Heritage Area register.

The campaign that followed led to the consolidation of the small green movement that had been born out of a campaign against the building of three dams on Lake Pedder in the late 1960s and early 1970s. Over the five years between the announcement of the dam proposal in 1978 and the axing of the plans in 1983, there was vigorous debate between the pro- and anti-dam lobbies, with large protests from both sides.

In December 1982, the dam site was occupied by protesters, leading to widespread arrests and greater publicity. The dispute became a federal issue the following March, when a campaign in the national print media, assisted by the pictures of photographer Peter Dombrovskis, helped bring down the government of Malcolm Fraser at the 1983 election. The new government, under Bob Hawke, had promised to stop the dam from being built. A legal battle between the federal government and Tasmanian Government followed, resulting in a landmark High Court ruling in the federal government's favour.

== Announcement of the plans ==
Franklin Dam controversy (Tasmania)

In 1978, the Tasmanian Hydro Electric Commission (HEC) announced intentions to construct the dam. The original proposal was for two dams:

- Gordon below Franklin Dam – 105 m (344 ft) high, located at 42.584°S 145.732°E. This was the lowest point on the river possible for a dam, since the tidal zone extends to 1 kilometre (0.62 mi) further downstream.
- Dam #2 – 200 m (660 ft) high, located at 42.376°S 145.757°E. Accessed by the Mount McCall Track (Franklin River Road).

The idea polarised the Tasmanian community. It gained support from some sections of the community for generating jobs in an area of the state that was struggling economically. It was suggested that the construction of the dam would assist in bringing industry to Tasmania, on top of the jobs that it would create directly. The initial opinion polls showed around 70% support for the dam.

However, the protest movement which had gathered to fight the construction of the Lake Pedder Dam earlier in the 1970s began to reassemble in response to the announcement. The Tasmanian Wilderness Society which had formed from the anti-Lake Pedder Dam and South West Tasmania action groups, the Tasmanian Conservation Trust, and the Australian Conservation Foundation began to mount a public interest campaign concerning the river. The photographs of Dombrovskis and his colleague, Olegas Truchanas, attracted significant attention. The campaign generated 30,000 letters of support in a fortnight. A film, The Last Wild River, was shown on Tasmania's two commercial television stations.

In June 1980, an estimated 10,000 people marched through the streets of Hobart, demanding that the government not proceed with construction. This was the largest rally in the history of the state.

== Attempts at compromise ==
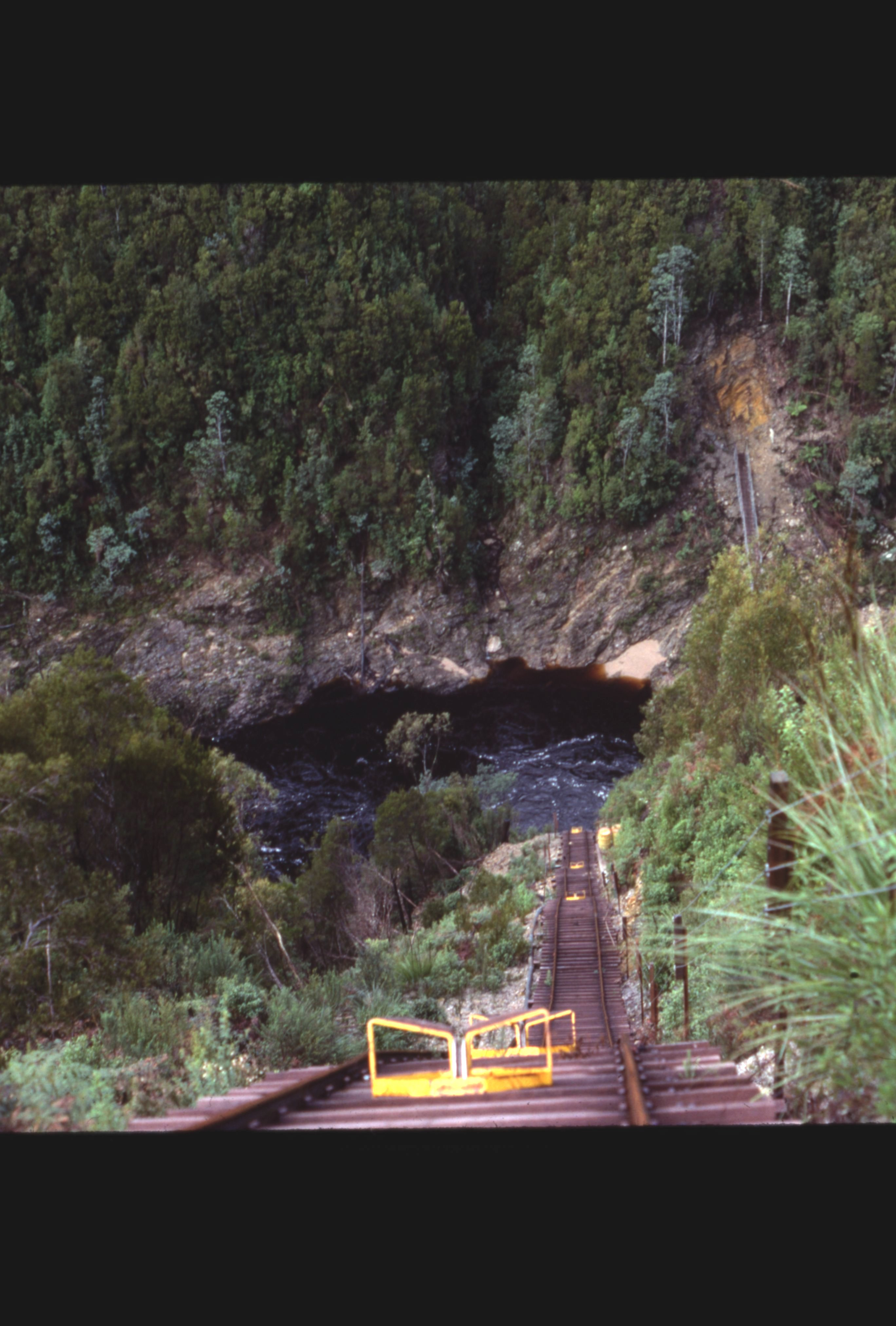
Track to the Franklin river in the 1970s towards the Kelly Basin.

The Labor state government, under premier Doug Lowe, backed down from the original proposal, and agreed to place the Franklin River in a new Wild Rivers National Park. Instead of the original 'Gordon below Franklin' proposal, Lowe now backed an alternative, the 'Gordon above Olga' scheme. While this was above the Gordon's junction with the Franklin, it still would have intruded into wilderness quality areas. This compromise did not appease the environmental groups, who maintained a policy of no dams in southwest Tasmania.

In July, both the pro-dam and anti-dam groups (the former of which also included the union movement) initiated an advertising blitz in Tasmania. The HEC claimed that up to 10,000 potential jobs would be lost if the dam was not built. The conservative-dominated Legislative Council then blocked the Labor government's 'Gordon-above-Olga' compromise, instead insisting that they proceed with the original proposal. The two parties could not agree on a solution, which led to a deadlock between the two houses of parliament.

== Inquiry, referendum, and Tasmanian state election ==
In 1981, Australian Democrats Senator Don Chipp initiated a Senate inquiry into "the natural values of south-west Tasmania to Australia and the world" and "the federal responsibility in assisting Tasmania to preserve its wilderness areas of national and international importance".

From early 1981, archaeologists uncovered evidence of human habitation dating from about 15,000 years before present in caves which would be flooded if the dam were to be built. The most significant cave had been rediscovered by geomorphology student Kevin Kieran in January 1977, and he first named it Fraser Cave after the then prime minister, Malcolm Fraser, because ...we were trying to direct the attention of politicians to the area...'. It was renamed Kutikina in mid-1982, as suggested by the Tasmanian Aboriginal Centre. Kiernan and a group of cavers (speleologists) found over 100 caves in the region.

Concerns also began to be raised about habitat loss for endangered species.

On 12 December 1981, the state government held a referendum, the Power Referendum 1981, in an attempt to break the deadlock. The referendum gave voters only two choices, one for each dam proposal. In rounded figures, 47% voted in favour of the original Gordon below Franklin scheme, 8% for the compromise Gordon above Olga scheme, and 35% voted informally. There had been a significant campaign for voters to write "No Dams" on their ballot papers, and in total more than 33% of voters did this; these were initially all counted in the informal vote, but some were later recounted as formal as they also included a valid vote for one of the two dam options.

The ongoing crisis resulted in the replacement of Lowe as premier by Harry Holgate, a Labor politician who was markedly more supportive of the dam proposals. In response, both Lowe and Mary Willey, another Labor MP, resigned from the party and sat in the parliament as independents. This resulted in the loss of a Labor majority in the lower house. Norm Sanders, an Australian Democrats MP and anti-dam campaigner, moved a no-confidence motion, and a state election was called for 15 May.

In May 1982 the Holgate Labor government was defeated by the strongly pro-dam Liberal Party under Robin Gray. The new premier immediately ordered the original plan to go ahead and passed the necessary legislation. Gray attempted to dissuade the federal government from intervening by threatening to secede from the Commonwealth if they did so. The federal government initially declined to intervene in the dispute.

== The campaigns broadens ==
During 1982, active membership of anti-dam organisations increased a hundredfold in mainland states. The iconic "No Dams" triangle sticker was printed. Rallies and events were held in cities around Australia. Bob Brown toured the country raising support for the anti-dam campaign, attempting to convince Liberal Prime Minister Malcolm Fraser to intervene and override the state legislation allowing the dam's construction. British botanist and TV presenter Professor David Bellamy addressed 5,000 people at a Melbourne rally.

By the end of 1982, any perception that "greenies" equated with hippies had been greatly challenged, for example in Sydney, Bob Brown and Bellamy addressed 500 people at a candle-lit dinner serenaded by string quartet, ABC's classical music radio station featured a "Concert for the Franklin", and electronics entrepreneur Dick Smith committed to civil disobedience. Many people who had not previously considered conservation issues decided that wilderness was a vote-worthy issue, as evidenced by the following ballot paper write-in campaigns.

In the federal Lowe by-election in Sydney, March 1982, volunteers at every polling booth encouraged voters to write "No Dams" on their ballot paper, and 9% did so. At that first 'Write-in' campaign, few people knew that they could write a message on their federal ballot paper without invalidating their vote. In the ACT House of Assembly 1982 election, up to 40% of voters wrote "No Dams" on their ballot paper. In the federal Flinders by-election in Victoria in December 1982, 40% of voters wrote "No Dams" on their ballot papers.

== Blockade ==
The photograph Morning Mist, Rock Island Bend, Franklin River, by Peter Dombrovskis was used by the Tasmanian Wilderness Society in advertising against the dam's construction

In November 1982, the conflict stepped up a notch when Brown announced that a blockade of the dam site would begin on 14 December. On the same day, the UNESCO committee in Paris was due to list the Tasmanian wild rivers as a World Heritage site. The blockade, at "Warners Landing" (42°34′7″S 145°41′24″E) drew an estimated 2,500 people, from not only Tasmania, but also from interstate and overseas. This resulted in the subsequent proclamation of the Tasmanian Wilderness World Heritage Area, which covered both the Franklin and Gordon Rivers. However, Tasmania itself was still divided, with a pro-dam rally in Hobart also attracting around 2,500 people. While the blockade was ongoing, Norm Sanders resigned from the Tasmanian House of Assembly to contest a seat in the Australian Senate. He was replaced in the Assembly by Bob Brown, who had only been released from jail the previous day after spending nineteen days behind bars for his role in the blockade.

Throughout January 1983, around fifty people arrived at the blockade each day. The state government made things difficult for the protesters, passing several laws and enforcing special bail conditions for those arrested. Bulldozers were unloaded at the site from a barge under the protection of police. A total of 1,217 arrests were made, many simply for being present at the blockade. Protesters impeded machinery and occupied sites associated with the construction work. Nearly 500 people were imprisoned for breaking the terms of their bail. This caused an overflow of prisons in the region. British botanist David Bellamy was jailed, which gave the dispute international attention. The author John Marsden, after being arrested at the blockade, was placed in the maximum security division of Risdon Prison for a week as there was nowhere else to hold him.

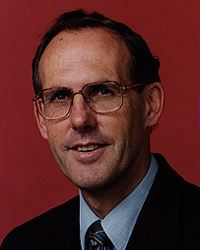
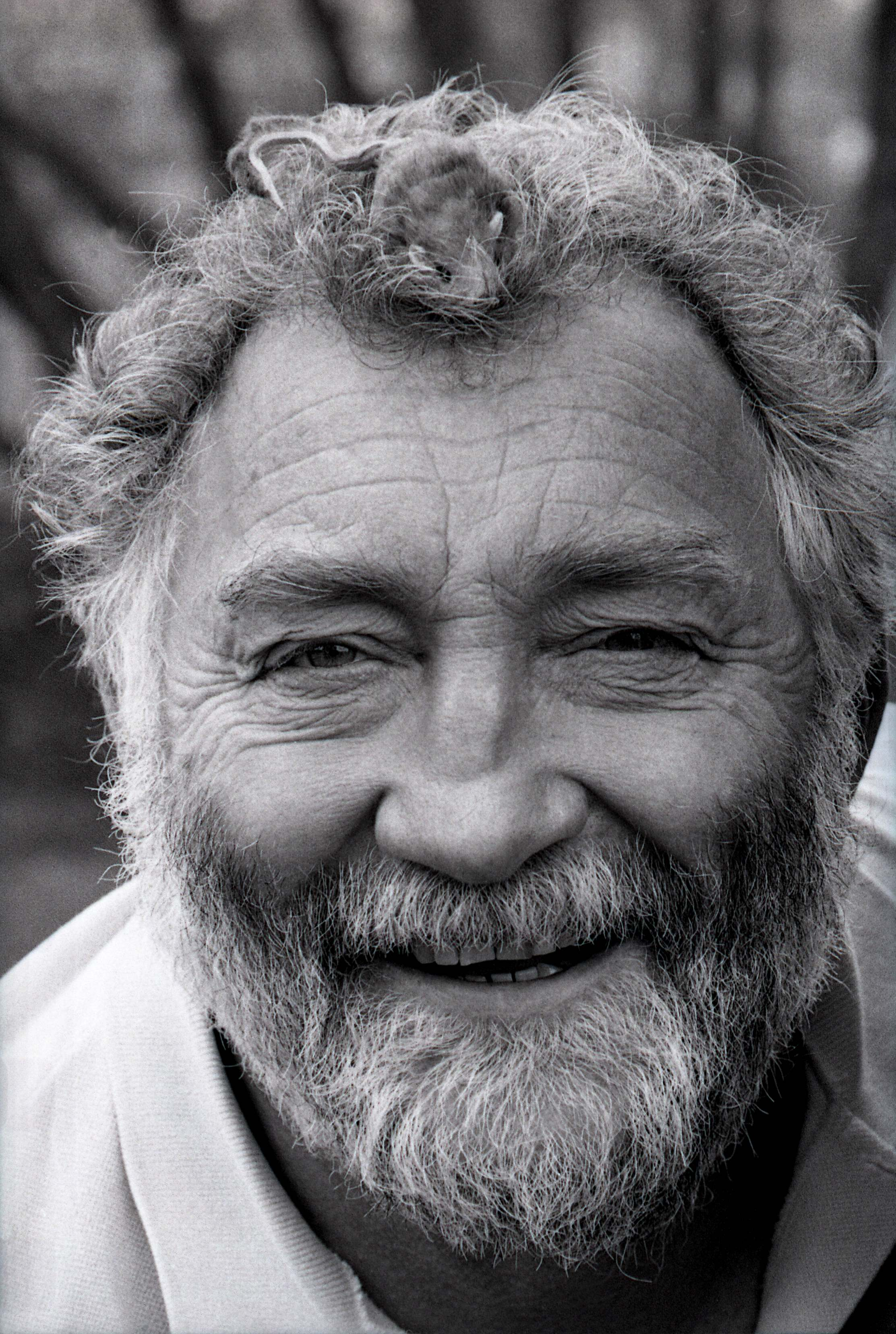
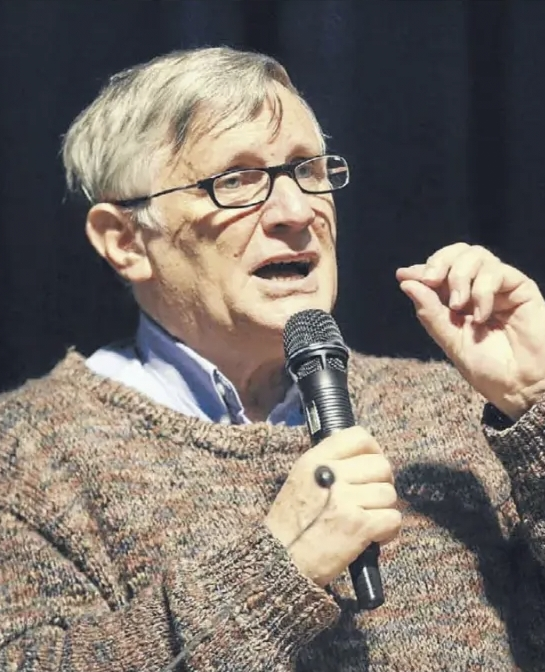
Bob Brown, David Bellamy and John Marsden were jailed for participating in the blockade.

In February, a Hobart rally against the dam drew approximately 20,000 people. On 1 March, the movement launched a day of action, which they labelled 'G-Day'. 231 people were arrested as a flotilla of boats took to the Gordon River. In Hobart, the Wilderness Society flag was flown above the HEC building.

On 2 March the Wilderness Society backed the publication of what were then rare full-page colour advertisements in The Sydney Morning Herald and Melbourne's The Age newspapers of what would soon become an iconic photograph: Morning Mist, Rock Island Bend, Franklin River by Peter Dombrovskis. It was accompanied by the caption "Could you vote for a party that will destroy this?".

Folk rock singer Shane Howard from the band Goanna wrote "Let the Franklin Flow", and released it in April 1983. It was performed by members of his band and members of folk band Redgum under the pseudonym, Gordon Franklin & the Wilderness Ensemble. It was released as a single with a B-side, "Franklin River – World Heritage", written and recorded by Bob Brown.

== Resolution ==
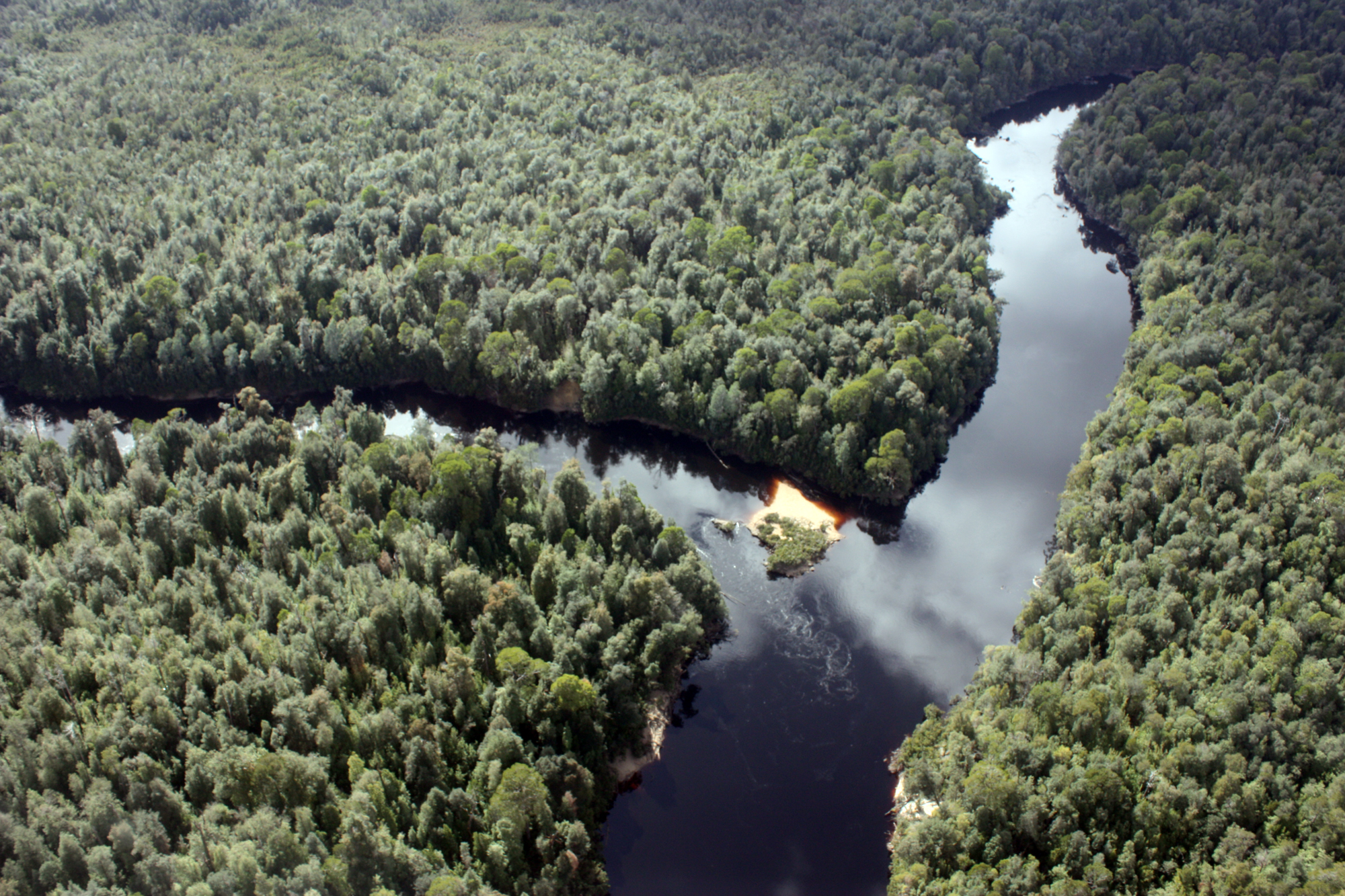
Confluence of the Franklin and Gordon River in 2009.

On 5 March 1983, the Australian Labor Party won the federal election with a large swing. The new prime minister, Bob Hawke, had vowed to stop the dam from being built, and the anti-dam vote increased Hawke's majority — some federal Victorian seats were notable for having a strong interest in the issue. However, in Tasmania, the vote went against the national trend and the Liberals held all five seats. Hawke's government first passed regulations under the existing National Parks and Wildlife Conservation Act 1975, and then passed the World Heritage Properties Conservation Act 1983, which prohibited Franklin River dam-related clearing, excavation and building activities that had been authorised by Tasmanian state legislation.

However, the Tasmanian government ignored both the federal regulations and legislation and continued to order work on the dam. In April 1983 the Australian government sent a Mirage jet and later an RF-111, from the Royal Australian Air Force, to undertake a reconnaissance mission over the dam to gather evidence that the Tasmanian Government was not complying with Federal legislation to stop work.

The issue was brought before the High Court with the first day of hearings on 31 May 1983. The government of Tasmania claimed that the federal government had no powers under the Constitution to pass either the regulations or the legislation. They claimed that as the right to legislate for the environment was not named in the Constitution, and was thus a residual power held by the states, that the World Heritage Properties Conservation Act 1983 was unconstitutional. The federal government, however, successfully argued that they had the right to do so, under the 'external affairs' provision of the Constitution as, by passing legislation blocking the dam's construction, they were fulfilling their responsibilities under an international treaty (the UNESCO Convention for the Protection of the World Cultural and Natural Heritage, Australia having signed and ratified that convention and the Franklin River having been listed on it). The Commonwealth government also argued (successfully) that the federal legislation was supported by the constitutional powers of a federal government to pass laws about corporations and about the people of any race (in this case the aboriginal race, whose sacred caves along the Franklin would have been inundated).

The resulting court case became known as Commonwealth v Tasmania. On 1 July 1983, in a landmark decision, the High Court on circuit in Brisbane ruled by a vote of 4 to 3 in the federal government's favour. Judges Mason, Murphy, Brennan and Deane were in the majority and justices Wilson and Dawson with Chief Justice Gibbs were in the minority. This ruling gave the federal government the power to legislate on any issue if necessary to enforce an international treaty and has been the subject of controversy ever since. Justice Lionel Murphy wrote most broadly of the Franklin Dam decision's broader environmental and social implications in terms of the UNESCO Convention's common heritage of humanity principle, stating that "The preservation of the world's heritage must not be looked at in isolation but as part of the co-operation between nations which is calculated to achieve intellectual and moral solidarity of mankind and so reinforce the bonds between people which promote peace and displace those of narrow nationalism and alienation which promote war...[t]he encouragement of people to think internationally, to regard the culture of their own country as part of world culture, to conceive a physical, spiritual and intellectual world heritage, is important in the endeavour to avoid the destruction of humanity." The High Court ruling ended the dam's construction, and the plans have never been revived.

On 5 July 1983, a Huon pine known as the Lea Tree, over 2000 years old and about 9 feet (3 metres) across was chainsawed and set alight. Three people who are thought to be the perpetrators were photographed with the tree in the background. This photograph also shows graffiti containing expletives, which appears to be directed against environmentists on the tree. This was likely done by people who were angry that the project was cancelled.

However, dam-building by the Hydro was not finished. The corporation was still able to construct a 'compromise' power development scheme on the nearby King River and Henty River to compensate for the loss of the potential power generation from the Franklin scheme. Further on in time, the West Coast Wilderness Railway - the reconstruction of the old Mount Lyell Abt Railway between Queenstown and Regatta point, was mainly financed by compensation funds allocated to the Tasmanian Government for the "loss" of the Franklin River or Gordon River dams.

== See also ==
- Anka Makovec – Slovene-Australian painter (1938–2017)
