= The Spires (Tasmania) =

Mountain range in Tasmania, Australia

Coordinates: 42°31′S 146°07′E

The Spires is a mountain range in the South West Wilderness, Tasmania, Australia. It is situated east of the Denison River. It lies to the west of the upper Gordon River, and north of Lake Gordon.

It is difficult to access.

The Tasmap of the area is called the same name.

== See also ==
- List of mountains in Australia § Tasmania
