= Prince of Wales Range (Tasmania) =

Mountain range in Tasmania, Australia

- Location within Tasmania

Geography
- Country: Australia
- State: Tasmania
- Region: South West Wilderness
- Range coordinates: 42°32′S 146°00′E

The Prince of Wales Range is a mountain range in the South West Wilderness, Tasmania, Australia. It is situated north and parallel to the Denison River. It lies to the west of Lake Gordon, and southeast of Frenchmans Cap.

It is considered a difficult range to traverse, and is particularly difficult to access.

The first known traverse of the range was by Reg Williams and Olegas Truchanas in 1963.

Named peaks in the range include:

- Diamond Peak
- Olegas Bluff (Note: Originally named Mt YopYop by Reg Williams, but known as Olegas Bluff.)

== See also ==
- List of mountains in Australia § Tasmania
