= Mount King William =

Mountain in Tasmania, Australia

Coordinates: 42.2244°S 146.1388°E

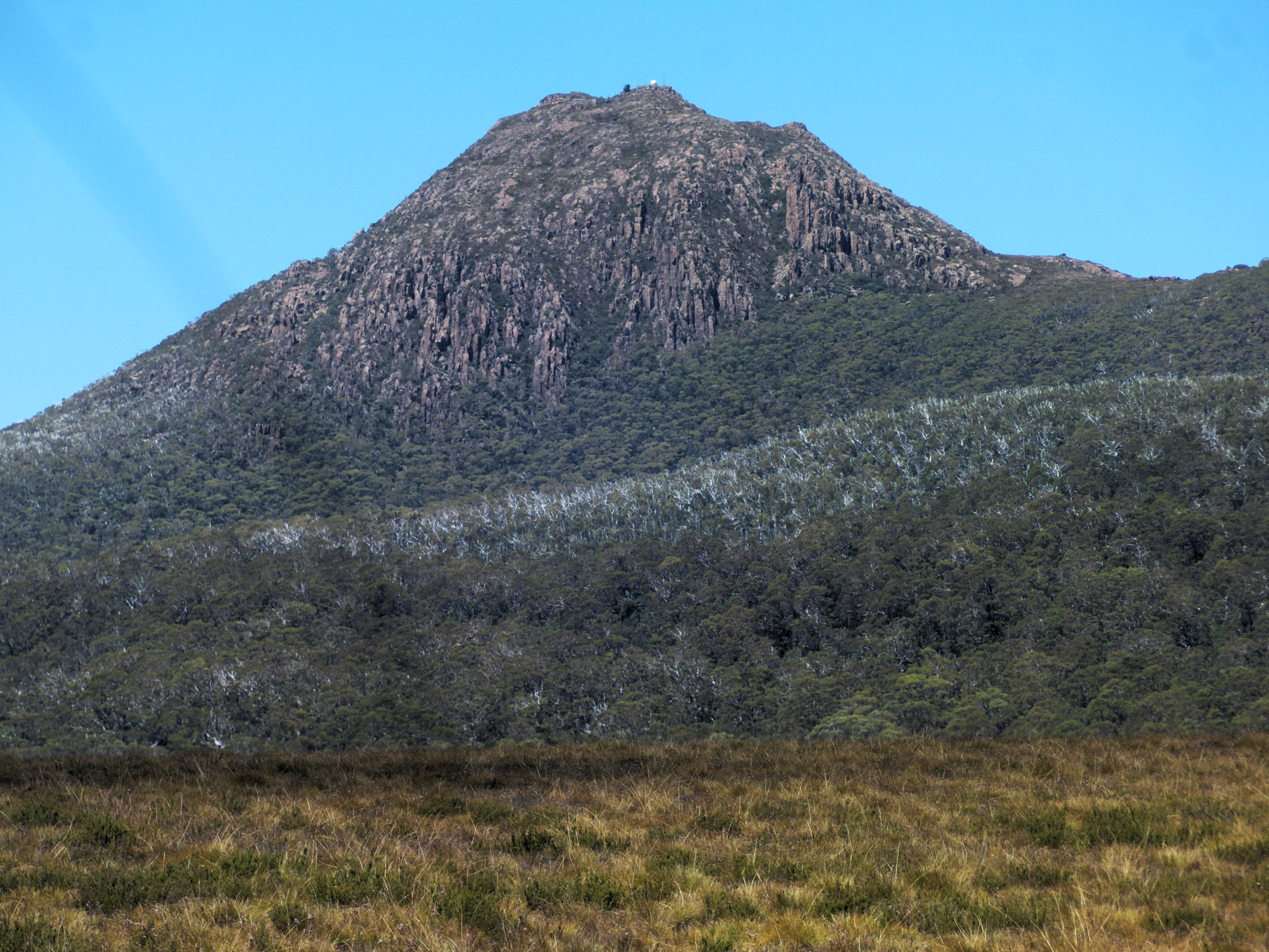
Mount King William I seen from the Lyell Highway

Mount King William I (1,324 m) is a mountain adjacent to the Lyell Highway in Central Highlands, Tasmania. It is located 10 km southwest of Derwent Bridge. It is the northernmost of the King William Range.

It has two namesakes in the King William Range - Mount King William II (1363) and Mount King William III.

It is often a reference point for the 'end' of the inhabited part of the western section of Lyell Highway as there are no permanent structures until Linda; it is inside the eastern boundary of the Franklin-Gordon Wild Rivers National Park.

There is also Lake King William, south of Derwent Bridge. It is dammed at Butlers Gorge, its south end.

Mount King William was named during John Franklin's journey to the west in 1842, although the reigning monarch was in fact Queen Victoria.

William Piguenit painted it while on his journey through the area in the 1880s.

== Historical photograph ==
- http://nla.gov.au/nla.pic-an23768341
