= Lea Tree =

Tree that was the subject of vandalism in 1983

The Lea Tree is a 2,500 year old Huon pine growing on the Lower Gordon River in Tasmania. It was vandalised in 1983. However, it is still alive and growing.

== Vandalism ==
On 5 July 1983, the tree, 9 feet (3 metres) in diameter, was chainsawed, then oil was poured into holes made by the perpetrators and set alight. The fire burnt for 24 hours.

=== Motives ===
The tree is thought to have been vandalised by people who supported the Franklin River Dam project, as the tree had become something of a symbol to the conservationist groups who opposed the dam. On 1 July, four days prior to the vandalism, a High Court Ruling ended the project. There is one theory that it was a publicity stunt by conservationists.
