= Wildness (film) =

2003 documentary film

- Directed by: Scott Millwood
- Written by: Scott Millwood
- Produced by: Michael McMahon
- Starring: Alex Menglet; Brett Climo
- Narrated by: Nina Landis
- Cinematography: Wade Fairley; Robert Humphreys
- Edited by: Bill Murphy
- Release date: 2003
- Running time: 55 minutes
- Country: Australia
- Language: English

Wildness is a 2003 Australian documentary film, created by Scott Millwood and Michael McMahon, about wildlife photographers Olegas Truchanas and Peter Dombrovskis.

The film's music was composed by Evelyn Glennie.

== Production ==
The film uses over 300 of the photographers' images. Actors Alex Menglet and Brett Climo read out some of the words the duo wrote.

== Reception ==
Freya Grant of the Daily Telegraph finishes her review, "Wildness has already been recognised around the country with a host of awards, including Best Documentary at the 2003 Sydney Film Festival, as well as being invited to the Melbourne and Brisbane Film Festivals. But its biggest award should be for its ability to touch audiences with its imagary and its story, which deserves to become part of Australian folklore."

== Awards ==
- 1989 Australian Film Institute Awards
  - Best Documentary - Michael McMahon - won
