= Peter Dombrovskis =

Australian photographer

- Dombrovskis' Morning Mist, Rock Island Bend, National Library of Australia, Canberra.
- Born: Peter Herbert Dombrovskis; 2 March 1945; Wiesbaden, Germany
- Died: 28 March 1996 (aged 51); South West Tasmania, Australia
- Occupation: Photographer
- Years active: 1960s–1996
- Known for: Wilderness photography
- Notable work: Morning Mist, Rock Island Bend, Franklin River

Peter Herbert Dombrovskis (Latvian: Pēteris Dombrovskis; 2 March 1945 – 28 March 1996) was an Australian photographer, known for his Tasmanian scenes. In 2003, he was posthumously inducted into the International Photography Hall of Fame, the first Australian photographer to achieve that honour.

== Biography ==
Dombrovskis was born in 1945 in a refugee camp in Wiesbaden, Germany to Latvian parents. Together with his mother, he migrated to Australia in 1950, and they settled in Fern Tree, a suburb of Hobart. The protégé of noted wildlife photographer and activist Olegas Truchanas, his photographs of the Tasmanian Wilderness, particularly his own annual Tasmanian Wilderness Calendar and the Wilderness Calendar produced by the Tasmanian Wilderness Society, brought images of once remote and inaccessible areas of the state into the public realm. Dombrovskis founded West Wind Press in 1977 and later went on to print calendars entirely of his own work, featuring incisive commentary from pre-eminent environmental professionals.

His most famous photograph is Morning Mist, Rock Island Bend, Franklin River, which some commentators believe played a part in the victory of Bob Hawke in the 1983 Australian federal election. The photograph portrayed a section of the Franklin River which was to be submerged by the proposed Franklin Dam, and it highlighted the visual appeal of the Franklin River during the contentious "No Dams" campaign of 1982. In 1983, Dombrovskis published a book, Wild Rivers, co-authored with Bob Brown, which exemplified his skill in photographing the Gordon and Franklin rivers.

On 28 March 1996, Dombrovskis died of a heart attack while photographing near Mount Hayes, in the Western Arthurs mountain range in South-West Tasmania.

His works are represented in the collections of the National Gallery of Australia in Canberra, the National Gallery of Victoria, the Tasmanian Museum and Art Gallery, the Australian Heritage Commission, and in private hands.

== Exhibitions ==
- 2017 - Dombrovskis: Journeys into the Wild, National Library of Australia - Canberra, Australia
- 2020 - Tasmanian Wilderness, Cradle Mountain Wilderness Gallery - Cradle Mountain, Australia

== See also ==
- Gordon Splits
- Olegas Truchanas
- David Tatnall (photographer)
- Wildness (film)
