= David Tatnall =

Australian nature photographer

- Born: 1955 (age 70–71); Melbourne, Australia
- Occupation: Photographer
- Website: davidtatnall.com

David Tatnall (born 1955) is a Melbourne photographer, known for his representation of the natural landscape. Tatnall began his career as an artistic photographer in 1975. He works with both large format and pinhole camera techniques. His work is in the same tradition as Peter Dombrovskis and Olegas Truchanas – in the past, Tatnall has worked with Dombrovskis.

"I tend to go with no preconceived idea of what I'm going to photograph, other than I'm going to this particular location and I'll see what's there. I go mainly to experience the location, to experience the wilderness area, to go there on a walking trip and I take my camera. If I see things to make photographs, I'll stop and make photographs."

== Selected works ==
His works are held in the collections of the National Gallery of Victoria, State Library of Victoria and the Australian Embassy, Washington USA.

The Monash Gallery of Art holds a famous 1986 work, 'Forest, Crows Foot Track, Rodger River, East Gippsland, Victoria'. In 2014, Tatnall explained how the work was made and its subsequent impact.

"On this ten-day trip I returned with twelve negatives; Forest at Crows Foot Track was the finest."

== Awards ==
Tatnall has been awarded a Life Time Contribution Award by Parks Victoria, and an Honorary Life Membership of the Victorian National Parks Association for his lasting influence on nature conservation in Victoria through photography.

His photographs have become emblems of successful Australian nature conservation battles.

== Projects and activities ==
- ‘Land Bridge’: a series of photographs of the Victoria coast, Bass Strait Islands and Tasmania.
- ‘Woodlands’: a series of photographs of ‘ordinary’ bush (hard to photograph non-iconic or monotonous landscape).
- A close association with the Merri Creek. Tatnall has had three solo exhibitions based on Merri Creek photographs over the past 30 years.
- Artist in Residence at the Alpine School Campus and the Snowy River Campus, School for Student Leadership. The School for Student Leadership is a Victorian government Department of Education and Training (DET) initiative. Over a twenty-year period, Tatnall estimates that he taught around 6000 students film photography.
- Workshops in large format photography, pinhole photography and landscape photography at the Gold Street Studios.
- The Last Summer: A series of large format photographs made of Royal Park, Melbourne in the summer of 2013 – 2014. At that time the park was threatened by the planned construction of a major new freeway, the East West Link.
- Melbourne: Pinhole: A series of photographs of Melbourne made on an 8 x 10 pinhole camera. Funded by the Melbourne City Council.

== Selected exhibitions ==
- 2017 Time and Tide, Colour Factory Gallery, Melbourne, Australia.
- 2015 Earth matters: contemporary photographers in the landscape, Monash Gallery of Art, Melbourne, Australia. Part of ART+CLIMATE=CHANGE 2015.
  - Review: Monash Gallery of Art photography exhibition explores the landscape of climate change, Dylan Rainforth, Sydney Morning Herald, 17 March 2015.
  - Catalogue essay and list of works, Monash Gallery of Art, 2015.
- 2014 Royal Park – The Last Summer, FortyFive Downstairs, Melbourne, Australia.
  - Review: Exhibition review by Christopher Deere: Royal Park – The Last Summer , Christopher Deere, Large Format Photography Australia, 19 March 2014.
- 2014 Khem (group show), Strange Neighbour, Melbourne, Australia.
  - Catalogue essay, Linsey Gosper, curator.
- 2014 Wildcards: Bill Henson shuffles the deck (group show), Monash Gallery of Art, Melbourne, Australia. Curated by Bill Henson.
  - List of works, Monash Gallery of Art, 2014.
  - Review: Wildcards, Bill Henson Shuffles the Deck – review, Fiona Gruber, 12 February 2014, The Guardian Australia.
- 2013 Coastal Pinholes, Gold Street Studios, Melbourne, Australia.
- 2011 The Quiet Landscape, Gold Street Studios, Melbourne, Australia.
- 2010 Field of View, Point Light Gallery, Surry Hills, Australia.
  - Review: 'Visions of Steel, Flesh, Fire and Ice', Robert McFarlane, Ozphotoreview, 7 October 2010.
- 2007 Melbourne: Pinhole, City Library gallery, Melbourne, Australia.
  - Review: 'Back to basics', Terry Lane, The Age, 16 August 2017.
- 2003 Seeing the Forest and the Trees, Castlemaine Art Museum, Castlemaine, Australia.
- 2002 Himalaya, The Photographers' Gallery and Workshop, Melbourne, Australia.
- 1988 The Thousand Mile Stare (group show), Australian Centre for Contemporary Art, Melbourne, Australia.
  - Review: 'On an escalator from the Inferno to James Bond', Beatrice Faust, The Age, 30 March 1988.

== Publications ==
- Wild places of greater Melbourne , Robin Taylor (text); Richard Weatherly (illustrations); David Tatnall (photographs) and others, 1999, CSIRO Publishing, ISBN 9780957747104.
- Tracks through time: the Narracan walks book, John Wells (text); David Tatnall (photographs), 1988, Narracan Bicentennial Walks Book Committee.

== Interviews ==
- Interview with Amanda Smith, 'Artworks', ABC Radio National, 16 September 2007.
- Interview with editor, 'Interview with David Tatnall', Large Format Photography Australia, 21 May 2013.
- Interview with Michéla Griffith, 'David Tatnall, Featured Photographer', On Landscape, 8 December 2021.
