= William Piguenit =

Australian painter

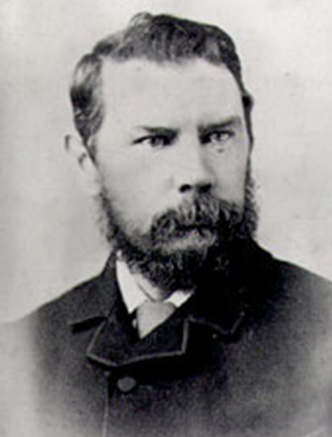
- Born: 27 August 1836; Hobart, Van Diemen's Land
- Died: 17 July 1914 (aged 77); Hunters Hill, Sydney, New South Wales, Australia
- Other name: WC Piguenit
- Known for: Painting

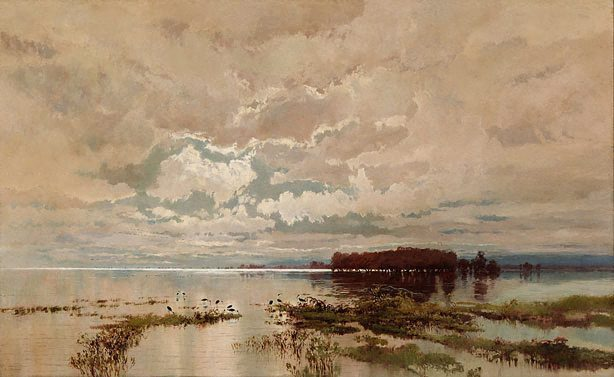
The Flood in the Darling, 1890

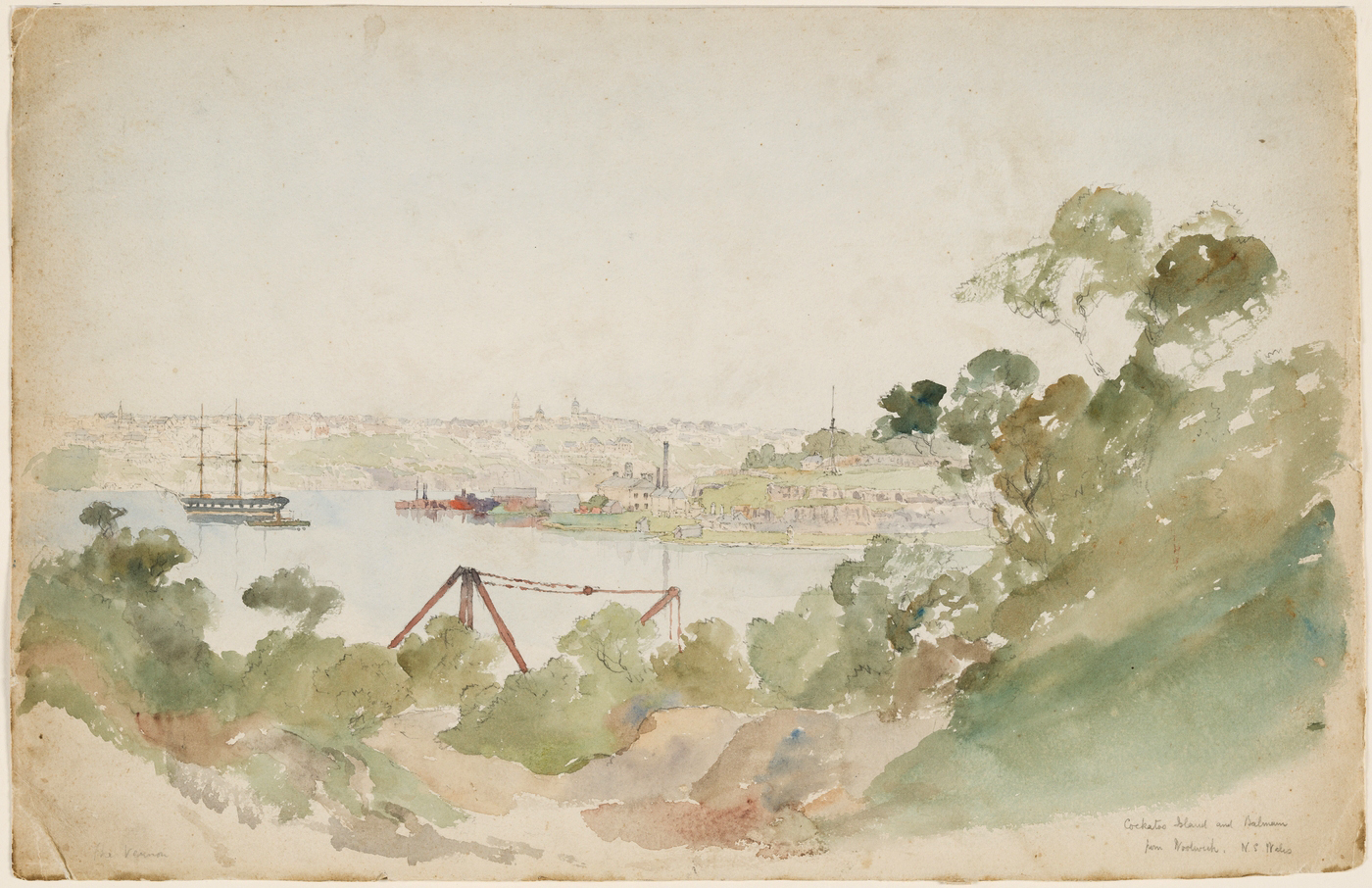
Cockatoo Island and Balmain from Woolwich, 1882-1895

William Charles Piguenit (27 August 1836 – 17 July 1914) was an Australian landscape painter.

== Early life ==
Piguenit was born in Hobart, Tasmania, to Frederick Le Geyt Piguenit and Mary Ann née Igglesden. Frederick had been transported to Van Diemen's Land in 1830, with Mary Ann following him. They married in Hobart in 1833. His first artistic influences came from his mother, who set up a school for young ladies where she taught "French, music and drawing".

== Career ==
In 1850 he became a draftsman with the Tasmanian Lands & Survey Department, working in particular on the Geological Survey of Tasmania. During this employment Piguenit provided lithographic illustrations for The Salmon Ponds and vicinity, New Norfolk, Tasmania. He took painting lessons from Scottish immigrant artist Frank C. Dunnett (1822–1891). Until he got a good price for a painting from Sir James Agnew, the Premier of Tasmania, he had little success as a painter. Piguenit left public service in 1873 to devote his time to painting. His painting of Tasmanian landscapes soon brought favourable reviews. He was a participant in the exploration, description and surveying of the western part of Tasmania. The paintings he produced of western Tasmania were purchased by the Tasmanian government under a special act of parliament.

=== New South Wales ===
After moving to NSW in 1880 Piguenit's subjects included the Darling, Nepean and Hawkesbury Rivers as well as the Lane Cove River close to his Hunters Hill home. At this time he became one of the founders of the Art Society of New South Wales. Later, during a visit to Tasmania he was noticed by Lady Hamilton, wife of Governor Robert Hamilton and many of his drawings were purchased by the government for the Hobart gallery.

== Death ==
Piguenit died on 17 July 1914 at his home, "Saintonge", in the Sydney suburb of Hunters Hill. He was buried in the Field of Mars cemetery, where his headstone inscription reads: IN LOVING MEMORY OF WILLIAM CHARLES PIGUENIT DIED 17th JULY 1914; AGED 77 YEARS. "UNTO THE UPRIGHT THERE ARISETH LIGHT IN THE DARKNESS" (Field of Mars Cemetery: C of E, Sec. C. Grave 618).

== Gallery ==
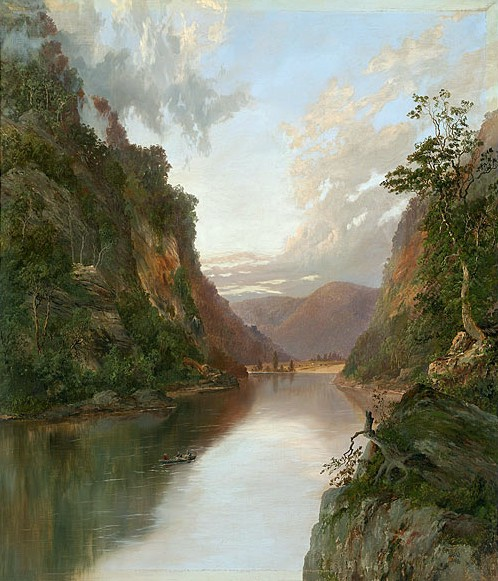
Hawkesbury River with Figures in Boat (1881)

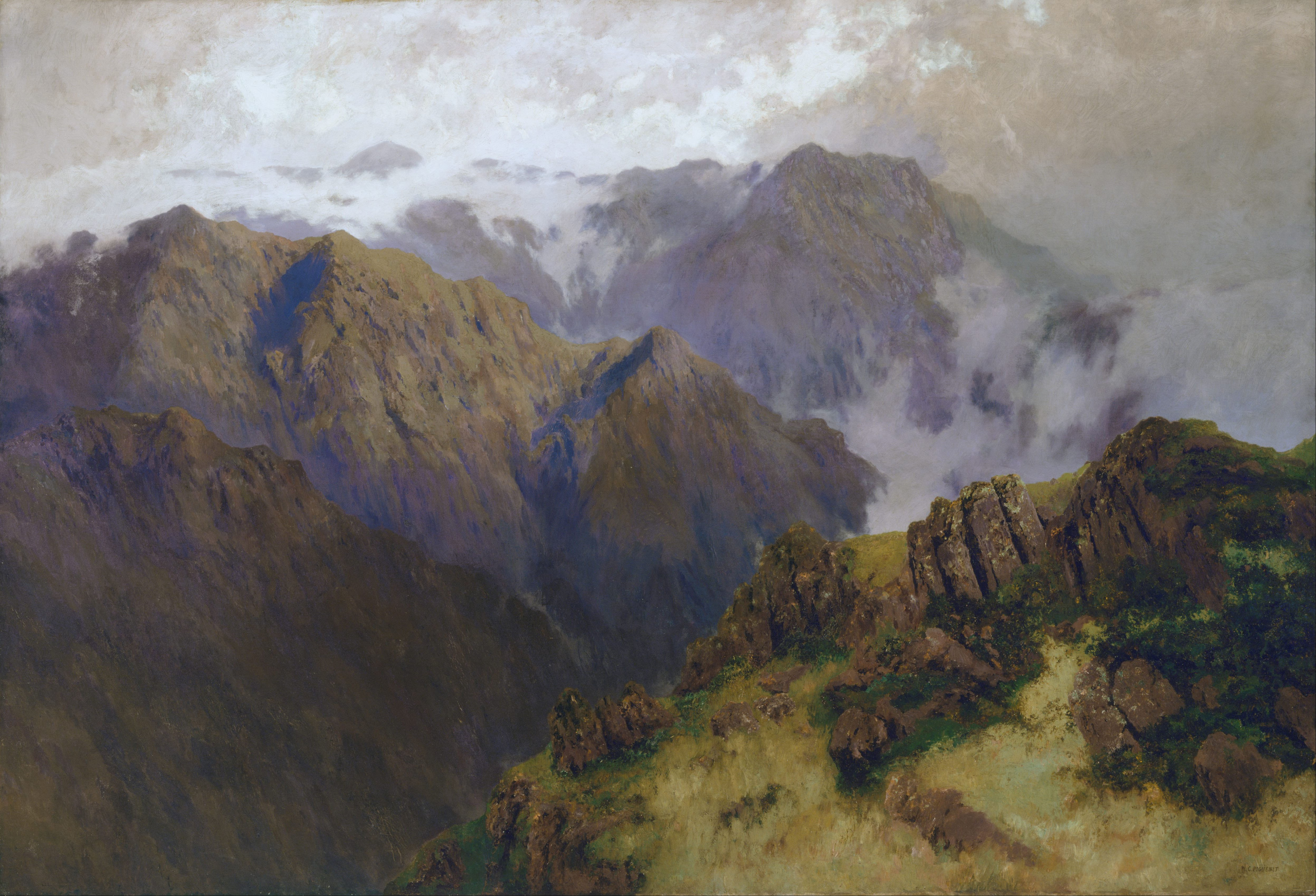
Mount Kosciuszko (1903)

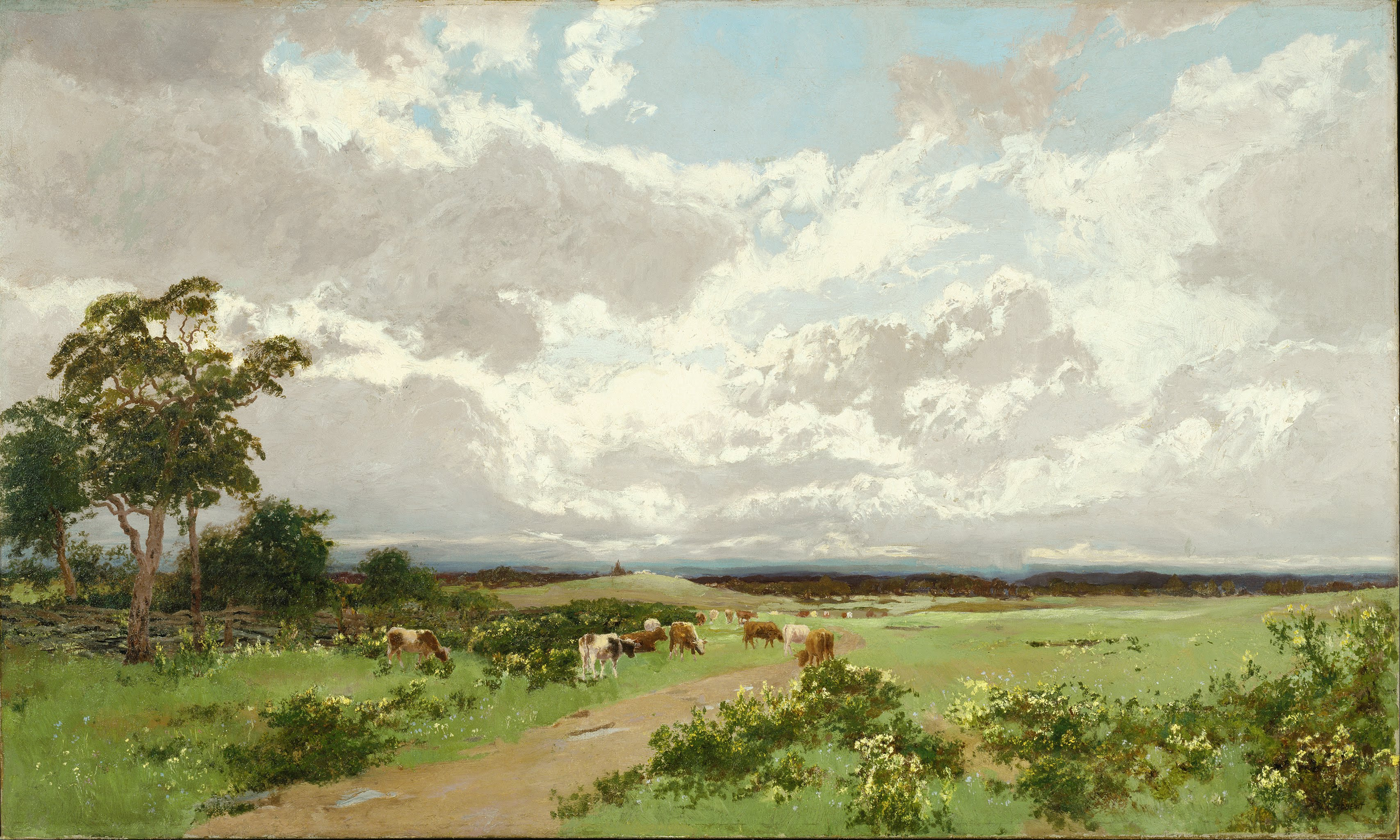
Near Liverpool, New South Wales (1908)

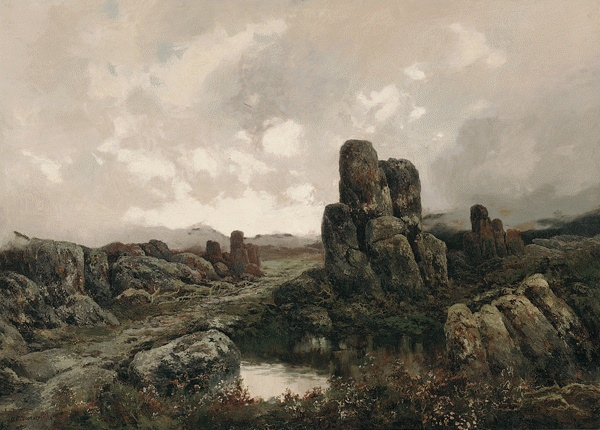
The Summit of the King William Range (1902)

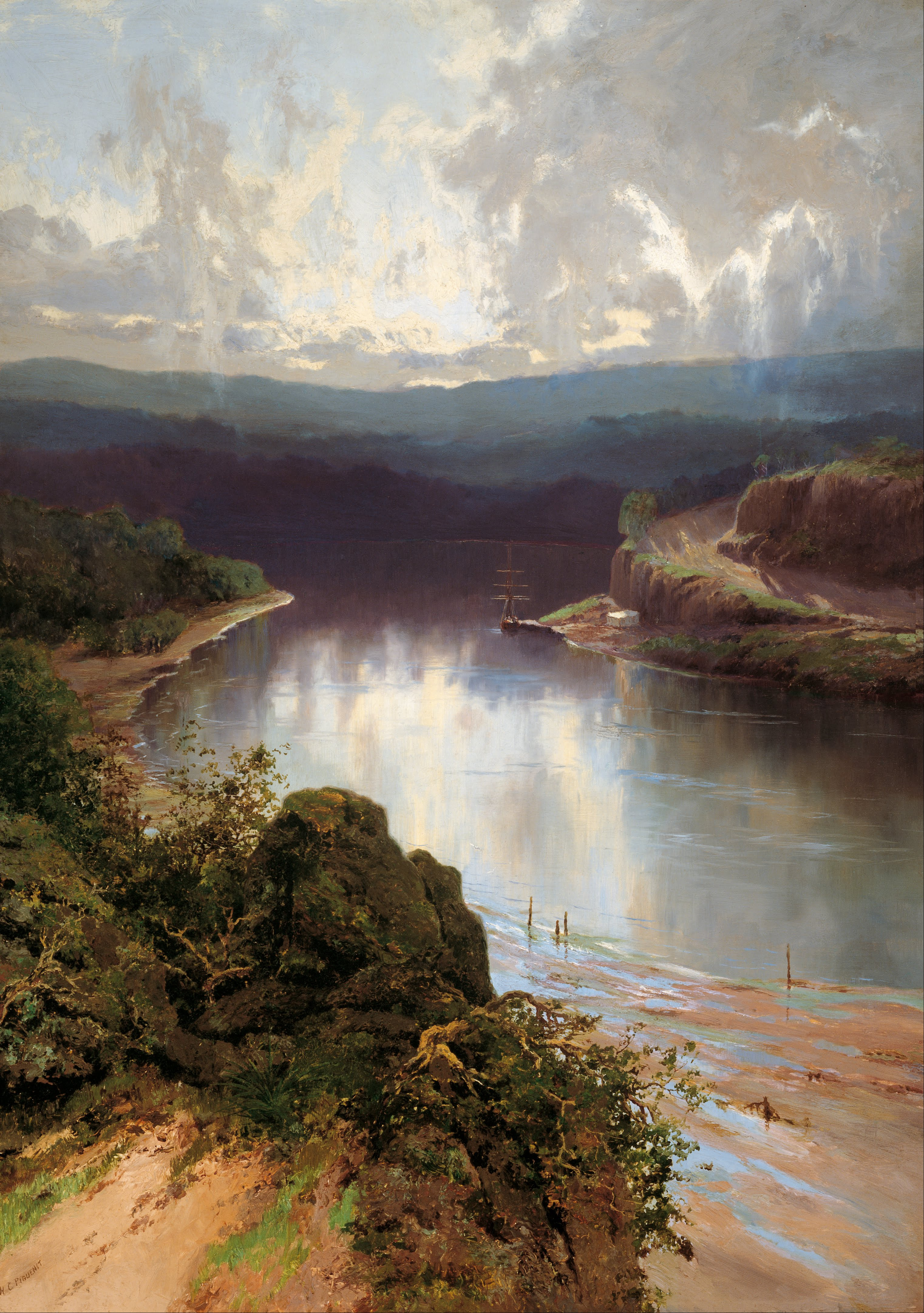
An Australian Fjord (c. 1900)

== Collections ==
- Art Gallery of New South Wales
- Art Gallery of South Australia
- Art Gallery of Western Australia
- Geelong Art Gallery
- National Gallery of Australia
- National Gallery of Victoria
- National Library of Australia
- State Library of Tasmania
- Tasmanian Museum and Art Gallery
- State Library of New South Wales

== See also ==
- Visual arts of Australia
- French Australian

== Resources ==
- Diary, 1871, 1873, 1875, State Library of Queensland
- Account of trips from Hobart Town to Port Davey 14 February 1871 – 9 March 1871, from Hobart Town to Lake St. Clair 8 Feb. 1873-10 Mar. 1873 and from Hobart Town to Queensland 13 September 1875 – 13 October 1875, including i.a. notes concerning sketches, photographs and landscape scenery.
- William Charles Piguenit's scrapbook, ca. 1803-1912, compiled by W.C. Piguenit, digitised, State Library of New South Wales, PX*D 234
