= Commonwealth v Tasmania =

1983 Australian constitutional law case

Commonwealth v The State of Tasmania
- Court: High Court of Australia Canberra
- Full case name: The Commonwealth of Australia v State of Tasmania
- Decided: 1 July 1983
- Citations: [1983] HCA 21, (1983) 158 CLR 1

Case history
- Prior action: none
- Subsequent action: none

Court membership
- Judges sitting: Gibbs CJ, Mason, Murphy, Wilson, Brennan, Deane & Dawson JJ

Case opinions
- (4:3) the Commonwealth validly prohibited construction of the dam, by virtue of the World Heritage Act (per Mason, Murphy, Brennan & Deane JJ) (4:0) any Constitutional restriction preventing the Commonwealth from inhibiting the functions of the States did not apply (per Mason, Murphy, Brennan & Deane JJ)

Commonwealth v Tasmania (popularly known as the Tasmanian Dam Case) was a significant Australian court case, decided in the High Court of Australia on 1 July 1983. The case was a landmark decision in Australian constitutional law, and was a significant moment in the history of conservation in Australia. The case centred on the proposed construction of a hydro-electric dam on the Gordon River in Tasmania, which was supported by the Tasmanian government, but opposed by the Australian federal government and environmental groups.

== Background to the case ==
In 1978, the Hydro-Electric Commission, then a body owned by the Tasmanian government, proposed the construction of a hydro-electric dam on the Gordon River, below its confluence with the Franklin River, in Tasmania's rugged south-west region. The dam would have flooded the Franklin River. In June 1981 the Labor state government created the Wild Rivers National Park in an attempt to protect the river. The boundaries would have allowed the construction of another dam lower on the Gordon River, below its confluence with the Olga River.

In May 1982, a Liberal state government was elected which supported the dam. The federal Liberal government at the time, led by Malcolm Fraser, made offers of compensation to Tasmania, however, they were not successful in stopping the dam's construction.

In November 1982, UNESCO declared the Franklin area a World Heritage Site after a nomination by the Labor government, forwarded by the Commonwealth, was accepted by the World Heritage Committee. During the 1983 federal election, the Labor party under Bob Hawke had promised to intervene and prevent the construction of the dam. After winning the election, the Labor government passed the World Heritage Properties Conservation Act 1983 (Cth), which, in conjunction with the National Parks and Wildlife Conservation Act 1975 enabled them to prohibit clearing, excavation and other activities within the Tasmanian Wilderness World Heritage area.

The Tasmanian government challenged these actions, arguing that the Australian Constitution gave no authority to the federal government to make such regulations. In May and June 1983, both governments put their case to the High Court of Australia.

== Case ==
The case revolved around several major constitutional issues, the most important being the constitutional validity of the World Heritage Properties Conservation Act 1983 (or World Heritage Act). The division of powers between the Australian federal government and the individual state governments are defined mainly by section 51 of the Australian constitution. The federal government had taken a range of actions, which they claimed were authorised under specific subsections of section 51. The Tasmanian government disputed these claims.

=== External affairs power ===
Section 51(xxix) of the Australian Constitution gives the federal parliament the power to make laws with respect to external affairs, a nebulously defined provision. The Hawke government passed the World Heritage Act under this provision, claiming that the Act was giving effect to an international treaty to which Australia was a party, in this case, the Convention Concerning the Protection of the World Cultural and Natural Heritage, which governs UNESCO's World Heritage Site program.

The Tasmanian government (as well as the governments of Victoria, New South Wales and Queensland) opposed this action. Allowing the federal government such broad new powers would infringe on the States' power to legislate in many areas, and would upset the "federal balance". Chief Justice Gibbs said that although all of the Constitution is open to interpretation, "the external affairs power differs from the other powers conferred by s 51 in its capacity for almost unlimited expansion." Defining which affairs were of "international character" was a difficult task for the court.

However, Justice Mason recognised that the external affairs power was specifically intended to be ambiguous, and capable of expansion. When the Constitution came into effect in 1901, there were few (if any) international organizations such as the United Nations in existence (not to mention multinational corporations). However, in modern times, there are many more areas in which nations cooperate.

In his judgement, Justice Murphy said that in order for a law to have an international character, it is sufficient that it:

- implements an international law or treaty;
- implements a recommendation from the United Nations or a related body, such as the WHO or ILO;
- deals with relationships between bodies (public or private) within Australian and bodies outside; or
- deals with things inside Australia of international concern.

The decisions of UNESCO in designating World Heritage Sites have no binding force upon any government. However, the ratification of the convention could be seen as a commitment to upholding its aims, and an acceptance of obligations under it.

=== Corporations power ===
Section 51(xx) provides that the federal government has powers to make laws regarding foreign, trading and financial corporations. Tasmania argued that this head of power could not apply to its Hydro-Electric Commission since it was in effect a department of the Tasmanian government, and not a trading corporation. However, as the HEC was engaged in the widespread production and sale of electricity, and had a degree of independence from the government, it was held to be a trading corporation.

=== Acquisition of property on just terms ===
Section 51(xxxi) of the Australian Constitution provides that the federal government has the power to appropriate property "on just terms" for any other purpose it has powers to make laws about (see Section 51 of the Constitution of Australia: for example, acquiring land to build a military base). The crucial phrase in this section is "on just terms". Tasmania argued that the federal government has deprived it of property unjustly by passing the World Heritage Act. Justice Brennan said however that Tasmania had no proprietary rights over the site for the proposed dam (that is, it was not private land), and therefore it had not been deprived of any property.

== Decision ==
A four to three majority of the seven members of the High Court held that the federal government had legitimately prevented construction of the dam, and that the World Heritage Act was authorised under the "external affairs" power. Although other parts of the Act were invalid, the provision banning the construction of dams was valid.

== Consequences ==
The case ended the HEC's plans to construct more hydro-electric dams in Tasmania.

The legal debate over the extent of the "external affairs" power continued for a decade in a series of cases in the High Court in which the wide view of the external affairs power prevailed. It is now firmly established that under section 51(xxix) of the Australian Constitution the Australian Government has the power to enact legislation that is reasonably capable of being considered appropriate and adapted to fulfill Australia's international legal obligations.

Due to the large number of international obligations that Australia has accepted under international treaties, the external affairs power in section 51(xxix) gives the Australian Government a very wide constitutional power to make laws on many subjects, including protecting the environment.

Large parts of Australia's main national environmental law, the Environment Protection and Biodiversity Conservation Act 1999 (Cth), depend for their constitutional validity on the decision in the Tasmanian Dam Case regarding the external affairs power.

These include the protection of World Heritage properties, Ramsar wetlands, threatened species and threatened ecological communities, and migratory species.

== Definition of Aboriginality ==
The case was later referred to in other cases regarding the definition of Aboriginality (Aboriginal Australian identity). Commonwealth v Tasmania had defined an Aboriginal or Torres Strait Islander as "a person of Aboriginal or Torres Strait Islander descent who identifies as an Aboriginal or Torres Strait Islander and is accepted as such by the community in which he or she lives". The ruling was a three-part definition comprising descent, self-identification and community identification. The first part – descent – was genetic descent and unambiguous, but led to cases where a lack of records to prove ancestry excluded some. Self- and community identification were more problematic as they meant that an Indigenous Australian person separated from their community due to a family dispute could no longer identify as Aboriginal or Torres Strait Islander. As a result, there arose court cases throughout the 1990s where excluded people demanded that their Aboriginality be recognised.

In 1998 Justice Merkel held in Shaw v Wolf that Aboriginal descent is "technical" rather than "real" – thereby eliminating a genetic requirement. This decision established that anyone can classify themself legally as an Aboriginal, provided they are accepted as such by their community.

== See also ==
- Australian constitutional law
- Franklin Dam controversy
- 1981 Tasmanian power referendum

== Bibliography ==
- Commonwealth v Tasmania – Full text of the decision in the High Court of Australia.
- Australian Constitution – Full text.
- World Heritage Properties Conservation Act, 1983 (Cth) – Full text.
- UNESCO – the World Heritage Centre
