= 1981 Tasmanian power referendum =

Plebiscite in Tasmania

Tasmanian power referendum, 1981
- 12 December 1981
- Location of proposed dam to be built on Gordon River.

Results
Choice	Votes	%
Gordon River above its junction with Olga River	24,844	15.16%
Gordon River below its junction with Franklin River	139,054	84.84%
Valid votes	163,898	64.50%
Invalid or blank votes	90,221	35.50%
Total votes	254,119	100.00%
Registered voters/turnout	276,166	92.02%

The Tasmanian power referendum was a one-question referendum held on 12 December 1981, and intended to determine the location of a proposed hydroelectricity dam to be built on the Gordon River in Tasmania, Australia.

As of 2024, this is the most recent Tasmanian state referendum.

== Background ==
In 1978, the Hydro-Electric Commission (HEC) proposed the construction of a hydroelectricity dam on the Gordon River. The location of the proposed dam was below the Gordon's junction with the Franklin River, and the flooding caused by damming the river would have destroyed the environmentally sensitive Franklin River valley area. Responding to community concern over the proposal, Premier Doug Lowe ordered a moratorium on dam construction and an environmental impact study.

With the community polarised over the proposed dam's environmental impact and Tasmania's economic and employment needs, Lowe proposed a compromise: to construct the dam at a different point on the Gordon, above the junction with the Olga River (Gordon-above-Olga). Lowe was successful in getting the Gordon-above-Olga plan through the Tasmanian House of Assembly, however the more conservative upper house, the Tasmanian Legislative Council, voted to block the legislation and insisted on the HEC's original Gordon-below-Franklin plan.

With a parliamentary deadlock over the issue, Lowe was left with no option but to call for a referendum. When announcing the referendum to the media, he was questioned as to whether it would include a 'No Dams' option and he indicated it would. The President of the Labor Party in Tasmania wrote to all Labor MHAs instructing them to withdraw that option, and Lowe was forced into an embarrassing backdown.

About a month before the referendum was held, Doug Lowe lost a no-confidence motion, and stood down as Premier. He was replaced by Harry Holgate.

== The 'No Dams' campaign ==
A determined campaign against a Franklin Dam by the Tasmanian Wilderness Society was underway, and Lowe hoped to get the support of the society's director, Bob Brown, for the Gordon-above-Olga proposal, also offering to set up a Wild Rivers National Park. Brown refused to support Lowe's alternative unless the "No Dams" option was reinstated on the ballot paper, and when Lowe was unable to comply with this request, the Wilderness Society encouraged its supporters to make their own option by writing "No Dams" on the ballot paper themselves.

== Results ==
=== Initial count ===
Location	Votes	Percentage
Gordon River above its junction with Olga River	20,184	7.94%
Gordon River below its junction with Franklin River	119,875	47.17%
Informal (including ballot papers containing "No Dams")	114,060	44.89%
Total	254,119	100.00%

==== Seat breakdown ====
Seat	Enrolled	Gordon above Olga	Gordon below Franklin
Bass	55,584	4,392 (16.58%)	22,095 (83.42%)
Braddon	53,938	4,175 (13.73%)	26,241 (86.27%)
Denison	54,887	3,515 (14.14%)	21,335 (85.86%)
Franklin	56,568	3,820 (13.76%)	23,934 (86.24%)
Wilmot	55,189	4,282 (14.02%)	26,270 (85.98%)
Total	276,166	20,184	119,875

In the initial count of the ballot papers, a significant protest vote was evident, with tens of thousands of electors writing "No Dams" on their ballot papers. The Tasmanian Electoral Office initially disregarded all these votes as informal, even if the voter had indicated one of the legitimate options. Subsequent legal advice indicated that these votes should be counted, and 23,839 votes were reclassified as formal votes.

=== Recount ===
Location	Votes	Percentage
Gordon River above its junction with Olga River	24,844	9.78%
Gordon River below its junction with Franklin River	139,054	54.72%
Informal	90,221	35.50%
Total	254,119	100.00%
N.B.: Total ballot papers endorsed "No Dams" from all sources	84,514	33.25%

==== Seat breakdown after recount ====
Seat	Enrolled	Gordon above Olga	Gordon below Franklin
Bass	55,584	5,261 (17.17%)	25,379 (82.83%)
Braddon	53,938	5,057 (14.37%)	30,131 (85.63%)
Denison	54,887	4,364 (14.96%)	24,800 (85.04%)
Franklin	56,568	4,952 (14.91%)	28,271 (85.09%)
Wilmot	55,189	5,210 (14.60%)	30,473 (85.40%)
Total	276,166	24,844	139,054

Turnout: 92.01%

== Aftermath ==
Despite the success of the 'No Dams' campaign demonstrated by the significant protest vote, the original Gordon-below-Franklin proposal was carried with a plurality in the referendum. Holgate, who had prorogued the House while the referendum was conducted, pledged the government would proceed with the dam construction. Almost as soon as the House reconvened, Labor lost a no-confidence motion, forcing an election for May 1982. At that election, Tasmanian Labor was roundly defeated by Robin Gray and the Liberal Party. Gray also pledged to build the dam.

On 5 March 1983, federal Labor won power, with new Prime Minister Bob Hawke promising to halt the dam project. The Commonwealth Government legislated to prohibit construction of the Franklin Dam, and the legislation was reinforced in the Commonwealth v Tasmania case before the High Court of Australia.
