= Bruce Watson (songwriter) =

- Born: Bruce Morrisby Watson; 12 February 1956 (age 70); Terang, Victoria, Australia
- Genres: Folk, children's, country
- Occupations: Musician, satirist, public servant
- Instruments: Vocals, guitar
- Website: Official website

Bruce Morrisby Watson (born February 1956, in Terang) is an Australian singer-songwriter, satirist, and children's entertainer. Watson's satires are often political in nature. His style is generally contemporary folk music, he also writes and performs children's songs, conventional folk–country music and political songs. He has issued eight solo albums Politics, Religion and Sex (1990), Real World: Songs of Life, Love & Laughter (1994), Out My Window (1999), Are We There Yet? (2004), A Moving Feast (2004), Balance (2010), Mosaic (2017) and Year of Wonders (2022).

== Early life and education ==
Bruce Morrisby Watson was born on 12 February 1956 at Terang, a town in rural south-western Victoria.

Bruce Watson was educated at Eltham, Brighton Road St. Kilda and Kew primary schools; for secondary education he went to Kew High and then Wesley College.

The son of a clergyman and a language teacher, Watson developed a social conscience and a love of language that have influenced his songwriting and his professional career, first as an academic (tutoring in Political Science and Linguistics) and later working in various branches of the Victorian Public Service.

== Musical career ==
In 1990 Watson released his debut album, Politics, Religion and Sex. One of the tracks, "Amazon", was later covered by fellow folk artists Blackwood, Eric Bogle, and Zampoñistas, as well as a number of other performers in Europe and the United States. In May that year, he launched his book, Songs of a Satirical Bloke, with the Canberra Times' Mike Jackson, describing him as "an academic with a wicked sense of humour". In April 1994 he performed at the National Folk Festival in Canberra, with the Canberra Times' reporter, Graham McDonald, describing his work as "dreadfully funny parodies". Also that year he issued his second album, Real World: Songs of Life, Love & Laughter.

Watson has been called a "major Australian songwriter and performer in the folk tradition", and "an icon of the Australian folk scene." He has performed at over 200 folk music festivals, as well as folk clubs, coffee houses, and house concerts throughout Australia, New Zealand and the United Kingdom. Watson has won several "songwriting awards", such as the Declan Affley Memorial Songwriting Award at the Australia National Folk Festival, the Lawson Paterson Songwriting Award at Port Fairy, and the Roddy Read Memorial Songwriting Award at Maldon Folk Festival.

Watson has collaborated with singer-songwriters Wendy Ealey and Moira Tyers in the audio-visual theme concert presentations, Unsung Heroes of Australian History, at various folk festivals and concert venues. He also performs with Zampoñistas, Melbourne’s Bolivian Panpipe marching band, which includes a panpipe-accompanied version of Amazon in its repertoire.

Watson's song Lake Pedder Again from his Balance CD has appeared on The Folk Show on Radio Adelaide, and I'm on the Train has had regular airplay on ABC's Australia All Over radio show [see Australia All Over].

== Songs ==
=== The Man and the Woman and the Edison Phonograph ===
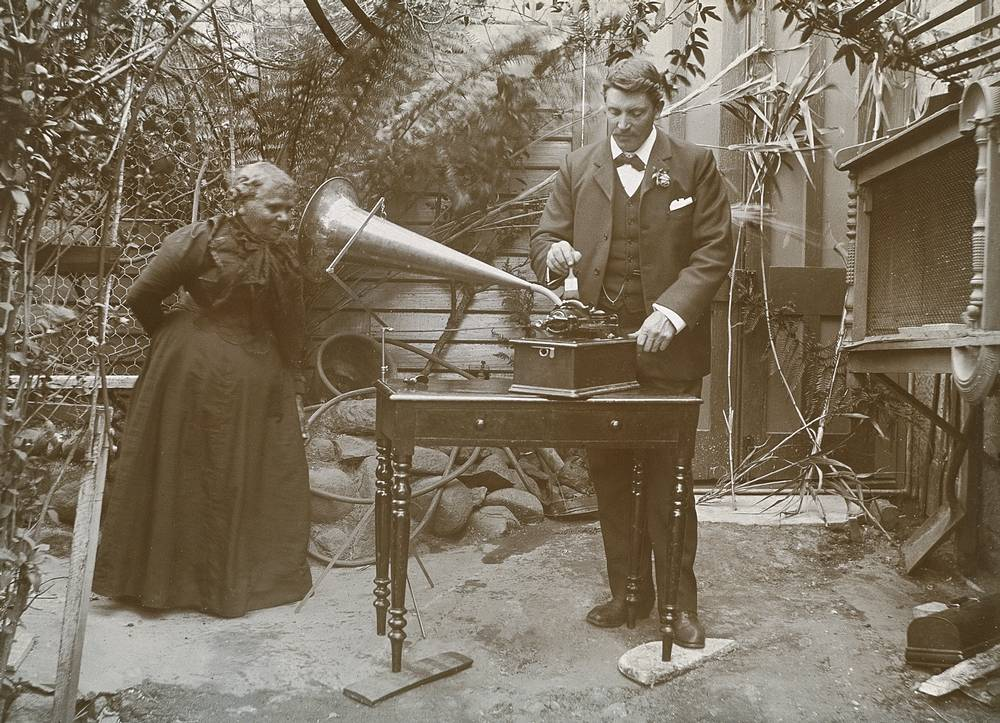
Horace Watson recording the songs of Fanny Cochrane Smith, considered to be the last fluent speaker of a Tasmanian language, 1903.

Watson's great grandfather was Horace Watson (1862–1930), a pharmacist, who, in 1888 in Hobart, had married Louisa née Keen (died 1936) (sixth daughter of Joseph Keen, inventor of Keen's Curry) who was the recent widow of Robert Williamson. In 1899 and in 1903 Horace recorded traditional language songs by indigenous Tasmanian, Fanny Cochrane Smith. Horace and Louisa ran the Keen's Curry company.

The lead track on Watson's third album, Out My Window, "The Man & the Woman & the Edison Phonograph", told the history behind a family photo which depicts Horace Watson recording Tasmanian Aboriginal elder, Fanny Cochrane Smith's vocals in 1903. A similar photo was displayed at the Tasmanian Museum and Art Gallery. Fanny Cochrane Smith (1834–1905) was the last fluent speaker of Tasmanian language.

In the early 2000s Watson was performing at the National Folk Festival when he met the late Ronnie Summers (1944-2020), the great great grandson of Cochrane-Smith. Summers was a Tasmanian Aboriginal Elder and folk singer. He joined with Watson in a rendition of "The Man & the Woman & the Edison Phonograph" in 2005. Watson and Summers recorded the track as a duet for Watson's 2010 album, Balance.

At the National Folk Festival in 2014 Watson the National Film and Sound Archive recorded a short version of the song on a wax cylinder, and this track is included on the 2017 album, Mosaic.

Bruce Watson has created a presentation telling the story of that song and subsequent events that have resulted from its creation, which can be read athttps://www.brucewatsonmusic.com/documents/TMATWATEP_article_2016.pdf. Details of a video presentation can be found on his website: https://www.brucewatsonmusic.com/

=== Olegas ===
The song, Olegas, on the album Out My Window, tells the story of Lithuanian/Tasmanian conservationist and photographer Olegas Truchanas, who led the fight against the flooding of Lake Pedder by the Hydro Electric Commission and was influential in the development of Australia's conservation movement. In 2013 the song was translated into Lithuanian for performance at a celebration of Truchanas’ birth, in his home town of Šiauliai, Lithuania. In June 2018, Bruce Watson visited Šiauliai, and participated in a concert at Truchanas’ former school, the Šiauliai Gymnasium (Lithuanian: Šiaulių Juliaus Janonio gimnazija), where he and the students performed various versions of the song.[CITATION]

== Bibliography ==
- Watson, Bruce (May 1990), Songs of a Satirical Bloke, Foreword by Eric Bogle, Melbourne, Vic: Victorian Folk Music Club Incorporated, ISBN 978-0-9598269-7-5
- Watson, Bruce (2006), 101 Songs, Melbourne, Vic, ISBN 0-646-45960-0

== Discography ==
- Politics, Religion and Sex (1990)
- Real World: Songs of Life, Love & Laughter (1994)
- Out My Window (1999)
- Are We There Yet? (2004)
- A Moving Feast (2004)
- Balance (2010)
- Mosaic (2017)
- Year of Wonders (2022)

=== Compilations and covers ===
- Unsung Heroes of Australian History
