= Tasmanian Conservation Trust =

Tasmanian Conservation Trust is a Tasmania's oldest non-profit conservation organisation; it was formed in 1968. The Trust has a comprehensive and interactive website Tasmanian Conservation Trust and operates a Facebook page.

The Trust is an independent advocate and guardian for conservation and biodiversity in Tasmania.

The Trust publishes a quarterly journal Tasmanian Conservationist on current conservation issues, campaigns and news updates.

== See also ==
- Queensland Conservation Council
