= World Heritage Properties Conservation Act 1983 =

Act of the Parliament of Australia, no longer in force

Parliament of Australia
- Long title: An Act relating to the protection and conservation of certain property, and for related purposes
- Royal assent: 22 May 1983
- Commenced: 22 May 1983
- Introduced by: Barry Cohen
- Status: Repealed

The World Heritage Properties Conservation Act 1983, was an Act of the Parliament of Australia which provided for certain protections for World Heritage listed places.

The validity of the Act was considered by the High Court of Australia in Commonwealth v Tasmania, also known as the Tasmanian Dams case. That case found several provisions of the Act to be invalid, but most of its major provisions were held to be valid.

The Act was repealed in 1999, and replaced by parts of the Environment Protection and Biodiversity Conservation Act 1999.

== History ==
The World Heritage Properties Conservation Bill was introduced on 21 April 1983, by the then Minister for Home Affairs and the Environment, Barry Cohen.

The Tasmanian Dams case (1983) revolved around the validity of the Act. The High Court of Australia was asked separate questions about the validity of:

1. sections 6 and 9,
2. sections 7 and 10,
3. sections 8 and 11, and
4. section 17.

On the first part of question, the court held that s 6(1), (2)(b) and (3) were valid, but that it was not necessary to determine the validity of the other subsections. It held that s 9(1)(h) was valid, but that the remaining subsections of s 9(1) and (2) were invalid. On the second part of the question, the court found that s 7 was valid, and that s 10(1) and (4) were valid (the other parts of s 10 being unnecessary to consider). On the third part of the question, the court held both s 8 and s 11 invalid. It held that it was not necessary to answer the fourth part.

The Act was repealed in 1999 by Schedule 6 of the Environmental Reform (Consequential Provisions) Act 1999, as part of the reforms that saw the introduction of the Environment Protection and Biodiversity Conservation Act 1999, which replaced several prior pieces of environmental legislation. It ceased to have effect on 16 July 2000.

== Provisions ==
The core of the legislation provided for a system of proclamations: sections 9, 10 and 11 set out certain acts which were unlawful if done with respect to properties or sites to which the sections applied, and sections 6, 7 and 8 respectively allowed the Governor-General of Australia to make proclamations declaring that those sections applied to certain eligible properties or sites. The three pairs of sections were set up to make use of three different powers available under the Constitution of Australia: the external affairs power, the corporations power and the race power.

Section 6 concerned sites of natural or cultural heritage value. It allowed proclamations to be made with respect to World Heritage nominated sites, sites which Australia was otherwise obliged to protect under international law, sites that were otherwise a matter of international concern, or sites "part of the heritage distinctive of the Australian nation". These overlapping provisions were designed to touch on different aspects of the external affairs power in the Constitution of Australia, and the last of these was designed to touch on the implied nationhood power.

If the Governor-General were satisfied that a property falling under the above definitions "is being or is likely to be damaged or destroyed" then they could make a proclamation with respect to that property. Once a proclamation was made under section 6, certain acts were prohibited by section 9, including carrying out excavation works, exploratory drilling, constructing "a building or other substantial structure" and felling any trees on the site.

Section 7 was far broader than section 6; it allowed the Governor-General to make proclamations with respect to "any identified property [that] is being or is likely to be damaged or destroyed". However section 10, which set out the consequences of a proclamation under section 7, was narrow in its application; while it covered the same types of acts as section 9, it only made those acts unlawful if performed by certain corporations, namely foreign or trading corporations (that is, those corporations subject to the corporations power in the Constitution). Section 10(4) went further, and specifically made those same acts unlawful if done by such a corporation "for the purposes of its trading activities".

Section 8 allowed proclamations to be made with respect to sites of significance to Indigenous Australians, if either the sites themselves, or any artefacts or relics on them, were or were likely to be damaged or destroyed. Section 11 covered the same acts as described in sections 9 and 10, and rendered them unlawful if done with respect to properties subject to proclamations under section 8.

Once proclamations were made, they had to be tabled before both houses of the Parliament of Australia in accordance with the procedures set out in section 15. Proclamations could be revoked by the Governor-General once the threat of damage or destruction had passed.

=== Exceptions ===
Section 12 provided certain statutory exceptions to the prohibitions in sections 9, 10 and 11, to do with acts permitted under management plans in other federal environment legislation, and acts permitted under state or territory law.

Sections 9, 10 and 11 each provided that acts normally prohibited by those sections would not be unlawful if done with the permission of the relevant Minister (then titled the Minister for Home Affairs and the Environment); section 13 set out the procedures to be followed by the Minister in granting such consent. Section 18 allowed the power to grant consent to be delegated.

=== Enforcement ===
Section 14 granted jurisdiction to both the High Court of Australia and the Federal Court of Australia to grant injunctions restraining acts unlawful under sections 9, 10 or 11; such injunctions could be applied for by the Attorney-General of Australia, or by any "interested person" (which was defined in subsections 3 through to 5 of section 14).

=== Compensation ===
Section 17 provided for a compensation scheme, in the event that any proclamation should amount to an acquisition of property within the meaning of section 51(xxxi) of the Australian Constitution.
