= National Parks and Wildlife Conservation Act 1975 =

Law in Australia

This is a law that was passed by the Australian Labor Party in response to the Franklin Dam controversy. As stated at the top of the bill, it is

"An Act to make provision for and in relation to the Establishment of National Parks and other Parks and Reserves and the Protection and Conservation of Wildlife."

This law is no longer in force.
