= Gordon Splits =

Gorges in Gordon River in Tasmania, Australia

- Gorges
- Location within Tasmania
- Coordinates: 42°44′24″S 145°51′00″E
- Location: South West Tasmania

UNESCO World Heritage Site
- Official name: Tasmanian Wilderness
- Location: Oceania
- Criteria: iii, iv, vi, vii, viii, ix, x
- Reference: 181
- Inscription: 1982 (6th Session)

The Gordon Splits is a notable section of gorges of the Gordon River, located in South West Tasmania, Australia. The once impassable gorges are situated on the lower Gordon River in the Franklin-Gordon Wild Rivers National Park, part of the Tasmanian Wilderness World Heritage Area. The splits has also been an important location of focus within the larger environmental campaign for wilderness preservation in South West Tasmania.

== Location and features ==
The earlier works of Charles Whitham and others suggested that the river went underground at some point. It was not until in 1928 that three piners (J.Hadmar Sticht, G.W. Harrison and Charles Abel) were described as having passed through them in March of that year.

It was reported in the Mercury newspaper of 12 April 1928 under the title The Gordon River - Exploration of the Splits - Showplace of Tasmania - Sprent Falls alone worth the trip.

The section of river is very difficult to access and apart from Olegas Truchanas, Les Southwell and Peter Dombrovskis - few others are known to have successfully traversed the section in the time of European presence in Tasmania. Following the initial journey by Truchanas in 1954 and the complete journey in 1958 through the splits, the photographs taken by Truchanas were destroyed in the 1967 Tasmanian fires. Southwell and others in the 1970s tended to free float on an inflatable water mattress through the splits to alleviate some of the issues arising from using fixed structure boats travelling through.

Photographs by Truchanas, Les Southwell, and Dombrovskis show the steep narrow nature of the splits dramatically in their photographs. More recent aerial photographs can be found like Joe Shemesh's in the Huon Pine book of Kerr and McDermott.

== Later description ==
Geraldine Brooks wrote a piece in the National Times of 24–30 May 1981 which Peter Thompson quoted in his Power in Tasmania as an evocative overview of the splits and their context.

The Splits are a geological phenomenon. Six hundred million years ago, the powerful waters of the Gordon River wore a deep erosion slot through a rugged spine of quartzite. The river runs across the grain of the countryside, instead of following it. The result is rare and spectacular.

From the air, the Splits seem to grasp the Gordon River like giant rocky pincers, squeezing its wide flow into narrow strips of deep water about 100 metres long.

From the river bank below them, they appear like pieces of a giant's unsolved jigsaw, crggy masses and voids of sparkling quartzite, frozen a few metres apart, never quite meshing in the first Split, the rock rises vertically for about 100 metres before it merges with the gentler mountainside.

== Films ==
- (1982) Gordon Splits [videorecording] produced for the Tasmanian Wilderness Society. Melbourne : The Wilderness Society. Director, photographer, editor, Michael Cordell; photographers, Chris Noone, Peter Dombrovskis.
