= Gordon Dam =

Dam in South West Tasmania, Australia

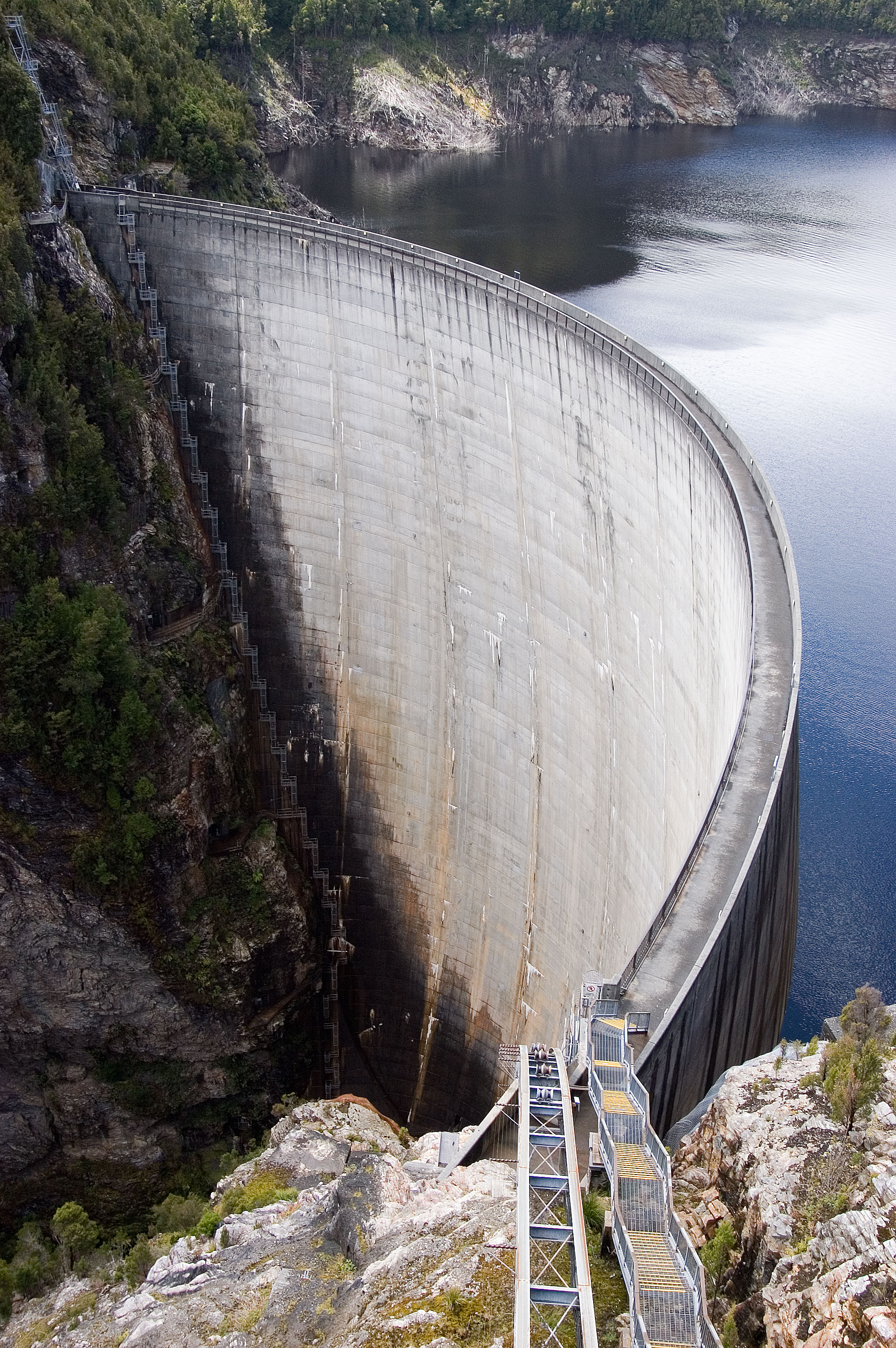
- The double-arch dam wall, holding back Lake Gordon

- Location of the dam in Tasmania
- Interactive map of Gordon Dam
- Country: Australia
- Location: South West Tasmania
- Coordinates: 42°43′50″S 145°58′35″E
- Purpose: Power
- Status: Operational
- Construction began: 1964
- Opening date: 25 November 1974
- Owner: Hydro Tasmania

Dam and spillways
- Type of dam: Arch dam
- Impounds: Gordon River
- Height: 140 m (460 ft)
- Length: 198 m (650 ft)
- Elevation at crest: 310 m (1,020 ft) AHD
- Width (crest): 2.75 m (9 ft 0 in)
- Width (base): 17.7 m (58 ft)
- Dam volume: 154×10^{3} m^{3} (5.4×10^{6} cu ft)
- Spillways: none

Reservoir
- Creates: Lake Gordon
- Total capacity: 12,400 GL (10.1×10^{6} acre⋅ft)
- Catchment area: 1,280 km^{2} (490 sq mi)
- Surface area: 278 km^{2} (69,000 acres)

Gordon Power Station
- Coordinates: 42°43′48″S 145°58′12″E
- Operator: Hydro Tasmania
- Commission date: 1978; 1988
- Type: Conventional
- Turbines: 3 x Fuji 144 MW (193,000 hp)
- Installed capacity: 432 to 450 MW (579,000 to 603,000 hp)
- Capacity factor: 0.9
- Annual generation: 1,388 GWh (5,000 TJ)
- Website hydro.com.au/

The Gordon Dam, also known as the Gordon River Dam, is a major gated double-curvature concrete arch dam across the Gordon River, in the South West region of Tasmania, Australia. Construction of the dam commenced in 1964 and was completed in 1974. The resultant reservoir, Lake Gordon, was established for the purpose of generating hydroelectricity via the Gordon Power Station. The power station also receives inflows from Lake Pedder.

The dam, its reservoir, and the power station are owned and operated by Hydro Tasmania.

The dam and the associated Gordon Power Development Scheme is significant in terms of its size and complexity of the project's construction. At the time of its construction, the dam added substantially to the capacity of Tasmania's electricity generating system by delivering clean, renewable energy, catering for growing demand, and assisting the state to attract new industries. The project was also politically controversial in terms of the environmental impact of both the completed and proposed, subsequently cancelled, works.

== Dam and reservoir overview ==
=== Dam technical details ===
Built by the Hydro Electric Corporation (TAS) between 1964 and 1974, the Gordon Dam wall is 198 metres (650 ft) long and 140 metres (460 ft) high, making it the tallest dam in Tasmania and the fifth-tallest in Australia. (Note: The five tallest dams listed in order of decreasing height are: Dartmouth Dam, 180 metres (590 ft), Victoria; Thomson River Dam, 166 metres (545 ft), Victoria; Talbingo Dam, 162 metres (531 ft), NSW; Warragamba Dam, 142 metres (466 ft), NSW; Gordon Dam, 140 metres (460 ft), Tasmania.) When full, Lake Gordon has capacity of approximately 12,400 gigalitres (10.1×10^{6} acre⋅ft), making Lake Gordon the largest lake in Australia. The surface area of the lake is 27,800 hectares (69,000 acres), the equivalent of twenty-five times the amount of water in Port Jackson, and is drawn from a catchment area of 2,014 square kilometres (778 sq mi). The single controlled spillway is capable of discharging 175 cubic metres per second (6,200 cu ft/s).

Approximately 48 arch dams have been built in Australia and only nine have double curvature. The Gordon Dam is almost twice the height of the next highest arch dam, Tumut Pondage. The dam was designed with Sergio Guidici as the chief engineer. He went on to be involved with the design of the Crotty Dam in the West Coast Range, one of the last significant dams created by Hydro Tasmania during its dam-building era. The arch shell varies in thickness from top to bottom, 2.75 to 17.7 metres (9.0 to 58.1 ft).

In 1980, the dam was added to the now defunct Register of the National Estate; and in 2001, the dam was listed as a National Engineering Landmark by Engineers Australia as part of its Engineering Heritage Recognition Program. A 2.7-metre-wide (8.9 ft) pedestrian bridge crosses the dam wall.

=== Reservoir ===
Holding 12,400 gigalitres (10.1×10^{6} acre⋅ft) and covering 27,800 hectares (69,000 acres), Lake Gordon is Tasmania's largest lake. It provides approximately 60% of the water used in the Gordon Power Station, and water diverted from the 24,133-hectare (59,630-acre) Lake Pedder, via the McPartlan Pass Canal, (Note: The canal is located at 42°50′51″S 146°11′45″E.) provides the residual. After use in the Gordon Power Station, water from Lake Gordon then exits through the Gordon Dam and into the Gordon River. Together, the Gordon and Pedder lakes form the biggest water catchment and storage system in Australia.

== Hydroelectric power station ==
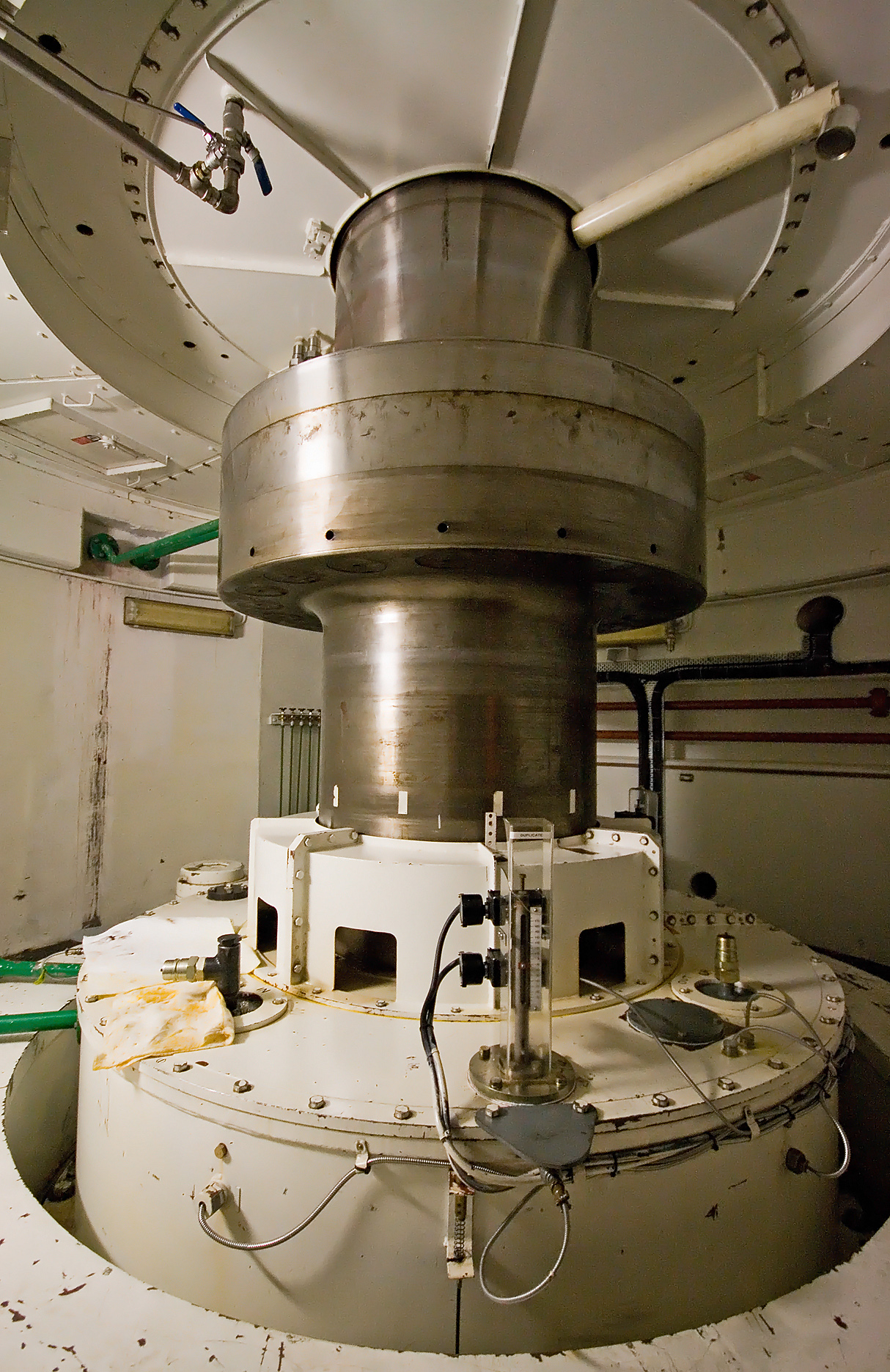
Shaft connecting the third turbine to the rotor. The bearing at the top supports the load of the shaft and turbine, the bottom bearing is primarily for alignment.

The Gordon Power Station (also known as the Gordon River Power Station) is the largest conventional hydroelectric power station in Tasmania. Opened in 1978 and refurbished in 2024, the station is located underground, approximately 180 metres (590 ft) below the surface of the switch yard. Water from the dam descends 183 metres (600 ft) underground into its power station, where three 144-megawatt (193,000 hp) Francis-type turbines generate up to 432 megawatts (579,000 hp) of power, covering about 13% of the electricity demand of Tasmania. The first two turbines were commissioned in 1978, before the third was commissioned in 1988.

The station's output is fed from each machine by 18 kV aluminium busbars to the surface switchyard then passes through three 18/220 kV power transformers and 220 kV outdoor switchgear to TasNetworks' transmission grid. The switchyard also houses 22 kV apparatus used for power supply to the station and to the local community. The power station's average annual output is 1,389 gigawatt-hours (5,000 TJ).

== History ==
In 1963, the federal government provided a $5 million grant to Tasmania's Hydro-Electric Commission to build the 80-kilometre (50 mi) Gordon River Road from Maydena into the Gordon River area in the South West Wilderness region. Construction was underway by 1964, and in early 1967, Eric Reece, (Note: Reece subsequently earned the epithet of Electric Eric, in view of his stanch support of hydroelectricity.) the Premier of Tasmania, formally announced plans to flood the natural Lake Pedder and the legislation was debated in the Tasmanian Parliament several days later. A small environmental movement was formed, which mobilised in the 1980s to stop the proposed Franklin River Dam.

In 1972, in addition to the Gordon Dam, Reece controversially approved three new dams, the Scotts Peak, Edgar, and the Serpentine dams, and hence, the flooding of Lake Pedder, despite a determined environmental protest movement and a blank cheque offer from his Labor colleague, Prime Minister Gough Whitlam, to preserve the area. Reece refused Whitlam's offer, stating that he would 'not have the Federal Government interfering with the sovereign rights of Tasmania.' Reece retrospectively commented:

There was a National Park out there, but I can't remember exactly where it was ... at least, it wasn't of substantial significance in the scheme of things. The thing that was significant was that we had to double the output of power in this state in 10 years in order [to] supply the demands of industry and the community. And this was the scheme that looked as though it could do a greater part of [the] job for us.

Environmental protests and political lobbying continued. It was claimed that the Tasmanian Government had contravened the National Parks and Wildlife Act (TAS), resulting in the passage of retrospective legislation that confirmed construction of the three dams could continue. Reece commented at the time, "As far as Lake Pedder is concerned, the sooner they fill it up the better."

Gordon Dam bridge
- Coordinates: 42°43′49″S 145°58′35″E
- Carries: Pedestrians

Characteristics
- Width: 2.7 m (8 ft 10 in)

Location
- Interactive map of Gordon Dam bridge

The Scotts Peak, Edgar and Serpentine dams were completed in the early 1970s, and the Gordon Dam completed in 1974. In 1978, electricity generation began at the Gordon Power Station, with two generators; and a third generator was added in 1988.

The completed Gordon Dam was the only dam built on the Gordon River, despite the support of Tasmanian politicians such as Reece, Robin Gray, and others to build the Franklin Dam across the lower Gordon River, however they were subject to political protest led by The Wilderness Society, most notably the controversity arising out of the proposed damming of the Franklin during the early 1980s. In 1983, Prime Minister Bob Hawke intervened and overturned a decision by the Tasmanian Government to dam the lower Gordon. When the Tasmanian Government refused to halt work in the UNESCO-listed World Heritage Area, the Australian Government successfully sought a ruling in the High Court of Australia in Commonwealth v Tasmania. The lower Gordon was not dammed. Subsequent opposition in the 1990s to restore Lake Pedder failed after a Tasmanian Parliamentary inquiry.

In 2015, Gordon Dam was the location for establishing a new world record for the world's highest basketball shot, broadcast via YouTube channel How Ridiculous, though this record has since been surpassed.

=== 2015–2016 Tasmanian energy crisis ===
Due to an extreme drought in 2015 and the untimely failure of the related Basslink connector, in March 2016, electricity production needs drained Lake Gordon to its minimum operating level. The water level fell 45 metres (148 ft) to a record low of six per cent capacity. Pictures document the dramatic effect. After repair of Basslink and record rainfalls, by July 2017, Lake Gordon had swelled by 20 metres (66 ft) over ten months.

== Gallery ==
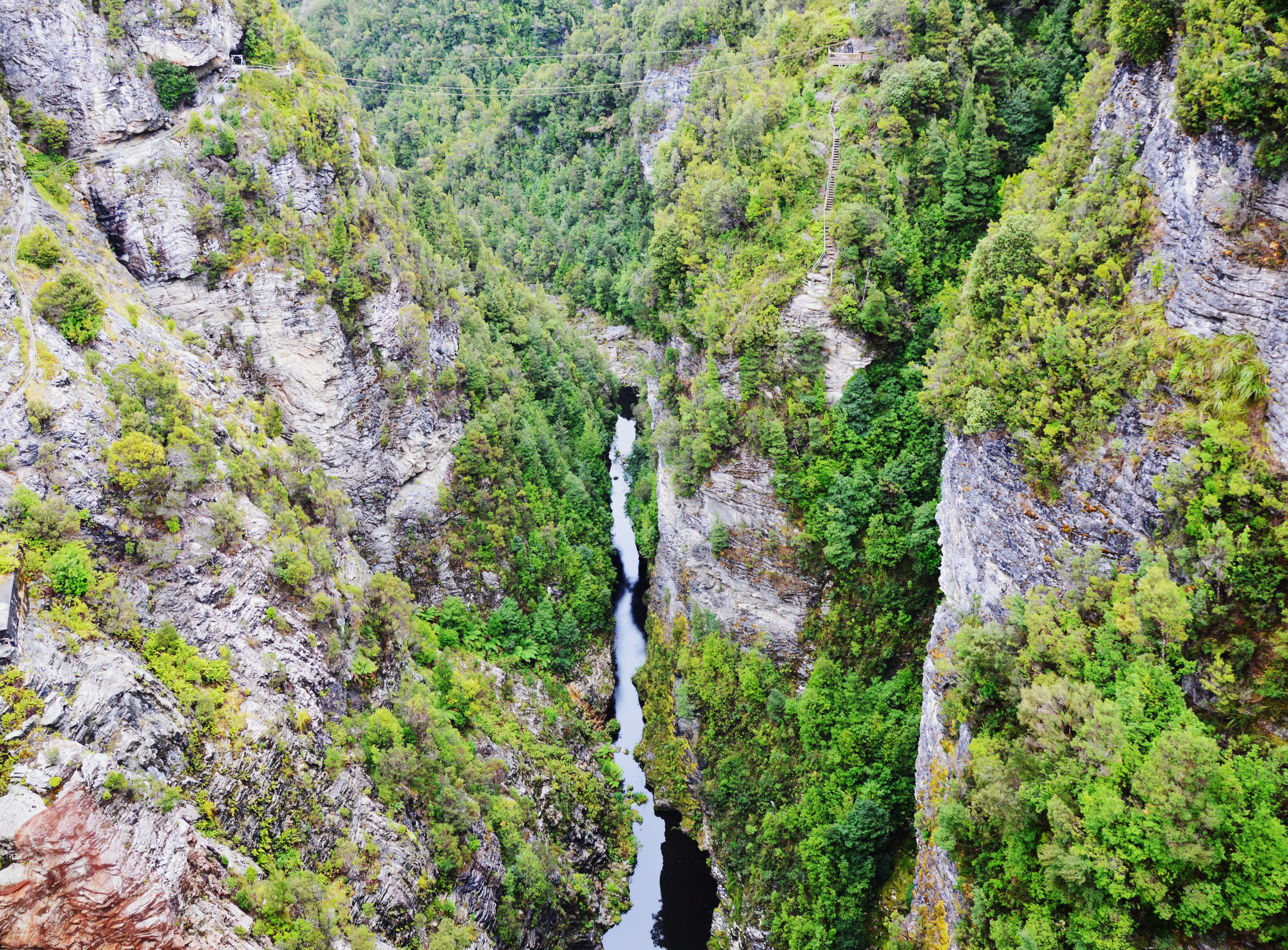
An aerial image of the Gordon River, below the dam wall

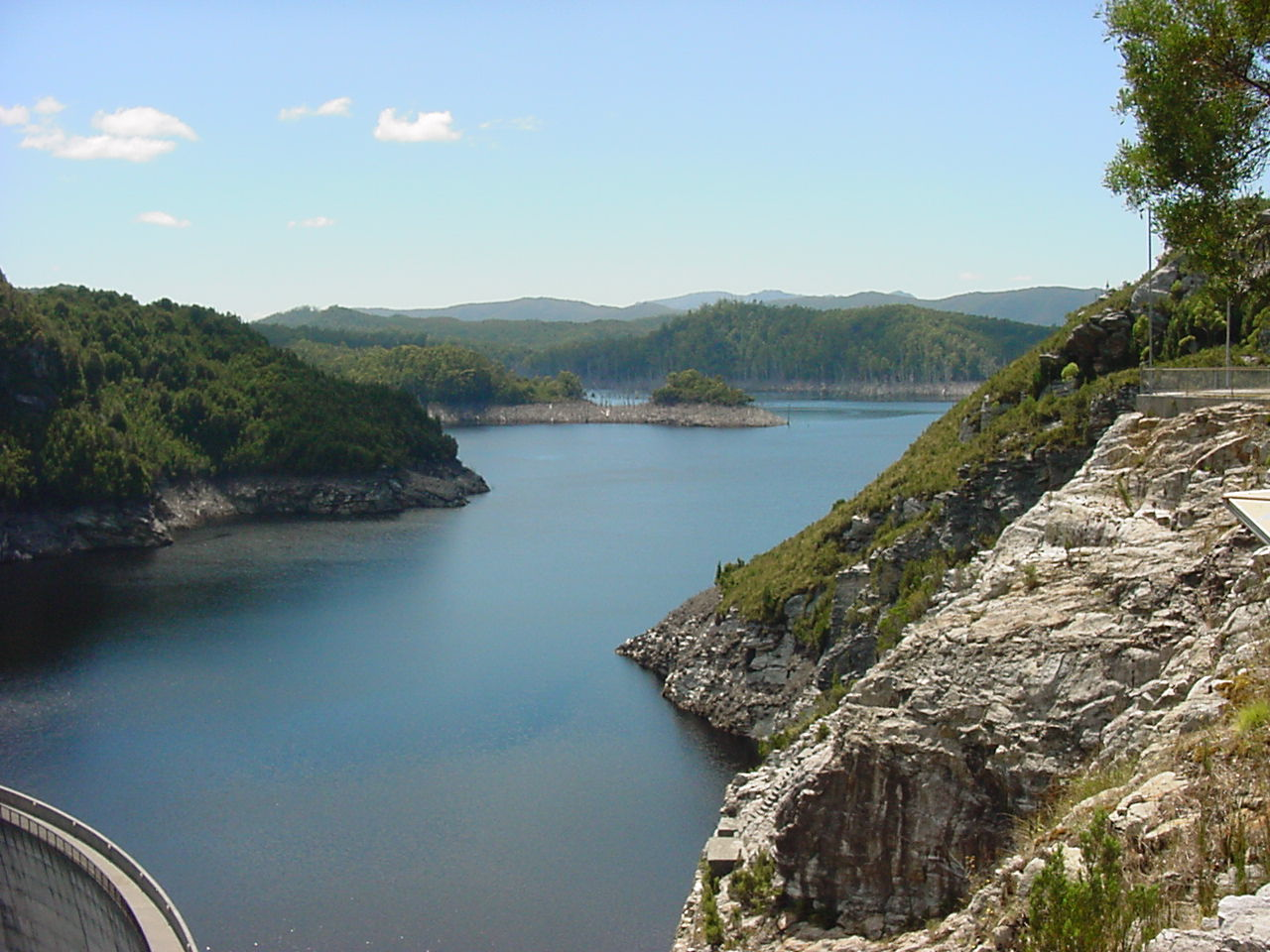
The reservoir in 2001

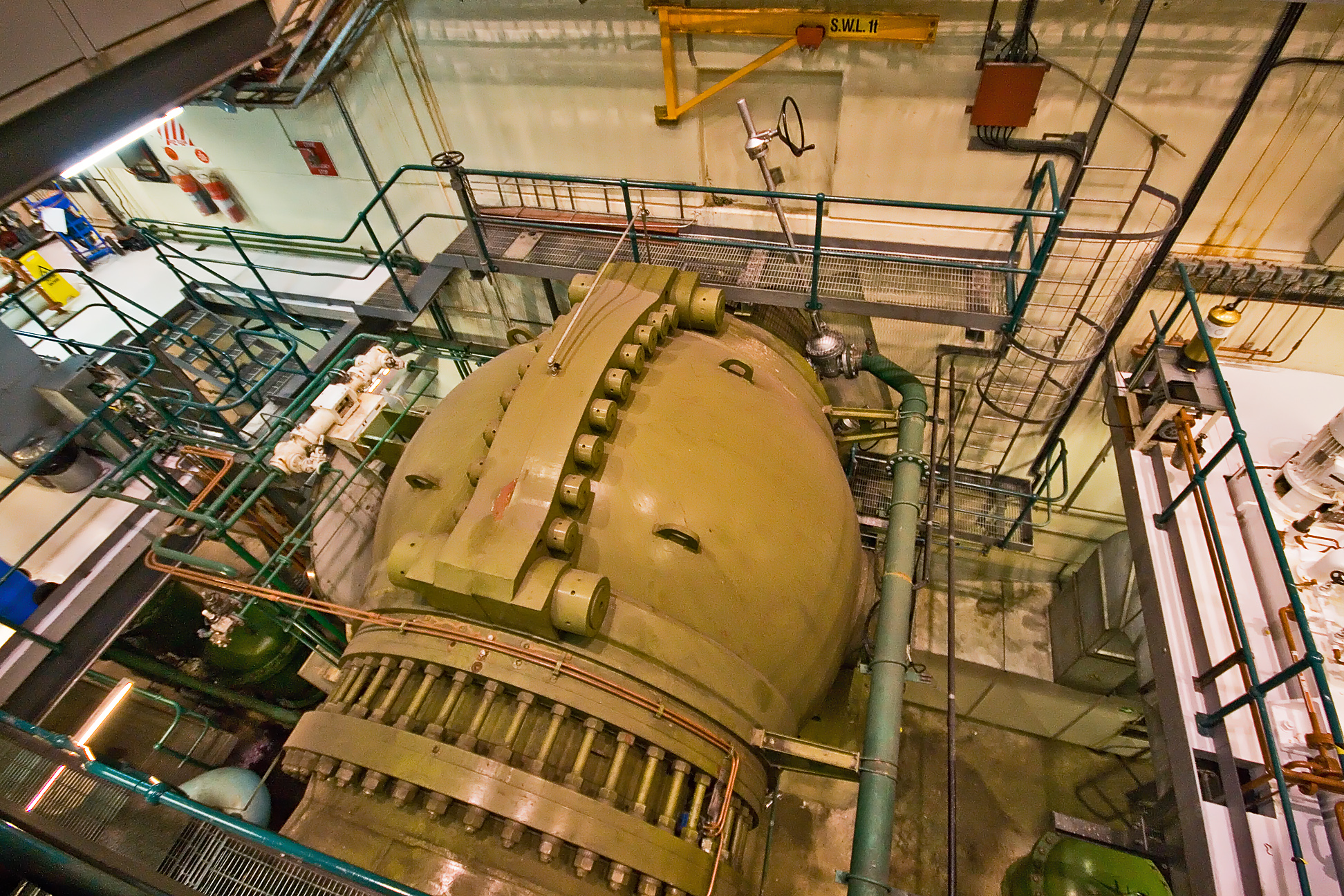
Main shut off rotary ball valve for Turbine No. 2

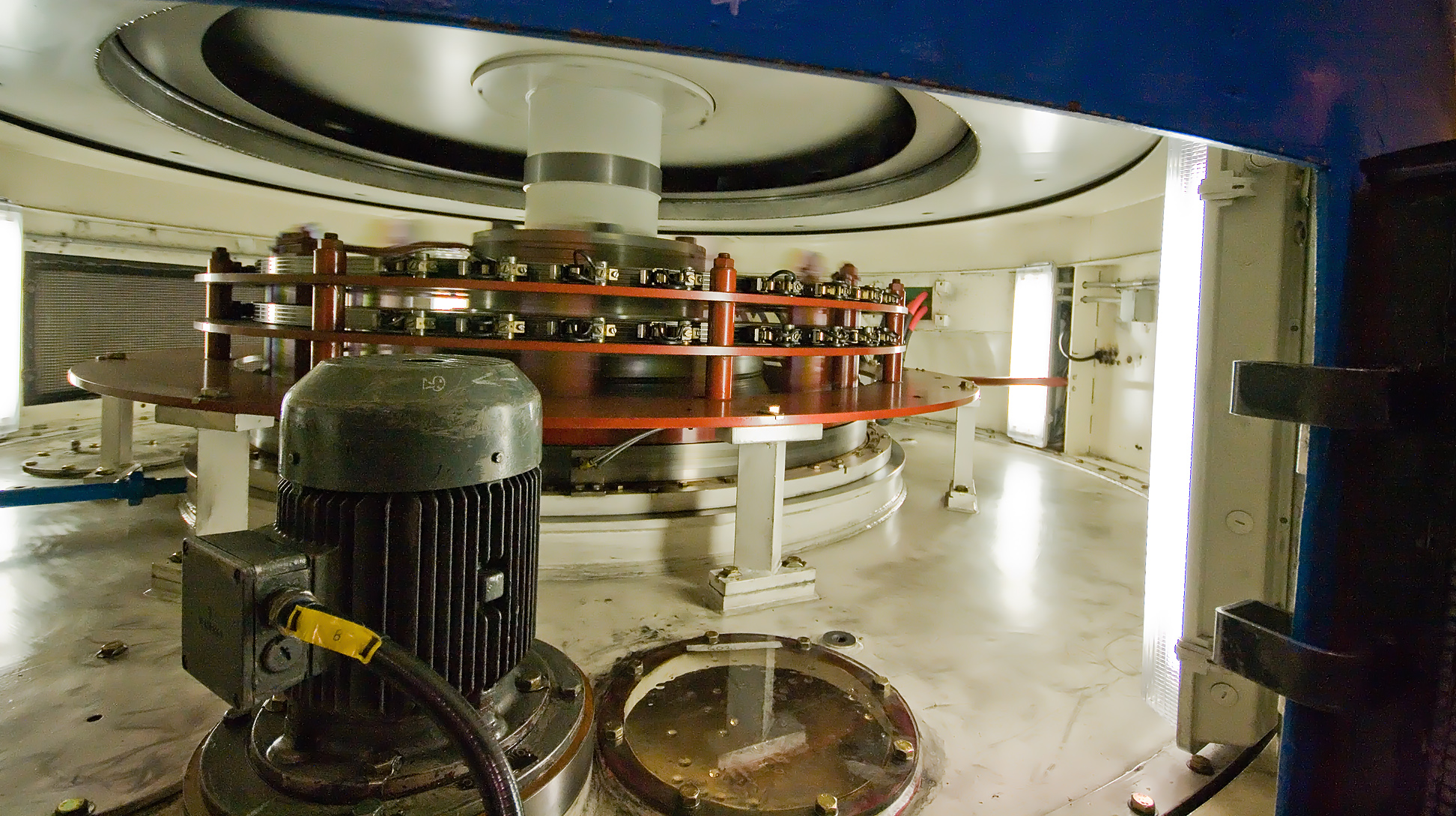
Slip rings for Turbine No. 2

== See also ==
- List of reservoirs and dams in Tasmania
- List of lakes in Tasmania
- Franklin Dam controversy
