= Olegas Truchanas =

Australian photographer

- Born: 22 September 1923; Šiauliai, Lithuania
- Died: 6 January 1972 (aged 48); South West Tasmania, Australia
- Occupation: Photographer
- Known for: His photography helped to raise public awareness of the environmental importance of south-west Tasmania

Olegas Truchanas (22 September 1923 – 6 January 1972) was a Lithuanian-Australian conservationist and nature photographer.

He was a key figure in the attempt to stop the damming of the ecologically sensitive Lake Pedder in South West Tasmania by the Hydro Electricity Commission. His photographs, along with those of his protégé, Peter Dombrovskis, helped raise public awareness of the importance of the south-west Tasmania.

== Early life ==
Truchanas was born in Šiauliai, Lithuania. In 1941, he graduated from the Šiauliai Gymnasium. After the 1945 fall of Lithuania to the USSR, he fled to Munich, Germany. Though he enrolled in a law degree at UNRRA University, he was sent to a displaced persons camp and subsequently migrated to Tasmania in 1948.

Upon arriving in Tasmania, Truchanas worked for a zinc company in Hobart for two years, which was necessary under Australian migration law of the time. During that time, he began to take an interest in the Tasmanian wilderness.

== South West Tasmania ==
In 1958, Truchanas became the first person in recorded history to kayak the length of the dangerous Serpentine and Gordon Splits.

Most of Truchanas' early photographs were lost when his house was destroyed in the Hobart bushfire in 1967. However, over the next five years, he substantially rebuilt his collection of photos of the Lake Pedder area. As a clerk temporarily employed by the Hydro Electricity Commission, Truchanas was forbidden to speak about the increasing controversy surrounding the impending damming. His photographs played an important role in the publicity of the campaign. He was once quoted as stating "This vanishing world is beautiful beyond our dreams and contains in itself rewards and gratifications never found in an artificial landscape or man-made objects."

After taking what is now among the only remaining records of the pre-dam era Lake Pedder, Truchanas realised that the campaign was lost. He turned his attention to the Pieman, Gordon and Franklin Rivers.

In 1972, Truchanas drowned in the Gordon River after he slipped and fell into the current. His body was found by Dombrovskis, trapped beneath a log.

== Legacy ==
He lived to see the failure of the Lake Pedder and Pieman River campaigns although the actual damming did not occur until after his death. The campaign to stop the Franklin Dam and thus save the Gordon and Franklin rivers, was ultimately successful. After his death, a book with his work was published. With an initial print of 5,000 copies, eight further editions sold out.

Truchanas' and Dombrovskis' stories were depicted in a 2003 documentary, Wildness. In the same year a tribute, The Forest of Stumps by artist Geoff Parr, was exhibited at Hobart's Ten Days on the Island arts festival. It included a number of Truchanas' photographs.

Some of his photographs have been turned into postage stamps by Australia Post. A canoe used by Truchanas, and several other possessions, is part of the National Library of Australia's National Historical Collection. Singer-songwriter Bruce Watson wrote in his song Olegas, "the Franklin runs today because of what [Truchanas] began."

In 2007 IHOS Music Theatre and Opera staged excerpts from a major opera, Olegas, based on the life of Olegas Truchanas. His work appeared in the 2013 photographic exhibition Into the Wild: Wilderness Photography in Tasmania at the Queen Victoria Museum and Art Gallery in Launceston, Tasmania and in the catalogue of this exhibition. His collection of colour slides, as well as an archival collection, was donated to the Queen Victoria Museum and Art Gallery in 2014. His work also appeared in the 2020 QVMAG exhibition Natural Visions: the camera and conservation.

== See also ==
- Death of a River Guide
- David Tatnall (photographer)
