= King William Range =

Mountain range in Tasmania, Australia

Coordinates: 42°18′S 146°08′E

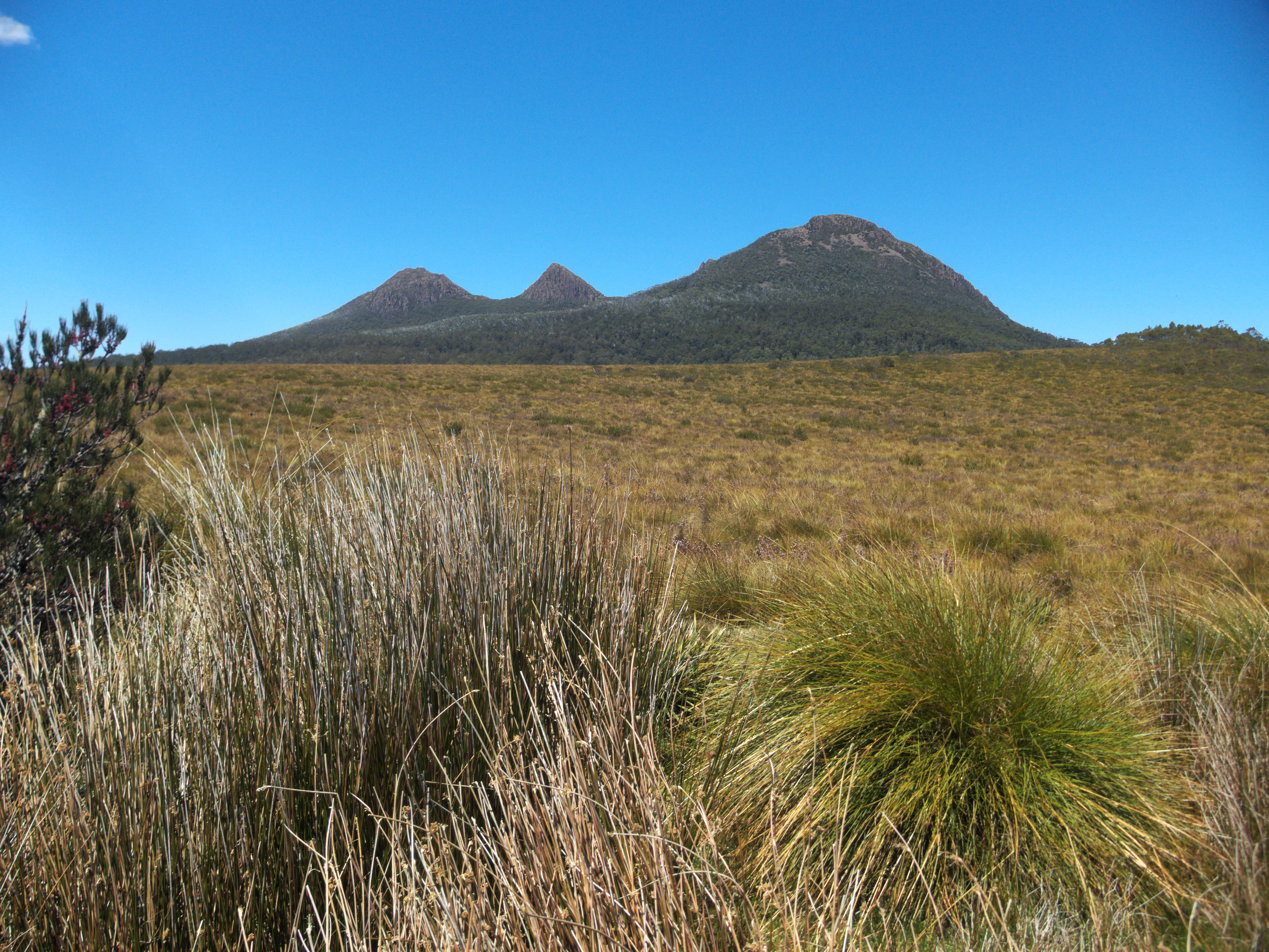
- Three peaks of the King William Range seen from the Lyell Highway

Geography
- Country: Australia
- State: Tasmania
- Region: South West Wilderness

The King William Range is a mountain range in the South West Wilderness, Tasmania, Australia. It is situated south of the Lyell Highway and Derwent Bridge. It is the source of the Gordon River catchment.

Despite older designations of a single peak, it has three peaks named Mount King William, designated I, II and III.

The mountains that are over 1100m high in the range include:

- Loddon Bluff (1220m)
- Mt King William I (1324m)
- Slatters Peak (1300m)
- Mt King William II (1363m)
- Mt Hobhouse (1222m)
- Wentworth Hills (1244m)

In some mapping of Tasmania it is included in the Central Highlands region, and it is also in proximity to Hydro Tasmania impoundments in the highlands.

== See also ==
- List of mountains in Australia § Tasmania
