= Gordon River =

River in Tasmania, Australia

Gordon
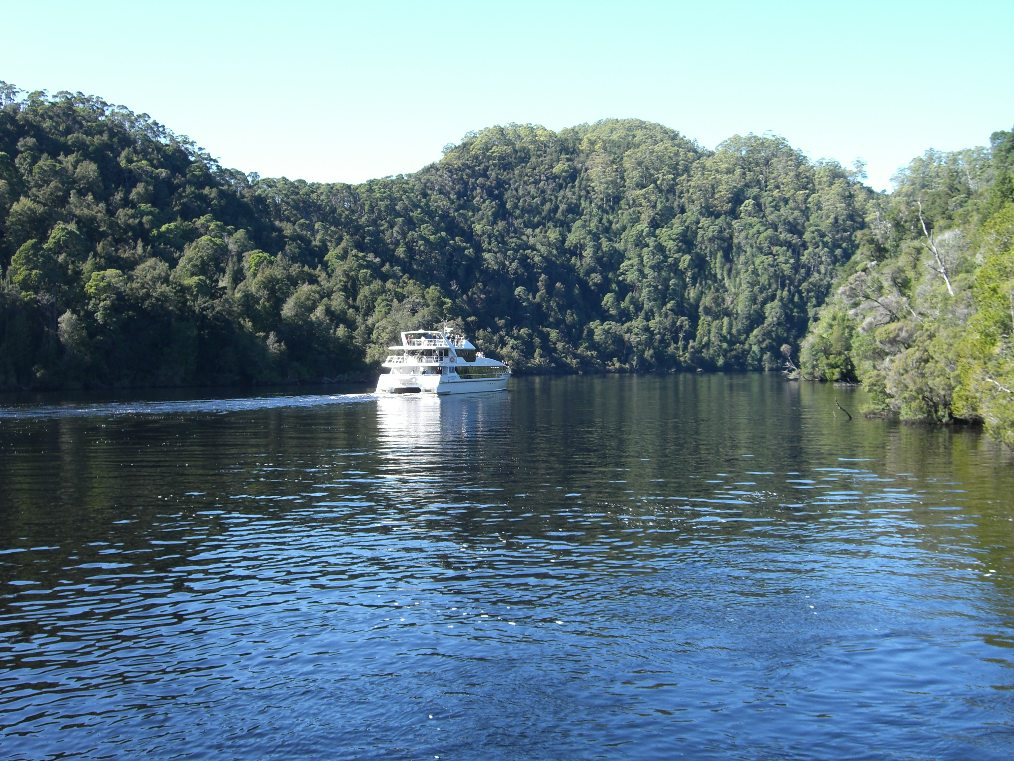
- A tour boat on the lower Gordon River

- Location of the Gordon River mouth in Tasmania

Location
- Country: Australia
- State: Tasmania
- Region: Central Highlands, South-west, Western

Physical characteristics
- Source: King William Range
  - location: Franklin-Gordon Wild Rivers National Park
  - coordinates: 42°18′48″S 146°12′56″E
  - elevation: 570 m (1,870 ft)
- Mouth: Southern Ocean
  - location: Wrights Bay
  - coordinates: 42°25′57″S 145°30′25″E
  - elevation: 0 m (0 ft)
- Length: 172 km (107 mi)

Basin features
- Tributaries
  - left: Adams River, Serpentine River, Albert River, Orange River, Olga River, Sprent River, Franklin River
  - right: Gell River, Boyes River, Pokana River, Holley River, Smith River, Denison River, Spence River
- Reservoir: Lake Gordon

The Gordon River is a major perennial river located in the central highlands, south-west, and western regions of Tasmania, Australia.

== Course and features ==
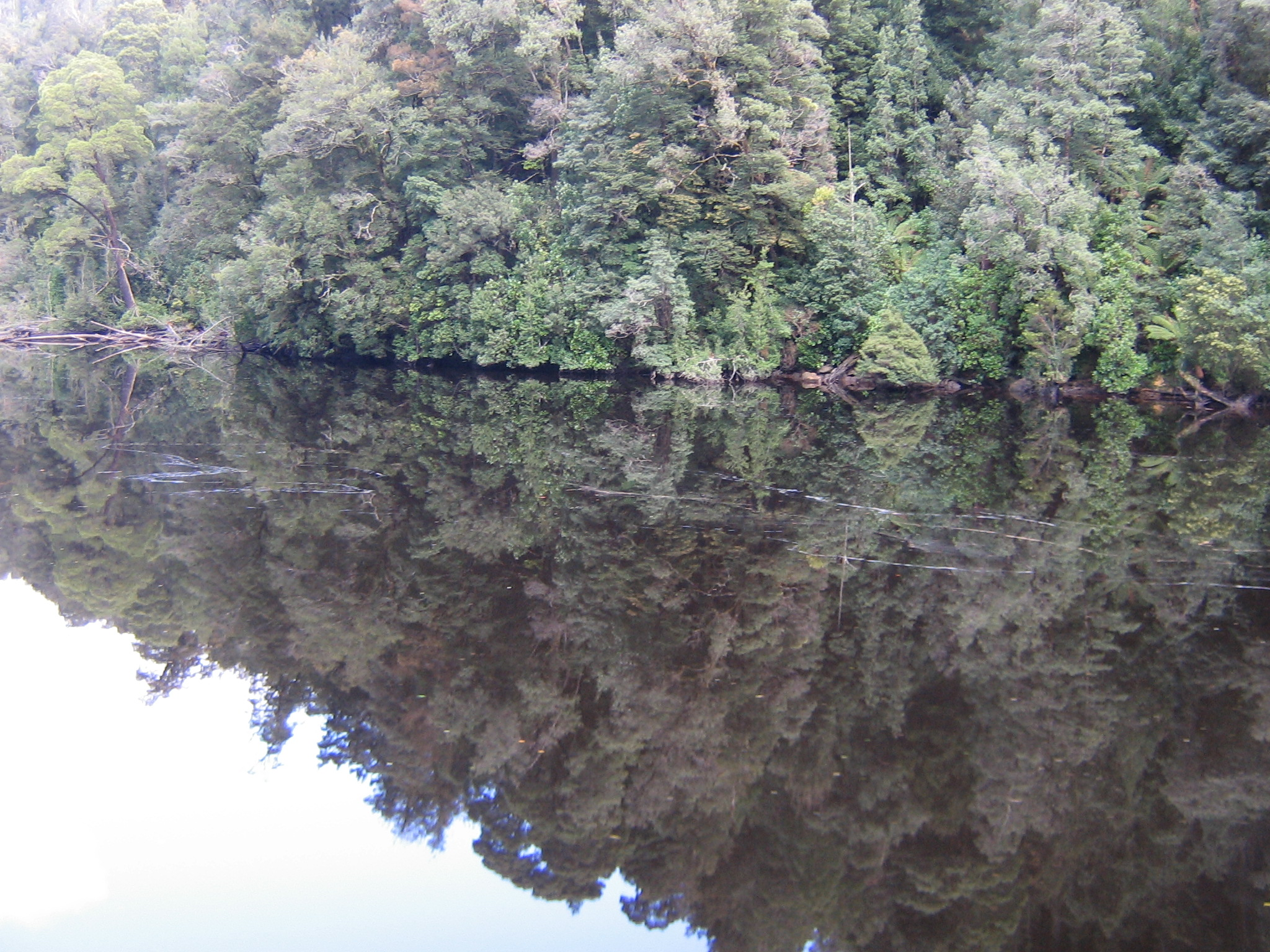
Reflections of the forest on the Gordon River.

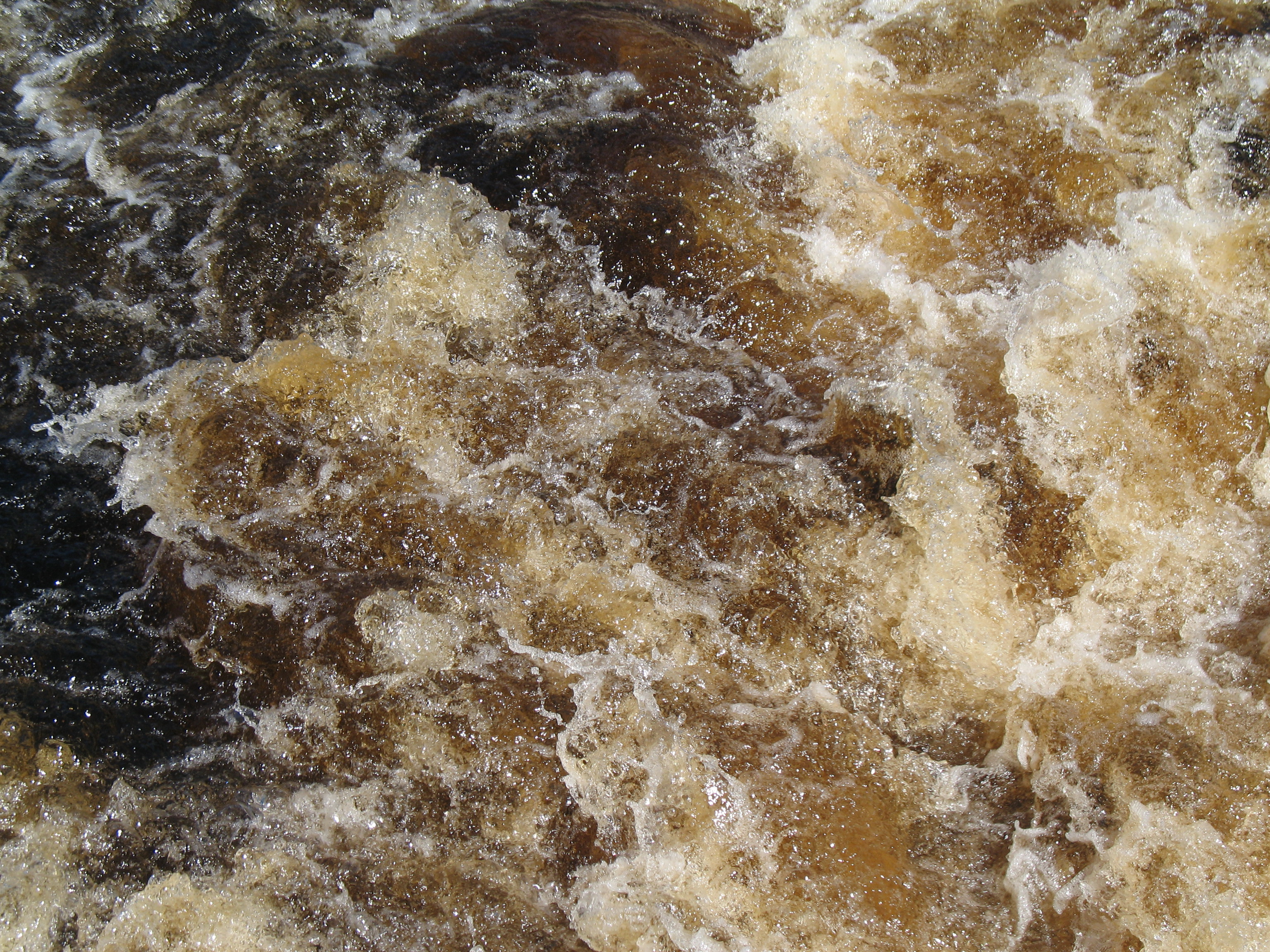
The "weak tea" coloured water of the Gordon River.

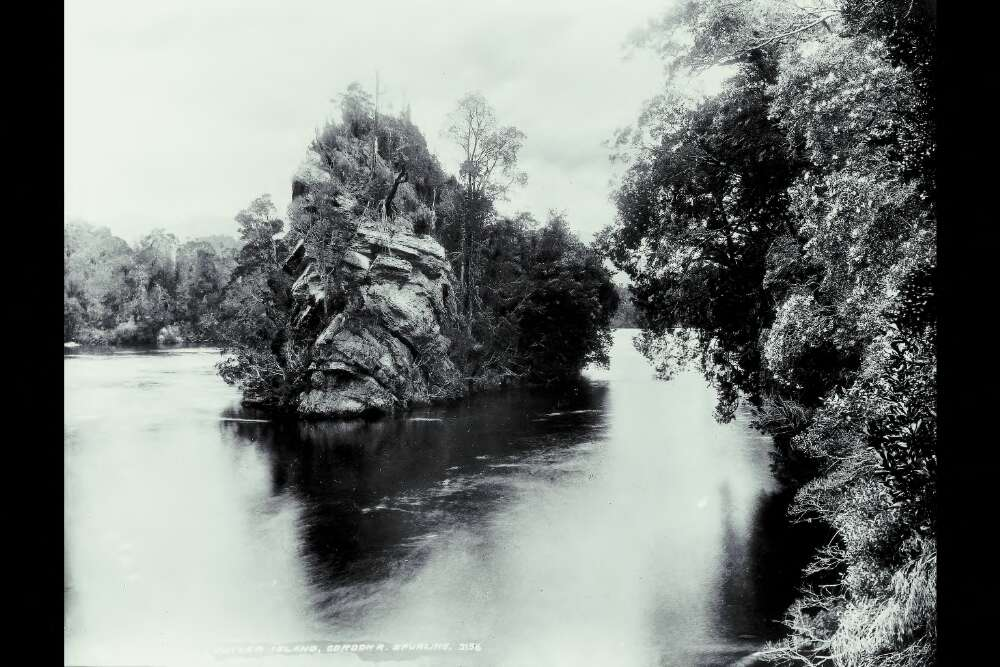
Butler Island on the lower Gordon River

The Gordon River rises below Mount Hobhouse in the Franklin-Gordon Wild Rivers National Park draining the eastern slopes of the King William Range. The river flows generally south and to the west of the Gordon Range before flowing west through the Gordon Gap and spilling into Lake Gordon, an impounded reservoir created by damming the Gordon at the Gordon Dam. Together with water fed from Lake Pedder, the principal purpose of the reservoir is for generation of hydro-electricity at the Gordon Power Station.

Flowing from east to west through Lake Gordon, the river continues west, passing through the Gordon Splits, a series of gorges once considered impassable until 1958 when Olegas Truchanas, a conservationist and nature photographer, was the first person to navigate the Gordon River in a kayak. The river flows north by west and then due north and finally due west as it reaches its mouth and empties into Macquarie Harbour at Wrights Bay.

From source to mouth, the river is joined by 25 tributaries including the Gell, Boyes, Pokana, Holley, Adams, Serpentine, Albert, Orange, Smith, Denison, Olga, Sprent, Franklin, and the Spence rivers.

The river descends 570 metres (1,870 ft) over its 172-kilometre (107 mi) course; much of which is located in an uninhabited wilderness area, contained with the Franklin-Gordon Wild Rivers National Park and Southwest National Park. The lower part of the Gordon River is part of the Tasmanian Wilderness World Heritage Area and contains a cold-climate rainforest and rare trees. As with many rivers in western Tasmania, the water is fresh and drinkable, yet has the colour of weak tea due to the absorption of tannin from button grass growing in the catchment area.

Additional dams were proposed for the lower part of the river. However, these plans were changed as a result of significant opposition and public opinion. In particular, the Franklin Dam was proposed just downstream of the junction with the Franklin River, and would have flooded much of both rivers. It was a major political and environmental issue in the 1980s.

Boat excursions to the lower Gordon River from Macquarie Harbour are popular with tourists in Strahan. Seaplane flights depart Strahan during the warmer months and include an out landing on the Gordon River (usually a duration of one hour).

== See also ==
- Commonwealth v Tasmania
- King River
- List of rivers of Australia § Tasmania
