= Third Rockliff ministry =

Current Cabinet of Tasmania (2025-)

Third Rockliff Ministry
- Cabinet of Tasmania

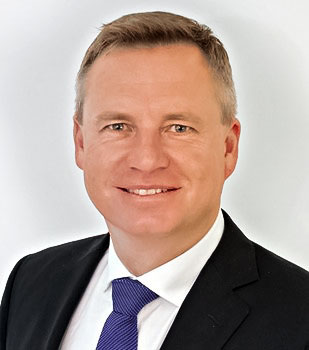
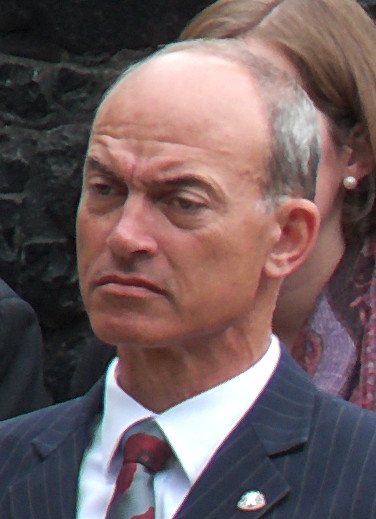
- Jeremy Rockliff (Premier) Guy Barnett (Deputy Premier)
- Date formed: 11 August 2025

People and organisations
- Governor: Barbara Baker; Caroline Wells
- Premier: Jeremy Rockliff
- Premier's history: Premiership of Jeremy Rockliff
- Deputy Premier: Guy Barnett
- No. of ministers: 11
- Member party: Liberal; Independent (1)
- Status in legislature: Minority government 14 / 35
- Opposition cabinet: Willie shadow ministry
- Opposition party: Labor
- Opposition leader: Josh Willie

History
- Election: 2025
- Legislature term: 2025–2029
- Predecessor: Second Rockliff ministry

The Third Rockliff ministry is the current cabinet of Tasmania, sworn-in on 11 August 2025. The cabinet is in minority government.

== Current composition ==
Party	Minister	Portfolio	Electorate
Executive government
	Jeremy Rockliff	Premier	Braddon HA
	Guy Barnett	Deputy Premier; Attorney-General; Minister for Justice, Corrections and Rehabilitation; Minister for Small Business, Trade and Consumer Affairs; Minister for Environment and Climate Change	Lyons HA
	Eric Abetz	Treasurer; Leader of the House; Minister for Macquarie Point Urban Renewal	Franklin HA
	Bridget Archer	Minister for Health, Mental Health and Wellbeing; Minister for Aboriginal Affairs; Minister for Ageing	Bass HA
	Gavin Pearce	Minister for Primary Industries and Water; Minister for Veterans' Affairs	Braddon HA
	Felix Ellis	Minister for Police, Fire and Emergency Management; Minister for Business, Industry and Resources; Minister for Skills and Jobs; Minister for Innovation, Science and the Digital Economy	Braddon HA
	Roger Jaensch	Minister for Arts; Minister for Community and Multicultural Affairs; Minister for Racing; Minister for Tourism, Hospitality and Events	Braddon HA
	Kerry Vincent	Minister for Infrastructure and Transport; Minister for Local Government; Minister for Housing and Planning	Prosser LC
	Jo Palmer	Minister for Education; Minister for Children and Youth; Minister for Disability Services; Minister for Women and the Prevention of Family and Sexual Violence	Rosevears LC
	Nick Duigan	Minister for Energy and Renewables; Minister for Parks and Heritage; Minister for Sport	WindermereLC
	Rob Fairs	Assistant Minister for Youth Engagement and Sport	Bass HA
Parliamentary offices
	Tania Rattray	Leader of the Government in the Tasmanian Legislative Council	McIntyre LC
Previous members
	Madeleine Ogilvie (2025-26)	Minister for Innovation, Science and the Digital Economy; Minister for Environment; Minister for Arts and Heritage; Minister for Community and Multicultural Affairs	Clark HA
	Jane Howlett (2025-26)	Minister for Racing; Minister for Tourism, Hospitality and Events; Minister for Women and the Prevention of Family and Sexual Violence	Lyons HA
