= Cabinet of Tasmania =

Executive body in control of the Tasmanian Government

- Coat of arms of Tasmania

Cabinet overview
- Formed: 1856 (170 years ago)
- Type: Executive body within the Tasmanian Government
- Jurisdiction: Tasmania
- Headquarters: Executive Building, 15 Murray Street
- Website: Cabinet of Tasmania webpage

The Cabinet of Tasmania is the senior decision-making and executive body within the Tasmanian Government. The Cabinet is a body within the Executive Council of Tasmania, which exists to advise the governor of Tasmania on the matters of government. Decisions made by Cabinet do not have legal effect on their own, and must be approved by the governor in a meeting of the Executive Council, of which all cabinet ministers are members and the governor presides. However, under the conventions of responsible government, the governor generally rubber stamps all decisions of the Cabinet with little debate. The premier of Tasmania appoints members of the Cabinet from the membership of both houses of the Parliament of Tasmania, who are sworn in by the governor. The premier presides over the Cabinet, with the entirety of a premier's ministry having the ability to contribute in debate, and decisions taken collectively. Members of Cabinet are bound by the convention of collective responsibility, forbidding cabinet ministers from speaking negatively about decisions made by Cabinet in quorum, even if a minister disagrees with the policy.

Cabinet minutes (meetings) are confidential, and therefore ministers are forbidden from

speaking of deliberations to be brought to a future cabinet meeting, or speaking of the agenda of a cabinet meeting during said deliberations. Ministers are also not permitted to speak of policy outside of their portfolio area, unless the premier has granted prior approval.

The Cabinet may be composed of ministers, assistant ministers, and parliamentary secretaries. Higher-ups in the public service are also occasionally requested to attend. Under Section 22 of the Tasmanian Constitution, it is unconstitutional for a person to serve in the Cabinet whilst not a member of parliament.

The current cabinet of Tasmania is the Third Rockliff ministry

== Current cabinet ==
Party	Minister	Portfolio	Electorate
Executive government
	Jeremy Rockliff	Premier	Braddon HA
	Guy Barnett	Deputy Premier; Attorney-General; Minister for Justice, Corrections and Rehabilitation; Minister for Small Business, Trade and Consumer Affairs; Minister for Environment	Lyons HA
	Eric Abetz	Treasurer; Leader of the House; Minister for Macquarie Point Urban Renewal	Franklin HA
	Bridget Archer	Minister for Health, Mental Health and Wellbeing; Minister for Aboriginal Affairs; Minister for Ageing	Bass HA
	Gavin Pearce	Minister for Primary Industries and Water; Minister for Veterans' Affairs	Braddon HA
	Felix Ellis	Minister for Police, Fire and Emergency Management; Minister for Business, Industry and Resources; Minister for Skills and Jobs; Minister for Innovation, Science and Digital Economy	Braddon HA
	Roger Jaensch	Minister for the Arts; Minister for Community and Multicultural Affairs; Minister for Racing; Minister for Tourism, Hospitality and Events	Braddon HA
	Kerry Vincent	Minister for Infrastructure; Minister for Local Government; Minister for Housing and Planning	Prosser LC
	Jo Palmer	Minister for Education; Minister for Children and Youth; Minister for Disability Services; Minister for Women and the Prevention of Family Violence	Rosevears LC
	Nick Duigan	Minister for Energy and Renewables; Minister for Parks; Minister for Sport	WindermereLC
	Rob Fairs	Assistant Minister for Youth Engagement and Sport	Bass HA
Parliamentary offices
	Tania Rattray	Leader of the Government in the Tasmanian Legislative Council	McIntyre LC
Previous members
	Madeleine Ogilvie (2025-26)	Minister for Innovation, Science and Digital Economy; Minister for Environment; Minister for Arts and Heritage; Minister for Community and Multicultural Affairs	Clark HA
	Jane Howlett (2025-26)	Minister for Racing; Minister for Tourism, Hospitality and Events; Minister for Women and the Prevention of Family Violence	Lyons HA

== Prior Cabinets ==
- Bartlett ministry (2008–11)
- Giddings ministry (2011–14)
- Hodgman ministry (2014–20)
- First Gutwein ministry (2020–21)
- Second Gutwein ministry (2021-22)
- First Rockliff ministry (2022-24)
- Second Rockliff ministry (2024-25)
