= List of Tasmanian government agencies =

Government in Tasmania is delivered by a number of agencies, grouped under areas of portfolio responsibility. Each portfolio is led by a government minister who is a member of the Parliament of Tasmania, appointed by the Governor as the representative of the Crown.

The agencies are principally grouped as eight departments, each led by a secretary or director-general and comprising a number of portfolios covering specific policy areas across the department and allocated statutory authorities, trading enterprises, boards, councils and other public bodies.

Agencies have varying levels of operational autonomy, and deliver one or more of frontline public services, administrative functions and law enforcement. Some are structured as for-profit corporations. Where there are multiple portfolios within a department, directors-general may be accountable to a number of ministers.

All agencies are identifiable by their corporate logo, which features in agency advertising, publications and correspondence, pictured right.

A list of articles on Tasmanian government agencies sorted alphabetically is available at Government agencies of Tasmania. The Tasmanian government maintains a list of agencies and their contact details at its website.

== Education, Children and Young People ==
The Department for Education, Children and Young People (DECYP) is the lead agency of the portfolio headed by the Minister for Education, Children and Youth.

The department is led by its secretary, Ginna Webster.

The Department of Education, Children and Young People is responsible for the following statutory and non-statutory bodies:

- Office of the Education Registrar
- Teachers Registration Board
- Tasmanian Assessment Standards and Certification (TASC)
- Government Education and Training International (GETI)
- Ashley Youth Detention Centre
- Community Justice Justice
- Libraries Tasmania
- Allport Library and Museum of Fine Arts Management Committee
- Tasmanian Library Advisory Board
- State Library and Archives Trust
- Office of Safeguarding Children and Young People
- Non-government Schools Registration Board
- University of Tasmania Council
- Tasmanian Home Education Advisory Council
- Tasmanian Building and Construction Industry Training Board
- Aboriginal Education Services
- Adoptions and Permanency Service
- The Child Advocate
- Commissioner for Children and Young People
- Tasmanian Autism Diagnostic Service

== Health ==
The Department of Health (DoH) is the lead agency of the portfolio headed by the Minister for Health.

The department is led by its secretary, currently acting in the role, Michael Pervan.

The Department of Health is responsible for the following statutory and non-statutory bodies:

- Ambulance Tasmania
- Housing Tasmania
- Child Health and Parenting Service
- Mental Health, Alcohol and Drug Directorate
- Oral Health Services Tasmania

== Justice ==
The Department of Justice (DoJ) is the lead agency of the portfolio headed by the Attorney-General, the Minister for Justice, and the Minister for Corrections, and the Minister for Planning.

The department is led by its secretary, Kathrine Morgan-Wicks.

The Department of Justice is responsible for the following statutory and non-statutory bodies:

- Tasmanian Electoral Commission
- WorkCover Board
- Births, Deaths and Marriages
- Safe at Home
- WorkSafe Tasmania
- Tasmanian Industrial Commission
- Monetary Penalties Enforcement Service
- Consumer, Building and Occupational Services
- Tasmanian Planning Commission
- Equality Opportunity Tasmania
- Tasmanian Legal Aid
- Office of the Public Guardian
- Tasmanian Civil and Administrative Tribunal (TASCAT)

- Asbestos Compensation Stream
- Anti-Discrimination Stream
- Forest Practices Stream
- Mental Health Stream
- Resource Management & Planning Appeal Stream
- Health Practitioners Tribunal
- Workers Rehabilitation & Compensation Stream

- Tasmanian Prison Service
- Magistrates' Court of Tasmania

- Coroners Court of Tasmania

- Supreme Court of Tasmania

== Police, Fire and Emergency Management ==
The Department of Police, Fire and Emergency Management (DPFEM) is the lead agency of the portfolio headed by the Minister for Police and Emergency Management. The department does not have a lead secretary, with each agency reporting directly to the Minister.

The Department of Police, Fire and Emergency Management is responsible for the following statutory and non-statutory bodies:

- Forensic Science Service Tasmania (FSST)
- Tasmania Fire Service (TFS)
- Tasmania Police
- Tasmania State Emergency Service (SES)

== Premier and Cabinet ==
The Department of Premier and Cabinet (DPAC) is the central agency of the Tasmanian Government. The department provides a broad range of services to Cabinet, other members of Parliament, Government agencies and the community. DPAC is headed by the Premier, the Minister for Sport and Recreation, and the Minister for Aboriginal Affairs.

The department is led by its secretary, Jenny Gale.

- Aboriginal Heritage Tasmania
- Resilience and Recovery Tasmania
- Office of Local Government
- State Planning Office
- Service Tasmania
- Community and Disability Services

== Natural Resources and Environment ==
The Department of Natural Resources and Environment Tasmania (NRE Tas) is the lead agency of the portfolio headed by the Minister for Primary Industries and Water, and the Minister for Racing and Resources, supported by the Minister for Environment and Climate Change, and the Minister for Local Government.

The department is led by its secretary, John Whittington.

The Department of Natural Resources and Environment Tasmania is responsible for the following statutory and non-statutory bodies:

- Analytical Services Tasmania
- Tasmania Parks and Wildlife Service
- Office of Racing Integrity
- Biosecurity Tasmania

- Animal Health Laboratory

- Game Services Tasmania
- Inland Fisheries
- Royal Tasmanian Botanical Gardens
- Heritage Tasmania
- Land Titles Office
- Officer of the Valuer General
- Private Forests Tasmania
- Waste and Resource Recovery Board
- Environment Protection Authority

== Building Tasmania ==
Building Tasmania is the lead agency of the portfolio headed by the Minister for State Growth and the Minister for Energy, supported by the Minister for Tourism, Hospitality and Events, the Minister for Information Technology and Innovation, the Minister for the Arts, the Minister for Planning and Local Government, the Minister for Forestry, and the Minister for Building and Construction, the Minister for Infrastructure and the Minister for Mining, and the Parliamentary Secretary for Small Business.

The department is led by its secretary, Craig Limkin.

Building Tasmania is responsible for the following statutory and non-statutory bodies:

- Antarctic Tasmania
- Arts Tasmania
- Business Tasmania
- Events Tasmania
- Infrastructure Tasmania
- Metro Tasmania
- Mineral Resources Tasmania
- Office of the Coordinator-General
- Screen Tasmania
- State Roads
- Road User services
- Tasmanian Development Board
- Tasmanian Institute of Sport
- Tasmanian Museum & Art Gallery
- Tourism Tasmania
- Renewables, Climate and Future Industries Tasmania (RECFIT)

== Treasury and Finance ==
The Department of Treasury and Finance is the lead agency of the portfolio headed by the Treasurer.

The department is led by its secretary, Gary Swain.

The Department of Treasury and Finance is responsible for the following statutory and non-statutory bodies:

- Office of the Tasmanian Economic Regulator
- Retirement Benefits Fund
- State Grants Commission
- Tasmanian Liquor and Gaming Commission
- Tasmanian Public Finance Corporation (Tascorp)

== No department ==
The majority of these agencies are operated as state-owned businesses or independent statutory authorities.

- Forest Practices Authority
- Forestry Tasmania / Sustainable Timbers Tasmania
- Homes Tasmania
- Hydro Tasmania
- Metro Tasmania – de facto administered by SG
- Spirit of Tasmania
- Tasmanian Community Fund
- Tasmanian Institute of Agriculture
- Tasmanian Irrigation
- TasPorts
- TasRail
- TasWater
- West Coast Wilderness Railway

== See also ==
- Government of Tasmania
- Local government in Tasmania
