= Department of Environment, Parks, Heritage and the Arts =

Former Tasmanian government department

Department overview
- Formed: 9 August 2002
- Dissolved: 1 July 2009
- Type: Government department
- Jurisdiction: Tasmanian Government
- Status: Abolished
- Headquarters: 22 Elizabeth Street, Hobart
- Employees: 739 (30 June 2009)
- Annual budget: $93.7 million (2008-09 FY)
- Minister responsible: Michelle O'Byrne, Minister for Environment, Parks, Heritage and the Arts
- Department executive: Scott Gadd, Secretary
- Website: www.depha.tas.gov.au

The Department of Environment, Parks, Heritage and the Arts (DEPHA) was a government department of the Australian state of Tasmania, responsible for managing Tasmania's natural and cultural heritage.

On 1 July 2009, DEPHA was abolished and its parts amalgamated with the Department of Economic Development and Tourism and the Department of Primary Industries and Water.

== Responsibilities ==
DEPHA incorporated or had close ties to several government agencies and businesses, including:

- Aboriginal Heritage Tasmania
- Arts Tasmania
- Environment Protection Authority
- Heritage Tasmania
- Royal Tasmanian Botanical Gardens
- Tasmanian Museum and Art Gallery
- Tasmanian Parks and Wildlife Service
- Port Arthur Historic Site Management Authority
- Wellington Park Management Trust

== History ==
The department was established on 9 August 2002, and was called the Department of Tourism, Parks, Heritage and the Arts (DTPHA).

On 5 April 2006, the Environment Division of the Department of Primary Industries, Water and Environment was amalgamated with the department and the name was changed to the Department of Tourism, Arts and the Environment (DTAE).

On 12 February 2008, Tourism Tasmania and Events Tasmania were moved to the Department of Economic Development and the name was changed to the Department of Environment, Parks, Heritage and the Arts (DEPHA). (Note: The State Service (Restructuring) Order 2008 (Tasmania) provides for the amalgamation of government departments, including the merging Tourism Tasmania and Events Tasmania with the Department of Economic Development.)

In May 2009, it was reported that the department would be abolished, and the Government confirmed the report the following day.

On 1 July 2009, the department was formally abolished, with Arts Tasmania and the Tasmanian Museum and Art Gallery amalgamated with the Department of Economic Development and Tourism, while Aboriginal Heritage Tasmania, Heritage Tasmania, the Parks and Wildlife Service, the Royal Tasmanian Botanical Gardens and the Environment Division were amalgamated with the Department of Primary Industries and Water. (Note: The State Service (Restructuring) Order 2009 (Tasmania) provides for the restructuring of government departments, including transferring Arts Tasmania and the Tasmanian Museum and Art Gallery to the Department of Economic Development, Tourism and the Arts.)
