= Department of Economic Development, Tourism and the Arts =

Former Tasmanian government department

Department overview
- Formed: 18 September 1998
- Type: Government department
- Jurisdiction: Tasmanian Government
- Status: Amalgamated with the Department of State Growth
- Headquarters: 22 Elizabeth Street, Hobart
- Employees: 431 (30 June 2014)
- Annual budget: $95.1 million (2013-14 FY)
- Ministers responsible: Will Hodgman, Minister for Tourism, Hospitality and Events; Vanessa Goodwin, Minister for the Arts; Matthew Groom, Minister for State Growth
- Department executive: Kim Evans, Acting Secretary
- Website: www.development.tas.gov.au

The Department of Economic Development, Tourism and the Arts (DEDTA) was the Tasmanian Government department tasked with making Tasmania a prosperous, vibrant, and healthy community. The department's core mission was to lead industry and community development, implement marketing and development programs for Tasmanian tourism, and provide policy and planning for the arts and culture sectors.

DEDTA was the initial point of contact for companies wishing to establish, relocate, diversify, or expand in Tasmania. It facilitated connections between government entities and the private sector to market Tasmania's unique attributes, provided funding for events, artists, and arts organizations, supported the upkeep of the state's cultural heritage collections, and promoted opportunities for all Tasmanians to engage in sports, recreation, and physical activities.

On 1 July 2014, DEDTA was merged with the Department of State Growth.

== Responsibilities ==
The department was responsible for:

- Promoting investment, exports, and job creation.
- Supporting arts policy, funding advice, and promoting cultural activities.
- Maximising the contribution of tourism to economic growth.
- Improving health and wellbeing through sport and recreation initiatives.
- Advancing Tasmania's science and research capabilities.

== Structure ==
The department was organised into the following organisational groups:

- Economic Development: Focused on investment and job creation.
- Arts and Culture: Supported arts policy and cultural activities.
- Tourism Tasmania: Promoted Tasmania as a tourist destination.
- Sport and Recreation: Enhanced health and wellbeing through sport.
- Corporate Support: Ensured good governance and decision-making.

== Boards and Committees ==
The department worked with several boards and committees:

- Screen Tasmania Board: Provided funding recommendations for the screen industry, through Screen Tasmania.
- Tasmanian Arts Advisory Board: Offered arts policy and funding advice, through Arts Tasmania.
- Tasmanian Development Board: Focused on investment and employment creation.
- Tourism Tasmania Board: Led marketing and development programs for tourism.
- Tasmanian Museum and Art Gallery Board of Trustees: Managed the Tasmanian Museum and Art Gallery operations.

== History ==
The department was formed on 18 September 1998 from the amalgamation of Tasmania Development and Resources, Tourism Tasmania and parts of other government departments and was called the Department of State Development (DSD).

On 9 August 2002, Tourism Tasmania, Arts Tasmania, Events Tasmania, the Tasmanian Bicentenary Office and the Tasmanian Museum and Art Gallery were transferred to the Department of Tourism, Parks, Heritage and the Arts and the department was renamed the Department of Economic Development.

On 12 February 2008, Tourism Tasmania and Events Tasmania were transferred to the department which was renamed the Department of Economic Development and Tourism.

On 1 July 2009, Arts Tasmania and the Tasmanian Museum and Art Gallery were transferred to the department which was renamed the Department of Economic Development, Tourism and the Arts.

It operated until 1 July 2014, when it was amalgamated with the Department of State Growth.

Throughout its existence, DEDTA supported several major initiatives, including the reopening of the Tasmanian Museum and Art Gallery after a $30 million upgrade, supporting the dairy industry, and promoting the state's wine industry through international trade missions.

== See also ==
- Arts Tasmania
- Economy of Tasmania
- Sport in Tasmania
- Tourism Tasmania
