= TPWS =

TPWS may refer to:

- Tasmania Parks and Wildlife Service
- Train Protection & Warning System
- Terrain Proximity Warning System, see Ground proximity warning system
- Tyre Pressure Warning System, see Tire-pressure monitoring system
