= TAAB =

TAAB may refer to:

- Thick as a Brick, TAAB
- Thick as a Brick 2 or TAAB2
- Tasmanian Arts Advisory Board (TAAB), or Arts Tasmania, Australia
