= Bill London =

Australian rules footballer, born 1904

Personal information
- Full name: Walter Hollington London
- Born: 30 June 1904
- Died: 1 February 1968 (aged 63); Wynyard, Tasmania
- Original team: Sandringham
- Position: Full Forward

Playing career^{1}
Years	Club	Games (Goals)
1928	Melbourne	1 (1)
- ^{1} Playing statistics correct to the end of 1928.

Walter Hollington "Bill" London (30 June 1904 – 1 February 1968) was an Australian rules footballer who played with Melbourne in the Victorian Football League (VFL).

== Football ==
=== Sandringham (MAFA) ===
Recruited from the Sandringham Juniors Football Club that competed in the B Grade of the Metropolitan Amateur Football Association (MAFA) in 1928.

== Death ==
He died at the Spencer Hospital, in Wynyard, Tasmania, on 1 February 1968.
