= Fraud & e-Crime Investigation Services =

The Fraud & e-Crime Investigation Services is a division within the Operations Support Command of Tasmania Police which commenced operations on 1 September 2010.

The unit is based in Hobart and provides statewide support for the investigation of fraud and e-crime (computer crime) complaints. As well as direct support to current investigations, the unit provides support in the areas of training, intelligence, liaison, policy and legislative review. In the southern region the unit conducts all fraud and e-crime investigations, as opposed to supporting investigations conducted by the Criminal Investigation Branches in the Northern and Western Districts.

== Structure and staffing ==
The Hobart-based unit is headed by a detective senior sergeant and consists of two main teams: Investigations and Computer Forensics. A detective constable, not attached to either of these teams, provides support to the officer-in-charge with the training, intelligence, liaison, policy and legislative review functions.

In addition to the Hobart-based members, there are nominated fraud and e-crime investigators within the Criminal Investigation Branches of the Northern and Western Districts.

=== Investigations ===
The investigations team is headed by a detective sergeant and staffed by four detective constables. The team is responsible for all fraud and e-crime investigations in the southern region of the state and provides support to investigations conducted in the Northern and Western Districts.

=== Computer forensics ===
The computer forensics team provides computer and mobile telephone forensics support to all members of Tasmania Police. The team was previously attached to the Forensic Services Division, but moved to the new unit due to the overlap between computer forensics and e-crime investigations.
