= Tourism Tasmania =

Government agency of Tasmania, Australia

Tourism Tasmania is the Tasmanian government's tourism authority.

It regularly partners with the Tourism Industry Council Tasmania in issues related to policies and plans. In a number of governments, the Tasmanian Premier has also been Minister for Tourism.

== Re-incorporation ==
The Tasmanian Government Tourist Bureau had office in all the capital cities of the states of Australia before the Second World War.

By July 1987 the Department of Tourism was renamed from the Tasmanian Government Tourist Bureau to Tourism Tasmania.

In 1989 Tourism Tasmania was amalgamated with the Department of Sport and Recreation to become the Department of Tourism, Sport and Recreation.

In 1997 Tourism Tasmania was established as a statutory authority.

In August 2002 the Department of Environment, Parks, Heritage and the Arts incorporated Tourism Tasmania.

Tourism Tasmania became a stand-alone State Authority from 1 July 2014.

At various stages it has been also incorporated into other departments:

- Department of Natural Resources and Environment (Tasmania)
- Department of Economic Development, Tourism and the Arts
- Building Tasmania
