= Simon Currant =

Australian tourism developer

- Occupation: Tourism developer

Simon Currant, AM is a tourism developer in Tasmania, Australia. He has served as a director of Tourism Industry Council Tasmania and as a director of Spirit of Tasmania.

His past tourism developments include the Strahan Village, Cradle Mountain Lodge, Peppermint Bay and Pumphouse Point.

He was awarded a Centenary Medal in 2001, Tasmanian of the Year in 2004 and appointed an honorary Member of the Order of Australia in 2006.
