= Ambulance Tasmania =

Ambulance service in Tasmania, Australia

Agency overview
- Superseding agency: Tasmanian Ambulance Service
- Jurisdiction: Tasmanian Government
- Headquarters: Hobart, Tasmania
- Employees: 687
- Annual budget: A$203.1 million (2024–2025)
- Minister responsible: The Hon. Bridget Archer MP, Minister for Health, Mental Health and Wellbeing
- Agency executive: Nicole Ashworth, Chief Executive
- Parent agency: Department of Health
- Website: Ambulance Tasmania

Ambulance Tasmania is the statutory ambulance service responsible for providing emergency pre-hospital care and patient transport across the state of Tasmania, Australia. Operating as part of the Department of Health, the service delivers paramedic-led emergency medical response services, non-emergency patient transport, and aeromedical retrievals.

== History ==
Ambulance services in Tasmania were initially provided by hospitals, local government and volunteer organisations, with the first organised service provided by the Launceston General Hospital in 1887. Ambulance services were gradually centralised under government control as the Tasmanian Ambulance Service from 1970, formalised by the Ambulance Service Act 1982. The service was renamed Ambulance Tasmania in 2014.

== Operations ==
Ambulance Tasmania operates a state-wide network of 57 stations across three regions, two aeromedical units and a communications centre.

The service's Headquarters and Communications Centre are based in Hobart, with regional headquarters located in Hobart, Launceston and Burnie. Branch stations provide service to rural and remote communities with various models of resourcing.

- There are 16 metropolitan or urban stations, staffed by double or single paramedic crews
- There are 8 double branch stations, staffed by single paramedics 24 hours a day, supported by volunteers
- There are 16 single branch stations, staffed by single paramedics during the day and available on-call after-hours, supported by volunteers
- There are 11 stations where volunteers provide a first response using an ambulance, backed up as required by paramedics
- There are 4 Community Emergency Response Teams where volunteers provide a first response using a service vehicle, backed up as required and for patient transport by paramedics

Emergency medical services are provided by 461 qualified and registered paramedics and intensive care paramedics. 388 volunteer ambulance officers support service in some non-urban locations, either assisting paramedics or by providing first response to emergencies, delivering basic life support until paramedics arrive.

The service uses secondary triage nurses, along with extended care and community paramedics to provide patient assessment and medical services. These services provide access to alternative services or be treated at home where an emergency ambulance response is not required.

Patient Transport Officers provide non-emergency patient transport and inter-facility transfers for patients who are clinically stable, but who require basic clinical care and observation.

Fixed-wing aero-medical retrievals and transfers are provided by the Royal Flying Doctor Service based in Launceston, using Ambulance Tasmania paramedics and doctors to transfer critically ill patients.

Rotary-wing aero-medical retrievals and search and rescue services are provided by the Westpac Rescue Helicopter Service based in Hobart. It is a joint agency service delivered by Ambulance Tasmania doctors and paramedics, and aircrew and rescue specialised from Tasmania Police. Helicopters are provided under contract to the Tasmanian Government by StarFlight Australia. Services are operated using 3 Bell 412 helicopters.

== Fleet and equipment ==
Ambulance Tasmania operates a fleet of 208 vehicles, including emergency ambulances, patient transport vehicles and operations support vehicles.

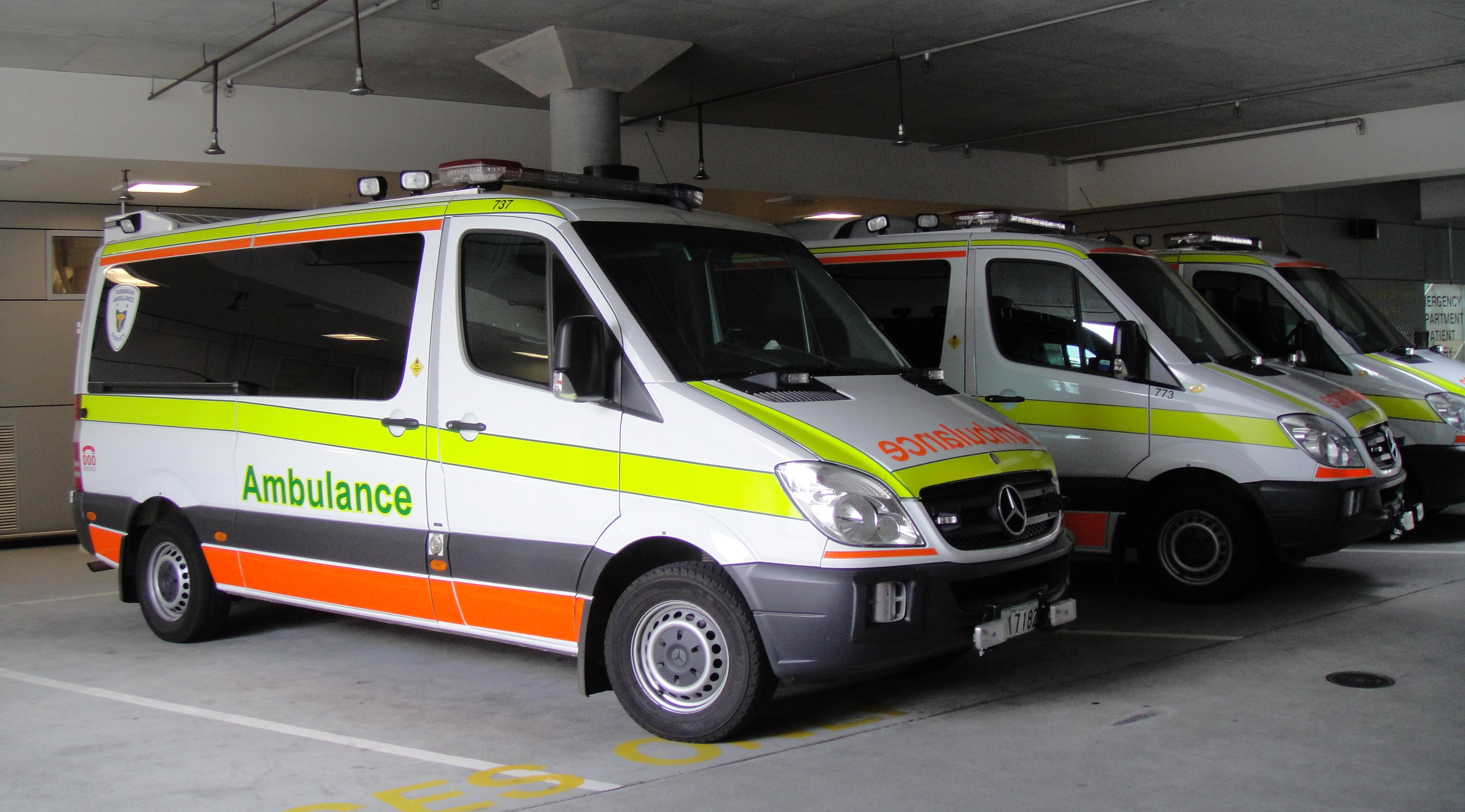
Mercedes-Benz Sprinter ambulances with previous livery

Emergency ambulances are predominately Mercedes-Benz Sprinters, with modifications by Tasmanian company Mader International, based in Penguin.

Specialised vehicles include Toyota LandCruiser 4WD vehicles, along with modified Mercedes-Benz Sprinters used as multi-role special operations vehicles for command, neonatal transfers and bariatric patients.

== Funding ==
Ambulance Tasmania was funded to the value of $203.1 million in the 2024-25 Australian financial year.

Over 90% of funding for the service is provided by government grants, with transport fees, subscriptions and other income making up the balance.

Cost of ambulance services is waived in most cases for patients who are residents of Tasmania. Where services are required as a result of motor vehicle accident, workplace accident, public liability incident or crime, another party may be liable for payment. Non-residents are liable for cost of ambulance services, which may be covered by insurance or reciprocal agreements.

== See also ==
- Tasmania Police
- Tasmania Fire Service
- State Emergency Service
