= TasWater =

Australian water and sewage public utility

- Type: Government enterprise
- Industry: Public utilities
- Predecessors: Ben Lomond Water, Cradle Mountain Water, Southern Water, Onstream
- Founded: July 2013, Tasmania, Australia
- Area served: Tasmania
- Key people: George Theo, Chief Executive Officer
- Services: Water and sewage supply
- Total assets: A$2,187.5 million
- Owner: Local Government Areas of Tasmania
- Website: https://www.taswater.com.au

TasWater is Tasmania's water and sewage utility. It is responsible for providing drinking water across the state and collecting and treating sewage. It is jointly owned by Tasmania's local governments and the Tasmanian Government. TasWater manages over 221,000 water connections and maintains more than 11,400 km of water and sewer mains.

TasWater commenced operations on 1 July 2013, following the merger of the three former regional Tasmanian water and sewerage corporations (Ben Lomond Water, Cradle Mountain Water and Southern Water) and the common services provider company, Onstream.

== Background ==
Prior to 2008, Tasmania's and sewerage infrastructure was owned by either one of the state's 29 local government councils or one of the three bulk water authorities: Hobart Water, Esk Water and Cradle Coast Water. In 2006 a State Government appointed Ministerial Water and Sewerage Taskforce, stating that Tasmania faced significant challenges to enable its water and sewerage infrastructure to keep pace with demand and that in many areas, existing water and sewerage infrastructure was reaching capacity. The taskforce also noted that 33 towns had been identified with water supply problems and 58 wastewater treatment systems were operating below standards.

In 2008, the State Government passed the Water and Sewerage Corporations Act 2008 as a result of a report from the taskforce. The Act transferred council-owned water and sewage assets to three new entities: Southern Water, Ben Lomond Water and Cradle Mountain Water. A fourth entity, Onstream, provided shared services to the corporations, including payroll, billing and procurement. The state's government and the 29 Local Government councils of Tasmania became joint owners of the corporations, with Onstream being jointly owned by the three corporations. These changes took place in July 2009.

In September 2011, the common chair of the boards of the three corporations and Onstream started discussing creating a single statewide water and sewerage corporation. In 2012, a House of Assembly Select Committee report on the issue supported the creation of a single entity. The report's summary found "after considering the evidence presented to it, the Committee accepts that a single entity will deliver material benefits to the Tasmanian community. These benefits will manifest as either, downward pressure on future price increases, better health outcomes as a result of increased investment in infrastructure, improved financial security for owner councils, or a combination of all three."

== History ==
On 1 July 2013, through the amalgamation of three regional corporations - Ben Lomond Water, Southern Water, and Cradle Mountain Water - and their shared services provider, Onstream. The new statewide entity was established to deliver consistent, safe, and reliable water and sewerage services across Tasmania.

In 2018, TasWater entered into a partnership with the Tasmanian Government, which acquired a 10 per cent equity stake in the corporation. This agreement included a commitment by the state to contribute funding towards critical infrastructure upgrades over a 10-year period, in return for shared governance responsibilities alongside Tasmania's councils.

To enhance project delivery capacity and efficiency, the TasWater Capital Delivery Office (CDO) was established on 1 July 2019. Formed through an alliance with infrastructure delivery partners, the CDO is responsible for managing and implementing major capital works projects across the state.

== Key Projects ==
Key infrastructure projects delivered by TasWater include:

- The upgrade of the Bryn Estyn Water Treatment Plant, the largest capital works project undertaken by TasWater, completed on time and under budget.
- The Tamar Estuary River Health Action Plan (TERHAP), focused on improving wastewater quality and environmental outcomes in northern Tasmania.
- The Ulverstone Sewage Treatment Plant upgrade, which supports regional growth and enhances protection of local waterways.

TasWater continues to invest significantly in its asset base, with over $1.9 billion allocated to capital improvements between 2023 and 2028. These projects aim to improve water quality, reduce non-revenue water, modernise ageing infrastructure, and support population and economic growth.

The corporation also supports community education and engagement through initiatives such as the Water Guardians program and the Be a Refiller campaign, which promote water literacy and sustainability.

== Media Coverage ==
The company was criticised for a sewage spill into the South Esk River in April 2014, which it failed to inform the Northern Midlands Council of until three days after residents reported it and would not inform the Mayor of when the spill had started.

The company was the subject of a petition by residents of Circular Head Council, requesting control of local water services be returned to the council. The petition was handed to TasWater by local alderman upon receiving 350 signatures. Residents of Gretna presented a petition to Will Hodgman, the then Premier of Tasmania in January 2015, demanding fixing of their water which had been dangerous for up to six years but degenerated even further recently. Gretna was at the time one of 21 towns in Tasmania with permanent danger warnings on their water supply.

In February 2015, the state peak body for property investors, the Property Council of Australia – Tasmania branch, launched a call for the fixing of major water quality issues by paying less dividends to councils and returning profit to the companies maintenance.

== See also ==
- List of Tasmanian government agencies
