= Office of the Tasmanian Economic Regulator =

Government agency in Tasmania, Australia

Agency overview
- Formed: 1 October 2008
- Superseding agencies: Office of the Tasmanian Energy Regulator; Government Prices Oversight Commission; Tasmanian Energy Regulator
- Jurisdiction: Tasmania, Australia
- Minister responsible: Treasurer
- Parent department: Department of Treasury and Finance
- Website: www.energyregulator.tas.gov.au

The Office of the Tasmanian Economic Regulator, or OTTER is the Tasmanian Government agency responsible for various economic and energy supply regulating actions in the Australian state of Tasmania. OTTER is a member of the national Utility Regulators Forum, and it has its headquarters in Hobart, Tasmania.

== Duties ==
Under the Economic Regulator 2009 Act, the Tasmanian Economic Regulator replaced the former Government Prices Oversight Commission as the organization responsible for conducting investigations into the pricing of government agencies and local government bodies that are monopoly suppliers of goods and or services inside Tasmania. OTTER is also responsible for administering the Tasmanian Electricity Code and the Electricity Supply Industry Act 1995, and licensing energy suppliers in Tasmania. In 2000, through the Gas Act 2000 OTTER was given the responsibility to license gas suppliers and "facilitating the development of a gas supply industry in Tasmania".

== Board ==
The board of the Tasmanian Economic Regulator is:

Name	Position	Term start	Term end
Glenn Appleyard	Chairman		
Peter Hoult	Member		
Alan Smart	Member		
Joe Dimasi	Regulator	9 November 2015	

== Previous bodies ==
In 2009, through the Economic Regulator Act 2009, The Tasmanian Economic Regulator replaced the Electricity Regulator, the Director of Gas, Government Prices Oversight Commission and the Water and Sewerage Economic Regulator, who had previously divided OTTER's duties between them.

== See also ==
- List of Tasmanian government agencies
