= Tasmanian Coast Conservation Fund =

The Tasmanian Coast Conservation Fund is a non-profit charitable fund dedicated to providing funding for the preservation of national parks in Tasmania. The fund was established in 2007 by Pennicott Wilderness Journeys in partnership with WILDCARE Inc to support coastal reserve land management, marine mammal and seabird conservation.

The fund was founded on the idea that "the natural environment is held in trust by all people on Earth, it's our duty to pass it on unspoilt to future generations".

The fund supports projects that contribute to coastal land management, marine mammal and seabird conservation, community awareness and community participation in coastal conservation. Projects are selected by the WILDCARE Gift Fund committee and undertaken by Tasmania Parks and Wildlife Service. These projects are identified by submissions from community groups supported by the Wildlife Service, or from the Wildlife Service directly.

== See also ==
- Pennicott Wilderness Journeys
- Tasmania Parks and Wildlife Service
