= Mersey Community Hospital =

- Tasmanian Health Service
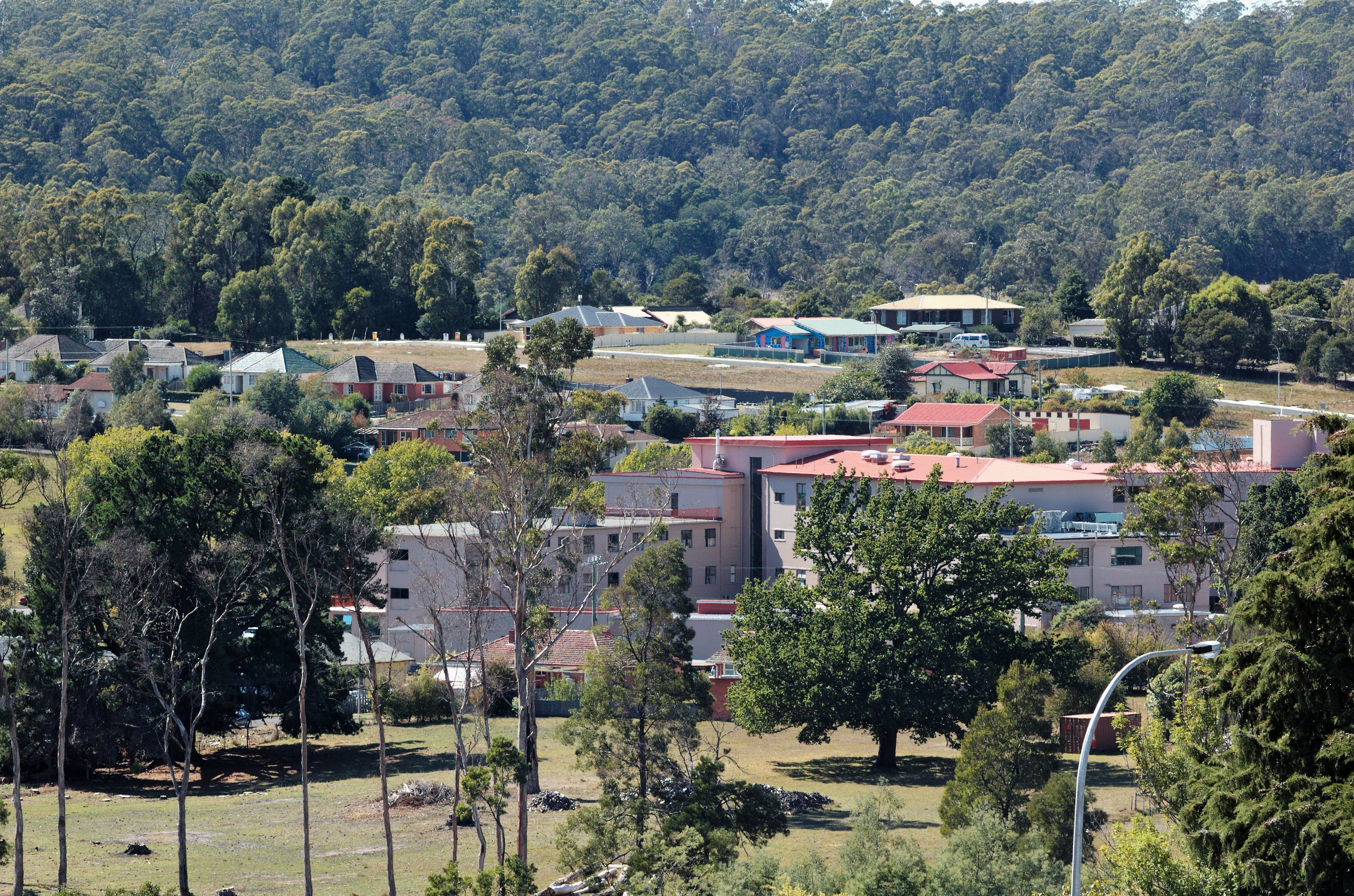

Geography
- Location: Latrobe, Tasmania, Australia
- Coordinates: 41.230°S 146.423°E

Organisation
- Care system: Public Medicare (AU)
- Type: Community

Links
- Lists: Hospitals in Australia

The Mersey Community Hospital is a public hospital at Latrobe near Devonport in Tasmania. Like the North West Regional Hospital, it is operated by the Tasmanian Health Service - North West Region, which is part of the Tasmanian government's Department of Health.

== History ==
Under the Tasmanian Government's 2007 plan to reform its health system, the Mersey campus was to be downgraded with certain care services transferred to Burnie.

On 1 August 2007, the Australian prime minister announced Australian Government would guarantee the continued funding of a wide range of in-patient and out-patient services at the Mersey campus, and support its re-establishment as a Mersey Community Hospital, managed by a community-controlled and federally funded trust. The Australian Government's announced intention is that the hospital continue to provide a full range of services.

Reaction to the announcement was mixed. There was support from the local community and some staff at the hospital. However senior medical clinicians and medical policy specialists expressed concern. Political commentators were generally cynical, noting that the 'takeover' was to occur in the Division of Braddon, the most marginal government-held federal electorate in Tasmania.

On 20 August 2007, the Tasmanian Government agreed to sell the hospital for a nominal $1.00, subject to a number of conditions. The Commonwealth assumed ownership of the Mersey Community Hospital from the Tasmanian Government on 23 November 2007. From 1 September 2008, the Hospital is owned by the Commonwealth and operated by the Tasmanian Government.
