= Tasmania Police Special Operations Group =

Police tactical unit of Tasmania Police

Special Operations Group
- Active: 1979–present
- Country: Australia
- Agency: Tasmania Police
- Type: Police tactical group
- Role: Law enforcement; Counter-terrorism
- Part of: Special Response and Counter-Terrorism Unit
- Headquarters: Hobart
- Motto: "Si Opus Sit"; Where There Is Need
- Common name: Soggies; Sons of God
- Abbreviation: SOG

Structure
- Operators: 20
- Subunits: North; South

Notables
- Significant operation(s): Port Arthur massacre

The Special Operations Group (SOG) is the police tactical group of the Tasmania Police. In August 2024, the SOG transitioned from a part-time unit to a full-time unit. However, the SOG role changed when it became a full-time unit from being primarily responsible for high risk operations to providing frontline assistance to uniform police officers.

== Mission ==
The SOG incorporates police officers who, through specific training, have acquired skills and expertise to provide a specialist resource and response to support statewide operational policing when beyond the scope of general police resources, practices or situation management. The SOG is deployed in high risk situations and in other approved circumstances approved by an Assistant Commissioner.

Since the SOG became a full-time unit, frontline officers have been able to request SOG frontline assistance by contacting the SOG inspector or sergeant.

== History ==
The SOG has its origins in the Armed Offenders Squad formed in 1978, that was subsequently renamed the Special Weapons Squad by 1985 and was renamed to the Special Operations Group between 1988 and 1991.

In July 1991, a SOG sniper fatally shot Vietnam war veteran Joseph Gilewicz near Pelverata.

=== Port Arthur ===
On 28 April 1996, the SOG responded to the Port Arthur massacre; gunman Martin Bryant, who was intellectually disabled and mentally ill, was reported to have killed over 30 people. The active shooter was in possession of a 5.56mm AR-15 semi-automatic rifle and a 7.62mm FN FAL semi-automatic rifle with large quantities of ammunition.

On the morning of Sunday the 28th, Bryant travelled to Seascape, a tourist accommodation facility, and killed the couple who owned the bed and breakfast. Shortly afterwards, he drove a short distance to Port Arthur, a popular tourist attraction, and started shooting people at around 1330 hours. Uniform police, some distance away, were dispatched at 1335. Bryant had killed 27 people changing between rifles. He left Port Arthur at about 1345 hours, carjacking a BMW at the entrance, and later stopped a Toyota exiting a service station, taking a male hostage, before returning to Seascape at about 1400 hours. He had killed a further 5 people. The hostage was secured in the house before Bryant set the BMW on fire. Two uniform police arrived, witnessing the BMW alight, and were fired upon taking cover in a culvert.

At about 1530 hours, negotiators made contact with Bryant, and at 1537 hours, an SOG contingent departed Hobart, 85 km away, by helicopter together with a contingent by car at 1604 hours. At about 2100 hours, two SOG officers joined the uniform officers in the culvert, and at about 2300 hours, all crawled out about 200 m to safety. Continuous fire came from various directions from Seascape using differing weapons, including weapons the owners possessed, including a 7.62mm SKS assault rifle. A sniper approached to within 75 m of Seascape, a lapse by the operator to conceal his radio's light exposed his position to Bryant who could see a red light every time he transmitted. Bryant fired at the sniper and he advised the negotiator that he saw police. The SOG thought he may possess night vision, not aware of the lapse to cover the radio light.

The SOG believed that in addition to the confirmed hostage that the owner couple were still alive and were hostages. The SOG formed a perimeter under constant fire. No fire was returned by the SOG due to risk to hostages. Eight officers from the Victoria Police Special Operations Group arrived by two chartered planes at 2300 hours to provide assistance.

An immediate action plan was prepared to rescue the three hostages, with an estimated in excess of 30% casualty rate for the operators; no movement by a hostage had been witnessed. A decision was made to wait it out, and between 0400 and 0600 hours, there was a lull in the shooting. At about 0745 hours, Seascape was set on fire, and at about 0825 hours, Bryant ran out on fire and unarmed and was immediately arrested. Nearly 200 rounds had been fired from Seascape. After the fire, the body of the hostage from the Toyota was located in the building with fatal gunshot injuries who had been killed before the fire as there was no evidence of smoke inhalation.

=== Deployments ===
In the 2013–14 year, the SOG conducted eight high risk deployments which had by 2017–18 increased by 150% to 20 high-risk deployments. On 8 December 2018, the SOG tactically resolved a 16 hour siege at a residence in Trevallyn in which at least 33 shots were fired from the residence arresting a man and a woman. In June 2025, a SOG operator shot a man in the hand at North Motton following the fatal shooting of Constable Keith Smith. In June 2025, it was reported that in the past year, the SOG had conducted 63 high risk deployments, and that in the past 18 months, the SOG had attended around 800 frontline response assistance jobs.

== Organisation ==
Prior to 2024 when the SOG became a full-time unit, the SOG had three part-time teams. Two teams were southern based – Alpha team and Bravo team each with eight members, whilst the third, Echo team, with ten members was based in Launceston. Vehicles and equipment were located with each team to provide a more timely response. Each team participated in the on-call roster with this capability maintained every day of the year.

The SOG had always struggled to maintain staffing at the national recommended minimum due to the small size of Tasmania Police providing a limited pool for SOG recruiting. There had been calls to make the SOG full-time. In 2003, ten SOG officers positions were converted to full-time to establish a full-time team to augment the twenty part-time SOG officers. In 2007, the full-time team's role changed to administrative tasked with coordinating training and equipment and was downsized to four officers to be ultimately ended in 2012. In 2018, the government announced funding would be provided to re-establish a full-time core SOG, and in 2019, announced that four SOG officers positions would be converted to full-time in 2020. In November 2020, the government announced funding for a further twenty full time SOG officers, whose initial duties will also include COVID-19 response. The SOG was planned to have twenty dedicated officers by 2024 based in Hobart and Launceston. In August 2024, the government announced that the SOG had transitioned into a full-time unit.

When the SOG was a part-time unit it was assisted by the SOG Support Unit, formerly the Cordon and Containment Team, that was formed in 2009 to provide additional support for the SOG with holding a close cordon at a high-risk incident in an urban environment and assisting marksmen in rural environments. Team members completed a two-week training course and an eight-day refresher course annually.

== Role ==
The SOG roles are:

- Resolving siege and hostage situations, as well as armed offender situations
- Counter-terrorism and hijacking operations
- The escort and security of VIPs, internationally protected persons, Heads of State
- Undertaking searches of premises in high risk situations
- The arrest of armed and dangerous offenders
- Escorting and securing dangerous prisoners in high risk situations

== Training ==
Volunteers for the SOG need to successfully complete a one-week selection course, and if successful, must then successfully complete an 8-week training course.

Training includes weapons skills, close quarter tactics, room clearances, method of entry (buildings / doors), less lethal options (including CS gas, Taser and Bean bag rounds), rural and urban tactics, water operations (including the fast response vessel), fast roping / helicopter training, surveillance and many other related disciplines.

45 training days are allocated a year to maintain these skills and there is participation in the ANZCTC Police Tactical Group Skills Enhancement Courses with the 2nd Commando Regiment and Special Air Service Regiment.

The ABC documentary television series Australian Story screened an episode A Few Good Men in March 2000 on the selection and training course.

== Equipment ==
The SOG is equipped with less-than-lethal equipment that is not issued to general duties officers including the Taser. In June 2012, the SOG took delivery of a Lenco BearCat replacing their Mercedes-Benz Sprinter based Armoured Tactical Vehicle (ATV) acquired in 2006. In April 2026, the SOG took delivery of a former Western Australia Police Force 2012 model Lenco BearCat. The second BearCat will be used by the SOG to cover both northern and southern regions of the state.

In May 2019, the government allocated A$400,000 in the 2019–20 State Budget for new equipment with A$100,000 allocated each year over four years. In March 2022, a A$1 million Specialist Capabilities Building facility was opened in northern Tasmania. In December 2022, a A$3.6 million Specialist Capabilities Building facility was opened in southern Tasmania.

== See also ==
- Police Tactical Group
- Victoria Police Special Operations Group
- Australian Defence Force Tactical Assault Group
