= Clifford Craig Medical Research Trust =

Tasmanian non-profit organisation

The Clifford Craig Medical Research Trust was established in 1992 by the community of Northern Tasmania to be an independent, non-profit organisation interested in discovering and sharing better treatments of disease.

The organisation is named in honour of the late Dr. Clifford Craig who served as surgeon and superintendent of the Launceston General Hospital as well as a radiologist and historian.

== Mission ==
The founding vision in 1992 was to create a world-class medical research institute in Northern Tasmania with a strong focus on the diseases that affect the local community. The Clifford Craig Medical Research Trust was responsible for building the research centre on level 5 of the Launceston General Hospital, where its office are located. The organisation funded 82 medical research projects to date.

== Leadership ==
The first executive officer appointed to the trust was Toni Maloney, followed by Phil Baker. In 2007 the trust appointed Michael Ferguson as chief executive officer. In November 2009, former Southern Cross Television marketing manager Peter Milne was appointed chief executive officer to replace Michael Ferguson who resigned to stand as a candidate for the seat of Bass in the Tasmanian state election.
