= Screen Tasmania =

Tasmanian Government owned flim and show producer

- Predecessor: Tasmanian Film Corporation
- Formation: 1999; 27 years ago
- Founded at: Tasmania
- Type: Governmental organisation
- Purpose: Promotion and development of Tasmanian screen industry
- Location: Hobart, Australia
- Executive Manager: Alex Sangston
- Parent organisation: Building Tasmania
- Website: www.screen.tas.gov.au

Screen Tasmania is the Government of Tasmania’s film, television, and digital media funding and support body. It aims to promote the growth of the screen industry in Tasmania, assist local talent, and attract production projects to the state.

== History ==
Screen Tasmania was founded in 1999 under the Department of State Growth to support the development of Tasmania’s screen industry. Its establishment marked the revival of dedicated screen industry support in Tasmania, following the closure of the Tasmanian Film Corporation in the early 1980s.

The late 1990s and early 2000s saw a broader cultural push in Tasmania under Premier Jim Bacon’s government, which included the establishment of Screen Tasmania and the launch of Ten Days on the Island, Tasmania’s first international arts festival. This period of renewed cultural investment provided a foundation for the state’s growing screen industry.

Initially operating with a modest budget of approximately $1 million, Screen Tasmania focused on supporting local storytelling and encouraging collaboration with national and international production companies. Early funding initiatives prioritised documentaries, which explored Tasmania’s unique cultural and natural heritage.

Infrastructure and training programs also played a significant role in building the local industry. The Mobile Media Access Facility offered accessible resources and training, while partnerships with organisations such as the Australian Film, Television and Radio School provided professional development opportunities for Tasmanian practitioners.

Screen Tasmania’s strategic plan, released in the mid-2000s, emphasised fostering collaboration between local filmmakers and external industry stakeholders, while creating opportunities for emerging talent. The plan reflected the organisation’s goal of nurturing a sustainable and professional screen industry in the state.

By the mid-2000s, Screen Tasmania had supported a variety of productions, from feature films and television series to documentaries that highlighted Tasmania’s distinct narratives and landscapes. Collaboration with the Tasmanian Screen Network further strengthened the industry’s professional infrastructure and representation.

Today, Screen Tasmania continues to facilitate the development of the state’s screen industry through funding, training, and resource support for both local and visiting productions.

== Major productions ==
Screen Tasmania has supported a range of film, television, and digital media productions in Tasmania.

=== Feature films ===
- The Nightingale (2018) – A historical drama that consulted Indigenous Tasmanians.
- Lion (2016) – Filmed partly in Tasmania and featured Tasmanian landscapes.
- The Hunter (2011) – Adaptation of a novel, featuring Tasmanian settings and wildlife.
- Van Diemen's Land (2009) – Explores Tasmania’s convict history.

=== Television series ===
- Bay of Fires (2023) – A dark comedy-drama filmed in Tasmania.
- Deadloch (2023) – Crime series filmed on Tasmania’s east coast.
- Rosehaven (2016–2021) – Comedy series filmed in southern Tasmania.
- The Kettering Incident (2016) – A mystery series set in Tasmania.

=== Documentaries ===
- David Attenborough's Tasmania (2018) – A documentary showcasing the island’s biodiversity.
- The Survivors (2024) – A Netflix drama series filmed in Tasmania and Victoria.

=== Emerging Talent ===
Screen Tasmania supports emerging filmmakers through funding initiatives and local film festivals such as the BOFA (Breath of Fresh Air Film Festival).

== See also ==
- Film and television financing in Australia
- List of film production companies
- List of television production companies
- Cinema of Australia
- Screen Australia
- List of films shot in Tasmania
