= Pennicott Wilderness Journeys =

Travel and holiday companies of Australia

- Industry: Tourism
- Founded: 1999
- Founder: Robert Pennicott
- Headquarters: Hobart, Australia
- Key people: Robert Pennicott
- Products: Bruny Island Cruises, Tasman Island Cruises
- Number of employees: 50
- Website: http://www.pennicottjourneys.com.au

Pennicott Wilderness Journeys is a tourism company based in Hobart, Tasmania. It operates two separate tours, one on Bruny Island and one at Port Arthur. The company was founded as Bruny Island Charters in 1999 by Robert Pennicott and is one of the largest tourism operators in Tasmania, carrying 50,000 passengers over the 2009/10 season.

In 2008 the company was named the Australian First Generation Family Business of the Year, Tasmanian Business of the Year, Australian Small Business of the Year. Its two cruises have won numerous awards at a state and national level.

== Bruny Island Cruises ==
Bruny Island Cruises operates tours that take visitors along the coast of the South Bruny National Park. Recognised as one of The 100 Greatest Trips of The World by Travel + Leisure Magazine's 2008 Yearbook, the cruise has also been awarded Tasmania's Best Tourist Attraction 2006, 2008 & 2009; along with recognition as Australia's Best Ecotourism Attraction in February 2010.

Bruny Island is a small island in south east Tasmania, approximately 40 km from Hobart. The cruises operate from Adventure Bay on South Bruny Island and travel south along the coastline of the island to the point where the Southern Ocean meets the Tasman Sea. As the largest business on the island, it is also the largest employer of locals and a substantial contributor to the small island's economy.

== Tasman Island Cruises ==
In December 2007, the company opened Tasman Island Cruises at Port Arthur, near the entrance to the Port Arthur Historic Site. This cruise travels along the coastline of the Tasman Peninsula from Pirates Bay at Eaglehawk Neck to Stewarts Bay at Port Arthur, coastline with tall sea cliffs in excess of 300m and interesting natural rock formations In 2008, Tasman Island Cruises was named Tasmania's Best New Tourist Development.

== Conservation ==
Pennicott Wilderness Journeys established the Tasmanian Coast Conservation Fund in 2007 through a partnership with WILDCARE Inc. The fund was established to support conservation projects in southern Tasmania. In July 2008 the company made a $40,000 donation and in the following year made a further $25,000 contribution. Both the Bruny Island and Tasman Island Cruises are also 100% Carbon Offset.

== Hobart Presence ==
In February 2010, the company opened a new $400,000 booking office on Hobart's waterfront.
