= North West Regional Hospital =

Geography
- Location: Burnie, Tasmania, Australia
- Coordinates: 41.0471°S 145.8818°E

Organisation
- Care system: Department of Health

Services
- Emergency department: Yes
- Beds: 160

Helipads
- Helipad: (ICAO: YBUI)
Number	Length		Surface
Number	ft	m	Surface
1			concrete

History
- Founded: 1994

Links
- Website: www.health.tas.gov.au
- Lists: Hospitals in Australia

North West Regional Hospital is the primary healthcare facility for the North Western region of Tasmania. Like the Mersey Community Hospital, it is operated by the Tasmanian Health Service - North West Region, which is part of the Tasmanian government's Department of Health. It is located in Burnie together with the North West Private Hospital, which is part of Ramsay Health Care. It offers a full range of general care, and nuclear medicine service.

== History ==
The hospital was built in 1994 and was originally owned privately and leased to the Government of Tasmania. The government agreed to buy it in 2010, to invest in and expand the facility.

It replaced the original Burnie Hospital, which opened on 21 August 1951 at the site of the current Harvey Norman complex in Marine Terrace. Burnie Hospital had been constructed to supplement the private Darwin Hospital which opened in Burnie in 1933, and the public Spencer and Devon hospitals in Wynyard and Latrobe respectively. The population of Burnie had reached 10,000, and was expected to grow further due to rapid industrial growth.

Under the Tasmanian government's 2007 plan to reform its health system, the Mersey Hospital was to be downgraded with certain care services transferred to Burnie.

On 1 August 2007, the Prime Minister of Australia announced that the Federal Government would guarantee the continued funding of a wide range of in-patient and out-patient services at the Mersey campus, and support its re-establishment as Mersey Community Hospital, managed by a community-controlled and Commonwealth-funded trust.

On 9 May 2023, a doctor working at the hospital was stabbed. A 17-year-old youth was charged with wounding and two counts of threatening police.

=== COVID-19 closure ===
During the COVID-19 pandemic in 2020 two passengers from the cruise ship Ruby Princess were sent to the hospital in late March. A staff member was found to have COVID-19 on 3 April. Cases had been confirmed among staff in most wards of the hospital by April 12, also the pathology and outpatient clinics on the same site, at the co-located North West Private Hospital, and the Mersey Community Hospital in Latrobe.

In mid-April the hospital was temporarily closed by the state government due to the outbreak of COVID-19 at the hospital and in the local region. All staff, about 1,200 people and their families, were required to go into 14 days of quarantine by self-isolation. Regionally between 4 and 5,000 people were required to quarantine. The North West Private Hospital was also closed at the same time. By 1 May 2020 the outbreak had resulted in 132 confirmed COVID-19 cases, including 81 healthcare workers and 25 patients.

The hospitals were to be thoroughly cleaned and then reopened by Australian Defence Force and AusMAT (Australian Medical Assistance Teams) medics.

There were at least 12 deaths from COVID-19 in the region, out of a total of 13 statewide.

The NWRH was due to be fully operational by 14 May.
