= Department of Health (Tasmania) =

Tasmanian government department

Department overview
- Formed: 24 November 1992
- Preceding Department: Department of Community Services
- Type: Government department
- Jurisdiction: Tasmanian Government
- Headquarters: 22 Elizabeth Street, Hobart, Australia
- Employees: 17,441 (2024–25)
- Annual budget: $3.779 billion (2026–27 FY)
- Minister responsible: Bridget Archer, Minister for Health, Mental Health and Wellbeing
- Department executive: Dale Webster, Secretary
- Website: www.health.tas.gov.au

The Department of Health (DoH), previously the Department of Health and Human Services (DHHS) is the Tasmanian Government department responsible for hospitals, ambulances and community health, while also supporting related areas such as primary healthcare. The department is the largest of all the Tasmanian Government agencies.

The department is led by its Secretary, Dale Webster. The Secretary is responsible to the Minister for Health, Mental Health and Wellbeing presently Bridget Archer MP.

The Tasmanian Health Service is the service delivery arm of the DoH which provides public hospital, medical, community and aged care, oral health and mental health services. This includes delivery of health care at the Launceston General Hospital, the Royal Hobart Hospital, Mersey Community Hospital, and the North West Regional Hospital.

Ambulance services are provided by Ambulance Tasmania.

== History ==
The department was formed on 24 November 1992, from the amalgamation of the Department of Community Services and the former Department of Health and was known as the Department of Community and Health Services.

On 18 September 1998, the name of the department was changed to the Department of Health and Human Services.

On 1 July 2018, parts of the department were amalgamated with the Department of Communities Tasmania and was renamed the Department of Health.

=== List of Tasmanian Ministers for Health ===
This is a list of Ministers for Health or any of its titles since first appearing as Minister Administering The Office Of The Minister For Health in 1943.

Minister	Party	Premier	Title	Term
Eric Howroyd	Labor	Cosgrove	Minister Administering The Office Of The Minister For Health	30 November 1943 – 29 March 1946
Alfred White	Labor	Cosgrove	Honorary Minister For Health	29 March 1946 – 9 December 1946
Alfred White	Labor	Brooker	Minister Administering The Office Of The Minister For Health	19 December 1947 – 24 February 1948
Alfred White	Labor	Cosgrove	Minister for Health	25 February 1948 – 2 September 1948
Reginald Turnbull	Labor	Cosgrove	Minister for Health	2 September 1948 – 23 October 1956
Reginald Turnbull	Labor	Cosgrove	Minister Administering The Department of Health Services	23 October 1956 – 11 June 1958
Alfred White	Labor	Cosgrove	Minister Administering The Department of Health Services	12 June 1958 – 26 August 1958
Alfred White	Labor	Reece	Minister Administering The Department of Health Services	26 August 1958 – 28 October 1958
Reginald Turnbull	Labor	Reece	Minister Administering The Department of Health Services	28 October 1958 – 7 April 1959
John Gaha	Labor	Reece	Minister for Health	9 April 1959 – 19 September 1961
William McNeil	Labor	Reece	Minister for Health	19 September 1961 – 13 May 1964
Mervyn Everett	Labor	Reece	Minister for Health	13 May 1964 – 26 May 1969
Nigel Abbott	Liberal	Bethune	Minister for Health & Road Safety	26 May 1969 – 21 March 1972
Eardley Bingham	Liberal	Bethune	Minister for Health & Road Safety	22 March 1972 – 3 May 1972
Allan Foster	Labor	Reece	Minister for Health	3 May 1972 – 15 July 1974
Hedley Farquhar	Labor	Reece	Minister for Health	16 July 1974 – 31 March 1975
Hedley Farquhar	Labor	Neilson	Minister for Health	31 March 1975 – 12 August 1976
Doug Lowe	Labor	Neilson	Minister for Industrial Relations & Health	12 August 1976 – 1 December 1977
Micheal Barnard	Labor	Lowe	Minister for Health	1 December 1977 – 29 August 1980
Gillian James	Labor	Lowe	Minister for Public Health	29 August 1980 – 7 July 1981
Gillian James	Labor	Lowe	Minister for Public & Mental Health	7 July 1981 – 11 November 1981
Gillian James	Labor	Holgate	Minister for Public & Mental Health	11 November 1981 – 26 May 1982
Thomas Cleary	Liberal	Grey	Minister for Health	27 May 1982 – 19 February 1986
Roger Groom	Liberal	Grey	Minister for Health	19 February 1986 – 29 June 1989
John White	Labor	Field	Minister for Health	3 July 1989 – 17 February 1992
Roger Groom	Liberal	Groom	Minister for Health	18 February 1992 – 23 November 1992
Roger Groom	Liberal	Groom	Minister for Community and Health Services	23 November 1992 – 18 March 1996
Peter McKay	Liberal	Rundle	Minister for Health and Community Services	18 March 1996 – 14 September 1998
Judy Jackson	Labor	Bacon	Minister for Health and Human Services	14 September 1998 – 9 August 2002
David Llewellyn	Labor	Bacon	Minister for Health and Human Services	9 August 2002 – 21 March 2004.
David Llewellyn	Labor	Lennon	Minister for Health and Human Services	21 March 2004 – 5 April 2006
Lara Giddings	Labor	Lennon	Minister for Health and Human Services	5 April 2006 – 26 May 2008
Lara Giddings	Labor	Bartlett	Minister for Health	26 May 2008 – 21 April 2010
Michelle O'Byrne	Labor	Giddings	Minister for Health	21 April 2010 – 31 March 2014
Michael Ferguson	Liberal	Hodgman	Minister for Health	31 March 2014 – 19 July 2019
Sarah Courtney	Liberal	Hodgman	Minister for Health	19 July 2019 – 20 January 2020
Sarah Courtney	Liberal	Gutwein	Minister for Health	20 January 2020 – 19 May 2021
Jeremy Rockliff	Liberal	Gutwein	Minister for Health	19 May 2021 – 8 April 2022
Jeremy Rockliff	Liberal	Rockliff	Minister for Health	8 April 2022 – 25 July 2023
Guy Barnett	Liberal	Rockliff	Minister for Health	25 July 2023 – 11 April 2024
Guy Barnett	Liberal	Rockliff	Minister for Health, Mental Health and Wellbeing	11 April 2024 – 23 October 2024
Jacquie Petrusma	Liberal	Rockliff	Minister for Health	23 October 2024 – 11 August 2025
Bridget Archer	Liberal	Rockliff	Minister for Health, Mental Health and Wellbeing	11 August 2025–

=== List of Tasmanian Ministers for Health Services ===
This is a list of Ministers for Health Services when separated from Health since first appearing in 1980.

Minister	Party	Premier	Title	Term
Micheal Barnard	Labor	Lowe	Minister for Health Services	29 August 1980 – 17 September 1980

=== List of Tasmanian Ministers for Mental Health and Wellbeing ===
This is a list of Ministers for Mental Health and Wellbeing when separated from Health since first appearing in 2019.

Minister	Party	Premier	Title	Term
Jeremy Rockliff	Liberal	Hodgman	Minister for Mental Health and Wellbeing	2 July 2019 – 20 January 2020
Jeremy Rockliff	Liberal	Gutwein	Minister for Mental Health and Wellbeing	20 January 2020 – 8 April 2022
Jeremy Rockliff	Liberal	Rockliff	Minister for Mental Health and Wellbeing	8 April 2022 – 11 April 2024
Roger Jaensch	Liberal	Rockliff	Minister for Mental Health and Wellbeing	23 October 2024 – 11 August 2025

== See also ==
- List of hospitals in Tasmania
- List of Tasmanian government agencies
