= Launceston General Hospital =

Hospital in Tasmania, Australia

- Tasmanian Health Service

Geography
- Location: Launceston, Tasmania, Australia
- Coordinates: 41.4464°S 147.1418°E

Organisation
- Care system: Public Medicare (AU)
- Type: General
- Affiliated university: University of Tasmania Faculty of Health Sciences

Services
- Emergency department: Yes
- Beds: 308 (+ 41 day care)

Helipads
- Helipad: ICAO: YXLU
Number	Length		Surface
Number	ft	m	Surface
1			concrete

History
- Founded: 1863; 163 years ago

Links
- Website: Official Website
- Lists: Hospitals in Australia

The Launceston General Hospital (LGH) is one of the three main public hospitals in Tasmania, Australia. It is located in Launceston and serves the north of the state. Services provided include Cardiology, Renal, Gastroenterology, Haematology-Oncology, Rehabilitation, General Surgery, Ear/Nose/Throat surgery, Plastic surgery, Orthopaedics, Radiology, Paediatrics and an Intensive Care Unit, Psychiatry:Inpatient Mental Health Unit and Consultation-Liaison.

It is a teaching hospital servicing the University of Tasmania.

== History ==
The Diamond Jubilee of Queen Victoria was celebrated throughout the empire in 1897. In Tasmania a public meeting was held to determine how the occasion might be marked. The second wife of the governor of Tasmania, Georgina Jane Connellan, Lady Gormanston suggested that a maternity hospital would be a great addition. At the time the only assistance to pregnant women came from untrained and unregulated midwives. It was agreed and a committee of women manage the new facility that opened on 195 St John Street in September 1897. The Queen Victoria Maternity Hospital moved in 1935 and it was not absorbed into the General Hospital until 1993 as the Queen Victoria Maternity Unit.

== Today ==
The statewide Cardiothoracic and major Paediatric surgery service is provided at the Royal Hobart Hospital.

The hospital supports medical research through the Clifford Craig Medical Research Trust.

The Intensive care unit provides medical staff who work with Ambulance Tasmania and the Royal Flying Doctor Service to provide critical care aeromedical retrieval services throughout Tasmania.

In 2018, construction began near the old wombat ward (previously the Ward 4K) to expand it. It was completed in 2019.

The hospital has been allocated $50 million in the 2022–2023 budget as part of a 10-year, $580 million redevelopment plan.

In January 2023, it was revealed that the hospital helipad in Ockerby Gardens didn't meet the Civil Aviation Safety Authority requirements for medical transport after changes published in December 2018 and initially due to come into effect in December 2021. Patients were flown to Launceston Airport instead before being transported by road in an ambulance ride which added 10 minutes. Vice-president of the Tasmanian branch of the Australian Medical Association, Annette Barratt, expressed concern at the stress that the need to transport patients from the airport would place on Ambulance Tasmania.

In February 2023, Tasmanian premier Jeremy Rockliff announced that a new emergency helipad would be built on the top of the existing car park on Cleveland Street. It opened in October 2024.
