= Arts Tasmania =

Government agency supporting the arts in Tasmania, Australia

- Formation: 1991; 35 years ago
- Type: Arts council
- Location: Hobart, Tasmania, Australia
- Region served: Tasmania
- Methods: Grants, loans, advisory services
- Director: Dr David Sudmalis
- Website: www.arts.tas.gov.au

Arts Tasmania is an agency of the Government of Tasmania and is in the portfolio of the Tasmanian Minister for the Arts. It is a part of Building Tasmania.

Arts Tasmania has a similar function to other arts funding bodies such as the Australia Council for the Arts and other global arts councils.

== Responsibilities ==
Arts Tasmania is responsible for policy, planning, strategic development, and funding of the arts and moveable cultural heritage in Tasmania. Support for the screen industry is provided by Screen Tasmania.

Key activities include:

- Aboriginal Arts: Support for Tasmanian Aboriginal artists through specific grant funding and professional development such as the Tasmanian Aboriginal Arts Mentoring Scheme.
- Grants and Loans: Grants and low-interest loans to Tasmanian artists, arts workers, and arts organisations.
- Literary Awards: The Tasmanian Literary Awards, which recognise Tasmanian authors and literary works about Tasmania.
- Public Art: Public art projects in collaboration with other Tasmanian Government departments.
- Small Museums: Support to small museums through specific grant funding and the Roving Curators, which provide expert guidance on collection management.

== Public art ==
Arts Tasmania is responsible for managing the Tasmanian Government Art Site Scheme that provides public art opportunities to Tasmanian artists.

The scheme is funded using capital work budgets for new and refurbished buildings. The Tasmanian Government's Treasurer’s Instruction PF-4 requires that two percent of the capital works estimate for all new state government building or renovation projects (excluding residential buildings and maintenance) over $250,000 be allocated for the commissioning or purchase of Tasmanian artworks.

Arts Tasmania collaborates with departments across the Tasmanian Government to develop artist briefs that align with the needs of building users and the objectives of the scheme.

Since its launch in 1979, the scheme has managed over 660 commissions, creating more than 1,900 artworks across the state.

== Peer assessment ==
Arts Tasmania and Screen Tasmania use peer assessment for grant and loan applications. This ensures that funding decisions are made transparently and fairly.

Assessors are appointed to the Cultural and Creative Industries Expert Register under the Cultural and Creative Industries Act 2017 (Tas), and have expertise as artists, arts administrators, or other sector professionals.

== History ==
In 1975, the Tasmanian Arts Advisory Board (TAAB) was established to provide advice on policy and funding to the Tasmanian Government. The TAAB was established under Tasmanian Arts Advisory Board Act (1975) (Tas).

In 1991, Arts Tasmania was created as an umbrella term used by the Tasmanian Government when referring to the TAAB, and the then Office of the Arts within the then Department of Education and the Arts. (Note: In 1990, a report commissioned for the Minister for Education and the Arts recommended that an, ‘Office of the Arts’ should be created within the Department of Education, as a way ‘to continue to assist the TAAB but also to assist the Deputy Secretary of the Department in maintaining integrated policy for arts and culture in Tasmania.’ (Final Report, Review of the Department of Education and the Arts, Tasmania, CRESAP: A Towers Perrin Co., 14 September 1990, pp131.) The TAAB endorsed the findings of this report at its 109th meeting (Minutes, TAAB’s 109th meeting, 12 December 1990, pp2) however in June 1991, a new identity ‘Arts Tasmania’ was conceived and used as an umbrella for the State arts funding and policy development, and that the ‘Office of the Arts’ and the ‘Tasmanian Arts Advisory Board’ have independent status. (Minutes, Item 4.1, Tasmanian Arts Advisory Board meeting number 113, 12 June 1991, pp2.) The name, ‘Arts Tasmania’ was publicly launched, along with a newsletter and brochure of the same name, on 18 December 1991 by the Minister for the Arts. (Minutes, TAAB’s 116th meeting, Item 5.3, 10 December 1991, pp4.) The title, ‘Office of the Arts’ only lasted until late 1992, upon which ‘Arts Tasmania’ was used thereafter. (Annual Report 1990/91, Department of Education and the Arts, Tasmania, pp33.))

In 2018, the TAAB Act was repealed and replaced by the Cultural and Creative Industries Act 2017. This introduced significant change to how arts and cultural policies were managed in Tasmania, with the assessment of grant and loan funding applications being provided by peer assessors, and strategic advice being provided to the Minister for the Arts by the Ministerial Arts and Cultural Advisory Council.
