= Tourism Industry Council Tasmania =

Tasmanian tourism agency

Tourism Industry Council Tasmania (TICT) is an organisation based in Hobart, Tasmania, Australia.

It is the peak industry body for tourism in Tasmania, and issues related to the industry.

It also seeks to influence government in issues relative to strategy for the Tourism industry in Tasmania, either in partnership or advocacy with Tourism Tasmania. As well as establishing protocol for tourism in particular environments.
