= Minister for Macquarie Point Urban Renewal =

Minister in the Tasmanian Government

- Coat of Arms of Tasmania

- Flag of Tasmania

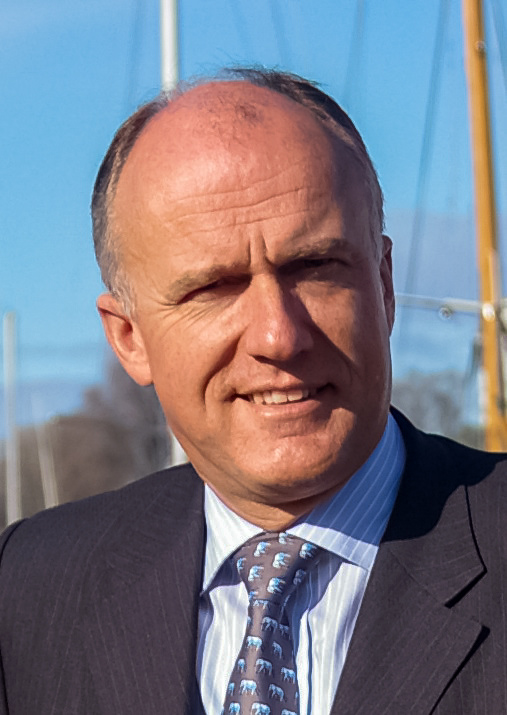
- Incumbent; Eric Abetz since 7 August 2025
- Department of Premier and Cabinet
- Style: The Honourable
- Member of: Parliament; Cabinet; Executive Council
- Reports to: Premier
- Seat: Executive Building, Hobart
- Nominator: Premier
- Appointer: Governor; on the advice of the premier
- Term length: At the Premier's discretion
- Formation: 7 August 2025
- First holder: Eric Abetz
- Unofficial names: Mac Point Minister

The Minister for Macquarie Point Urban Renewal is a minister of the cabinet of Tasmania responsible for the planned Macquarie Point Stadium. The minister is tasked with streamlining the approval process, introducing enabling legislation and being the spokesman for the government on the stadium. The position was formed on 7 August 2025 at the beginning of the Third Rockliff ministry. Its current and inaugural holder is Eric Abetz.

== History ==
The Macquarie Point Stadium is a planned stadium to be built at Macquarie Point, Hobart. It has attracted controversy within Tasmanian politics due to its cost, which is now projected to be a total of $945 million, above the original $715 million.

The stadium has been supported by the Liberal party since its inception. The Labor party under Rebecca White was not supportive of a stadium, and in the 2024 Tasmanian state election the Labor party pledged to abandon the stadium and instead build an elective surgery hospital in Hobart. Following the 2024 state election, Dean Winter was elected as Labor leader and subsequently reversed the party's position, becoming in favour of the stadium. Following the 2025 state election, Josh Willie was elected as Labor leader and continued the party's support of the stadium. The Tasmanian Greens and Jacqui Lambie Network have been against the stadium since its inception. In the parliament following the 2025 state election, all crossbenchers bar David O'Byrne are against the project.

The stadium was to go through the Project of State Significance (PoSS) process, however in 2025 the Rockliff government announced that it would instead introduce enabling fast-track legislation to bypass that process. In July 2025, it was reported that the legislation would likely not be passed by the time that the PoSS report was released.

Following the 2025 state election, Premier Rockliff appointed Eric Abetz as the inaugural minister in the Third Rockliff ministry.

== List of officeholders ==
Order	Image	Minister	Party	Electorate	Since	Cabinet
1st		Eric Abetz	Liberal	Franklin	7 August 2025	Rockliff III
