= Tasmania Police =

Law enforcement agency of the Australian state of Tasmania

- Badge of the Tasmania Police

- Flag of the Tasmania police

Agency overview
- Formed: 1 January 1899; 127 years ago
- Employees: 1,910

Jurisdictional structure
- Operations jurisdiction: Tasmania, Australia
- Tasmania Police jurisdiction
- Area: 68,401 km^{2} (26,410 sq mi)
- Population: 539,590 (March 2020)
- Legal jurisdiction: As per operations jurisdiction
- Governing body: Government of Tasmania
- Constituting instrument: Police Service Act 2003
- General nature: Civilian police

Operational structure
- Headquarters: 47 Liverpool Street; Hobart TAS 7000; 42.8800°S 147.3278°E
- Sworn members: 1,376
- Agency executive: Donna Adams, PSM, APM, Commissioner
- Support Commands: Education and Training, Operations Support, Professional Standards, Special Response and Counter-Terrorism
- Districts: Southern, Northern, Western

Facilities
- Stations: 67

Website
- www.police.tas.gov.au

Tasmania Police is the primary law enforcement agency of the Australian state of Tasmania. Established in 1899, the force has more than 1,500 officers policing Tasmania's population of 571,200 people.

== History ==
=== Colonial history ===
Prior to the formation of a unified police force, the colony of Tasmania (then called Van Diemen's Land) was policed from 1803 under the administration of Lieutenant Governor David Collins by a small number of superintendents and overseers, and from 1804 by a civilian body known as the "Night Watch", brought by Collins from Port Phillip Bay. The Night Watch was disbanded in 1806 due to ineffectiveness and was replaced by British military patrols. A municipal police force was established at Port Dalrymple (Launceston) on 19 November 1804, with Thomas Massey as Chief Constable.

=== Formation ===
With the introduction of the Police Regulation Act 1898, one unified police force was established which came into being on 1 January 1899. George Richardson was appointed the first Commissioner of the new force, and he quickly implemented several structural changes to the existing municipal policing areas, amalgamating them into 14 districts between a total of 246 police members. The early police officers were to undertake a wide variety of tasks from compiling the electoral roll in 1903, to tracking missing rifles from the Tasmanian contingent to the Second Boer War. Richardson complained frequently about the workload placed upon his officers, until a Royal Commission in 1905 recommended his replacement. William Hunt was appointed as Richardson's replacement but died before he could take office, and Colonel John Lord took his place, serving as Commissioner for 16 years with a break to serve with the First Australian Imperial Force during World War I.

=== Modernisation and present day ===
The Police Act 1905 defined and expanded the powers of Tasmania Police, which included liquor and lodging licensing, dog registration, vehicle regulation and disorderly conduct. In October 1917, the force appointed its first female police officer, Kate Campbell, and in 1918 two women were added to police staff primarily to police child protection laws. As of 30 June 2020, around 34 per cent of Tasmania Police officers were female.

By 1922, Tasmania Police had 235 police officers.

In 2004 the Police Regulation Act 1898 was finally repealed and the new Police Service Act 2003 (Tas) was proclaimed. The new Act retained a number of features of the old Act but the most controversial change was that of the powers of the Commissioner, including powers to test police officers for drugs and alcohol, integrity testing and the power to seek details of an officer's financial position. The powers of the Commissioner may, generally speaking, only be used if there is some sort of suspicion attached to an individual police officer.

== Structure ==
Tasmania Police is part of the Tasmanian Government's Department of Police, Fire and Emergency Management, which also consists of the State Emergency Service, Forensic Science Service Tasmania and the Tasmania Fire Service.

The Commissioner of Police also serves as the secretary of the Department of Police, Fire and Emergency Management, and the State Emergency Management Controller.

=== Jurisdiction ===
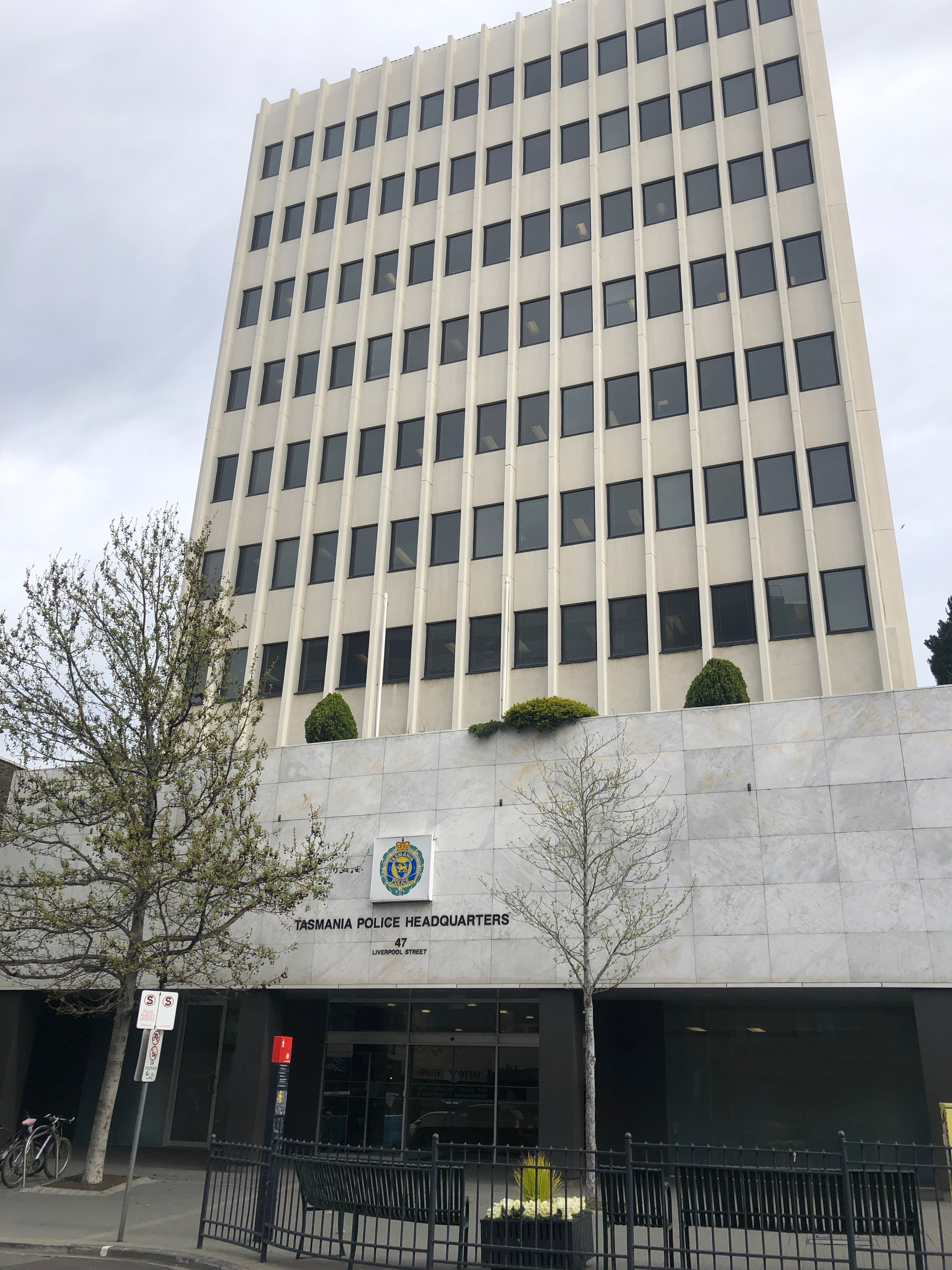
Tasmania Police Headquarters in Hobart

The force is divided into three geographical district commands: Southern, Northern and Western. Each district is divided into several geographical divisions, and is administered by a Commander. There are 67 police stations across the state, ranging from state-of-the-art urban facilities to regional and remote police houses in the state's highlands, and on King Island and Flinders Island.

=== Support commands ===
Tasmania Police comprises four support commands which support the geographical districts:

- Education and Training
- Operations Support (incorporating Firearms Services, Forensic Services, Investigative and Intelligence Support Services, Marine and Rescue Services, Radio Dispatch Services, Safe Families Coordination Unit, Serious Organised Crime Division, State Community Policing)
- Professional Standards
- Special Response and Counter-Terrorism (incorporating Policy Development, Emergency and Risk Management, Special Operations Group, Protective Security)

== Rank structure ==
Tasmania Police has a similar rank structure to other policing agencies in Australia.

Constable and non-commissioned ranks
Rank	Constable	First Class; Constable	Senior; Constable	Senior; Constable (Qualified)	Sergeant	Senior; Sergeant
Insignia						

Commissioned ranks
Rank	Inspector	Commander	Assistant; Commissioner	Deputy; Commissioner	Commissioner
Insignia					

=== Commissioners ===
The following police officers have been promoted in rank and appointed to serve as the commissioner of Tasmania Police:

List of commissioners of Tasmania Police
Order	Commissioner	Term begin	Term end	Term in office	Comments, including reason for leaving office	Notes
1	George Richardson	1 January 1899	1 January 1905	6 years, 0 days	Retired as Commissioner.	
2	Colonel John E C Lord CMG DSO VD	July 1906	10 February 1916	30 years, 336 days	Born 8 May 1870, acting commissioner from 1905 to 1906. On 10 February 1916 granted leave of absence to serve with the 40th Tasmanian Battalion 1st AIF. Returned on 4 August 1919. Retired as Commissioner.	
2	Colonel John E C Lord CMG DSO VD	4 August 1919	24 November 1940	30 years, 336 days	Born 8 May 1870, acting commissioner from 1905 to 1906. On 10 February 1916 granted leave of absence to serve with the 40th Tasmanian Battalion 1st AIF. Returned on 4 August 1919. Retired as Commissioner.	
3	Walter Oakes MBE RVM	25 November 1940	26 June 1944	3 years, 214 days	Born Tasmania 29 June 1878, joined Tasmania Police 7 May 1900. Resigned in 1913, served in Army, returned as a Detective Sergeant in 1918. Retired as Commissioner.	
4	Harry Hill	27 June 1944	17 October 1949	5 years, 112 days	Born Tasmania 7 October 1884. Joined Tasmania Police 18 May 1907. Retired as Commissioner.	
5	Malcolm Dowling	18 October 1949	31 December 1952	3 years, 74 days	Born Tasmania 19 June 1888, joined Tasmania Police 11 July 1910. Retired as Commissioner.	
6	William Delderfield MVO	1 January 1953	25 September 1965	12 years, 267 days	Born UK 6 February 1901, joined South Australia Police 1 April 1922. Deputy Commissioner of Tasmania Police 1 December 1949. Retired as Commissioner.	
7	Philip Fletcher CBE MVO	25 September 1965	8 July 1974	8 years, 286 days	Born Victoria 8 July 1914. Joined Tasmania Police 8 October 1935. Retired as Commissioner.	
8	Eric Knowles QPM	9 July 1974	January 1977	2 years, 206 days	Born 23 August 1914. Joined Tasmania Police 1940. Died in office as Commissioner.	
9	Max Robinson AO QPM	7 May 1977	31 January 1988	10 years, 269 days	Born 21 February 1929. Joined NSW Police as cadet 1945, transferred to ACT Police 1948. Retired as Commissioner.	
10	William (Bill) Horman APM	1 February 1988	30 March 1991	3 years, 57 days	Born 15 August 1939, joined Victoria Police 1956, Vanuatu Police in 1981, Deputy Director, Australian Bureau of Criminal Intelligence, 1983. Retired as Commissioner.	
11	John Johnson APM	1 July 1991	12 July 1996	5 years, 11 days	Born 12 July 1936. Joined Victoria Police 10 May 1957, ACT Police 20 October 1958. Retired as Commissioner.	
12	Richard McCreadie AO APM	August 1996	7 March 2008	11 years, 219 days	Born 22 April 1946. Joined Tasmania Police 15 October 1964, Deputy Commissioner January 1991. Retired as Commissioner.	
13	Jack Johnston APM	8 March 2008	14 August 2008	159 days	Joined Tasmania Police 9 February 1968, Deputy Commissioner 1996. Stood down and bailed to appear in the Supreme Court of Tasmania on 2 February over allegations he disclosed official secrets. His predecessor, Richard McCreadie, was appointed as Acting Commissioner in October 2008, however McCreadie's interim re-appointment was withdrawn after it was realised that the Police Service Act 2003 (Tas) states that in circumstances where the Commissioner is not available, that the Deputy Police Commissioner should take his place.	
14	Darren Hine AO APM	11 October 2010	11 October 2022	12 years, 0 days days	Career with Tasmania Police; previously Deputy Commissioner; acting Commissioner between 2008 and 2010.	
15	Donna Adams PSM APM	11 October 2022	incumbent	4 years, 34 days		

== Tasmania Police Academy ==
The Tasmania Police Academy is located in the suburb of Rokeby on Hobart's Eastern Shore.

Local training of police officers in Tasmania began in 1958 at Sackville Street in Hobart. In 1960, Commissioner Delderfield suggested the establishment of a police training college on Hobart's eastern shore, and the idea was discussed until Commissioner Phil Fletcher managed to get the proposal approved by cabinet on 16 December 1969. Several sites were considered until Rokeby was selected.

The main road into the Tasmania Police Academy, Phil Fletcher Drive, was named in his honour.

The Academy was officially opened on 6 March 1976 by the Premier of Tasmania, Bill Neilson. The Tasmania Police Academy was the first purpose-built Police Academy in Australia.

The Tasmania Police Academy offers training for Tasmania Police recruits, currently serving Tasmania Police officers, and is offered as a community resource to various local community groups.

== Equipment ==
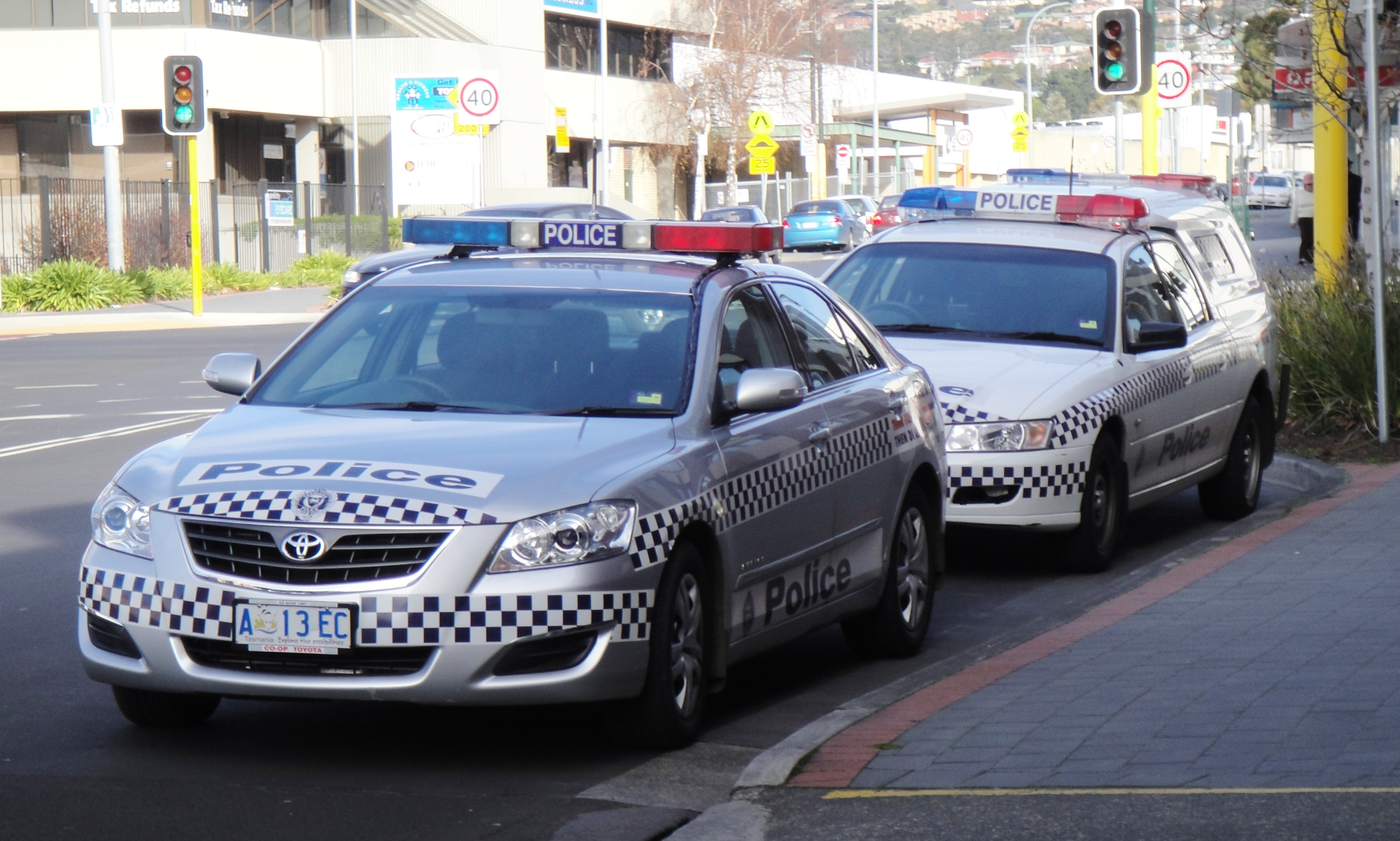
Tasmania Police vehicles

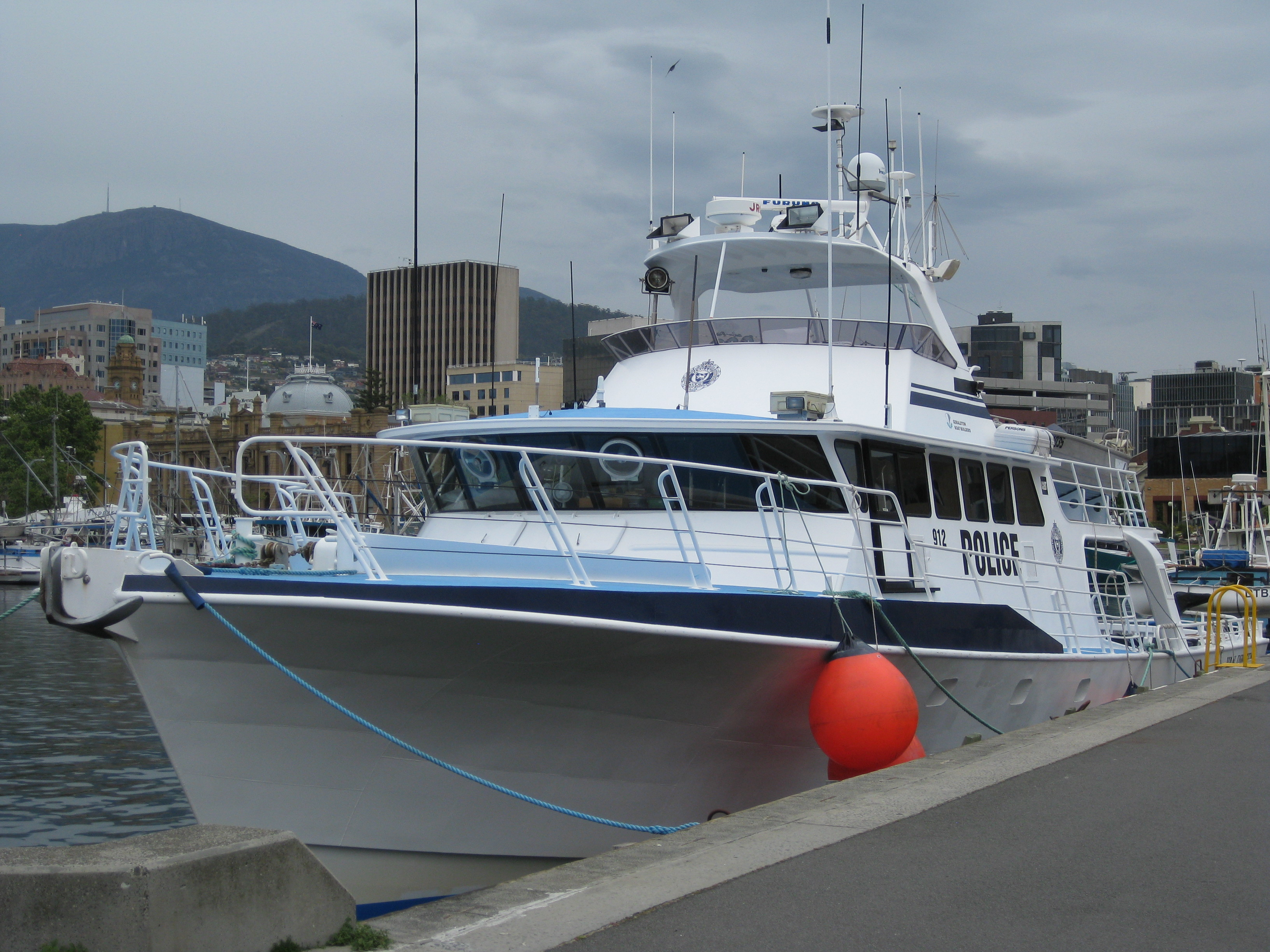
The PV Van Diemen, a boat operated by Tasmania Police

=== Firearms ===
The general-issue Glock 17 9-mm semi-automatic pistol retains the "three-tier" safety features of the original model, and does not include any special features specific to Tasmania Police. Contrary to popular belief, there was never a Glock model specifically developed for use that was unique to Tasmania Police. Tasmania Police underwent a period of individual issue of the weapon until the adoption of the Glock 17 as the standard-issue weapon in 1999. The Smith & Wesson Model 10 revolver is no longer issued or carried by Tasmania Police.

The Glock 19 compact pistol has been issued mainly to traffic sections, and the Glock 26 sub-compact model was adopted as the general-issue sidearm for detectives and covert units. A degree of individual preference of model adopted by the individual officer exists to this day.

=== Operational equipment ===
In addition to firearms, police are also equipped with an expandable baton and OC spray. In April 2015, the Multiuse Integrated Protection Vest (MIPV) was issued, a combination of a load bearing vest and a ballistic vest, with a high visibility over garment, together with a new uniform.

Tasmania Police evaluated the use of taser stun guns in 2009, but the decision was made not to issue tasers to frontline officers. Currently, only officers of the Special Operations Group are authorised to carry tasers. In 2025, a 12-month trial of tasers for up to fifty frontline officers was announced.

In August 2018, Tasmania Police began the rollout of body worn cameras to frontline officers, as part of a $3.4 million program to deploy them across the whole force over four years.

=== Vehicles ===
The first radio-equipped vehicles adopted by Tasmania Police were FX Holden sedans, with ten of these acquired in 1950. Ford Fairlane cars were adopted in 1960 for use by the Criminal Investigative Branch, and over the years various makes of Holden, Ford and Toyota have been used. Notably the Traffic division adopted Nissan Skyline Silhouette pursuit cars in the late 1980s.

Tasmania Police vehicles are based around several platforms, including the Hybrid Toyota RAV4, Hyundai Santa Fe, Kia Sorento for general (urban) patrol. The Highway Patrol utilise a variety of makes and models employed on a "best-suitability" basis including Subaru Outback and BMW 3 series M340i models.The Ford Ranger and Isuzu D Max are currently used as base vehicles for divisional vans, fitted with a custom Varley-brand rotary-moulded, "pod" for transport of prisoners. Divisional vans are also predominantly used as patrol-support vehicles, to transport people under-arrest who have displayed a propensity for violence.

The BMW R1200RT-P motorcycle is the primary motorcycle used in Tasmania, to supplement traffic control and enforcement duties, as well as assist with dignitaries and official ceremonial duties.

Tasmania Police general patrol vehicles are equipped with mobile data terminals, used to interrogate criminal and traffic databases. They also have a general exemption against the Tasmanian government's "green-fleet" designations, as most vehicles under this designation are unsuitable for policing duties, and do not comply with Australian standards for the minimum requirements for Australian police vehicles.

=== Helicopters ===
Since January 2026, aviation support has been provided to Tasmania Police by private company Starflight who operate three Bell 412 helicopters that also provides aviation support to Ambulance Tasmania. The three Bell 412 helicopters will be replaced by three Airbus H145 D3 helicopters in late 2027 and will be based in Hobart.

== Tasmania Police Pipe Band ==
The Tasmania Police Pipe Band was formed in 1969, and wears the Fletcher of Dunans tartan in honour of the Commissioner of Police at the time Mr PW Fletcher. The band is also recognised as the marching band for the Royal Tasmania Regiment, and wears the regiment badge with rosette device on its tartan.

== Tasmania Police Medal ==
The Tasmania Police Medal is awarded to sworn officers of the Tasmania Police, for diligent and ethical service.

The medal is circular and nickel-silver, with the obverse featuring the outline of Tasmania emblazoned with the heraldic lion in the centre. The words Tasmania Police around the central device, and 'For diligent and ethical service' around the vertical edges. The ribbon is the same as some other state police medals.

== See also ==
- Tasmania Police Special Operations Group
