= Eric Abetz =

Australian politician (born 1958)

The Honourable Eric Abetz MP
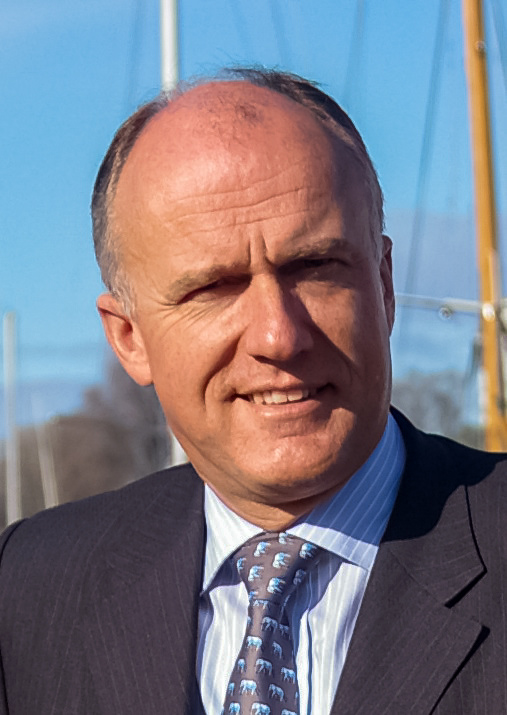
- Abetz in 2010
Federal ministries and positions
Leader of the Government in the Senate
In office 18 September 2013 – 21 September 2015
Prime Minister	Tony Abbott; Malcolm Turnbull
Deputy	George Brandis
Preceded by	Penny Wong
Succeeded by	George Brandis
Minister for Employment
In office 18 September 2013 – 21 September 2015
Prime Minister	Tony Abbott; Malcolm Turnbull
Preceded by	Bill Shorten
Succeeded by	Michaelia Cash
Leader of the Opposition in the Senate
In office 3 May 2010 – 18 September 2013
Deputy	George Brandis
Leader	Tony Abbott
Preceded by	Nick Minchin
Succeeded by	Penny Wong
Minister for Fisheries, Forestry and Conservation
In office 27 January 2006 – 3 December 2007
Prime Minister	John Howard
Preceded by	Ian Macdonald
Succeeded by	Office abolished
Special Minister of State
In office 30 January 2001 – 27 January 2006
Prime Minister	John Howard
Preceded by	Chris Ellison
Succeeded by	Gary Nairn
Senator for Tasmania
In office 22 February 1994 – 30 June 2022
Preceded by	Brian Archer
Succeeded by	Tammy Tyrrell

Member of the Tasmanian House of Assembly for Franklin
- Incumbent
- Assumed office 23 March 2024 Serving with 6 others

Treasurer of Tasmania
- Incumbent
- Assumed office 19 July 2025
- Premier: Jeremy Rockliff
- Preceded by: Guy Barnett

Leader of the House
- Incumbent
- Assumed office 11 April 2024
- Premier: Jeremy Rockliff
- Preceded by: Nic Street

Minister for Macquarie Point Urban Renewal
- Incumbent
- Assumed office 7 August 2025
- Premier: Jeremy Rockliff
- Preceded by: Position created
Former state ministries
Minister for Business, Industry and Resources Small Business, Industry and Resources (April-October 2024)
In office 11 April 2024 – 19 July 2025
Premier	Jeremy Rockliff
Preceded by	Felix Ellis
Succeeded by	Felix Ellis
Minister for Transport
In office 11 April 2024 – 19 July 2025
Premier	Jeremy Rockliff
Preceded by	Michael Ferguson
Minister for Arts and Heritage Minister for Community and Multicultural Affairs Minister for Environment
In office 2 June 2026 – 9 June 2026
Premier	Jeremy Rockliff
Preceded by	Madeleine Ogilvie
Succeeded by	Jane Howlett (as Minister for Arts and Minister for Community and Multicultural Affairs); Guy Barnett (as Minister for Environment and Climate Change)

Personal details
- Born: 25 January 1958 (age 68) Stuttgart, Baden-Württemberg, West Germany
- Citizenship: Australian (1974–present); West German (1958–1974)
- Party: Liberal
- Education: University of Tasmania
- Profession: Lawyer
- Website: abetz.com.au

Eric Abetz (born 25 January 1958) is an Australian politician. He was a Senator for Tasmania from 1994 to 2022, representing the Liberal Party, and since March 2024 has been a member of the Tasmanian House of Assembly for the Franklin electorate.

He was the Minister for Employment and the Leader of the Government in the Senate in the Abbott government from 2013 to 2015. He previously also served as Special Minister of State in the Howard government from 2001 to 2006 and as Minister for Fisheries, Forestry and Conservation from 2006 to 2007.

Born in Germany, Abetz emigrated to Australia as a small child, when his father came to work for Tasmania's Hydro Electric Commission. He was educated at the University of Tasmania and was a barrister and solicitor before entering politics. He is a former national president of the Australian Liberal Students' Federation and was state president of the Tasmanian Liberals from 1990 to 1994.

== Personal life & education ==
The youngest of six children, Abetz emigrated from Germany to Australia with his parents in 1961. His father, Walter Abetz, a radio technician in the Nazi Germany armed forces who lost a leg fighting on the Russian Front, came to Australia to work for Tasmania's Hydro Electric Commission, which had advertised for skilled workers in German newspapers.

Eric Abetz's great uncle, Otto Abetz, was a Nazi SS officer, German ambassador to Vichy France, and a convicted war criminal. Eric's grandfather was Karl Abetz, a professor of forestry science, who joined the Nazi Party in 1933 and became general consultant of the Reich Forestry Office in 1942.

Abetz married Michelle Oates in 1991, and they had three children. His wife died of cancer in 2019. He is a Christian.

Abetz's brother, Peter Abetz, was the Liberal member for Southern River in the Legislative Assembly of Western Australia from the 2008 state election until 2017.

Abetz studied at Taroona High School, Hobart Matriculation College and the University of Tasmania, earning degrees in law and arts in 1981. He served as president of the University of Tasmania Liberal Club, and in 1980–1981, he became the first Tasmanian to become national president of the Australian Liberal Students' Federation, during which time he came into political conflict with Nick Sherry and Sue Mackay, both later to be Australian Labor Party senators.

== Early political career (1993–2007) ==
He won preselection as a candidate for the Senate in the 1984 and 1993 elections but did not win a seat. He was then chosen to fill the casual vacancy caused by the resignation of Brian Archer in 1994, and was elected in his own right at the subsequent 1998 election and re-elected in 2004, 2010 and 2016. Abetz was Parliamentary Secretary to the Minister for Defence 1998–2001 and was Special Minister of State from January 2001 until 2006.

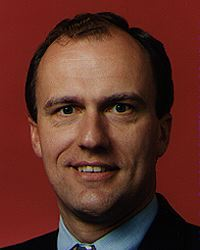
Abetz in 1996.

He has served as Chairman of the Native Title and the Aboriginal and Torres Strait Islander Land Fund Committee and Chairman of the Senate Legal and Constitutional Affairs Legislation Committee. He also served as Chairman of the Attorney-General and Justice Government Members' Committee.

He was a member of a Parliamentary Delegation which visited France and Belgium in June and July 1997, and made an official visit to the United Kingdom in September 1999.

He was Minister for Forestry from a reshuffle of the Howard ministry in January 2006 until its defeat at the 2007 election. He commenced his portfolio by attacking the Australian Greens and environmentalists in general as anti-Australian. He described the campaign against woodchipping as "akin to treason" and branded the Greens an "extreme left" party. This allowed him to position the government's priorities as mainstream issues which both major parties wanted action on.

Abetz is a member of the National Right faction of the Liberal Party.

== Later federal political career (2007–2022) ==
=== 2009 OzCar affair ===
In mid-2009 Abetz was a central figure in the OzCar affair, which involved false allegations that Prime Minister Kevin Rudd and Treasurer Wayne Swan had improperly given favourable treatment to a car dealer, John Grant, who was a friend of the Prime Minister. At a Senate inquiry on 19 June, Abetz asked a series of questions of a Treasury official, Godwin Grech, who testified that he had a "recollection" that a member of Rudd's staff had sent him an email in February, asking that he provide preferential treatment to Grant. Abetz read out the text of what he said was an email, which purported to ask for preferential treatment for Grant. On 4 August 2009, Grech admitted that he had forged the email. Abetz then issued an apology, saying: "I am not only sorry to Malcolm Turnbull but to the Australian people and any anguish that may have been occasioned to Kevin Rudd and other people."

=== Eligibility to hold Senate office ===
On 30 July 2010, Tasmanian resident John Hawkins lodged an objection to Abetz's nomination for re-election, alleging that Abetz still held dual citizenship of both his birthplace, Germany, and Australia and thus was ineligible under Section 44 of the Constitution of Australia. Hawkins subsequently withdrew the petition to the High Court of Australia.

=== Minister under the Abbott government ===
In September 2013 Abetz was appointed Minister for Employment in the Abbott government and oversaw the drafting of legislation to reestablish the Australian Building and Construction Commission, the establishment of a Registered Organisations Commission following the Craig Thomson Affair, and the launching of the Royal Commission into trade union governance and corruption and Fair Work Act Review. Abetz also designed and implemented the Government's Jobactive Employment Services Reforms.

In August 2014 Abetz received criticism from the media and politicians such as the Greens' Adam Bandt for making claims of a link between abortion and breast cancer when appearing on The Project. He had been on The Project to discuss his association with the World Congress of Families.

It was reported in May 2015 that Abetz was quoted as saying of Joe de Bruyn, national president of the SDA, the largest private sector trade union in Australia, that "he is a role model of trade union officialdom. He is the type of official that gives trade unionism a good name." De Bruyn spent 36 years as National Secretary of the SDA, known for its close relationships with major employers such as Coles and Woolworths. De Bruyn had also been known for his staunch and vocal opposition to same-sex marriage.

=== Dropped from ministry ===
Abetz was dropped from the First Turnbull Ministry upon the ascension of the Turnbull government, with George Brandis succeeding Abetz as Leader of the Government in the Senate. In the three days where Abetz was Prime Minister Malcolm Turnbull's representative in the Senate Abetz said "The King is dead, long live the King" in reference to the leadership change.

Abetz is a Protestant Christian and a member of the Christian Reformed Churches of Australia. Throughout his political career he has been variously associated with conservative groups, including the Association of Christian Parent Controlled Schools, Salt Shakers, Focus on the Family, Lyons Forum, Endeavour Forum, Family Council of Victoria, Fatherhood Foundation, Australian Christian Lobby, Australian Family Association and Right to Life Australia. In October 2015, Abetz attracted controversy after referring to Justice Clarence Thomas of the U.S. Supreme Court as a "negro American" during a radio interview.

In 2017 when Cory Bernardi moved a motion to ban abortion on gender grounds Abetz was 1 of the 10 who voted Yes on the Motion. It was voted down with (10–36).

Abetz is a public opponent of same-sex marriage, and was one of twelve senators who voted against the Marriage Amendment (Definition and Religious Freedoms) Act 2017, which legalised same-sex marriage in Australia.

During Senate debates regarding the Nuclear Fuel Cycle (Facilitation) Bill, presented by Senator Cory Bernardi in November 2017, Abetz strongly endorsed the prospect of nuclear power in Australia. He described nuclear power as "the very best source of energy production that science has to offer the world" and claimed that it offered "affordable and reliable energy, with no emissions at all."

=== 2021 alleged "slut-shaming" comments ===
On 24 March 2021, two days after Tasmanian House of Assembly speaker Sue Hickey resigned from the Liberal Party to sit as an independent, Hickey accused Abetz in the House of making "slut-shaming" comments on Brittany Higgins, who allegedly had been raped by a male staffer in the Federal Parliament in Canberra. Hickey claimed that Abetz had told her at a citizenship ceremony in Hobart on 1 March:

As for that Higgins girl, anybody so disgustingly drunk who would sleep with anybody could have slept with one of our spies and put the security of the nation at risk.

Hickey also alleged that Abetz had told her "not to worry" about the separate allegation against federal Attorney-General Christian Porter that he had raped a woman in 1988, as "the woman is dead and the law will protect [Porter]". Abetz "categorically denied" making any of these comments and accused Hickey of "trying to destroy the [Liberal] party". Hickey responded to Abetz by accusing him of "grubby politics" and said that she stood by her statement.

Later, on 24 March, Tasmanian Premier Peter Gutwein wrote to Prime Minister Scott Morrison, stating that Hickey had raised the matter of Abetz's comments with him weeks earlier and requested Morrison to "consider the matters raised".

=== Defeat at 2022 federal election ===
Since entering the Senate, Abetz was always placed first in Liberal Party preselection for Senate elections, which all but guaranteed him winning one of the six Senate seats normally available for the state. On 8 May 2021, it was announced that, for the next federal election, he had been dropped to third place, substantially reducing his prospect of re-election. This ended up costing him his seat at the election in May 2022, as Jacqui Lambie Network candidate Tammy Tyrrell won the state's sixth Senate seat ahead of Abetz. As a result, his Senate term ended on 30 June 2022.

On 31 August 2022, the Australian Monarchist League announced Abetz as Campaign Director of the Vote No Republic campaign.

== State politics ==
On 7 January 2024, it was reported that Abetz would seek the preselection of the Liberal Party as a candidate for Franklin at the 2024 Tasmanian state election.

On 23 March 2024, Abetz was elected to the Tasmanian House of Assembly for the Franklin electorate. Abetz was appointed as Minister for Business, Industry and Resources and Minister for Transport in the Rockliff Government as well as leader of the House.

Abetz was re-elected at the 2025 Tasmanian state election.

He was appointed as the inaugural Minister for Macquarie Point Urban Renewal.

Parliament of Australia
Preceded by Brian Archer	Senator for Tasmania; 1994–2022	Succeeded by Tammy Tyrrell
Political offices
Preceded by Chris Ellison	Special Minister of State; 2001–2006	Succeeded by Gary Nairn
Preceded by Ian Macdonald	Minister for Fisheries, Forestry and Conservation; 2006–2007	Title abolished
Preceded by Brendan O'Connor as Minister for Employment and Minister for Skills and Training	Minister for Employment; 2013–2015	Succeeded by Michaelia Cash
Party political offices
Preceded by Nick Minchin	Leader of the Liberal Party in the Senate; 2010–2015	Succeeded by George Brandis
