= Tasmania Parks and Wildlife Service =

Government body of Tasmania, Australia

Agency overview
- Formed: 1 November 1971
- Jurisdiction: Government of Tasmania
- Agency executive: Jason Jacobi, Deputy Secretary
- Parent agency: Department of Natural Resources and Environment
- Website: parks.tas.gov.au

Tasmania Parks and Wildlife Service (PWS) is the Tasmanian Government agency responsible for managing protected areas in Tasmania, such as national parks, historic sites and regional reserves. Historically, it has also had responsibility for managing wildlife, including game.

== History ==
The National Parks and Wildlife Service was set up on 1 November 1971 after controversy surrounding the proposal to flood Lake Pedder and the unsuccessful attempts to prevent the project going ahead. A Select Committee formed from the interested parties recommended the establishment of a professional park service to properly manage the natural environment in Tasmania, and to replace the former Scenery Preservation and Animals & Birds Protection Boards, previously responsible for scenic reserves (including national parks) and wildlife sanctuaries respectively.

The new service initially had a staff of 59 under inaugural Director Peter Murrell. The National Parks and Wildlife Act 1970 had made new provisions for the conservation of fauna and flora and the establishment and management of national parks and reserves. Existing national parks at the time included Ben Lomond, Cradle Mountain-Lake St Clair, Freycinet, Mt Field, Rocky Cape and Southwest. Former wildlife sanctuaries Mount William, Maria Island and Narawntapu were set up as national parks and Macquarie Island designated a nature reserve.

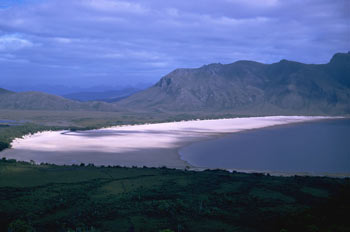
Lake Pedder in 1970 before it was flooded, part of Lake Pedder National Park from 1955 and Southwest National Park from 1968. The furore surrounding the flooding led directly to the formation of the National Parks and Wildlife Service, the forerunner of Tasmania Parks and Wildlife Service.

The creation of an Archaeology Section within the service followed the passing of the Aboriginal Relics Act 1975. In the following year Precipitous Bluff was incorporated into the Southwest National Park. Controversy in 1979 over the proposed Lower Gordon hydro-electric power scheme, which would have flooded the Franklin River, led to the creation of the Franklin-Lower Gordon Wild Rivers National Park in 1981 (construction of the dam was stopped by a Federal Court ruling in 1983). The Walls of Jerusalem National Park was also created in June 1981.

Until 1987 the service operated relatively independently and, since then, has had a chequered history within the structure of the Tasmanian bureaucracy, being initially merged in that year with the Department of Lands, to form the Department of Lands, Parks and Wildlife, and relocated to new premises.

In 1989 the Department of Lands, Parks and Wildlife split to become the Department of Environment and Planning and the Department of Parks, Wildlife and Heritage, which managed Crown land as well as the reserves, and with duties to conserve wildlife and historic heritage sites. The Royal Tasmanian Botanical Gardens and the Port Arthur Historic Site Management Authority also became part of this new Department.

In the same year the Douglas-Apsley National Park, important for its dry sclerophyll forests, was established in the east of the state. The Tasmanian Wilderness World Heritage Area was expanded to include the Central Plateau Conservation Area. With other additions the World Heritage Area increased to 13,800 square kilometres (5,300 sq mi), approximately 20% of Tasmania's land area.

In 1991, Tasmania's first marine protected areas were established at Maria Island, Governor Island, Tinderbox and Ninepin Point, and the service's original Director, Peter Murrell, retired. Also in that year, an existing reserve known since 1951 as Hartz Mountains National Park was formally named as such.

On 3 February 1993, the Department once again merged, this time becoming the Department of Environment and Land Management (DELM), with the Parks and Wildlife Service functioning as a separate division. In that year the introduction of park fees allowed the service to fund projects aimed at visitors including visitor centres and official trails.

In 1995 several areas of land previously managed by the service were transferred to the Aboriginal Land Council of Tasmania and an Aboriginal Heritage Unit was created to provide training for Aboriginal community members, to help facilitate their advising on Aboriginal heritage management.

In 1996 the Mole Creek Karst National Park was created and South Bruny National Park followed in October 1997.

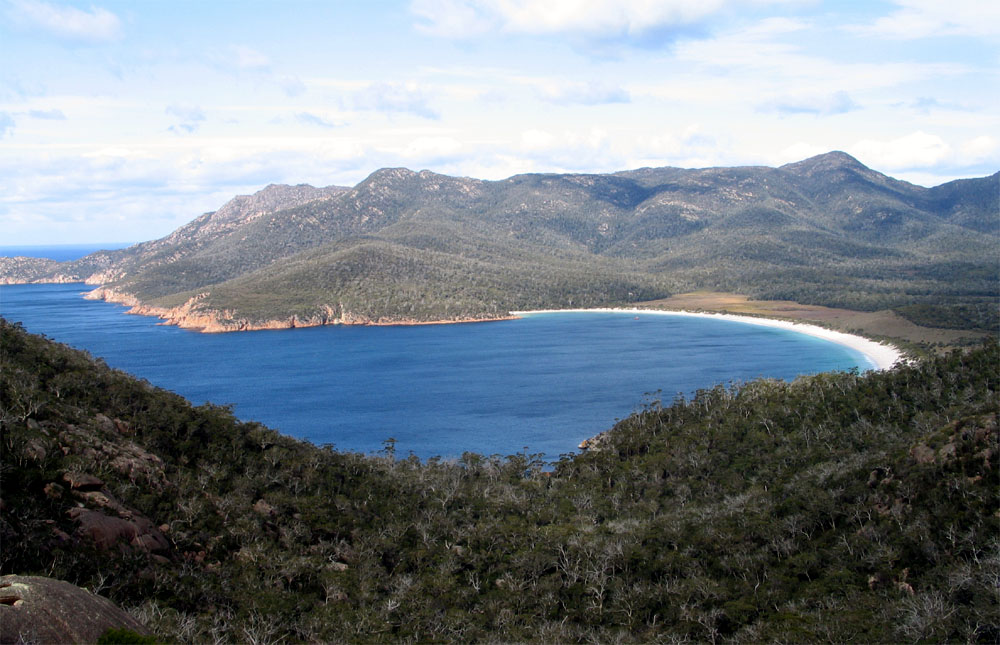
Wineglass Bay, part of Freycinet National Park which was expanded under the Regional Forest Agreement

Under the 1998 Tasmanian Regional Forest Agreement (RFA) an extra 3,960 square kilometres (1,530 sq mi) of public land were added to Tasmania's reserves, expanding the amount of public land in reserves by 17%. The RFA also expanded Mount William and Freycinet National Parks, and created Tasman and Savage River National Parks. Offsetting these gains were 700 square kilometres (270 sq mi) of reserves that were made available for forestry development.

A further departmental merger occurred after the 1998 state elections with the Department of Primary Industries and Fisheries, and the Government Analytical and Forensic Laboratories (GAFL) coming on board, creating the Department of Primary Industries, Water and Environment (DPIWE). The Parks and Wildlife Service was split into two separate divisions: the Resource Management and Conservation Division had responsibility for natural and cultural resources, and the Parks and Wildlife Service covered Tasmania's parks, reserves and World Heritage Areas.

In April 1999 an existing reserve on Flinders Island, known since 1967 as Strzelecki National Park, was formally named as such.

In August 2000, state waters surrounding sub-antarctic Macquarie Island were declared a marine protected area around 747 square kilometres (288 sq mi) in area.

In December 2001 three Bass Strait islands, Deal, Erith and Dover, were declared part of the Kent Group National Park and, in 2005, marine protected areas were created there and at Port Davey-Bathurst Harbour.

The Parks and Wildlife Service was separated from the DPIWE following the 2002 state elections, becoming part of the Department of Tourism, Parks, Heritage and the Arts (DTPHA), while the Resource Management and Conservation Division remained part of the DPIWE.

In April 2006 the DTPHA incorporated the Environment Division from the DPIWE, becoming the Department of Tourism, Arts and the Environment and, subsequently, in March 2008, the Department of Environment, Parks, Heritage and the Arts (DEPHA).

In 2007 the Tasmanian Coast Conservation Fund was established. Tour company operator Robert Pennicott, founder of Bruny Island Cruises and Tasman Island Cruises, came together with environmental group WILDCARE to establish the fund. While operating separately to the Tasmanian Parks and Wildlife Service, the fund is used to provide funding to the Parks and Wildlife Service to assist in environmental protection and conservation projects in Tasmania's National Parks.

From July 2009, the DEPHA ceased to exist, and the Parks and Wildlife Service became part of the new Department of Primary Industries, Parks, Water and Environment (DPIPWE).

From December 2021 the name of the Parks and Wildlife Service's parent department was changed to the Department of Natural Resources and Environment.

== See also ==
- National Council for Fire & Emergency Services
- NSW National Parks & Wildlife Service
- Parks Victoria
- Queensland Parks and Wildlife Service
- National Parks and Wildlife Service South Australia
- Department of Biodiversity, Conservation and Attractions
- Parks and Wildlife Commission of the Northern Territory
- ACT Parks and Conservation Service
- Director of National Parks (Australian Federal Government)
