= Bridget Archer =

Australian politician (born 1975)

The Honourable Bridget Archer MP
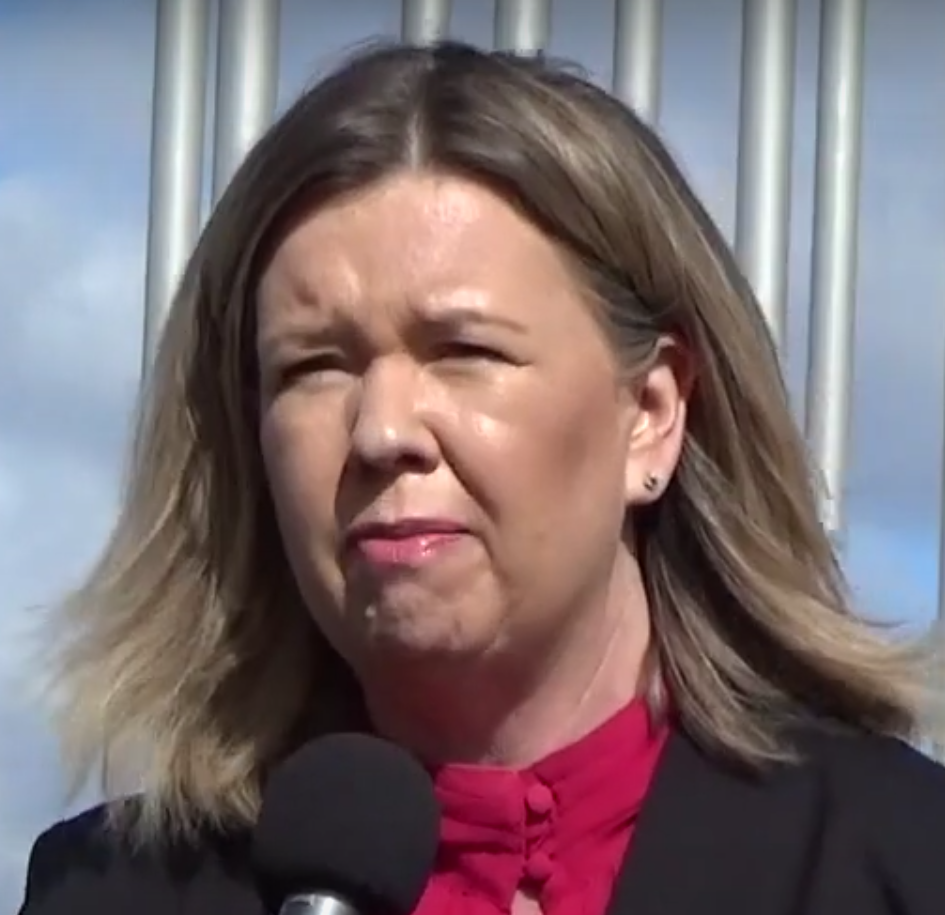
- Archer in 2022

Minister for Health, Mental Health and Wellbeing
- Incumbent
- Assumed office 11 August 2025
- Premier: Jeremy Rockliff
- Preceded by: Jacquie Petrusma

Minister for Aboriginal Affairs
- Incumbent
- Assumed office 11 August 2025
- Premier: Jeremy Rockliff
- Preceded by: Roger Jaensch

Minister for Ageing
- Incumbent
- Assumed office 11 August 2025
- Premier: Jeremy Rockliff
- Preceded by: position created

Member of the Tasmanian House of Assembly for Bass
- Incumbent
- Assumed office 19 July 2025

Member of the Australian Parliament for Bass
- In office 18 May 2019 – 3 May 2025
- Preceded by: Ross Hart
- Succeeded by: Jess Teesdale

Personal details
- Born: 18 May 1975 (age 51) Hobart, Tasmania, Australia
- Party: Liberal
- Education: University of Tasmania
- Occupation: Farmer

Bridget Kathleen Archer (born 18 May 1975) is an Australian politician who currently serves as a member of the Tasmanian House of Assembly for the state division of Bass since 2025. Archer was previously a member of the House of Representatives for the federal Division of Bass from 2019 to 2025.

Archer is a member of the Liberal Party. Since August 2025, she has served as a minister in the third Rockliff ministry.

== Early life ==
Archer was born in Hobart, Tasmania, to a teenage mother. As a six-week-old baby, she was adopted by bank workers Barry and Marian Whelan, who already had a son and daughter. The Whelans separated when Archer was eight and she remained with her adoptive father. However, he died not long after, and Archer moved to Ravenswood, a suburb of Launceston, to live with her mother, who had remarried. Archer revealed that she was subjected to sexual abuse by her stepfather, whom she has described as "an aggressive, emotionally abusive and controlling alcoholic".

She attended Ravenswood Primary School but was then sent to board at Launceston Church Grammar School, only ten minutes from her home, on the insistence of her stepfather. The turmoil in her family life contributed to "misbehaviour and recklessness". She was expelled from Launceston Grammar, and failed Year 12. Despite that, she was admitted to the University of Tasmania, although she soon dropped out. She worked at the Tasmanian Herbarium from 1995 to 1999, as a botanical curator, and later worked in "a variety of mostly casual administrative and hospitality jobs", including at the 2000 Summer Olympics, before returning to university. She completed a Bachelor of Arts in English and political science, followed by a graduate certificate in international politics.

== Local government ==
Archer was elected to the George Town Council in 2009. She served as deputy mayor from 2011 to 2014 and then as mayor until resigning in 2019 to enter federal politics.

== Political career ==
Archer is a member of the moderate faction of the Liberal Party.

=== Federal politics ===
In November 2018, Archer announced that she would run for Liberal preselection in Bass. She was elected to parliament at the 2019 federal election, which took place on her 44th birthday. She defeated the incumbent Australian Labor Party (ALP) candidate Ross Hart.

In December 2020, Archer publicly criticised the Morrison government's trial of a cashless debit card to deliver welfare payments, stating that she would oppose its use within her own electorate and describing it as a "punitive measure enacted on the presumption that all welfare recipients within the trial areas are incapable of managing their finances and require the government's assistance". The House of Representatives passed legislation to make the card permanent by one vote, with Archer abstaining from voting despite her earlier criticism.

Archer has crossed the floor a number of times, including:

- 25 November 2021, to support a motion by Helen Haines that called for a debate on a national anti-corruption commission.
- 10 February 2022, with four other Liberal MPs, to include protection for transgender students in the government's modifications to the Sex Discrimination Act.
- 4 August 2022, the sole member of the Liberal Party and National Party coalition to cross the floor to vote in favour of the government's 43% carbon emissions reduction target legislation.
- 30 November 2022, the sole member of the Liberal Party and National Party coalition to cross the floor to vote in favour of the Labor government's motion to censure former prime minister Scott Morrison over his secret appointment to several ministries; she said that she was registering support, as a Liberal, for the rule of law.
- 15 February 2023, voting with the government on a bill to establish the Housing Australia Future Fund.
- 6 September 2023, joining a number of crossbench MPs in voting for a motion by Andrew Wilkie calling on the government to cease the prosecutions of whistleblowers David McBride and Richard Boyle. The Labor Party and the rest of the Coalition voted against.
- 19 October 2023, voting against a motion by Peter Dutton related to his call for a royal commission into child sexual abuse in indigenous communities and an audit of government spending on indigenous Australians. She was opposed to targeting indigenous people specifically, and against more talking when action was required.
- 14 February 2024, the sole member of the Liberal Party and National Party coalition to cross the floor to vote in favour of urging the US and UK to allow Julian Assange to return safely to Australia.
- 27 November 2024, the sole member of the Liberal/National coalition to cross the floor to vote against legislation banning under 16 year olds from social media.

In November 2023, it was reported that there was a push by some Liberals for her to leave the party, with fellow northern Tasmanian MP Gavin Pearce supposedly an opponent.

In March 2024, she said that she felt marginalised within the Liberal Party, with fewer moderates around. She claimed that her views hadn't changed, but the party had shifted to the right, becoming "One Nation lite".

In the 2025 federal election she was defeated by Labor candidate Jess Teesdale.

=== State politics ===
Archer served as secretary and treasurer of the Liberal Party's George Town branch from 2012 to 2013. Archer unsuccessfully contested the 2018 Tasmanian election.

Following her defeat at the previous federal election, Archer was elected to the state seat of Bass at the 2025 Tasmanian State election, gaining the most votes of any candidate in the division.

Archer was appointed Minister for Health, Mental Health and Wellbeing, Minister for Aboriginal Affairs and Minister for Aging in the Third Rockliff Ministry.

During Premier Jeremy Rockliff’s week long trade mission to Japan in July 2026, Archer served as Acting Premier of Tasmania, as Deputy Premier Guy Barnett was on leave.

== Personal life ==
Archer has five children with her husband Winston. After marrying, they moved to his family property outside George Town, where they farm sheep and beef cattle.

Parliament of Australia
| Preceded by Ross Hart | Member for Bass; 2019–2025 | Succeeded by Jess Teesdale |
