= Department of Natural Resources and Environment Tasmania =

Tasmanian government department

Department overview
- Formed: 3 February 1993
- Preceding agencies: Department of Environment and Planning; Department of Parks, Wildlife and Heritage
- Type: Government department
- Jurisdiction: Tasmanian Government
- Headquarters: 134 Macquarie Street, Hobart
- Employees: 1,554 (30 June 2025)
- Annual budget: $364 million (2026–27 FY)
- Ministers responsible: Bridget Archer, Minister for Aboriginal Affairs; Guy Barnett, Minister for Environment and Climate Change; Kerry Vincent, Minister for Housing and Planning and Minister for Local Government; Nick Duigan, Minister for Parks and Heritage; Gavin Pearce, Minister for Primary Industries and Water; Roger Jaensch, Minister for Racing
- Department executive: Jason Jacobi, Secretary
- Website: nre.tas.gov.au

The Department of Natural Resources and Environment Tasmania (NRE Tas) is the government department of the Tasmanian Government responsible for supporting primary industry development, the protection of Tasmania's natural environment, effective land and water management and the protection of Tasmania's relative disease and pest free status. NRE's responsibilities also include maintaining the security of land tenure, administration of much of the state's Crown lands and delivery of government services through Service Tasmania.

The department is led by its departmental secretary, Jason Jacobi.

== History ==
The department was formed on 3 February 1993, from the amalgamation of the Department of Environment and Planning and the Department of Parks, Wildlife and Heritage and was known as the Department of Environment and Land Management.

On 18 September 1998, the Department of Primary Industry and Fisheries was amalgamated with the department and the name was changed to the Department of Primary Industries, Water and Environment.

On 5 April 2006, the Environment Division of the department was amalgamated with the Department of Tourism, Arts and the Environment and the name was changed to the Department of Primary Industries and Water.

On 1 July 2009, parts of the Department of Environment, Parks, Heritage and the Arts were amalgamated with the department and the name was changed to the Department of Primary Industries, Parks, Water and Environment. This returned the DPIPWE to a similar size and structure as to what it was between 1998 and 2002. In 1996 the department entered into a joint venture agreement with the University of Tasmania to form the Tasmanian Institute of Agricultural Research (TIAR). Between 2005 and 2009 all DPIPWE's agricultural research, development and extension staff and facilities were transferred to TIAR.

In September 2021, it was announced that the Environment Protection Authority (EPA) would separate from the department into a standalone independent State Authority. The separation took effect on 1 December 2021.

On 1 December 2021, the name of the department was changed to the Department of Natural Resources and Environment Tasmania.

== Structure ==
The Department is divided into the following organisational groupings:

- Environment, Heritage and Land
  - Analytical Services Tasmania
  - Heritage and Land Tasmania
  - Environment
  - Waste and Resource Recovery
- Parks and Wildlife Service
- Primary Industries and Water
  - Agriculture, Forestry and Water
  - Biosecurity Tasmania
  - Marine Resources
  - Office of Racing Integrity
- Royal Tasmanian Botanical Gardens
- Strategy and Business Services
- Wellington Park Management Trust

== See also ==
- List of Tasmanian government agencies
