= Building Tasmania =

Tasmanian government department

Department overview
- Formed: 18 September 1998
- Preceding agencies: Department of Transport; Private Forests Tasmania; Workplace Standards Authority
- Type: Government department
- Jurisdiction: Tasmanian Government
- Headquarters: 4 Salamanca Place, Hobart
- Employees: 996 (30 September 2026)
- Annual budget: $1.277 billion (2026–27 FY)
- Ministers responsible: Kerry Vincent, Minister for Infrastructure and Transport, Minister for Housing and Planning and Minister for Local Government; Guy Barnett, Minister for Small Business, Trade and Consumer Affairs; Nick Duigan, Minister for Energy and Renewables and Minister for Sport; Felix Ellis, Minister for Business, Industry and Resources and Minister for Skills and Jobs; Roger Jaensch, Minister for Arts
- Department executive: Shane Gregory, Secretary
- Website: www.building.tas.gov.au

Building Tasmania is a Government of Tasmania department responsible for roads, housing, transport and infrastructure in Tasmania, Australia.

== History ==
The department was formed on 18 September 1998, from the amalgamation of the Department of Transport, Private Forests Tasmania, the Workplace Standards Authority and parts of other Government departments and was called the Department of Infrastructure, Energy and Resources.

On 1 July 2014, the Department of Economic Development, Tourism and the Arts was amalgamated with the department and the name changed to the Department of State Growth.

In March 2026, Premier of Tasmania Jeremy Rockliff announced that the Department of State Growth would be abolished and replaced by Building Tasmania effective from 2 July 2026 with an expectation 250 jobs would be abolished.

On 2 July 2026, the Department of State Growth was renamed Building Tasmania.

On 13 August 2026, Building Tasmania's climate change office was transferred to the Department of Natural Resources and Environment Tasmania.

On 10 September responsibility for capital projects was transferred to Building Tasmania from other agencies.

On 3 December 2026, the Department of Premier & Cabinet will take over economic development, industry, energy and resources responsibilities from Building Tasmania. Homes Tasmania will become part of Building Tasmania.

== Structure ==
Building Tasmania has seven departments:

- Business Services
- Creative Industries, Sport & Planning
- Economic Development
- Infrastructure Delivery
- Infrastructure Strategy & Planning
- Renewables, Climate & Future Industries
- Transport
