= Tasmanian Government =

State government of Tasmania, Australia

- State government

Overview
- Established: 2 December 1856; 169 years ago as responsible colonial government; 1 January 1901; 125 years ago as an Australian state
- State: Tasmania
- Country: Australia
- Leader: Premier of Tasmania (Jeremy Rockliff)
- Appointed by: Governor of Tasmania (Barbara Baker) on behalf of the King (Charles III)
- Main organ: Executive Council of Tasmania; Cabinet of Tasmania
- Ministries: 8 Government Departments
- Responsible to: Parliament of Tasmania
- Annual budget: $8.7 billion (2023–2024)
- Headquarters: Executive Building; 15 Murray Street, Hobart
- Website: tas.gov.au

The Tasmanian Government is the executive branch of government of the Australian state of Tasmania. The leader of the party or coalition with the confidence of the House of Assembly, the lower house of the Parliament of Tasmania, is invited by the governor of Tasmania to form the executive. The governor appoints the premier of Tasmania.

Since 8 April 2022, the premier of Tasmania has been Jeremy Rockliff, leader of the Liberal Party. The current ministry of Tasmania is the Second Rockliff ministry.

== Constitutional framework ==
Tasmania is governed according to the principles of the Westminster system, a form of parliamentary responsible government based on the model of the United Kingdom. Legislative power rests with the bicameral Parliament of Tasmania, which consists of the governor of Tasmania, and the two chambers: the Legislative Council and the House of Assembly.

Executive power rests formally with the Executive Council, consisting of the governor and senior ministers, and informally called the Cabinet. In practice, executive power is exercised by the premier of Tasmania upon the advice of the Cabinet. Cabinet members are appointed by the governor but hold office by virtue of their ability to command the support of a majority of members of the House of Assembly.

Judicial power is exercised by the Supreme Court of Tasmania and a system of subordinate courts. As with all states, upon federation, Tasmania accepted the authority of the federal High Court of Australia to overrule the state judiciary.

== Cabinet of Tasmania ==
Party	Minister	Portfolio	Electorate
Executive government
	Jeremy Rockliff	Premier	Braddon HA
	Guy Barnett	Deputy Premier; Attorney-General; Minister for Justice, Corrections and Rehabilitation; Minister for Small Business, Trade and Consumer Affairs; Minister for Environment	Lyons HA
	Eric Abetz	Treasurer; Leader of the House; Minister for Macquarie Point Urban Renewal	Franklin HA
	Bridget Archer	Minister for Health, Mental Health and Wellbeing; Minister for Aboriginal Affairs; Minister for Ageing	Bass HA
	Gavin Pearce	Minister for Primary Industries and Water; Minister for Veterans' Affairs	Braddon HA
	Felix Ellis	Minister for Police, Fire and Emergency Management; Minister for Business, Industry and Resources; Minister for Skills and Jobs; Minister for Innovation, Science and Digital Economy	Braddon HA
	Roger Jaensch	Minister for the Arts; Minister for Community and Multicultural Affairs; Minister for Racing; Minister for Tourism, Hospitality and Events	Braddon HA
	Kerry Vincent	Minister for Infrastructure; Minister for Local Government; Minister for Housing and Planning	Prosser LC
	Jo Palmer	Minister for Education; Minister for Children and Youth; Minister for Disability Services; Minister for Women and the Prevention of Family Violence	Rosevears LC
	Nick Duigan	Minister for Energy and Renewables; Minister for Parks; Minister for Sport	WindermereLC
	Rob Fairs	Assistant Minister for Youth Engagement and Sport	Bass HA
Parliamentary offices
	Tania Rattray	Leader of the Government in the Tasmanian Legislative Council	McIntyre LC
Previous members
	Madeleine Ogilvie (2025-26)	Minister for Innovation, Science and Digital Economy; Minister for Environment; Minister for Arts and Heritage; Minister for Community and Multicultural Affairs	Clark HA
	Jane Howlett (2025-26)	Minister for Racing; Minister for Tourism, Hospitality and Events; Minister for Women and the Prevention of Family Violence	Lyons HA

== Tasmanian government agencies ==
The Tasmanian Government delivers services, determines policy, and issues regulations through a number of agencies grouped under areas of portfolio responsibility. Each portfolio is led by a secretary, who reports to one or more government ministers, a member of Parliament. Since reorganisation in 2022 the departmental structure is the following

- Building Tasmania
- Department for Education, Children and Young People
- Department of Health
- Department of Justice
- Department of Police, Fire and Emergency Management
- Department of Premier and Cabinet
- Department of Natural Resources and Environment Tasmania
- Department of Treasury and Finance

A range of other agencies support the functions of these departments.

=== State-owned enterprises ===
The Government of Tasmania also owns and operates a number of state-owned companies:

- Aurora Energy: electricity and gas retailer.
- Sustainable Timber Tasmania: the manager of public forests and plantations for logging, sawmilling and woodchipping.
- Hydro Tasmania: a large generator of electricity, management of hydroelectric schemes. Also owns a mainland Australian energy retailer, Momentum Energy.
- Tasmanian Irrigation: tasked with the planning, construction and maintenance of the Tasmanian Irrigation Schemes culminating pipes, dams and pumping stations.
- Metro Tasmania: a public transportation company, running busses in the metropolitan areas of the state. Metro is under de-facto administration of Building Tasmania.
- Motor Accidents Insurance Board: public insurance resulting from car accidents.
- Port Arthur Historic Site Management Authority: operates the tourism venture at Port Arthur, maintains the ruins of the gaol and historic site.
- Public Trustee: an independent trustee organisation.
- Tascorp: management of the other public companies' finances and government investment.
- TasNetworks: electricity transmission and distribution.
- TasPorts: port management and stevedoring.
- Tasracing: the operator of Tasmania's horse and dog racing venues, management of betting
- TasRail: rail freight transportation, railway management.
- TT-Line Company: operates the Bass Strait ferries.

== Other levels of government ==
=== Federal representation of Tasmania ===
As a state of Australia, Tasmania is represented in the federal House of Representatives and Senate. Tasmania has five representatives in the federal House of Representatives for the electoral divisions of Bass, Braddon, Denison, Franklin and Lyons. In line with other states, Tasmania also has twelve Senators.

Australian House of Representatives
Party	Faction	Representative	Background	Representative since
Labor	Socialist Left	Jess Teesdale	Teacher	3 May 2025
Labor	Socialist Left	Anne Urquhart	Former Senator	3 May 2025
Labor	Socialist Left	Rebecca White	Former state MLA	3 May 2025
Labor	Socialist Left	Julie Collins	Labor staffer	24 November 2007
Independent	N/A	Andrew Wilkie	Army soldier	21 August 2010
Australian Senate
Party	Faction	Senator	Background	Senator since
Liberal	National Right	Wendy Askew	Political adviser	6 March 2019
Liberal	National Right	Claire Chandler	Liberal organiser	1 July 2019
Liberal	National Right	Jonathon Duniam	Liberal staffer	2 July 2016
Liberal	Moderate	Richard Colbeck	Devonport City Council	2002–2016, 9 February 2018
Labor	Socialist Left	Carol Brown	Labor staffer	25 August 2005
Labor	Socialist Left	Josh Dolega	Union official	27 May 2025
Labor	Right	Helen Polley	Labor staffer	1 July 2005
Labor	Right	Richard Dowling	Economist	1 July 2025
Greens	Mainstream	Nick McKim	Former state MLA	19 August 2015
Greens	Mainstream	Peter Whish-Wilson	ADFA	20 June 2012
Lambie	N/A	Jacqui Lambie	Army soldier	2014–2017, 1 July 2019
Independent	N/A	Tammy Tyrrell	Lambie staffer	1 July 2022
Cabinet of Australia
Party	Faction	Minister	Portfolio	Minister since
Labor	Socialist Left	Julie Collins	Agriculture, Fisheries and Forestry	intermittently since 2011

=== Local government in Tasmania ===
29 local government elections are conducted under the Local Government Act using the Hare-Clark voting system of multi-member proportional representation. Elections for mayor, deputy mayor and half the councillor positions are held during September and October in each uneven numbered year. These include six cities (three in greater Hobart, one covering each of Launceston, Burnie, and Devonport) and twenty-three municipalities. The largest council (by number of eligible voters) is the City of Launceston and the smallest council is the Flinders Council (which serves Flinders Island and the surrounds, with just over 800 electors)

== See also ==
- Constitution of Tasmania
- List of Tasmanian government agencies
- Local government in Tasmania
