= Rocky Cape, Tasmania =

Rocky Cape
- Town
- Coordinates: 40°55′03″S 145°34′42″E
- Country: Australia
- State: Tasmania
- Region: North-west and west
- LGA: Circular Head, Waratah-Wynyard
- Location: 30 km (19 mi) NW of Wynyard

Government
  - State electorate: Braddon
  - Federal division: Braddon

Population
  - Total: 206 (2016 census)
- Postcode: 7321
Localities around Rocky Cape
Port Latta	Bass Strait	Rocky Cape National Park
Mawbanna	Rocky Cape	Sisters Beach
Shakespeare Hills Forest Reserve	Dip Range Regional Reserve	Montumana

Rocky Cape is a locality and small rural community in the local government areas of Circular Head and Waratah-Wynyard, in the North-west and west region of Tasmania. It is located about 30 kilometres (19 mi) north-west of the town of Wynyard. The Bass Highway passes through from south-east to north-west. The Rocky Cape National Park is in the north-east of the locality. The 2016 census determined a population of 206 for the state suburb of Rocky Cape.

== History ==
The Detention River flows through the locality, which was previously known as "Detention".

== Road infrastructure ==
The C227 route (Rocky Cape Road) terminates at the Bass Highway in Rocky Cape. It runs north-east to the promontory "Rocky Cape", within the national park.

== See also ==
- Detention River Christian Community
- Banksia Grove (Tasmania)
- Genoplesium brachystachyum (Rocky Cape midge orchid)
