= Protected areas of Tasmania =

Protected areas managed by the Tasmanian Government

Map showing national parks of Tasmania

Protected areas of Tasmania consist of protected areas located within Tasmania and its immediate onshore waters, including Macquarie Island. It includes areas of crown land (withheld land) managed by Tasmanian Government agencies as well as private reserves. As of 2016, 52% of Tasmania's land area has some form of reservation classification, the majority is managed by the Tasmania Parks and Wildlife Service (about 42% of total Tasmanian land area). Marine protected areas cover about 7.9% of state waters.

Within each classification of reserve there may be a variation of IUCN categories Australia is a signatory to the Convention of Biological Diversity and as such has obligations to report the status of its National Reserve System.IUCN provides on its website a prescription for activities consistent with the categorisation system. Changes made to the Nature Conservation Act 2002 in 2014 permit timber harvesting. These changes made in addition to the already established right to access minerals means that many of the IUCN categorisations assigned to individual reserves in Tasmania are no longer fit for purpose. In addition many reserves have had their reserve status downgraded from a class excluding timber harvesting and mineral extraction to ones where these activities are now permitted. This mis-application of the IUCN protected area categories needs to be remedied or the reserves protected land class under the Nature Conservation Act 2002 should be adjusted to reflect its currently assigned IUCN category.

== Legislation and management ==
- Tasmania Parks and Wildlife Service manages crown land reserved under the Nature Conservation Act 2002. The 10 classes of protected land are: conservation area, historic site, game reserve, national park, nature recreation area, nature reserve, regional reserve and state reserve. The National Parks and Reserves Management act 2002 determines the management objectives for each class.
- 'Permanent timber production zone land' is crown land managed by Sustainable Timber Tasmania under the Forest Management Act 2013. It contains areas of informal reserves (e.g. landscape connectivity, streamside buffers, etc.)
- The Department of Primary Industries, Parks, Water and Environment (DPIPWE) administers "future potential production forest" crown land (formerly "future reserve land") as defined in The Forestry (Rebuilding the Forest Industry) Act 2014.
- The Wellington Park Management Trust is outlined in the Wellington Park Act 1993.

== Summary of area totals ==
At 30 June 2016, Tasmania's terrestrial reserves cover 3.4 million hectares (8.4×10^{6} acres) (about 50.1% of the area of Tasmania), of which Tasmania Parks and Wildlife Service manages 823 reserves (about 2.9 million ha (7.2 million acres), or over 42% of the area of Tasmania).

The following table demonstrates the distribution of terrestrial protected areas as of June 2016, any marine areas are excluded. All protected areas not managed by Tasmania Parks and Wildlife Service or Sustainable Timber Tasmania is grouped into "other", including: formal and informal reserves on public land, reserves on private land, and Wellington Park.

Operator	Class or category	Number	Total area* (ha)	Percentage of all reserved area
TPWS	Conservation area	438	622,000	18.2%
TPWS	Game reserve	12	13,000	0.4%
TPWS	Historic site	30	9,000	0.3%
TPWS	National park	19	1,463,000	42.9%
TPWS	Nature recreation area	25	67,000	2.0%
TPWS	Nature reserves	86	35,000	1.0%
TPWS	Regional reserves	148	454,000	13.3%
TPWS	State reserves	65	46,000	1.4%
TPWS	Total managed by TPWS	823	2,709,000	79.3%
STT	Informal reserve	—N/a	121,000	3.6%
DPIPWE	Future potential production forest	—N/a	392,000	11.5%
Other	Other not managed by TPWS or STT	—N/a	192,000	5.6%
—N/a	Total of all Tasmanian reserved area	—N/a	3,415,000	100%
*rounding to nearest 1,000 hectares Department of Primary Industries, Water and Environment is denoted by DPIPWE, Sustainable Timber Tasmania by STT and Tasmania Parks and Wildlife Service by TPWS

== Marine ==
=== Commonwealth marine reserves ===
There are several Commonwealth marine reserves in the vicinity of Tasmania, these reserves are not within state waters and are managed by the Australian government. All of the reserves are part of the South-east Commonwealth Marine Reserve Network which contains an additional 4 reserves.

- Beagle
- Boags
- Flinders
- Franklin
- Freycinet
- Huon
- Macquarie Island
- South Tasman Rise
- Tasman Fracture
- Zeehan

=== Tasmanian marine protected areas ===
Marine protected areas (MPAs) in Tasmanian state waters are classed as either conservation area, national park or nature reserve. Only the nature reserve or national park class have either restricted fishing or no take zones. Of the approximately 135,000 hectares (330,000 acres) of marine protected areas, about 48,000 hectares (120,000 acres) is restricted fishing or no take, Macquarie Island (~75,000 ha (190,000 acres)) is a wholly no-take zone.

In total 7.9% of Tasmania's State coastal waters is reserved, however only 4.2% is in no-take areas and the majority of this is concentrated around subantarctic Macquarie Island. Only 1.1% of Tasmania's immediate coastal waters are fully protected in no-take areas.

== Private reserves ==
Reserves on private land is about 4% of the terrestrial protected areas in Tasmania.

=== Conservation Covenant ===
Landowners may protect some areas of their land by entering into a Conservation Covenant which is legally binding under the Nature Conservation Act (2002) and is registered on the land title. Although usually in perpetuity, about 7% of the covenant area in Tasmania is fixed-term. In December 2016, there were 819 covenants covering an area of about 99,000 ha (240,000 acres).

=== Indigenous Protected Areas ===
There are 8 Indigenous Protected Area in Tasmania, covering an area of about 11,000 ha (27,000 acres).

IUCN V

- Babel Island
- Badger Island
- Great Dog Island
- lungatalanana
- Mt Chappell Island
- Putalina
- Risdon Cove

IUCN VI

- Preminghana

=== Private sanctuaries ===
Land reserved for the significant natural or cultural values while permitting the carrying out of agricultural or other activities consistent on preserving the values of the land.

== Wellington Park ==
Wellington Park is the protected area which encompasses Mount Wellington and surrounds near Hobart. It is IUCN protected area category II and covers an area of about 18,000 ha (44,000 acres). It is managed by the Wellington Park Management Trust established in 1993 whose members include: Hobart and Glenorchy City Councils, Tasmania Parks and Wildlife Service, DPIPWE, TasWater and Tourism Tasmania.

== State forest ==
=== Future potential production forest ===
'Future potential production forest land' (FPPF or FPPFL) is crown land administered by the Department of Primary Industries, Parks, Water and Environment (DPIPWE) where, except in some circumstances for "special species timbers", no native forest harvesting can be undertaken. It was formally classified as "future reserve land" (FRL) under the Tasmanian Forests Agreement. FPPF may be converted to "permanent timber production zone land" (PTPZ or PTPZL) after 2020.

==== Background ====
The Tasmanian Forests Agreement which was passed in 2013 after almost 4 years of negotiations, categorised about 400,000 hectares (990,000 acres) of crown land native forest as FRL, which included areas of forests of the Styx, Weld, Upper Florentine, Great Western Tiers and Tarkine regions. The fate of FRL was dependent upon Tasmanian forest practices gaining Forest Stewardship Council (FSC) certification. In the recent 2014 audit, Forestry Tasmania (now Sustainable Timber Tasmania) complied with 193 indicators, but needed further action on 10 more.

In September 2014 the Tasmanian government passed legislation which reclassified the 400,000 hectares of FRL as FPPF. After the expiration of the memorandum in April 2020, areas of FPPF can be converted to PTPZ where native forest logging can occur, subject to parliamentary approval. Until 2020, only limited "special species timber" harvesting can be undertaken in FPPF.

=== Permanent timber production zone land ===
Sustainable Timber Tasmania is a government business enterprise owned by the Tasmanian Government which manages and operates state forest on crown land (officially classified as "permanent timber production zone land"). Some of this land has informal protection and is managed for conservation as part of the Tasmanian CAR reserve system (e.g. habitat for threatened species, streamside protection, landscape connectivity). Informal reserves on the public production forest land cover about 121,000 ha (300,000 acres).

==== Forest reserves ====
Forest reserves are located on "permanent timber production zone land" and may have recreation or other tourism facilities.

- Brookerana
- Dalgarth
- Griffin
- Hollybank
- Jean Brook
- Lawrence Rivulet
- Oldina
- Springfield
- Tahune
- Upper Natone
- Wes Beckett

== Conservation areas ==
A protected area of land predominantly in a natural state. The sustainable use of natural resources may be permitted, such as mining, special species timber harvesting or hunting. There are 438 conservation areas covering a terrestrial area of about 622,000 ha (1,540,000 acres). Mostly IUCN protected area categories IV, V or VI.

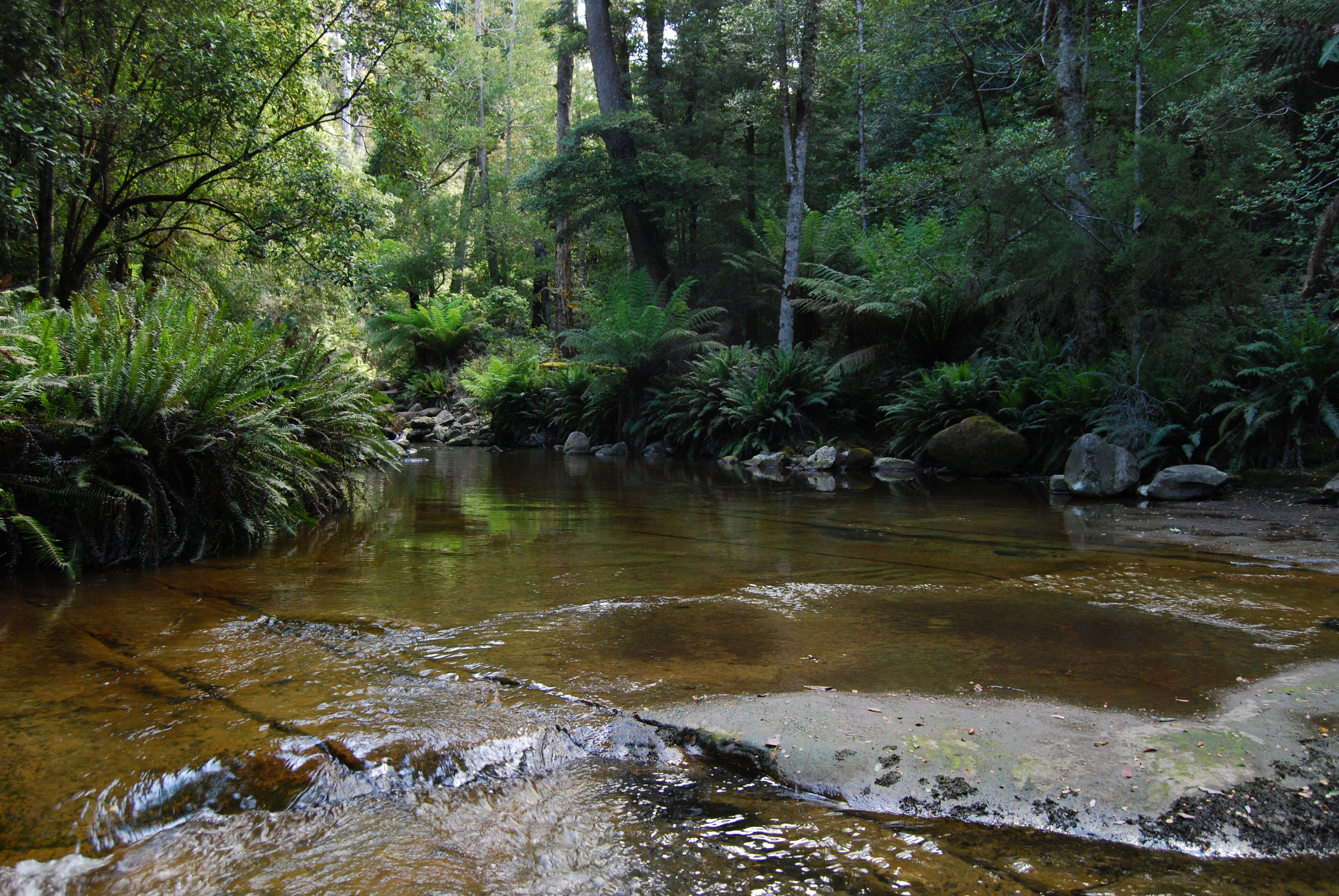
Rainforest in the Liffey Falls Conservation Area

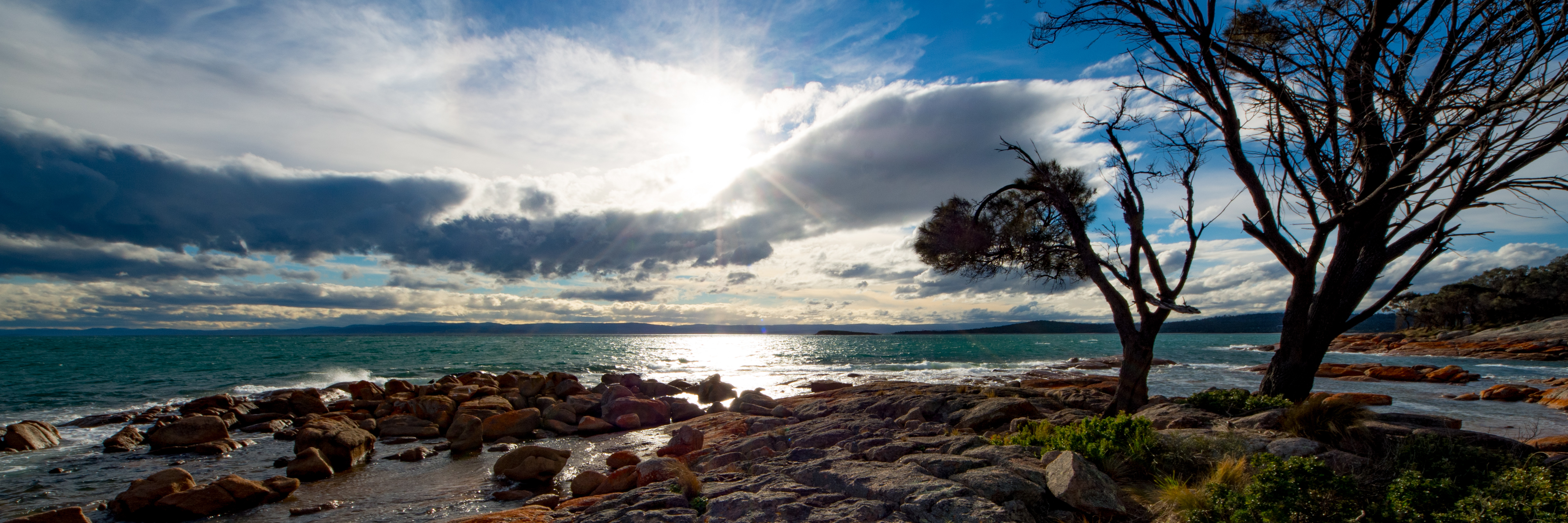
Looking towards Great Oyster Bay, Coles Bay Conservation Area

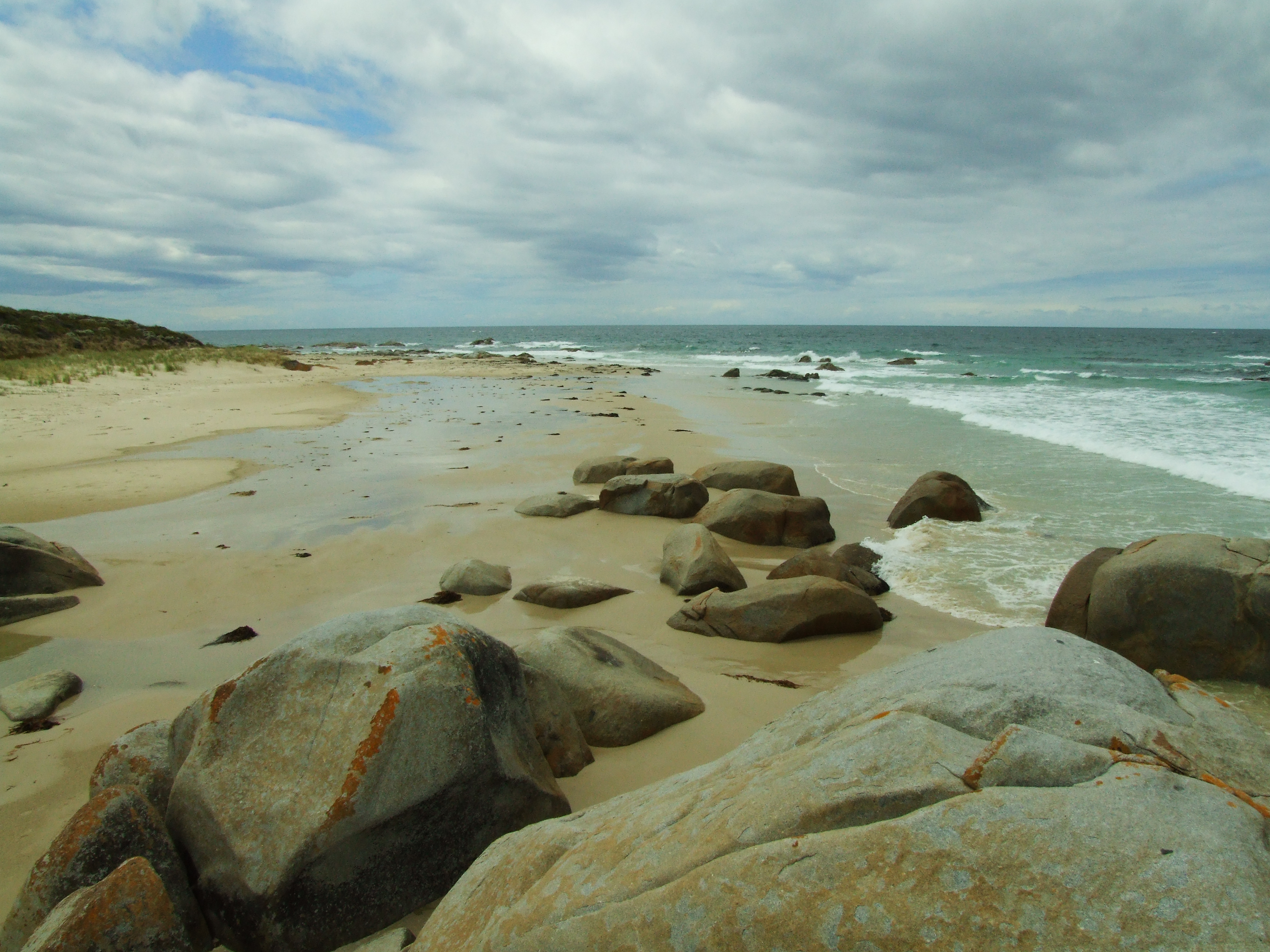
Conservation Area at St Helens

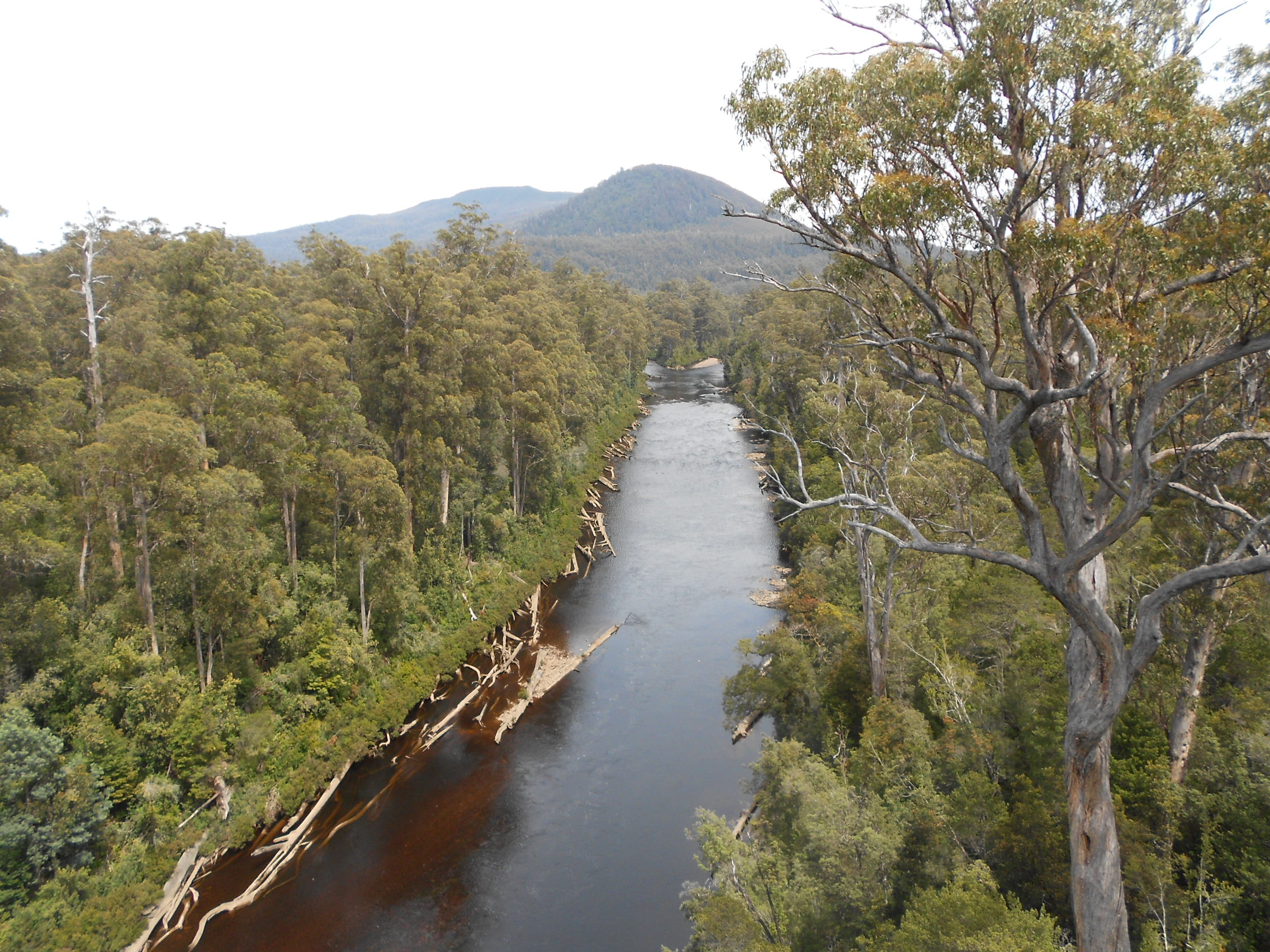
Junction of Huon and Picton Rivers near Picton River Conservation Area

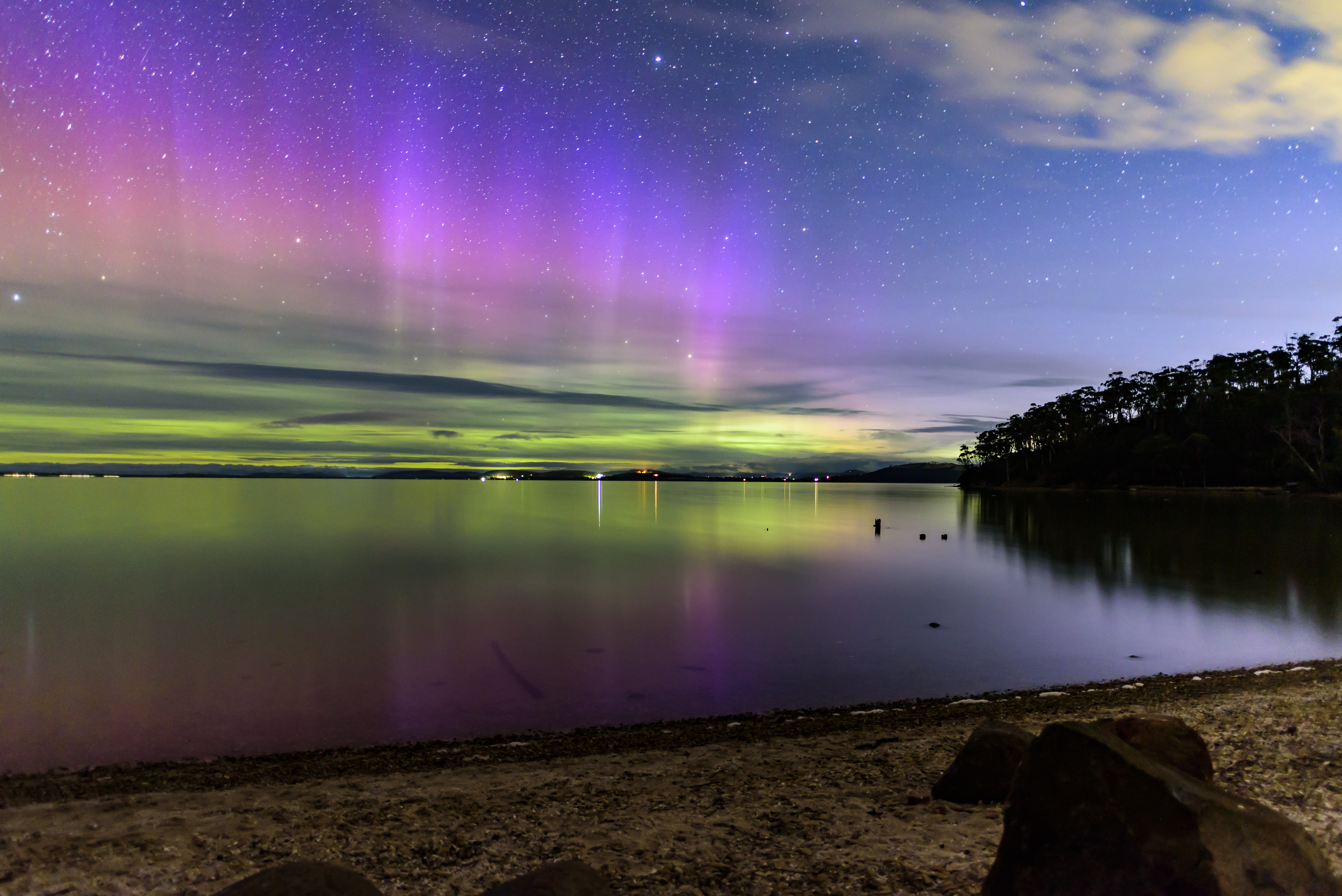
Mortimer Bay near South Arm Marine Conservation Area

=== IUCN Ia or Ib ===
- Picton River
- Unnamed (Sun Ridge)

=== IUCN II ===
- Boyd
- Drys Bluff
- Liffey
- Meander
- Unnamed (Gillam Creek Road)
- Unnamed (Gunns Plains)
- Unnamed (Mayberry CA)

=== IUCN III ===
- Big Tree
- Emu River
- Fossil Cove
- Gunns Plains
- Meetus Falls
- Roger River Road
- Styx Tall Trees
- Unnamed (Sassafras Creek)

=== IUCN IV ===
- Alma Tier
- Arve Loop
- Big Sassy Creek
- Bligh Point
- Bluff River
- Boggy Creek
- Boot Bay
- Brother and Sister
- Brown Mountain
- Brushy Rivulet
- Buxton River
- Christmas Hills
- Cleveland Lagoon
- Coal Point
- Coxs Hill
- Deep Lagoons
- Den Hill
- Denison Ridge
- Dismal Range
- Duck River East
- Eastern Tiers
- Exe Rivulet
- Fisher Tier
- Flowerdale River
- Franklin Rivulet
- Gentle Annie
- Jackeys Creek
- Kenmere Creek
- Lake Binney
- Lake Mikany
- Lanes Tier
- Long Hill
- Lost Falls
- MacLaines Creek
- Marion Beach
- Mersey River
- Midday Hill
- Middle Arm
- Millers Bluff
- Montagu Island
- Mount Bruny
- Mount Dromedary
- Mount Hicks Road
- Mount Mangana
- Mount Midway
- Mount Morrison
- Mount Ponsonby
- Mount Thunderbolt
- Narrawa Road
- North Styx
- Ouse River
- Pelican Island
- Plains Creek
- Quamby Bluff
- Rebecca Creek
- Red Reef
- Reedy Marsh
- Remarkable Rock
- Rimons Hill
- River Hill
- Royal George
- Sand River
- Sandspit River
- Shannon River
- Shingle Hill
- Sisters Island
- Snake Bay
- Snaky Creek
- Table Mountain Shore
- Tanina Bluff
- Tarraleah
- Tippogoree Hills
- Tooms Lake
- Tungatinah
- Virginstow
- Warrawee
- Wayatinah
- Wentworth Creek
- Whalers Lookout
- Wild Bee
- Wyre Forest Creek
- Yellow Bluff Creek
- Unnamed (Badger Head Road)
- Unnamed (Clerkes Hill)

=== IUCN V ===
- Alpha Pinnacle
- Anderson Islands
- Apex Point
- Arthur River
- Badger Spur
- Battery Island
- Bellettes Bay
- Big Bay
- Black River
- Black River Bridge
- Black River South
- Blyth Point
- Boxen Island
- Bridgenorth
- Bull Rock
- Bun Beetons Point
- Burnett Point
- Calder River
- Calverts Lagoon
- Cam River
- Cam River South
- Cape de la Sortie
- Cape Portland
- Carr Villa
- Cataraqui Point
- Champion Park
- Chasm Creek
- Cheeseberry Hill
- Chronicle Point
- City of Melbourne Bay
- Clarence River
- Clifton Beach
- Cone Islet
- Craggy Island
- Crooked Billet Bay
- Doctors Rocks
- Don Heads
- Doughboy Island
- Duck River
- Eaglehawk Bay-Flinders Bay
- East Cam River
- East Moncoeur Island
- Edgcumbe Beach
- Egg Beach
- Eldorado
- Elizabeth River
- Esperance Point
- Esperance River
- Fannys Bay
- Fingal Rivulet
- Five Mile Pinnacles
- Fletchers Hill West
- Forth Falls Creek
- Forwards Beach
- Fotheringate Bay
- Four Mile Creek
- Good Marsh
- Granite Point
- Great Lake
- Great Musselroe River
- Greens Beach
- Griggs Creek
- Harbour Islets
- Harcus Island
- Harry Walker Tier
- Hastings Bay
- Henderson Islets
- Holts Point
- Hunter Island
- Jones Rivulet
- Kangaroo Island
- Lackrana
- Lake Dulverton
- Lake River
- Lighthouse Point
- Little Island
- Little Pine Lagoon
- Little Swanport
- Little Trefoil
- Long Bay
- Long Reach
- Macquarie River
- Marriott Reef
- Marshall Beach
- McDonalds Point
- Middle Island
- Montagu Beach
- Morass Bay
- Mount Wedge
- Murkay Islets
- Nares Rocks
- Neds Reef
- Ninth Island
- Norfolk Bay
- North George River
- North Passage Point
- North West Bay
- North West Head
- North-East Park
- Ocean Beach
- Outer North Head
- Pasco Group
- Peter Murrell
- Plenty River
- Point Bailly
- Point du Ressac
- Port Cygnet
- Port Sorell
- Prosser River
- Punchbowl
- Ralphs Bay
- Ram Island
- Red Hut Point
- River Tyne
- Rocky Point
- Roydon Island
- Running Ground Ridge
- Salem Bay
- Sassafras Gully
- Seacrow Islet
- Seagull Islet
- Sentinel Island
- Settlement Point
- Sheepwash Bay
- Shell Islets
- Sidmouth
- Simpsons Bay
- Sloping Main
- South Pats River
- Spike Island
- Split Rock Saddle
- Stokes Point
- Stringybark
- Sugarloaf Rock
- Tailers Bay
- Tamar
- Tea-Tree Bay
- Trousers Point Beach
- Truganini
- Tully River
- Tyenna River
- Vansittart Island
- Wallaby Islands
- Wayatinah Lagoon
- Wellwood Creek
- West Arm
- White Beach
- Youngs Creek
- Unnamed (Badger Corner)
- Unnamed (Duck Bay)
- Unnamed (Goulds Lagoon)
- Unnamed (Kingston Golf Course)
- Unnamed (Lake Leake)
- Unnamed (Mersey Hill Karst)
- Unnamed (Mersey River)
- Unnamed (Pipers River)
- Unnamed (Sanspit River)
- Unnamed (The Lea)
- Unnamed (Wet Cave)
- Unnamed South Esk

=== IUCN VI ===
- Adamsfield
- Ansons Bay
- Ansons River
- Apsley
- Arthur Bay
- Arthur-Pieman
- Bay of Fires
- Bernafai Ridge
- Blythe River
- Boltons Beach
- Boobyalla
- Boobyalla River
- Bouchers Creek
- Brick Islands
- Brid River
- Briggs Islet
- Brookerana
- Brougham Sugarloaf
- Cat Island
- Catamaran River
- Central Plateau
- Chalky Island
- Chauncy Vale
- Chuckle Head
- Coles Bay
- Colliers Swamp
- Coswell Beach
- Counsel Hill
- Cressy Beach
- Crotty
- Dans Hill
- Darling Range
- Dasher River
- Denison Rivulet
- Detention Falls
- Devils Den
- Double Sandy Point
- Egg Islands
- Five Mile Bluff
- Foochow
- Forsyth Island
- Fossil Bluff
- George Town
- Goose Island
- Gordons Ridge
- Granite Tor
- Gravelly Ridge
- Great Western Tiers
- Gull Island
- Heazlewood Hill
- Hogan Group
- Howie Island
- Jacksons Cove
- Judbury
- Kelvedon Beach
- Lagoons Beach
- Lake Beatrice
- Lees Point
- Liawenee
- Lillico Beach
- Lime Pit Road
- Limekiln Creek
- Little Beach
- Little Boobyalla River
- Little Chalky Island
- Little Green Island
- Little Quoin
- Logan Lagoon
- Long Island
- Long Tom
- Low Point
- Marks Point
- Mayfield Bay
- Medeas Cove
- Mile Island
- Millingtons Beach
- Molesworth
- Moss Gully
- Mount Bethune
- Mount Faulkner
- Mount Royal
- Mount Rumney
- Mountain Creek
- Mulligans Hill
- Murphys Flat
- Musselroe Bay
- Night Island
- Oyster Rocks
- Pardoe Northdown
- Parnella
- Passage Island
- Patriarchs
- Peggs Beach
- Perkins Island
- Porky Beach
- Prime Seal Island
- Princess River
- Rainbow Point
- Randalls Bay
- Raspins Beach
- Redbill Point
- Reef Island
- Roaring Beach
- Russell Ridge
- Sea Elephant
- Sensation Gorge
- Seymour
- Shag Lagoon
- Sherwood Hill
- Single Tree Plain
- Sister Islands
- Slaves Bay
- South Arm
- South Esk River
- Southport Lagoon
- Spiky Beach
- Spinning Gum
- St Clair Lagoon
- St Helens
- Stanley
- Storehouse Island
- Strickland
- Summer Camp
- Surveyors Bay
- Swansea
- Swift Creek
- Table Mountain
- Tathams Lagoon
- Tatlows Beach
- The Dutchman
- Tiger Rise
- Top Marshes
- Tunbridge Tier
- Upper Blythe
- Vale of Belvoir
- Waddles Creek
- Waterhouse
- Waterhouse Island
- Wedge Island
- West Inlet
- White Kangaroo
- Wielangta
- Woodbridge Hill
- Wright and Egg Islands
- Wybalenna Island
- Yarlington
- Unnamed (Fern Glade)
- Unnamed (Long Marsh)
- Unnamed (Pipers Brook)
- Unnamed (Tooms Lake)

=== Marine conservation areas ===
Conservation areas that are marine protected areas cover about 12,000 ha (30,000 acres) of state waters, and are all IUCN protected area category VI. Marine conservation areas do not have any fishing restrictions.

- Blackman Rivulet
- Central Channel
- Cloudy Bay Lagoon
- Hippolyte Rocks
- Huon Estuary
- Monk Bay
- Opossum Bay
- Port Cygnet
- River Derwent
- Roberts Point
- Simpsons Point
- Sloping Island
- South Arm
- Waterfall-Fortescue

== Game reserves ==
An area of land conserved for containing natural values that are unique, important or have representative value; particularly games species and allowing the sustainable hunting these species. There are 12 game reserves covering an area of about 20,000 ha (49,000 acres), all are IUCN protected area category VI.

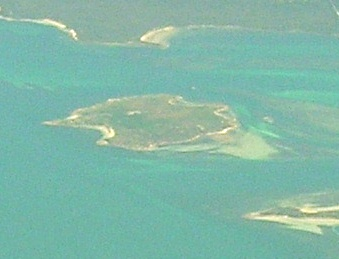
Little Dog Island

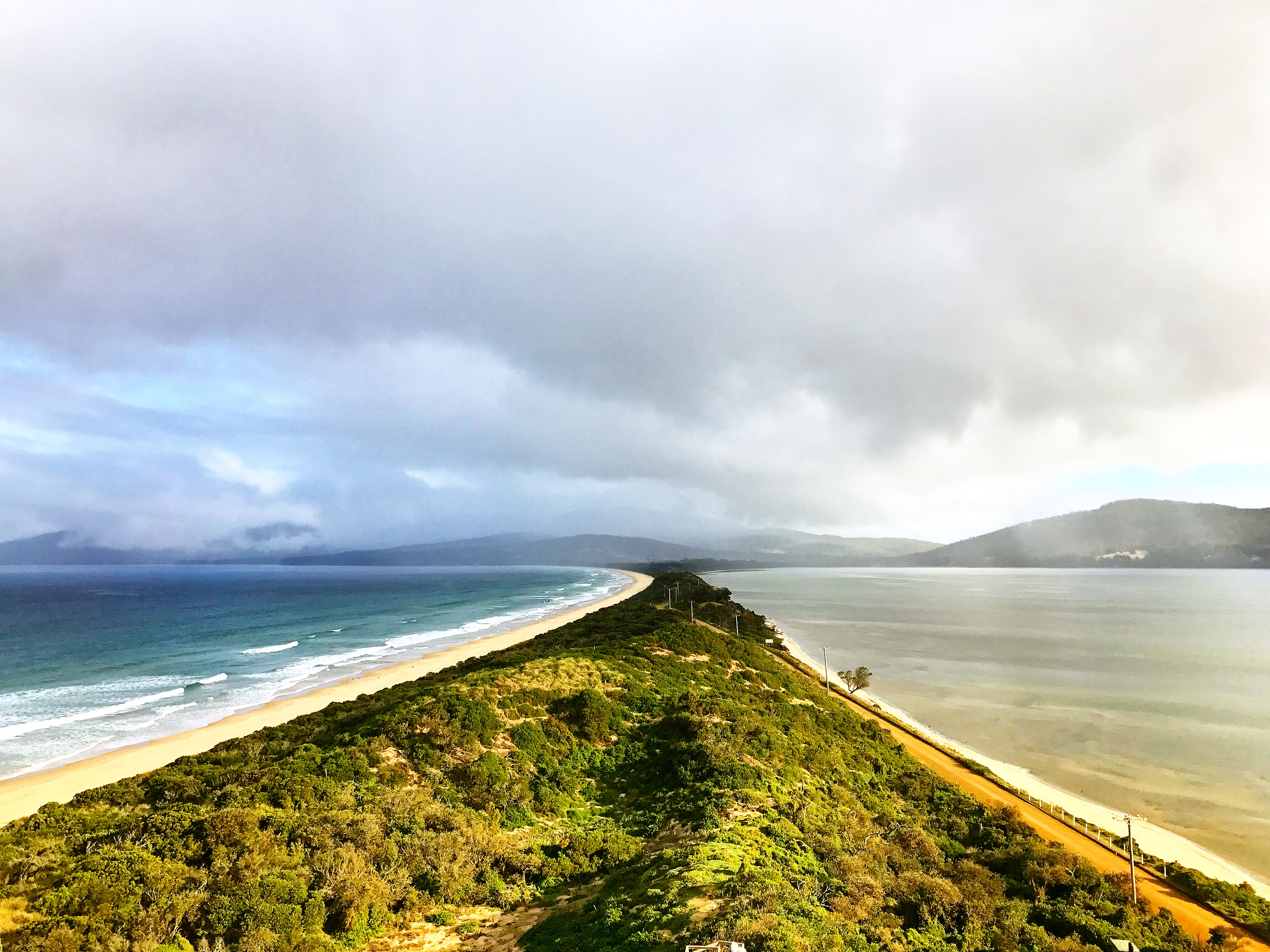
Bruny Island Neck
- Actaeon Island
- Bird Island
- Bruny Island Neck
- Farm Cove
- Lake Tiberias
- Little Dog Island
- Moulting Lagoon
- New Year Island
- North East River
- Petrel Islands
- Sellars Lagoon
- Stack Island

== Historic sites ==
Land with significant historic cultural heritage and is conserved for presentation of these features for public appreciation and education. There are 30 historic sites covering an area of about 16,000 ha (40,000 acres). Most are IUCN protected area category V.

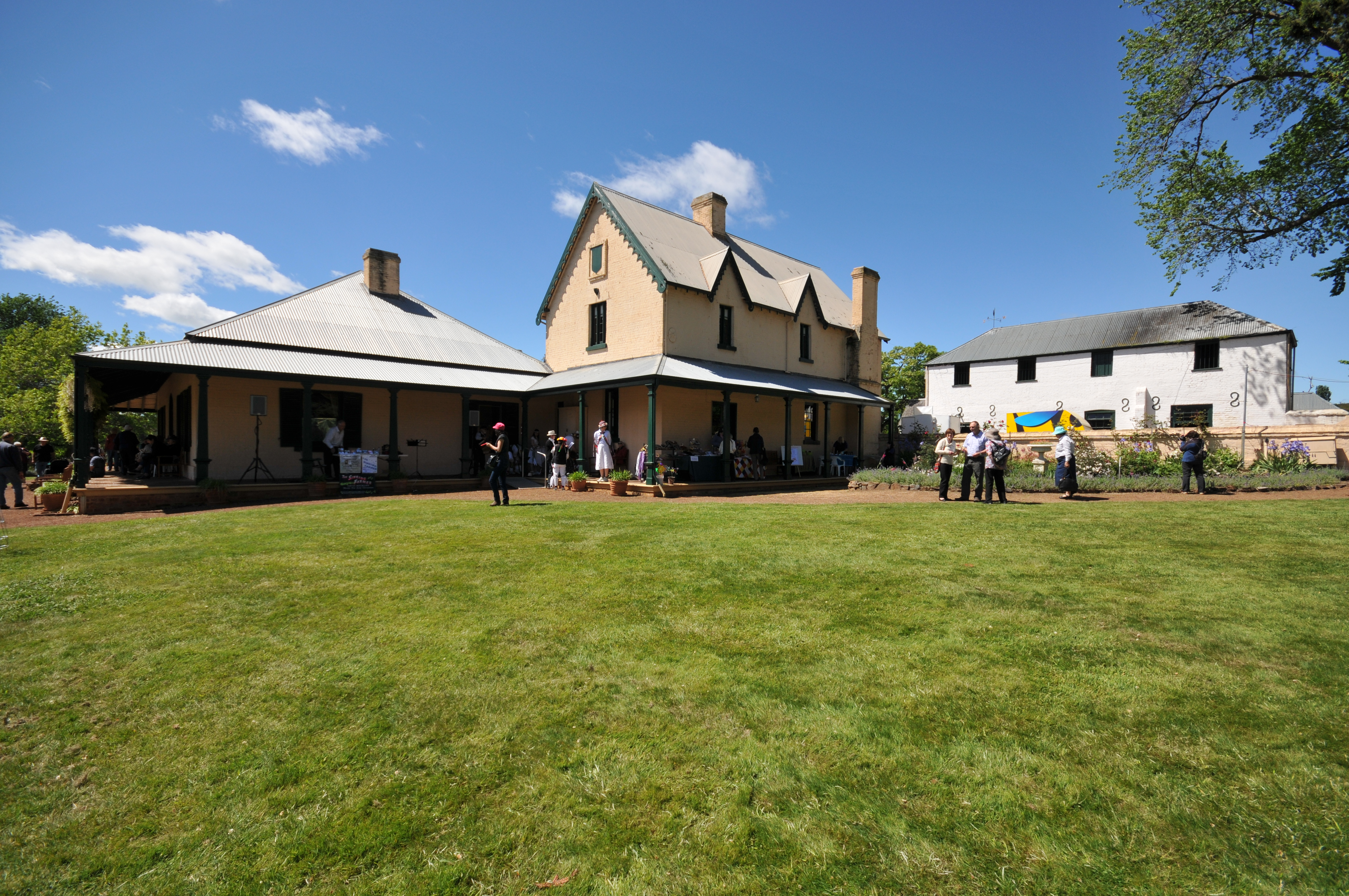
Entally House, Hadspen

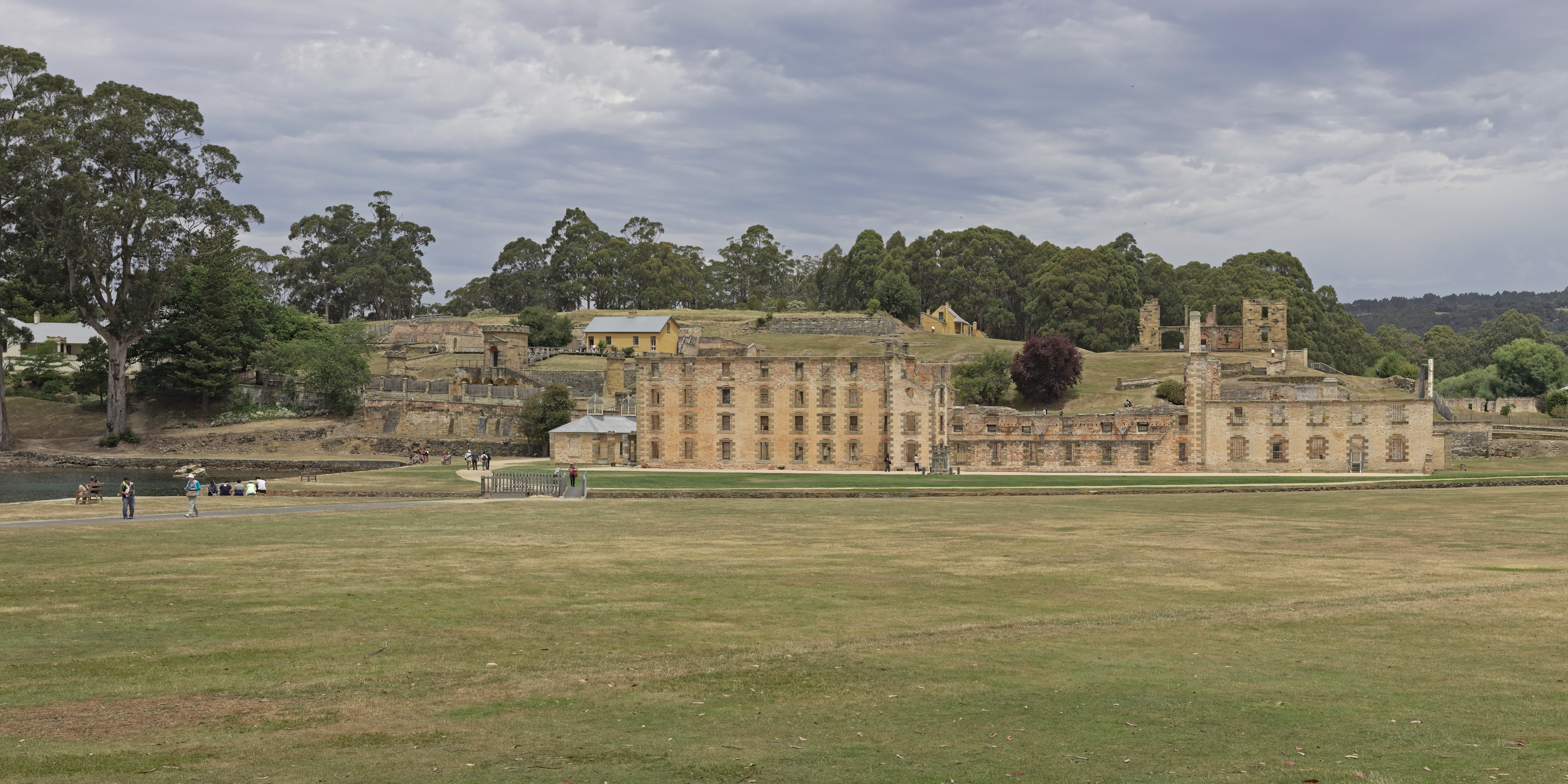
Port Arthur Historic Site

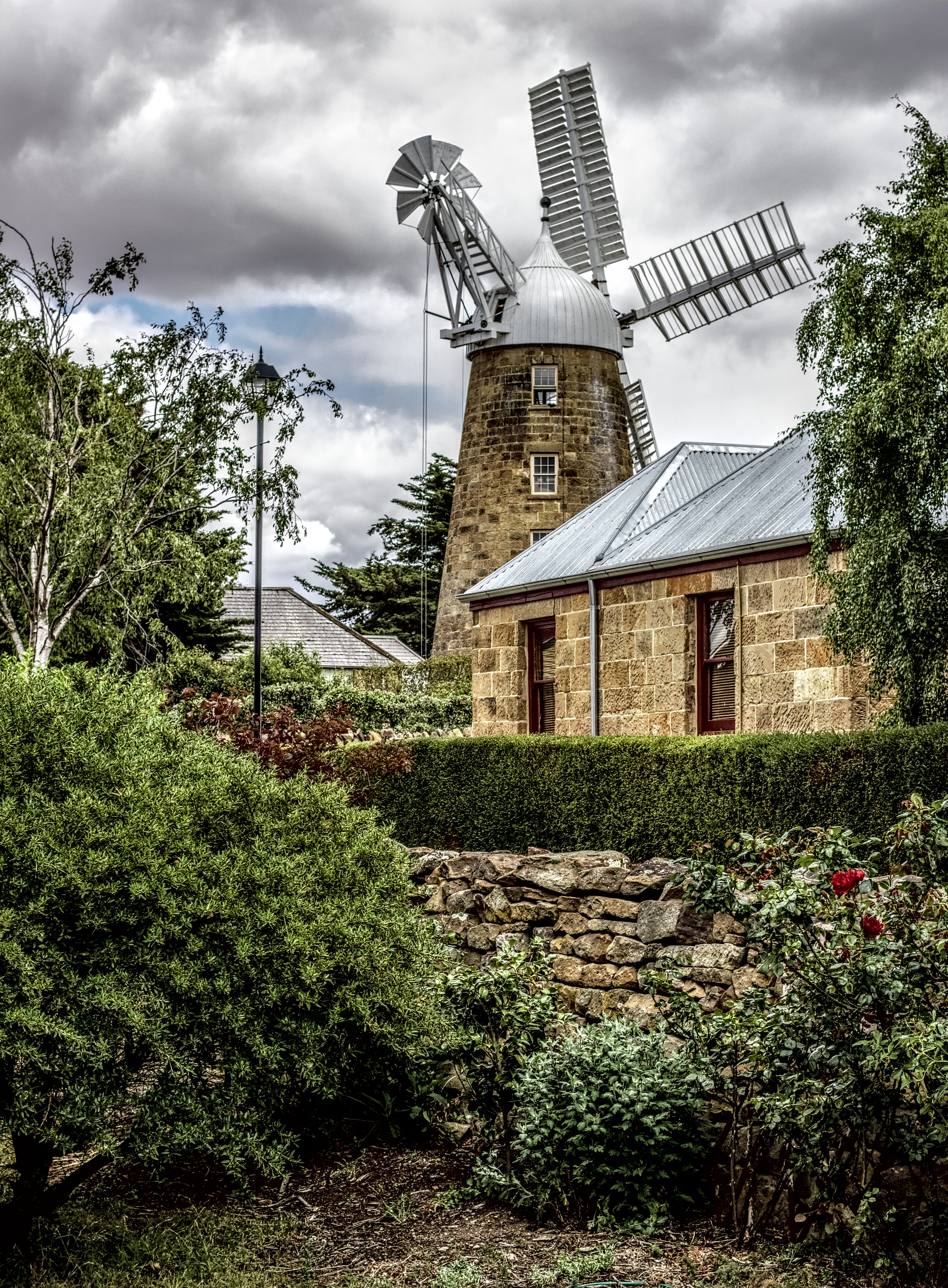
Callington Mill, Oatlands

IUCN II

- Macquarie Harbour

IUCN IV

- Cemetery Point
- Premaydena Point

IUCN V

- Batchelors Grave
- Callington Mill
- Cape Sorell
- Cascades Female Factory
- Coal Mines
- Currie Lightkeepers Residence
- D'Entrecasteaux Monument
- D'Entrecasteaux Watering Place
- Eaglehawk Neck
- Eddystone Point Lighthouse
- Entally House
- George III Monument
- Highfield
- Kangaroo Bluff
- Low Head
- Lyons Cottage
- Mount Direction
- Port Arthur
- Richmond Gaol
- Ross Female Convict Station
- Shot Tower
- Strahan Customs House
- Sydney Cove
- Tasman Monument
- Toll House
- Waubadebars Grave
- Yorktown

== National parks ==
A national park in Tasmania is defined as a large natural area of land containing a representative or outstanding sample of major natural regions, features or scenery. National parks serve to protect and maintain the natural and cultural values of the area of land while providing for ecologically sustainable recreation. There are 19 national parks covering a terrestrial area of about 1,468,000 ha (3,630,000 acres), the largest protected area category in Tasmania.

IUCN Ia or Ib

- Maria Island
- Cradle Mountain-Lake St Clair
- Franklin-Gordon Wild Rivers
- Savage River
- Southwest
- Walls of Jerusalem

IUCN II

- Ben Lomond
- Douglas-Apsley
- Freycinet
- Hartz Mountains
- Kent Group
- Mole Creek Karst
- Mount Field
- Mount William
- Narawntapu
- Rocky Cape
- South Bruny
- Strzelecki
- Tasman

=== National parks (marine) ===
Three national parks also have a marine protected area component. These cover about 48,000 ha (120,000 acres) of state waters.

- Kent Group (forms part of Kent Group National Park)
- Maria Island (forms part of Maria Island National Park)
- Port Davey/Bathurst (forms part of Southwest National Park)

== Nature recreation areas ==
Is predominantly in a natural state or contains sensitive natural sites of significance for recreation. Reserved for public recreation and education consistent with conserving the values of the area. There are 25 nature recreation areas covering an area of about 67,000 ha (170,000 acres), mostly IUCN protected area category V.

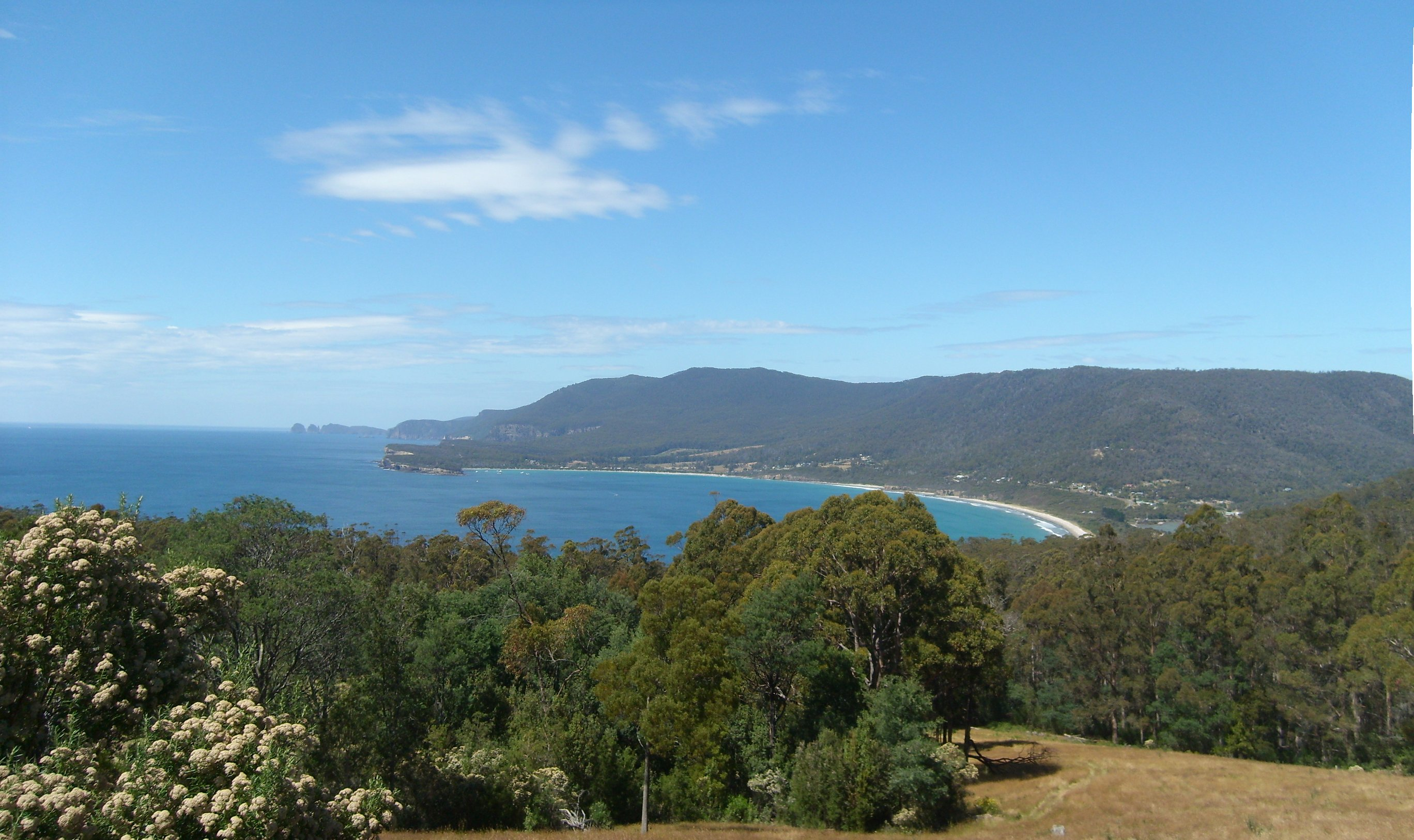
Pirates Bay

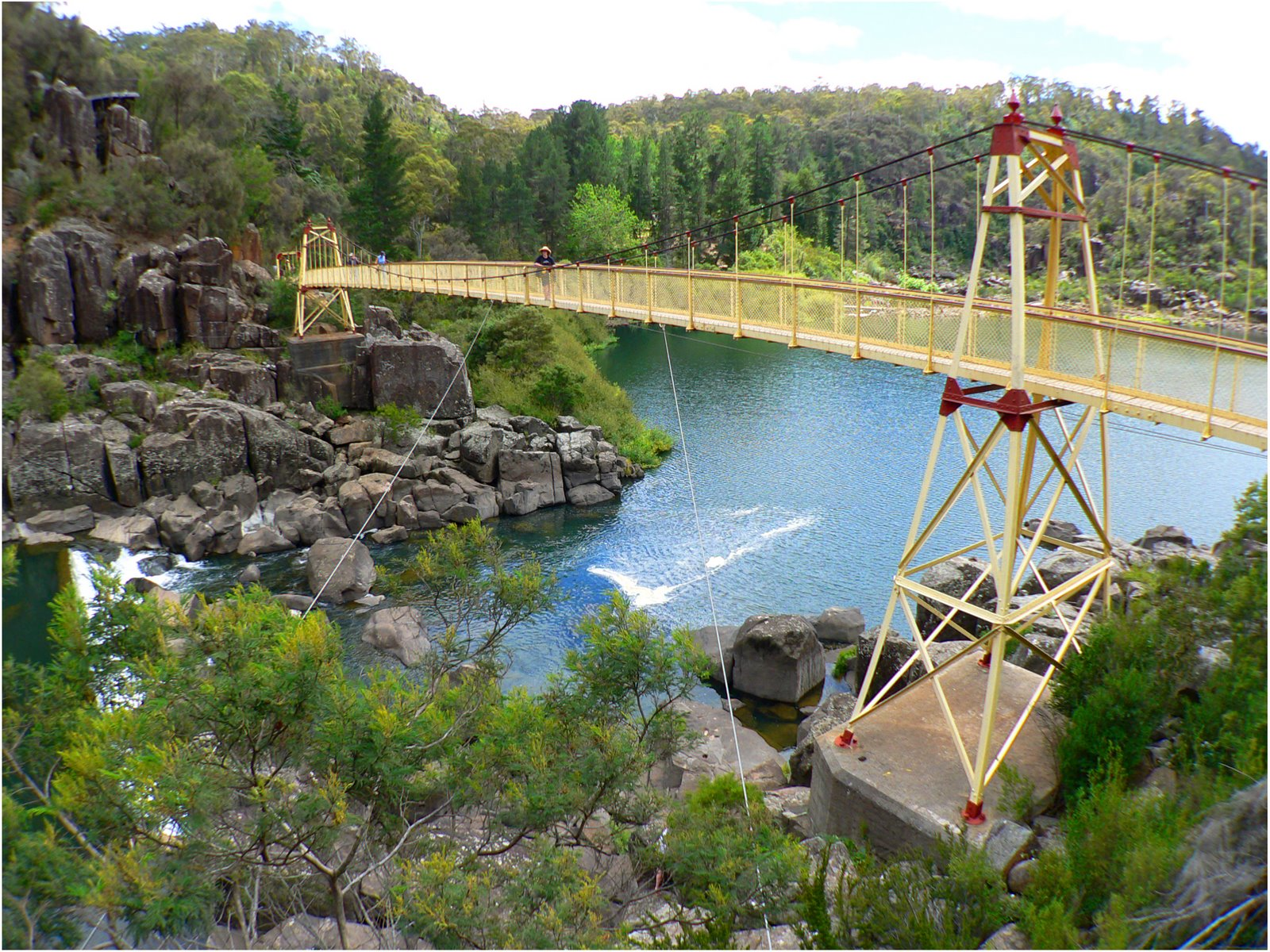
Alexandra Bridge near Trevallyn Nature Recreation Area

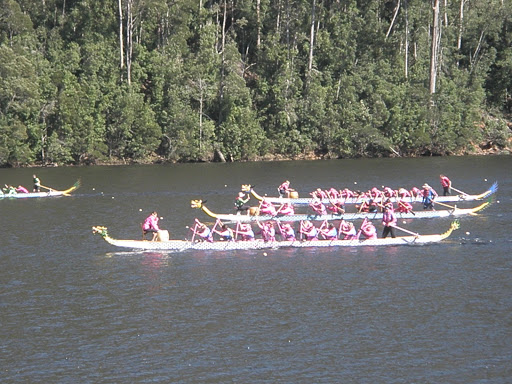
Lake Barrington near Devonport

IUCN III

- Pirates Bay
- Trevallyn

IUCN V

- Black Bluff
- Briant Hill
- Coningham
- Donaldson River
- Gellibrand Point
- Gordons Hill
- Hope Island
- Humbug Point
- Kate Reed
- Knopwood Hill
- Lake Barrington
- Meehan Range
- Mount Dial
- Palana Beach
- Recherche Bay
- Reynolds Falls
- Rosny Hill
- Snug Tiers

IUCN VI

- Emita
- Killiecrankie
- Mount Tanner

== Nature reserves ==
An area of land that is conserved for the natural values that contribute to the natural biological or geological diversity of the area and are unique, important or have representative value. There are 86 nature reserves covering a terrestrial area of about 36,000 ha (89,000 acres). Mostly IUCN protected area category Ia.

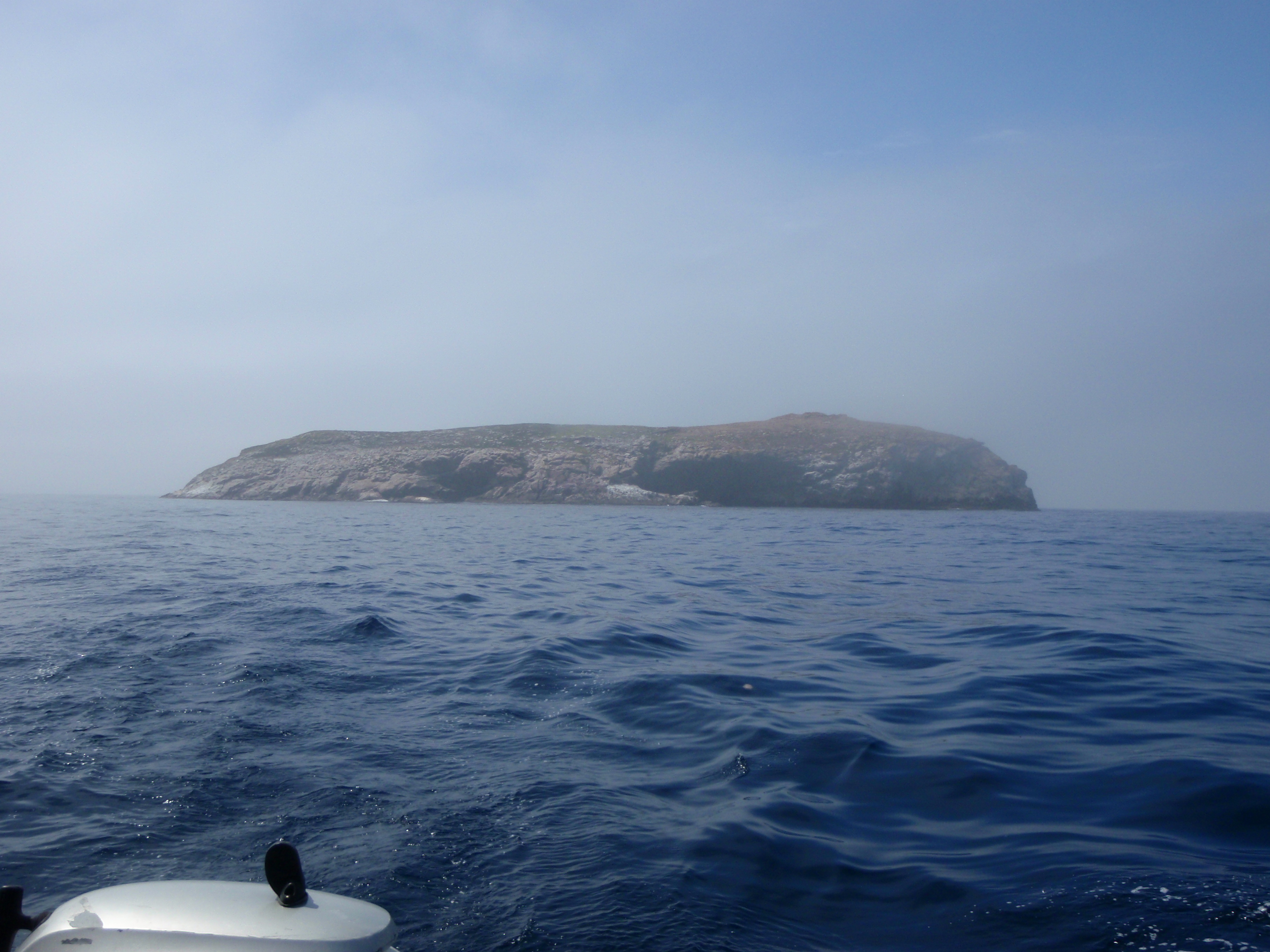
Ile des Phoques from the south

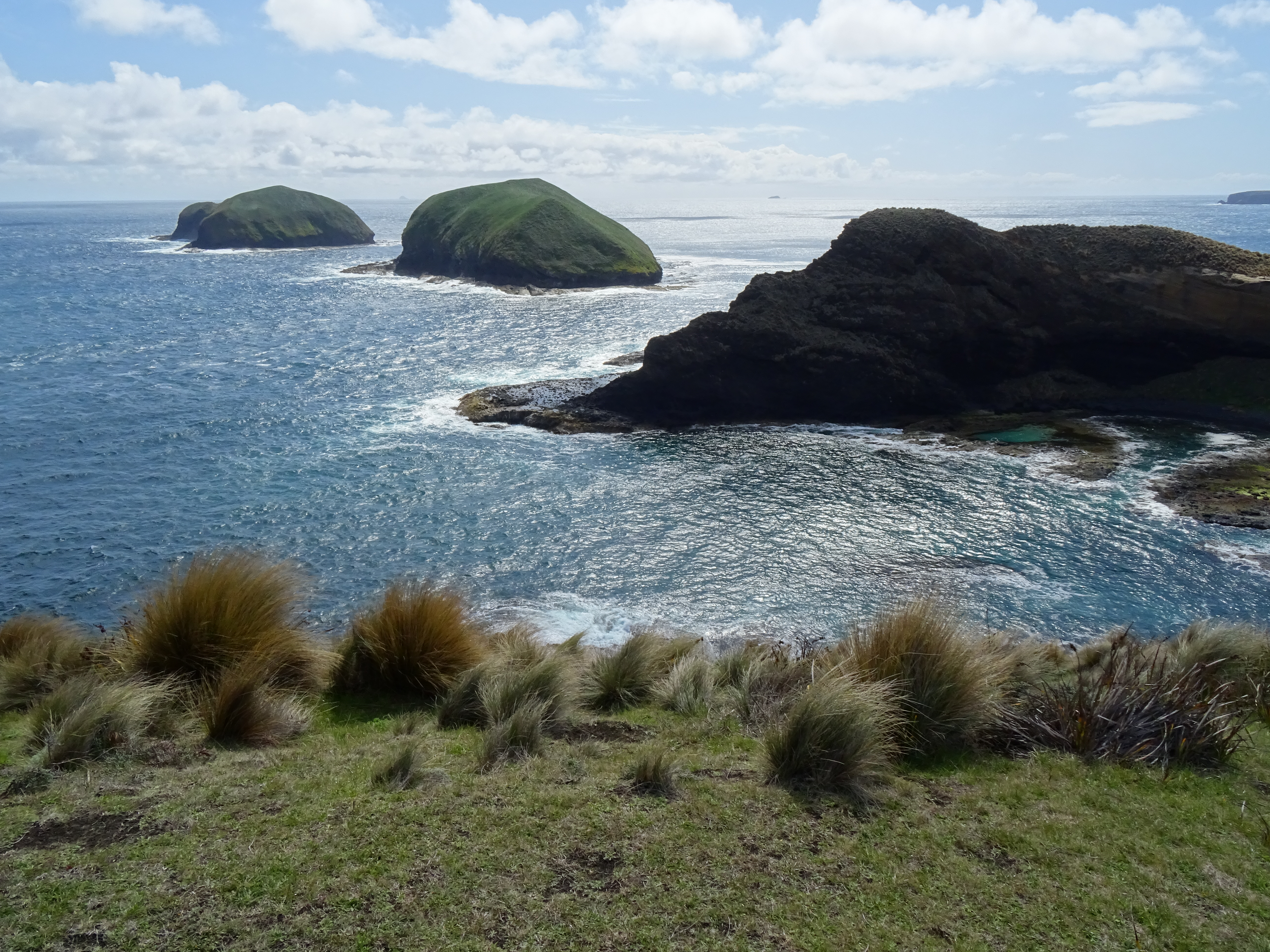
The Doughboys

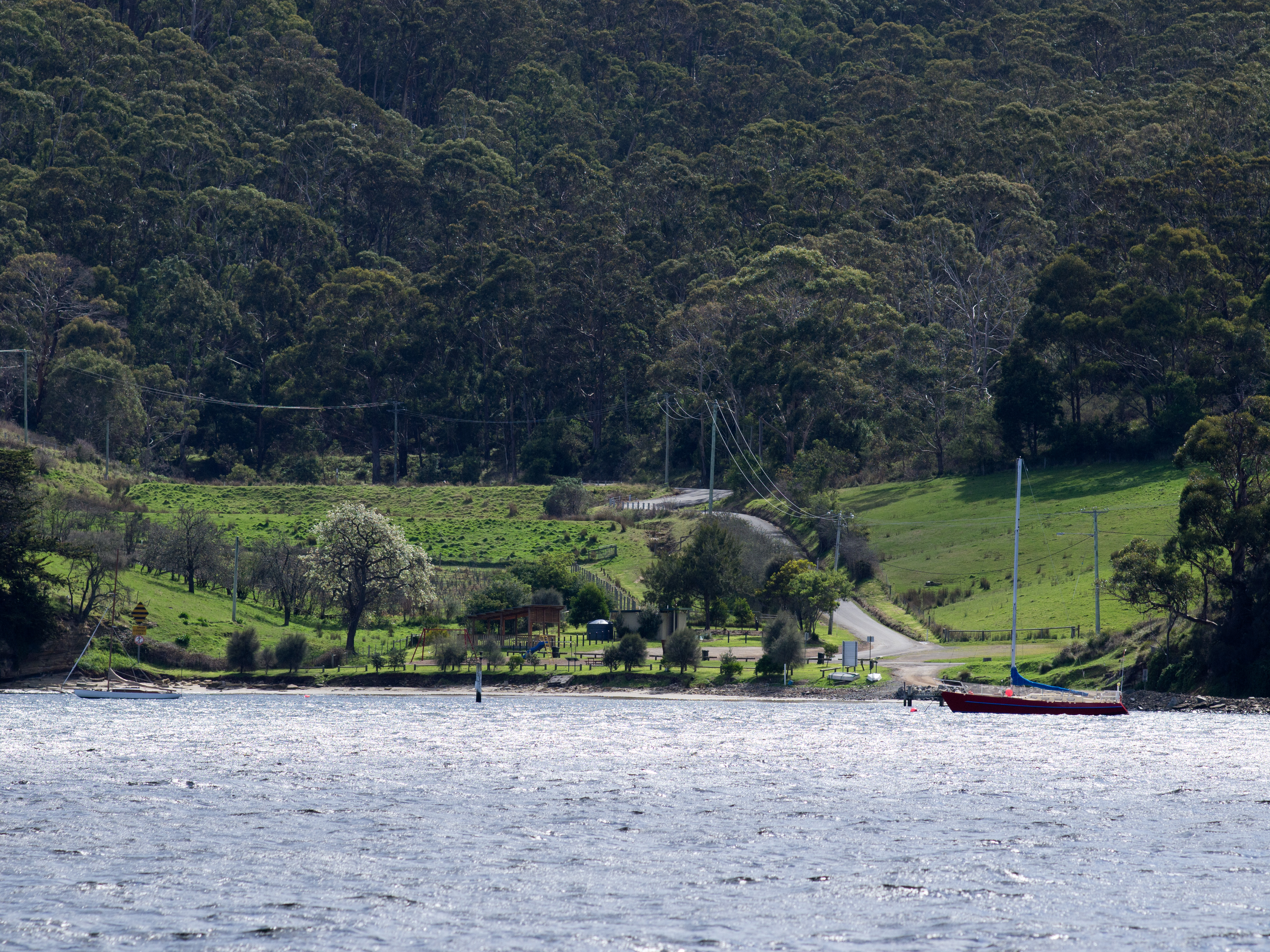
Boat ramp and Tinderbox

IUCN Ia

- Africa Gully
- Albatross Island
- Andersons
- Basin
- Bass Pyramid
- Baynes Island
- Black Pyramid Rock
- Butlers Ridge
- Calverts Hill
- Cape Bernier
- Cape Deslacs
- Christmas Island
- Coal River Gorge
- Councillor Island
- Curtis Island
- Dead Dog Hill
- Dennes Hill
- Devils Tower
- Diamond Island
- Dickinsons
- Dry Creek East
- Dry Creek South
- Dry Creek West
- Duckholes Lagoons
- Elderslie
- Foster Islands
- George Rocks
- Hardys Hill
- Hawley
- Heathy Hills
- Hospital Creek
- Huntingdon
- Ile Des Phoques
- Ironpot Gully
- Isabella Island
- Isle of Caves
- Kentford Forest
- Lachlan Island
- Lake Johnston
- Little Christmas Island
- Little Swan Island
- Little Waterhouse Island
- Low Islets
- Macquarie Island (World Heritage)
- Mersey Hill Karst
- Moriarty Rocks
- North East Islet
- Paddys Island
- Pelham
- Pelham North
- Pelham West
- Penguin Islet
- Powranna
- Reid Rocks
- Rocka Rivulet
- Rodondo Island
- Sith Cala
- Spectacle Islands
- Tenth Island
- The Doughboys
- Tinderbox
- West Moncoeur Island
- Wingaroo
- Woodvine
- Wright Rock

IUCN IV

- Betsey Island
- Big Green Island
- Chappell Islands
- Cherry Tree Hill
- East Kangaroo Island
- Green Island
- Jordan
- Muddy Lagoon
- Narrows Road
- Native Point
- Pitt Water
- Three Sisters-Goat Island
- Tom Gibson
- Township Lagoon

IUCN V

- Badger Box Creek
- Lily Lagoon

=== Marine nature reserves ===
Nature reserves that are marine protected areas cover about 76,000 ha (190,000 acres) of state waters (includes Macquarie Island).

- Governor Island
- Macquarie Island
- Ninepin Point
- Tinderbox

== Regional reserves ==
May have also previously been known as forest reserves, a regional reserve is an area of land with a high mineral potential or prospectively and is predominantly in a natural state. The purpose of reservation is for mineral exploration and the development of mineral deposits and/or the controlled use of other natural resources, including special species timber harvesting, while protecting and maintaining the natural and cultural values. There are 148 regional reserves covering an area of about 454,000 ha (1,120,000 acres), a majority are IUCN protected area category IV.

IUCN III

- Dip Falls
- Hardings Falls
- Julius River
- Lake Chisholm
- Mount Puzzler
- South Weld
- Sumac

IUCN IV

- Andersons Creek
- Apslawn
- Arm River
- Avenue River
- Badger River
- Balfour Track
- Bells Marsh
- Black Creek
- Black Jack Hill
- Blue Tier
- Boco Creek
- Bond Tier
- Bonneys Tier
- Borradaile
- Break O'Day
- Burns Peak
- Caroline Creek
- Coppermine Creek
- Crayfish Creek
- Cygnet River
- Deep Gully
- Den Ranges
- Derby
- Dial Range
- Dickies Ridge
- Dip River
- Dismal Swamp
- Doctors Peak
- Dogs Head Hill
- Dove River
- Emu Ground
- Fords Pinnacle
- Frome
- German Town
- Hatfield River
- Henty
- Huntsmans Cap
- Huskisson River
- John Lynch
- Joy Creek
- Kohls Falls
- Lady Binney
- Lady Nelson
- Lake Pieman
- Laurel Creek
- Lefroy
- Lobster Rivulet
- Long Ridge
- Lovells Creek
- Lower Marsh Creek
- Luncheon Hill
- Lutregala Creek
- Mackintosh
- Maggs Mountain
- Martins Hill
- Mathinna Falls
- Mersey White Water
- Milkshake Hills
- Montagu River
- Montagu Swamp
- Mount Arthur
- Mount Careless
- Mount Horror / Konewongener
- Mount Kershaw
- Mount Maurice
- Mount Stronach
- Mount Victoria
- Nicholas Range
- North Esk
- North Scottsdale
- Nunamara
- Old Park
- Oxberry Plains
- Paradise Plains
- Parangana Sugarloaf
- Peaked Hill
- Pepper Hill
- Pipers River
- Porcupine Hill
- Promised Land
- Prossers
- Pruana
- Rayners Hill
- Ringarooma River
- Roaring Magg Hill
- Savage River Pipeline
- Sawmill Creek
- Sawpit Ridge
- Scamander
- Shakespeare Hills
- Snow Hill
- Snowy River
- South Esk
- Staverton
- Swan River
- Teds Flat
- Tombstone Creek
- Trowutta
- Waratah Creek
- Warra Creek
- Weavers Creek
- Welcome Swamp
- Winterbrook Falls

IUCN V

- Evercreech
- Humboldt Ridge
- Lizard Hill
- Styx River
- Weld River

IUCN VI

- Avoca
- Barway Spur
- Briggs
- Cameron
- Castle Cary
- Clear Hill
- Crotty Ridge
- Dip Range
- Dog Kennels
- Florentine River
- Four Mile Beach
- Gog Range
- Leven Canyon
- Lukes Knob
- Meredith Range
- Mount Dundas
- Mount Farrell
- Mount Heemskirk
- Mount Murchison
- Mount Roland
- Parting Creek
- Renison Bell
- St Pauls
- Teepookana
- Tikkawoppa Plateau
- Tyndall
- West Coast Range

== State reserves ==
An area of land which provides protection and maintenance for significant natural landscapes, features, or sites of significance to Aboriginal people. There are 65 state reserves covering an area of about 47,000 ha (120,000 acres). Most are IUCN protected area category II or III.

IUCN Ia

- Dart Island
- Iron Pot

IUCN II

- Alum Cliffs
- Calm Bay
- Devils Gullet
- Disappointment Bay
- East Risdon
- Echo Sugarloaf
- Hellyer Gorge
- Lavinia
- Lime Bay
- Peter Murrell
- Pieman River
- St Patricks Head
- Three Hummock Island
- Welcome River
- Wye River

IUCN III

- Bradys Lookout
- Cape Wickham
- Derwent Cliffs
- Eaglehawk Bay
- Eugenana
- Fairy Glade
- Ferndene
- Forest Vale
- Forth Falls
- Gunns Plains Cave
- Hastings Caves
- Henty Glacial Erratics
- Holwell Gorge
- Ida Bay
- Junee Cave
- Kimberley Springs
- Liffey Falls
- Little Peggs Beach
- Lookout Rock
- Marriotts Falls
- Mersey Bluff
- Mount Barrow
- Mount Barrow Falls
- Mount Montgomery
- Mount Pearson
- Notley Gorge
- Quarantine Station
- Roger River
- Safety Cove
- Seal Rocks
- St Columba Falls
- St Marys Pass
- Stewarts Bay
- Sundown Point
- Table Cape
- Tessellated Pavement
- The Nut
- The Steppes
- Three Thumbs
- Trial Harbour
- Trowutta Caves
- Waterfall Creek
- Weldborough Pass
- West Point
- Yellow Creek

== See also ==
- Protected areas of Australia

== Notes ==
- Definitions for the classes of protected areas within this article (see: Nature Conservation Act 2002 - Section 78 Schedule 1: Determination of class of reserved land) may be regionally specific to the state of Tasmania.
