= Dismal Swamp =

Dismal Swamp may refer to:

== Australia ==
- Dismal Swamp, South Australia
- Dismal Swamp Regional Reserve, a protected area of Tasmania

== United States ==
- Dismal Swamp (New Jersey), a swamp in New Jersey
- Dismal Swamp State Park, a protected area in North Carolina
- Great Dismal Swamp, near Virginia and North Carolina
  - Dismal Swamp Canal, a canal in Virginia and North Carolina
