= List of Ramsar sites in Australia =

Ramsar logo

This is a list of wetlands in Australia that are designated by the Ramsar Convention as sites of international importance. Under the convention, the wetlands are considered as being of significant value not only for the Australian community, but for humanity as a whole.

The Ramsar Convention on Wetlands came into force for Australia on 21 December 1975. As of 28 February 2018, Australia has 66 sites designated as Wetlands of International Importance, with a total area of 8,342,175 hectares (20,613,960 acres).

== Management of Ramsar wetlands in the Australian jurisdiction ==
The management of Ramsar sites listed within Australia is controlled at national level by the Australian government via the Environment Protection and Biodiversity Conservation Act 1999 and its accompanying regulations, the Environment Protection and Biodiversity Conservation Regulations 2000.

The act, as of 2015, lists the principles required for meeting treaty obligations in respect to "wetlands of international importance" including "environmental approvals" (i.e. sections 16-17B), the prerequisites for the making of both "declarations" and "bilateral agreements" (i.e. sections 34C and 37F, and 52 respectively), the approval process (i.e. section 138), "strategic assessments" (i.e. section 134J), and the management approach (i.e. sections 325 to 336 inclusive).

The applicable regulation (i.e. regulation 10.02) lists three requirements as of 2015. Firstly, a set of general principles for management is described including the need for "public consultation," the involvement of parties with an interest and/or who may be affected by the management of wetland, as well as allowing for "continuing community and technical input." Secondly, the requirements for the management plan to be prepared for each listed wetland are described. Thirdly, the requirements for the "environmental impact assessment and approval" are described for parties wishing to undertake activities that are likely to have "a significant impact on the ecological character of a Ramsar wetland."

== Australian Capital Territory ==
The following wetlands are located in the Australian Capital Territory:

Ramsar wetlands of the Australian Capital Territory
Name	Location	Coordinates	Area	Designated	Designation No.	Description	Image
Ginini Flats Subalpine Bog Complex	Namadgi National Park	35°31′S 148°46′E	125 ha (309 acres)	11 March 1996	RS793		

== New South Wales ==
The following wetlands are located in New South Wales:

Ramsar wetlands of New South Wales
Name	Location	Coordinates	Area	Designated	Designation No.	Description	Image
Blue Lake	Kosciuszko National Park	36°24′S 148°19′E	320 hectares (790 acres)	17 March 1996	RS800		
Caryapundy Swamp	Narriearra Caryapundy Swamp National Park	29°15′S 142°31′E	70,176.2 hectares (173,409 acres)	17 December 2021	RS2520		
Fivebough and Tuckerbil Swamps	Riverina	34°30′S 146°23′E	689 hectares (1,700 acres)	21 October 2002	RS1224		
Gwydir Wetlands	North West Slopes	34°30′S 146°23′E	823 hectares (2,030 acres)	14 June 1999	RS993		
Hunter Estuary Wetlands	Newcastle	32°52′S 151°43′E	2,971 hectares (7,340 acres)	21 February 1984	RS287		
Little Llangothlin Lagoon	Northern Tablelands	30°05′S 151°47′E	258 hectares (640 acres)	17 March 1996	RS798		
Lake Pinaroo	Sturt National Park, Far West	29°06′S 141°13′E	800 hectares (2,000 acres)	17 March 1996	RS799		
Macquarie Marshes	North West Slopes	30°45′S 147°44′E	18,726 hectares (46,270 acres)	1 August 1986	RS337		
Myall Lakes	Mid North Coast	32°30′S 152°17′E	44,612 hectares (110,240 acres)	14 June 1999	RS994		
Narran Wetlands	North West Slopes	29°43′S 147°26′E	5,530 hectares (13,700 acres)	14 June 1999	RS995		
Central Murray Forests	Riverina	35°39′S 144°39′E	84,028 hectares (207,640 acres)	20 May 2003	RS1291		
Paroo River Wetlands	Far West	30°20′S 143°51′E	138,304 hectares (341,760 acres)	13 September 2007	RS1716		
Towra Point Nature Reserve	Sutherland Shire, Sydney	34°00′S 151°10′E	386 hectares (950 acres)	21 February 1984	RS286		

== Northern Territory ==
The following wetlands are located in the Northern Territory:

Ramsar wetlands of the Northern Territory
Name	Location	Coordinates	Area	Designated	Designation No.	Description	Image
Cobourg Peninsula	Garig Gunak Barlu National Park	11°15′S 132°15′E	220,700 hectares (545,000 acres)	8 May 1974	RS1		
Kakadu National Park (Stage 1)	Alligator Rivers, Kakadu National Park	12°40′S 132°45′E	683,000 hectares (1,690,000 acres)	12 June 1980	RS204		
Kakadu National Park (Stage 2)	Alligator Rivers, Kakadu National Park	12°30′S 132°30′E	692,940 hectares (1,712,300 acres)	15 September 1989	RS441		

== Queensland ==
The following wetlands are located in Queensland:

Ramsar wetlands of Queensland
Name	Location	Coordinates	Area	Designated	Designation No.	Description	Image
Bowling Green Bay	North Queensland	19°27′S 147°15′E	35,500 hectares (88,000 acres)	22 October 1993	RS632		
Currawinya Lakes	South West Queensland	28°45′S 144°19′E	151,300 hectares (374,000 acres)	11 March 1996	RS791		
Great Sandy Strait	Wide Bay–Burnett	25°28′S 152°54′E	93,160 hectares (230,200 acres)	14 June 1999	RS992		
Moreton Bay	South East Queensland	27°20′S 153°10′E	113,314 hectares (280,000 acres)	22 October 1993	RS631		
Shoalwater and Corio Bays	Central Queensland	22°40′S 150°17′E	239,100 hectares (591,000 acres)	11 March 1996	RS792		

== South Australia ==
The following wetlands are located in South Australia:

Ramsar wetlands of South Australia
Name	Location	Coordinates	Area	Designated	Designation No.	Description	Image
Banrock Station Wetland Complex	Riverland	34°11′S 140°20′E	1,375 hectares (3,400 acres)	21 October 2002	RS1221		
Bool and Hacks Lagoons	Limestone Coast	37°08′S 140°41′E	3,200 hectares (7,900 acres)	1 November 1985	RS322		
Coongie Lakes	Lake Eyre Basin	27°27′S 140°00′E	1,980,000 hectares (4,900,000 acres)	1 June 1987	RS376		
Coorong and Lakes Alexandrina and Albert Wetland	Lake Alexandrina	35°56′S 139°18′E	140,500 hectares (347,000 acres)	1 November 1985	RS321		
Piccaninnie Ponds Karst Wetlands	Limestone Coast	38°3′3″S 140°56′11″E	862 hectares (2,130 acres)	21 December 2012	RS2136		
Riverland Ramsar site	Riverland	34°02′S 140°51′E	30,600 hectares (76,000 acres)	23 September 1987	RS377		

== Tasmania ==
The following wetlands are located in Tasmania:

Ramsar wetlands of Tasmania
Name	Location	Coordinates	Area	Designated	Designation No.	Description	Image
Apsley Marshes	Freycinet Peninsula	41°56′S 148°12′E	880 hectares (2,200 acres)	16 November 1982	RS255		
Cape Barren Island, east coast lagoons	Furneaux Group	40°22′S 148°23′E	4,370 hectares (10,800 acres)	16 November 1982	RS255		
Interlaken Lakeside Reserve	Central Highlands	42°09′S 147°10′E	520 hectares (1,300 acres)	16 November 1982	RS259		
Jocks Lagoon	St Helens	41°21′S 148°18′E	18 hectares (44 acres)	16 November 1982	RS258		
Lavinia	King Island	39°45′S 144°05′E	7,020 hectares (17,300 acres)	16 November 1982	RS253		
Little Waterhouse Lake	North East	40°52′S 147°37′E	57 hectares (140 acres)	16 November 1982	RS260		
Logan Lagoon	Flinders Island, Furneaux Group	40°10′S 148°17′E	2,320 hectares (5,700 acres)	16 November 1982	RS252		
Lower Ringarooma River	North East	40°54′S 147°56′E	4,160 hectares (10,300 acres)	16 November 1982	RS257		
Moulting Lagoon Nature Reserve	Freycinet Peninsula	42°05′S 148°10′E	4,580 hectares (11,300 acres)	16 November 1982	RS251		
Pittwater-Orielton Lagoon	Southern Tasmania	42°48′S 147°30′E	3,175 hectares (7,850 acres)	16 November 1982	RS254		

== Victoria ==
The following wetlands are located in Victoria:

Ramsar wetlands of Victoria
Name	Location	Coordinates	Area	Designated	Designation No.	Description	Image
Barmah Forest	Goulburn Valley, Hume	35°55′S 145°08′E	28,515 hectares (70,460 acres)	15 December 1982	RS262		
Corner Inlet	South Gippsland	38°45′S 146°32′E	67,186 hectares (166,020 acres)	15 December 1982	RS261		
Glenelg Estuary and Discovery Bay Ramsar Site	Glenelg Shire	38°05′S 141°07′E	22,289 hectares (55,080 acres)	28 February 2018	RS2344		
Edithvale-Seaford Wetlands	Port Phillip	38°04′S 145°07′E	261 hectares (640 acres)	29 August 2001	RS1096		
Gippsland Lakes	East Gippsland	38°00′S 147°36′E	60,015 hectares (148,300 acres)	15 December 1982	RS269		
Gunbower Forest		35°49′S 144°19′E	19,931 hectares (49,250 acres)	15 December 1982	RS263		
Hattah-Kulkyne Lakes	Murray Mallee	34°41′S 142°26′E	955 hectares (2,360 acres)	15 December 1982	RS264		
Kerang Wetlands	Murray Mallee	35°40′S 143°56′E	9,419 hectares (23,270 acres)	15 December 1982	RS265		
Lake Albacutya	Wimmera	35°46′S 141°58′E	5,731 hectares (14,160 acres)	15 December 1982	RS270		
Port Phillip Bay and Bellarine Peninsula	Port Phillip, Bellarine Peninsula	38°04′S 144°36′E	22,897 hectares (56,580 acres)	15 December 1982	RS266		
Western District Lakes	Western District	38°10′S 143°31′E	32,898 hectares (81,290 acres)	15 December 1982	RS268		
Western Port Bay	Western Port	38°22′S 145°17′E	59,297 hectares (146,530 acres)	15 December 1982	RS267		

== Western Australia ==
The following wetlands are located in Western Australia:

Ramsar wetlands of Western Australia
Name	Location	Coordinates	Area	Designated	Designation No.	Description	Image
Becher Point Wetlands	Swan Coastal Plain	32°23′S 115°44′E	677 hectares (1,670 acres)	5 January 2001	RS1048		
Eighty Mile Beach	Kimberley	19°31′S 120°40′E	125,000 hectares (310,000 acres)	7 June 1990	RS480		
Forrestdale and Thomsons Lakes	Swan Coastal Plain	32°09′S 115°52′E	754 hectares (1,860 acres)	7 June 1990	RS481		
Lake Gore	Goldfields-Esperance	33°47′S 121°29′E	4,017 hectares (9,930 acres)	5 January 2001	RS1049		
Lake Warden System	Goldfields-Esperance	33°48′S 121°56′E	2,300 hectares (5,700 acres)	7 June 1990	RS485		
Lakes Argyle and Kununurra	Kimberley	16°19′S 128°44′E	150,000 hectares (370,000 acres)	7 June 1990	RS478		
Muir-Byenup System	South West	34°29′S 116°43′E	10,631 hectares (26,270 acres)	5 January 2001	RS1050		
Ord River Floodplain	Kimberley	15°15′S 128°22′E	141,453 hectares (349,540 acres)	7 June 1990	RS477		
Peel-Yalgorup System	Swan Coastal Plain	32°49′S 115°42′E	26,530 hectares (65,600 acres)	7 June 1990	RS482		
Roebuck Bay	Kimberley	18°07′S 122°16′E	55,000 hectares (140,000 acres)	7 June 1990	RS479		
Toolibin Lake	Wheatbelt	32°55′S 117°36′E	493 hectares (1,220 acres)	7 June 1990	RS483		
Vasse-Wonnerup System	South West	33°37′S 115°25′E	1,115 hectares (2,760 acres)	7 June 1990	RS484		

== External territories ==
The following wetlands are located in the External territories:

Ramsar wetlands of the External territories
Name	Location	Coordinates	Area	Designated	Designation No.	Description	Image
Ashmore Reef National Nature Reserve	Ashmore and Cartier Islands	12°15′S 123°02′E	58,300 hectares (144,000 acres)	21 October 2002	RS1220		
Coral Sea Reserves (Coringa-Herald and Lihou Reef and Cays)	Coral Sea Islands Territory	17°04′S 150°39′E	1,729,200 hectares (4,273,000 acres)	21 October 2002	RS1222		
The Dales	Christmas Island	10°28′S 105°33′E	57 hectares (140 acres)	21 October 2002	RS1225		
Elizabeth and Middleton Reefs Marine National Nature Reserve	Coral Sea Islands Territory	29°41′S 159°06′E	188,000 hectares (460,000 acres)	21 October 2002	RS1223		
Hosnies Spring	Christmas Island	10°28′S 105°41′E	1 hectare (2.5 acres)	11 December 1990	RS512		
Pulu Keeling National Park	Cocos (Keeling) Islands	11°50′S 96°49′E	122 hectares (300 acres)	17 March 1996	RS797		

== See also ==
- List of Ramsar sites worldwide
- A Directory of Important Wetlands in Australia
