= Montumana =

- Town
- Coordinates: 40°57′18″S 145°31′15″E
- Country: Australia
- State: Tasmania
- Region: North-west and west
- LGA: Circular Head, Waratah–Wynyard
- Location: 24 km (15 mi) W of Wynyard

Government
  - State electorate: Braddon
  - Federal division: Braddon

Population
  - Total: 67 (2016 census)
- Postcode: 7321
Localities around Montumana
Rocky Cape	Rocky Cape	Rocky Cape
Mawbanna	Montumana	Sisters Creek
Mawbanna	Mawbanna	Sisters Creek

Montumana is a rural locality in the local government areas (LGA) of Circular Head and Waratah–Wynyard in the North-west and west LGA region of Tasmania. The locality is about 24 kilometres (15 mi) west of the town of Wynyard. The 2016 census recorded a population of 67 for the state suburb of Montumana.

== History ==
Montumana was gazetted as a locality in 1966. Previously known as Detention River East and then as Ellison, the current name was approved in 1966.

== Geography ==
The Detention River forms a small part of the northern boundary. Many of the boundaries are survey lines.

== Road infrastructure ==
Route A2 (Bass Highway) runs through from east to north.

== See also ==
- Detention Falls
