= Banksia Grove =

Banksia Grove may refer to places in Australia:

- Banksia Grove, Western Australia, a suburb of Perth
- Banksia Grove (Tasmania), a forest
