= Logan Lagoon =

Coordinates: 40°10′00″S 148°17′20″E

Designations

Ramsar Wetland
- Official name: Logan Lagoon
- Designated: 16 November 1982
- Reference no.: 252

Logan Lagoon is a 2172 ha wetland Conservation Area on Flinders Island, the largest of the Furneaux Group at the eastern end of Bass Strait, which is part of the Australian state of Tasmania.

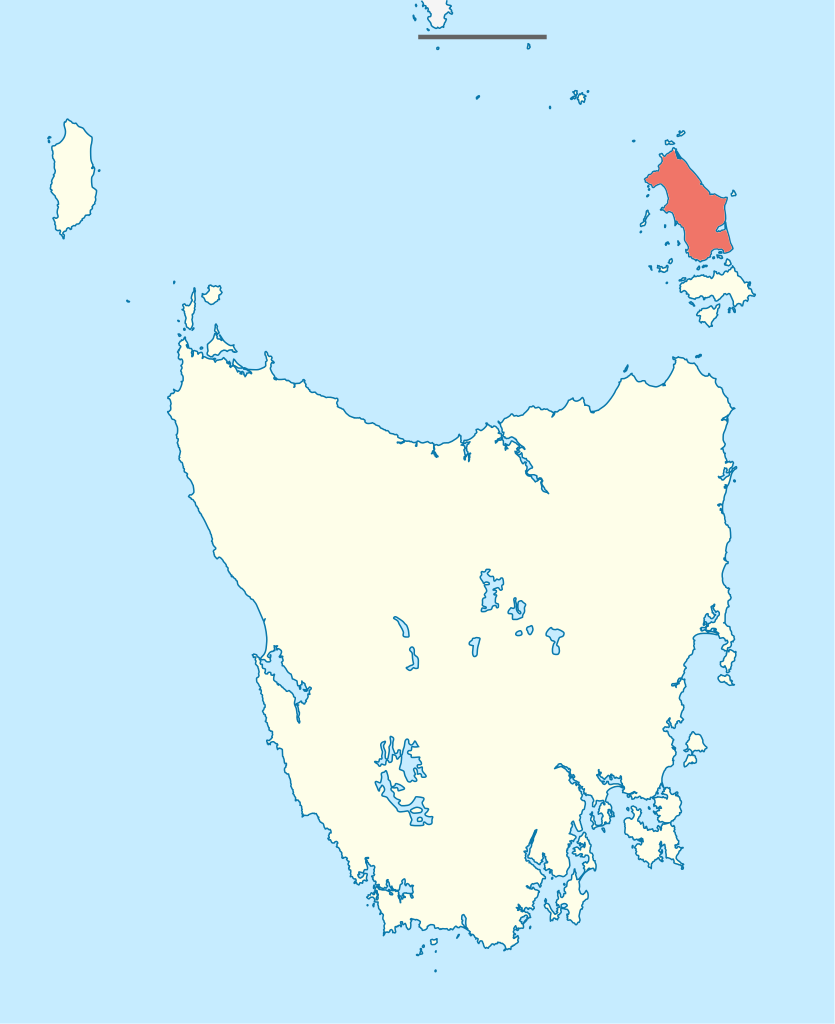
Logan Lagoon is located on Finders island

== History ==
The lagoon area was declared a wildlife sanctuary in 1968, with additional blocks of adjacent land added subsequently. In 1982 it was designated a wetland of international importance under the Ramsar Convention. In 1996 it was declared a Shorebird Network Site.

== Description ==
Logan Lagoon is a coastal wetland complex at the south-eastern corner of Flinders Island, lying some 5 km east of the village of Lady Barron. It is isolated from the sea by a large sand bar which is infrequently breached by either high water levels in the lagoon or by rough seas eroding the bar. The water in the lagoon is generally 1–2 m deep and fluctuates with rainfall, occasionally drying out. The 75 km^{2} catchment of the lagoon is mainly agricultural land.

=== Flora ===
The eastern side of the lagoon has a dense coastal shrubland of coast wattle and coast tea-tree interspersed with grassy patches. Where the land is largely protected from bushfires there is a mixture of forest and scrub dominated by Smithton peppermint, tea-tree, silver banksia and Oyster Bay pine. Some manna gum occurs on dune ridges. In swampy areas there are thickets of coast paperbark. Around the lagoon margins are patches of golden speargrass, coastal tussock grassland, salt-tolerant herbs and samphire.

=== Fauna ===
In winter the lagoon is important as a nesting site for black swans, and in summer as a feeding and resting site for migratory waders, or shorebirds, especially double-banded plovers. Several waterfowl species use the site, including Cape Barren geese.

== See also ==
- Protected areas of Tasmania
- List of Ramsar sites in Australia
