= Port Cygnet Conservation Area =

Protected area in Tasmania, Australia

- IUCN category V (protected landscape/seascape)
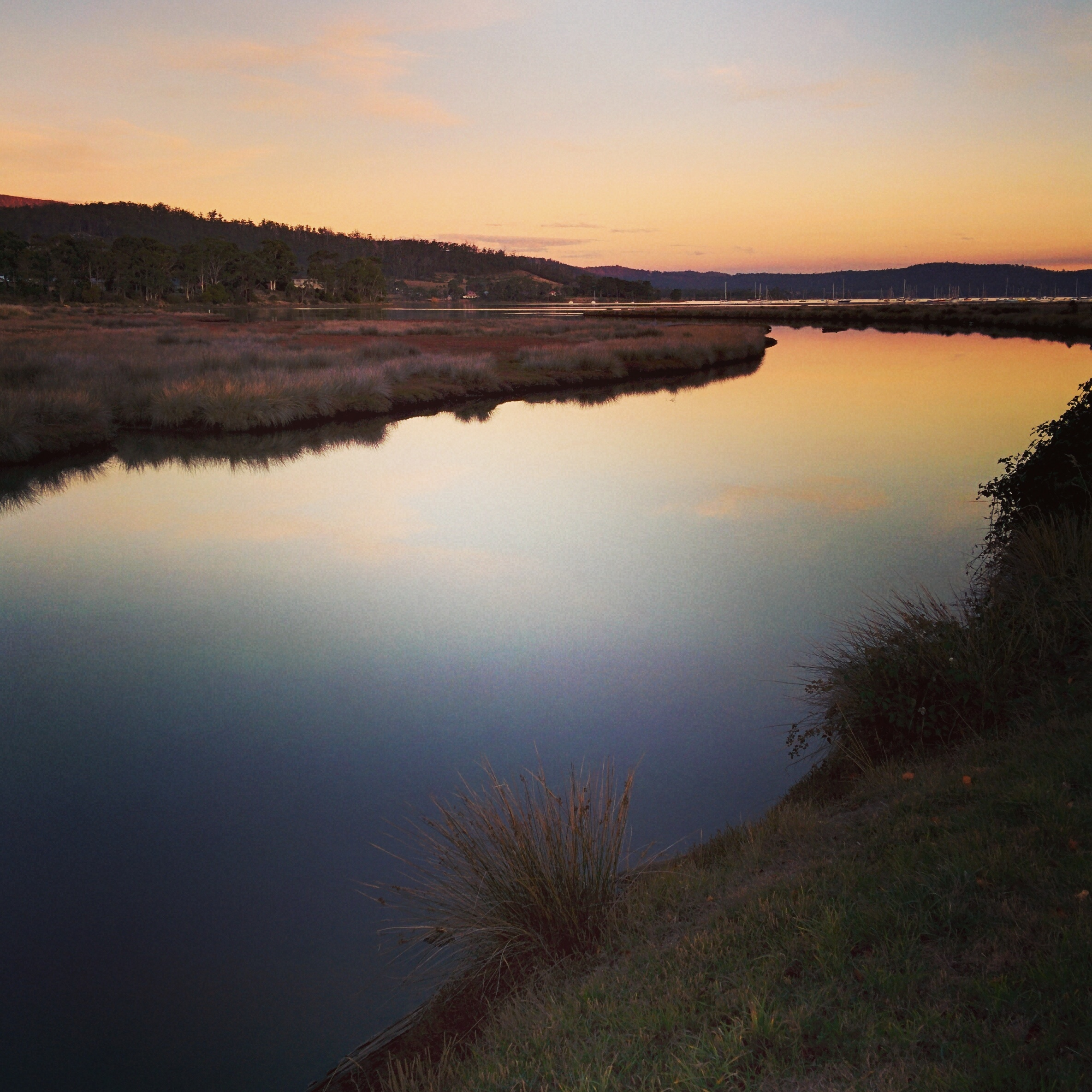
- Port Cygnet Conservation Area

- Location within Tasmania
- Location: Tasmania, Cygnet
- Nearest city: Cygnet, Tasmania
- Coordinates: 43°10′07″S 147°05′38″E
- Area: 103.1 km^{2} (39.8 sq mi)
- Established: 18 June 1952
- Website: Official website

The Port Cygnet Conservation Area is located in Cygnet, Tasmania, approximately 65 km (40 mi) southwest of the state's capital city, Hobart. The reserve has an area of 103 ha (250 acres). It is an open estuary environment including a listed wetland of state significance, being the only Marine Protected Area in the Bruny Bioregion representing the Open Estuaries Biounit.

Port Cygnet was first proclaimed as a wildlife sanctuary in 1952 for the protection of the foreshore and wetlands. The marine component of the reserve area was proclaimed Port Cygnet Marine Conservation Area under the Nature Conservation Act 2002 on 9 December 2009.

The reserve is significant as a refuge area for numerous bird species including migratory birds such as Latham's snipe (Gallinago hardwickii), the great egret (Egretta alba) and the greater crested tern (Sterna bergii).

The wetland harbours species such as the pied oystercatcher (Haematopus longirostris) and white-bellied sea eagle (Haliaeetus leucogaster).

== See also ==
- Protected areas of Tasmania
