= Genoplesium brachystachyum =

Rocky Cape midge orchid

Conservation status
- Endangered (EPBC Act)

Scientific classification
- Kingdom: Plantae
- Clade: Tracheophytes
- Clade: Angiosperms
- Clade: Monocots
- Order: Asparagales
- Family: Orchidaceae
- Subfamily: Orchidoideae
- Tribe: Diurideae
- Genus: Genoplesium
- Species: G. brachystachyum

Binomial name
- Genoplesium brachystachyum (Lindl.)D.L.Jones & M.A.Clem.

Synonyms
- Prasophyllum brachystachyum Lindl.; Corunastylis brachystachya (Lindl.) D.L.Jones & M.A.Clem.

Species of orchid

Genoplesium brachystachyum, commonly known as the Rocky Cape midge orchid or short-spike midge orchid, is a species of small terrestrial orchid endemic to Tasmania. It has a single thin leaf fused to the flowering stem and up to twelve small, green to brownish green, and reddish flowers. It usually grows in heath in rocky places near the coast.

== Description ==
Genoplesium brachystachyum is a terrestrial, perennial, deciduous, herb with an underground tuber and a single thin green leaf with a reddish base and 80–120 mm (3–5 in) long, fused to the flowering stem with the free part 10–20 mm (0.4–0.8 in) long. Between three and twelve green to brownish green flowers are arranged along a flowering stem 10–20 mm (0.4–0.8 in) tall and taller than the leaf. The flowers lean downwards and are about 5 mm (0.2 in) long and 3.5 mm (0.1 in) wide. As with others in the genus, the flowers are inverted so that the labellum is above the column rather than below it. The dorsal sepal is reddish, about 3 mm (0.1 in) long and 2 mm (0.08 in) wide with hairless edges and a sharply pointed tip. The lateral sepals are about 4 mm (0.2 in) long, 1 mm (0.04 in) wide and have a small white gland on the tip. The petals are about 3 mm (0.1 in) long, 1.5 mm (0.06 in) wide and reddish with hairless edges and a sharply pointed tip. The labellum is reddish, narrow elliptic in shape, about 3 mm (0.1 in) long, 1.5 mm (0.06 in) wide, with irregular edges and a sharply pointed tip. There is a callus in the centre of the labellum and extending nearly to its tip. Flowering occurs from February to April.

== Taxonomy and naming ==
The Rocky Cape orchid was first formally described in 1840 by John Lindley who gave it the name Prasophyllum brachystachyum from a specimen collected near Rocky Cape. The description was published in Lindley's book, The Genera and Species of Orchidaceous Plants. In 1989, David Jones and Mark Clements changed the name to Genoplesium brachystachyum and in 2002 changed the name again to Corunastylis brachystachya. The specific epithet (brachystachyum) in derived from the Ancient Greek words brachys meaning "short" and stachys meaning "an ear of grain" or "a spike".

== Distribution and habitat ==
Genoplesium brachystachyum grows in heath and heathy forest, among low shrubs, boulders and rock plates. It is found in disjunct populations containing fewer than 25 individuals near the north and west coasts.

== Conservation ==
The total population of G. brachystachyum is estimated to be less than 250. The main threats to the species are land clearing, inappropriate fire regimes and inappropriate disturbances such as roadworks. The species (as Corunastylis brachystachya) is classed as "Endangered" under the Tasmanian Threatened Species Protection Act 1995 and under the Commonwealth Government Environment Protection and Biodiversity Conservation Act 1999 (EPBC) Act.
