= Wingaroo Nature Reserve =

Protected area in Flinders Island, Australia

Wingaroo Nature Reserve is a protected natural area in the northern part of Flinders Island. Covering 9144 hectares, it contains heath, woodland and wetland, and is home to rare populations of horny cone-bush (Isopogon ceratophyllus), saw banksia (Banksia serrata) and Oyster Bay pine (Callitris rhomboidea), as well as New Holland mouse (Pseudomys novaehollandiae). Initially 202 hectares were established as a protected area in November 1988, before it became Wingaroo Nature Reserve in September 1991 with an additional 8942 hectares were added, bringing it to its current size.

== See also ==
- Protected areas of Tasmania (Australia)
