= Lavinia State Reserve =

Protected area & Ramsar site in Australia

- IUCN category II (national park)
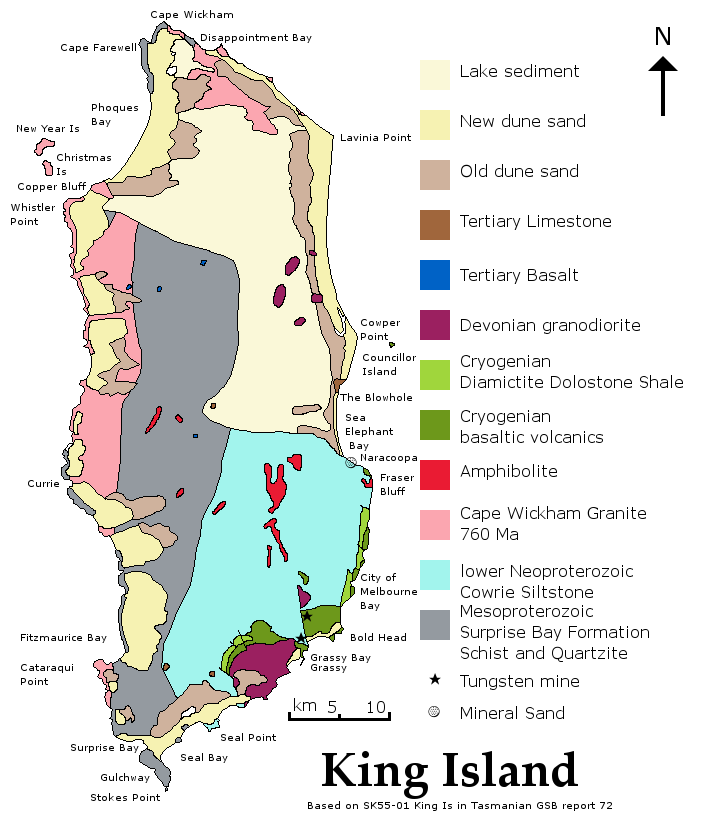
- The state reserve occupies much of the north-eastern coast from north of Lavinia Point southwards to Cowper Point and the estuary of the Sea Elephant River.

- Location within Tasmania
- Location: Tasmania, King Island
- Coordinates: 39°35′42″S 144°00′16″E
- Area: 78.81 km^{2} (30.43 sq mi)
- Established: 7 April 1971
- Governing body: Tasmania Parks and Wildlife Service

Designations

Ramsar Wetland
- Official name: Lavinia
- Designated: 16 November 1982
- Reference no.: 253

Lavinia State Reserve, formerly Lavinia Nature Reserve, is a 68 km^{2} protected area on King Island, lying at the western end of Bass Strait and belonging to the Australian state of Tasmania.

== Description ==
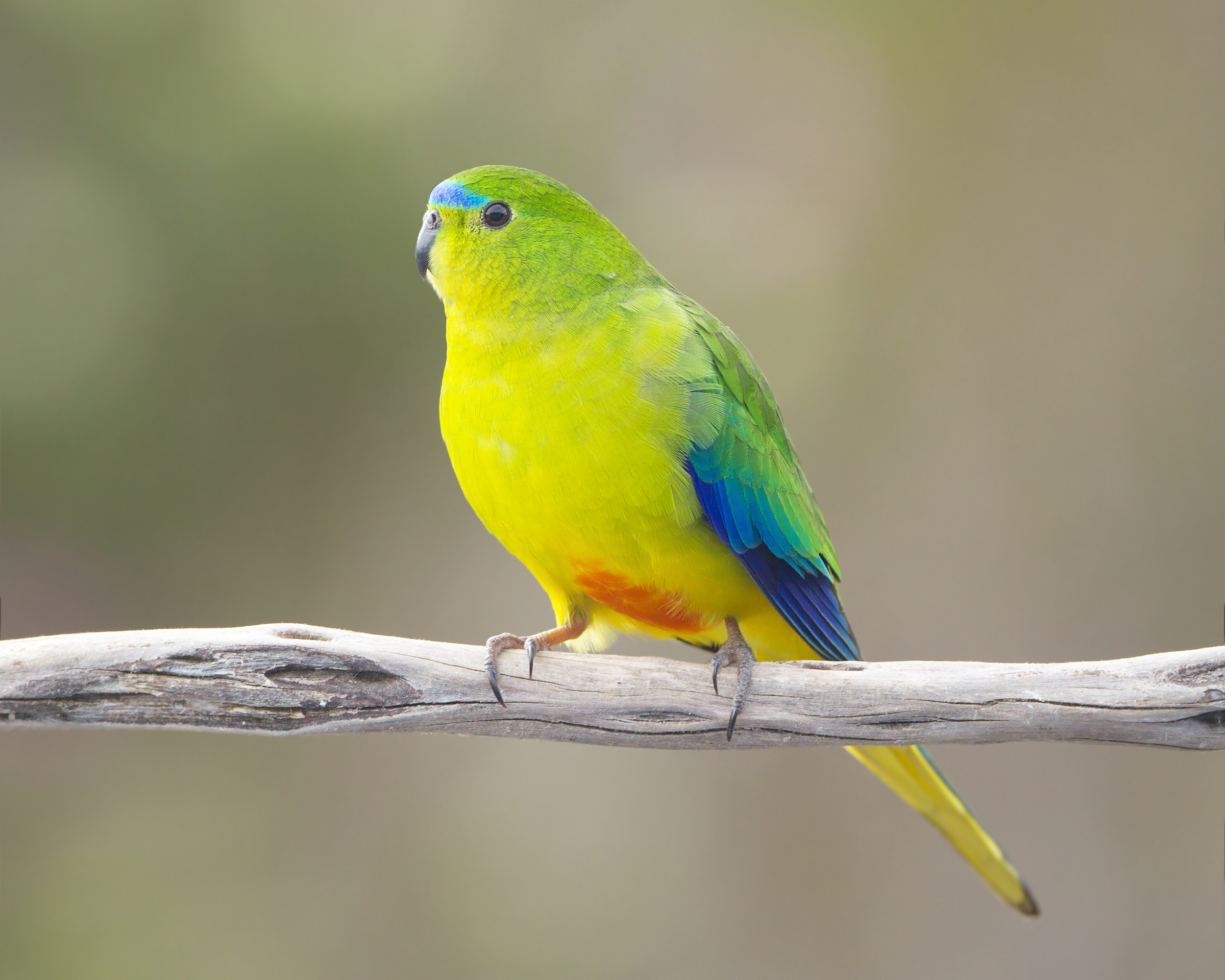
The state reserve provides saltmarsh feeding habitat for orange-bellied parrots on their migration route between south-west Tasmania and southern Victoria

The state reserve encompasses a significant portion of the northeastern coast of the island, stretching from Lake Martha Lavinia and Penny's Lagoon in the north to the Sea Elephant River estuary in the south. It contains swamps, long sandy beaches and coastal heathlands, protecting the largest remaining block of native vegetation on King Island.

== History ==
Reservation of land in what is now the state reserve began in 1959 with the gazettal of the 510 ha Sea Elephant River Wildlife Sanctuary; it was incorporated with additional land to the north in 1971 with the proclamation of the Lavinia Sanctuary. In 1978, land consisting of the Lavinia Nature Reserve and the Sea Elephant Wildlife Sanctuary was listed in the now-defunct Register of the National Estate. In 1983 a 1730 ha area around the Sea Elephant estuary was listed as a wetland of international importance under the Ramsar Convention, being only the fifth Australian site to be so designated. In 1994 the Ramsar site boundary was realigned and extended to correspond with those of the current nature reserve. In 2001, land previously reserved under the name Lavinia Nature Reserve and some associated "reserved land in the class of nature reserve under section 21(1) of the Regional Forest Agreement (Land Classification) Act 1998" was declared as the Lavinia State Reserve.

The name derives from the 52-ton schooner Martha Lavinia, wrecked on a reef offshore in 1871 near what is the site of the state reserve while carrying a cargo of potatoes from Tasmania to Adelaide, which gave its name to several features along the north-eastern King Island coast.

== Flora and fauna ==
=== Flora ===
The state reserve contains three heathland communities: swamp paperbark dry heath, coastal tea tree heath and scented paperbark wet heath. : The vulnerable scrambling ground fern is present. In the past frequent fuel-reduction burning has led to much woody vegetation being replaced by bracken and tussock grassland. Saltmarsh abuts the Sea Elephant estuary.

=== Fauna ===
The state reserve provides habitat for many birds and other animals, including the critically endangered orange-bellied parrot, the extremely rare King Island subspecies of the brown thornbill, and the Southern Hairy Red Snail. Short-tailed shearwaters have colonies in the dunes behind Lavinia Beach while fairy terns nest on the sand spit at the mouth of the Sea Elephant River. Hooded plovers and pied oystercatchers nest on the beaches. The marshy grassland surrounding the estuary is home to the only known Tasmanian population of the golden-headed cisticola.

== See also ==
- Protected areas of Tasmania
- List of Ramsar sites in Australia
