= Devils Gullet State Reserve =

- IUCN category II (national park)
- Location within Tasmania
- Location: Tasmania
- Coordinates: 41°40′25″S 146°20′19″E
- Area: 11.08 km^{2} (4.28 sq mi)
- Established: 1972
- Governing body: Tasmania Parks and Wildlife Service

UNESCO World Heritage Site
- Criteria: Cultural: iii, iv, vi, vii; natural: viii, ix, x
- Reference: 181
- Inscription: 1982 (6th Session)

Devils Gullet is a protected area in Tasmania, Australia. It is part of the Tasmanian Wilderness World Heritage Area. From the reserve, visitors unable or unwilling to hike the challenging Walls of Jerusalem National Park can catch a glimpse of the stunning landscape. The viewing platform is located near Mole Creek Karst National Park.

Devils Gullet was significantly impacted by the 2016 Tasmanian bushfires.

== See also ==
- Protected areas of Tasmania
