= Crayfish Creek =

River in Tasmania, Australia

Coordinates: 40°52′S 145°24′E

Crayfish Creek is listed as a protected forest reserve in North West Tasmania, Australia. It is home to the endangered Tasmanian giant freshwater crayfish (Astacopsis gouldi) and - theoretically, rather than in practice - subject to federal protection under the Environment Protection and Biodiversity Conservation Act 1999.

Since about 1999, Crayfish Creek has been subject to heavy industrial logging in the upper catchment with local residents attributing this as a cause for a significant loss of water volume. A prominent geohydrologist in the State, Dr David Leaman, noted that it was difficult to see whether a buffer zone ever existed upstream from Crayfish Creek, observing that this could be a significant contributor to the drying up of the water body further downstream. This view was made in the context of the fact that the overwhelming majority scientists who have provided input on the need for adequate stream reserves under the Tasmanian Forest Practices Code have been clear that at least a 30-metre buffer zone around Class two, three and four streams should be implemented.

== See also ==
- Protected areas of Tasmania
