= Royal George, Tasmania =

Royal George
- Town
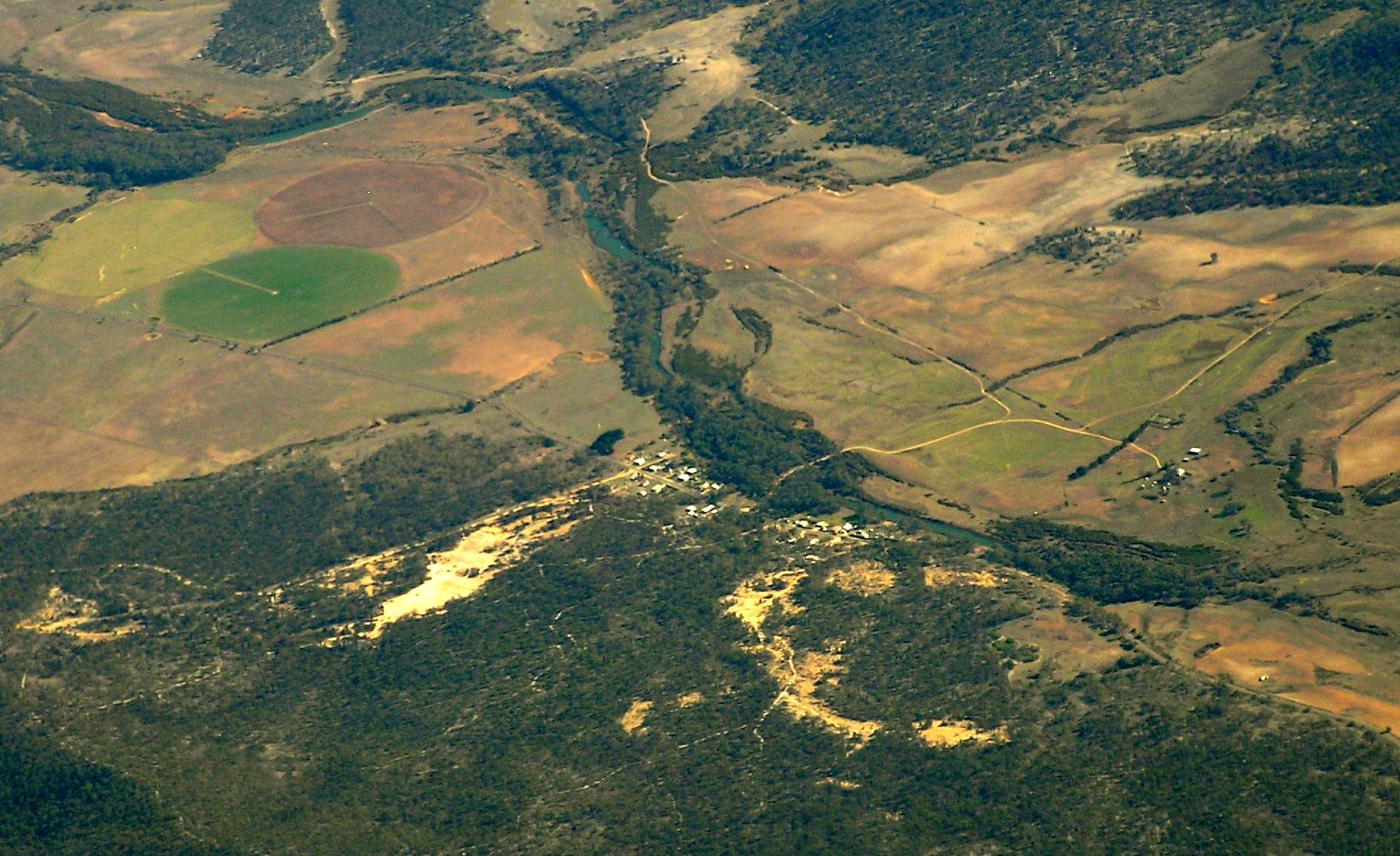
- Aerial photo from the east

- Coordinates: 41°49′20″S 147°53′28″E
- Country: Australia
- State: Tasmania
- Region: Central, North-east, South-east
- LGA: Northern Midlands Council (46%), Break O'Day Council (27%), Glamorgan-Spring Bay Council (27%)
- Location: 86 km (53 mi) SE of Longford

Government
  - State electorate: Lyons
  - Federal division: Lyons

Population
  - Total: 59 (2021 census)
- Postcode: 7213
Localities around Royal George
Fingal	Fingal	St Marys
Avoca, Lake Leake	Royal George	Douglas-Apsley
Lake Leake	Cranbrook	Cranbrook

Royal George is a rural locality in the local government areas (LGA) of Northern Midlands (46%), Break O'Day (27%) and Glamorgan-Spring Bay (27%) in the Central, North-east and South-east LGA regions of Tasmania. The locality is about 86 kilometres (53 mi) south-east of the town of Longford. The 2016 census recorded a population of 45 for the state suburb of Royal George.

It is a village in northeast Tasmania on the St Pauls River.

At the 2006 census, Royal George had a population of 127.

It was a mining village, with the mine and locality named after one of the Royal Navy vessels named HMS Royal George from the 19th century. HMS Royal George was under the command of Captain Robert Hepburn during the Napoleonic Wars Captain Hepburn settled nearby at Roy's Hill in 1828.

== History ==
Royal George was gazetted as a locality in 1954.

The first Royal George Post Office opened on 5 May 1914 and closed in 1920. The second office opened in 1955 and closed in 1971. Royal George is served by a school bus that takes students to Avoca Primary School and Campbell Town District High School. As of 2018, there is a population of around 28 people living in Royal George.

== Geography ==
Many of the boundaries are survey lines. St Pauls River, a tributary of the South Esk River, rises in the north and flows through to the west.

== Road infrastructure ==
Route C301 (Royal George Road / Old Coach Road) runs through from west to south-east, which is the only road that provides access to the locality.
