= Banksia Grove (Tasmania) =

Forest in Tasmania, Australia

Coordinates: 40°54′S 145°32′E

Banksia Grove is a forest in the Rocky Cape National Park on the north west coast of Tasmania, Australia. The name refers to the plant genus Banksia, which grows in the area.
