= Reid Rocks =

Australian nature reserve

Coordinates: 40°14′S 144°10′E

Reid Rocks is a small island nature reserve in south-eastern Australia. It is part of Tasmania’s New Year Island Group, which includes the much larger King Island, lying north-west of Tasmania in Bass Strait. It is frequently wave-washed and lacks vegetation.

== Fauna ==
Reid Rocks is the only breeding site for Australian fur seals in western Bass Strait. During the 1990s annual mean seal pup production was 1500.
