= Detention Falls =

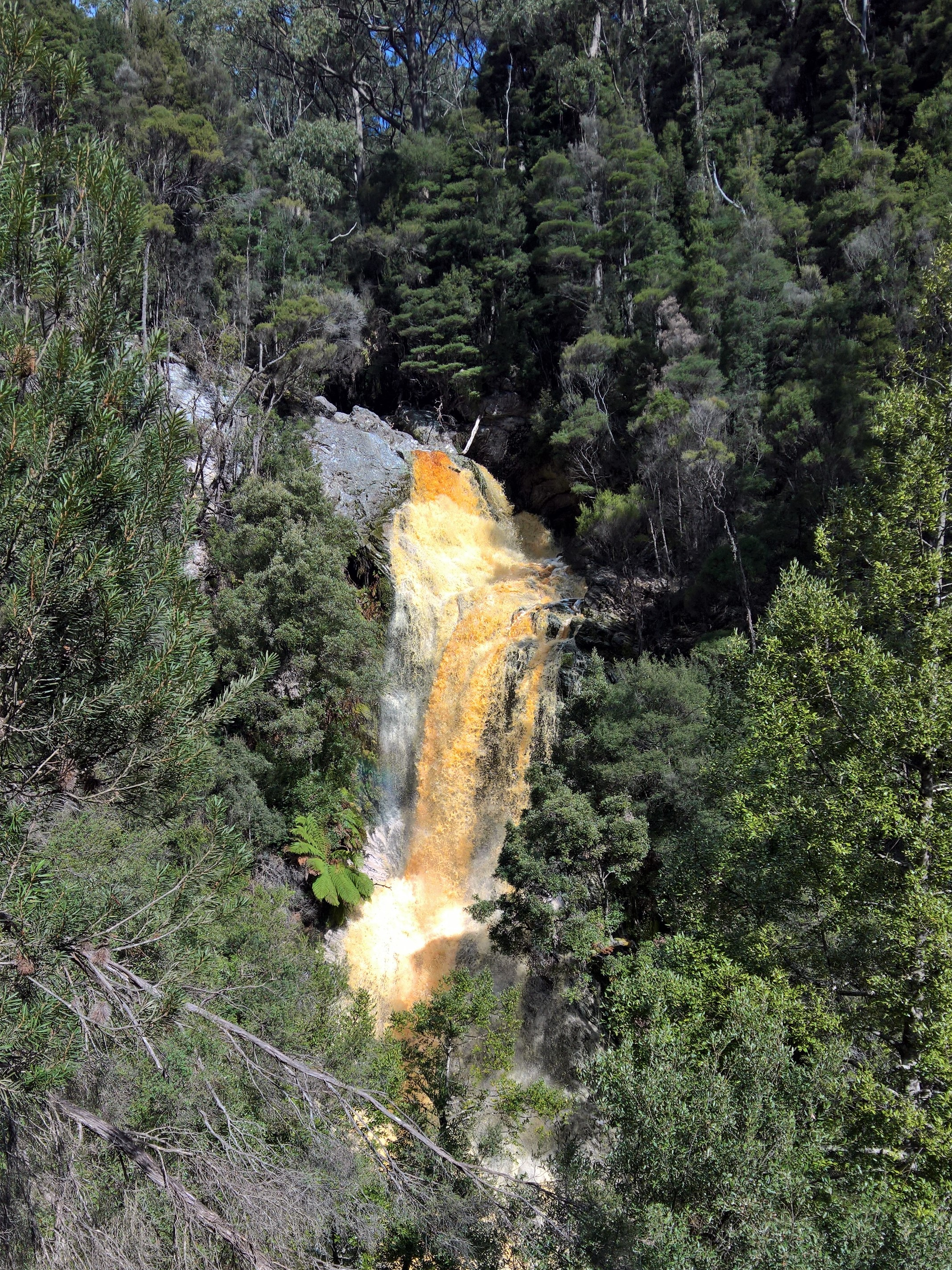
- Detention Falls

- Location within Tasmania
- Location: North West Tasmania, Australia
- Coordinates: 41°0′14″S 145°31′33″E
- Type: Cascade
- Elevation: 220m
- Total height: 30 metres (98 ft)
- Watercourse: Detention River

The Detention Falls, a cascade waterfall on the Detention River, is located at Milabena in North West Tasmania, Australia.

== Location and description ==
The falls are situated about 20 km west of Wynyard, approximately 220 m above sea level, and are located within the 3.29 km^{2} Detention Falls Conservation Area at Milabena. The Detention River, its headwaters forming within the Dip Ranges, flows for about 23 km before discharging into Bass Strait. The river mouth is adjacent to the small communities of Detention and Hellyer, near Rocky Cape.

At the point of the falls, the river forms a narrow channel through the quartzite rock above, before cascading onto a series of irregular steps, into a basin within the small gorge below.

== Public access ==
The viewing platform and walking track was closed to the public following engineering advice in 2008, and the platform was subsequently removed. A hazard sign at the start of the walking track advises that the viewing area is unsafe and may collapse.

== Gallery ==
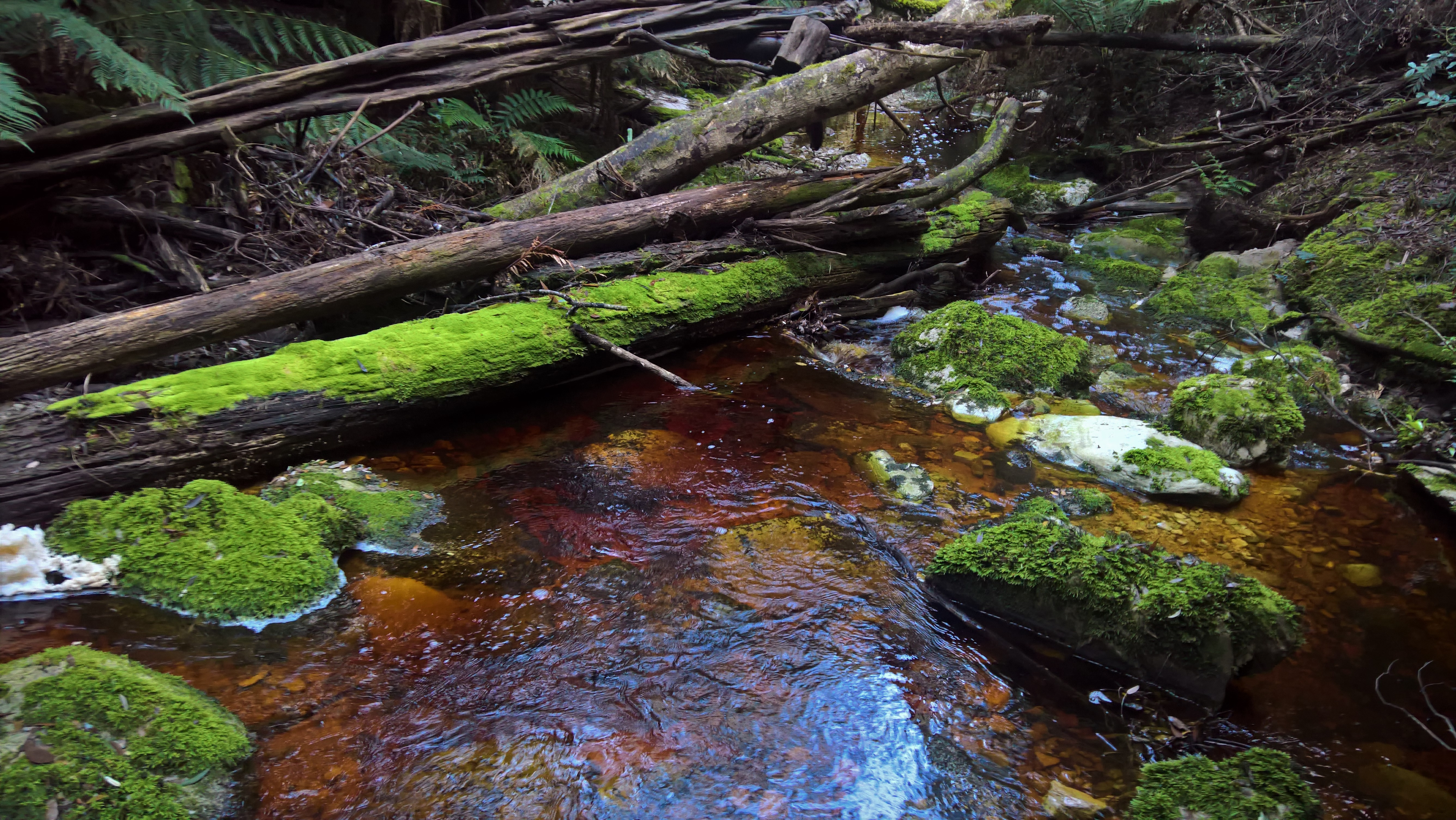
Detention River at Detention Falls Conservation Area

== See also ==
- List of waterfalls of Tasmania
- Protected areas of Tasmania
