= New South Wales Central Murray Forests =

Coordinates: 35°39′00″S 144°39′00″E

Designations

Ramsar Wetland
- Official name: NSW Central Murray State Forests
- Designated: 20 May 2003
- Reference no.: 1291

The New South Wales Central Murray Forests lie on the floodplain of the Murray River in the Riverina region of south-central New South Wales, Australia. On 20 May 2003 the forests were recognised as a wetland site of international importance (RS1291) by designation under the Ramsar Convention on Wetlands.

== Description ==
The 840 km^{2} site comprises three geographically separate, though interrelated, areas: the Murray Valley National and Regional Parks, the Werai Forests, and the Koondrook–Perricoota Forests. They contain a wide variety of wetlands including rivers, lakes, drainage channels, marshes and swamps. The site has a long history of water regulation for agriculture, as well as pastoralism and timber harvesting.

=== Flora and fauna ===
320 native plant species have been recorded in the New South Wales Murray Forests. The site is dominated by river red gum forest, with box woodland and sandhill communities, and is subject to regular flooding. Importantly, there are trees of over 200 years of age present. Moira grass plains dominated by moira grass (Pseudoraphis spinescens) are found on rises and river banks.

Threatened species include the fish Murray cod, trout cod and Murray hardyhead, the birds Australian painted snipe, Australasian bittern and superb parrot, as well as swamp wallaby grass.

The forests provide shaded water as shelter and are important spawning grounds for native fish species. Native fish such as the golden perch (Macquaria ambigua), Murray cod and silver perch (Bidyanus bidyanus) migrate as far as 300 km upstream and 900 km downstream.
