= St Helens Conservation Area =

Conservation Area in Tasmania

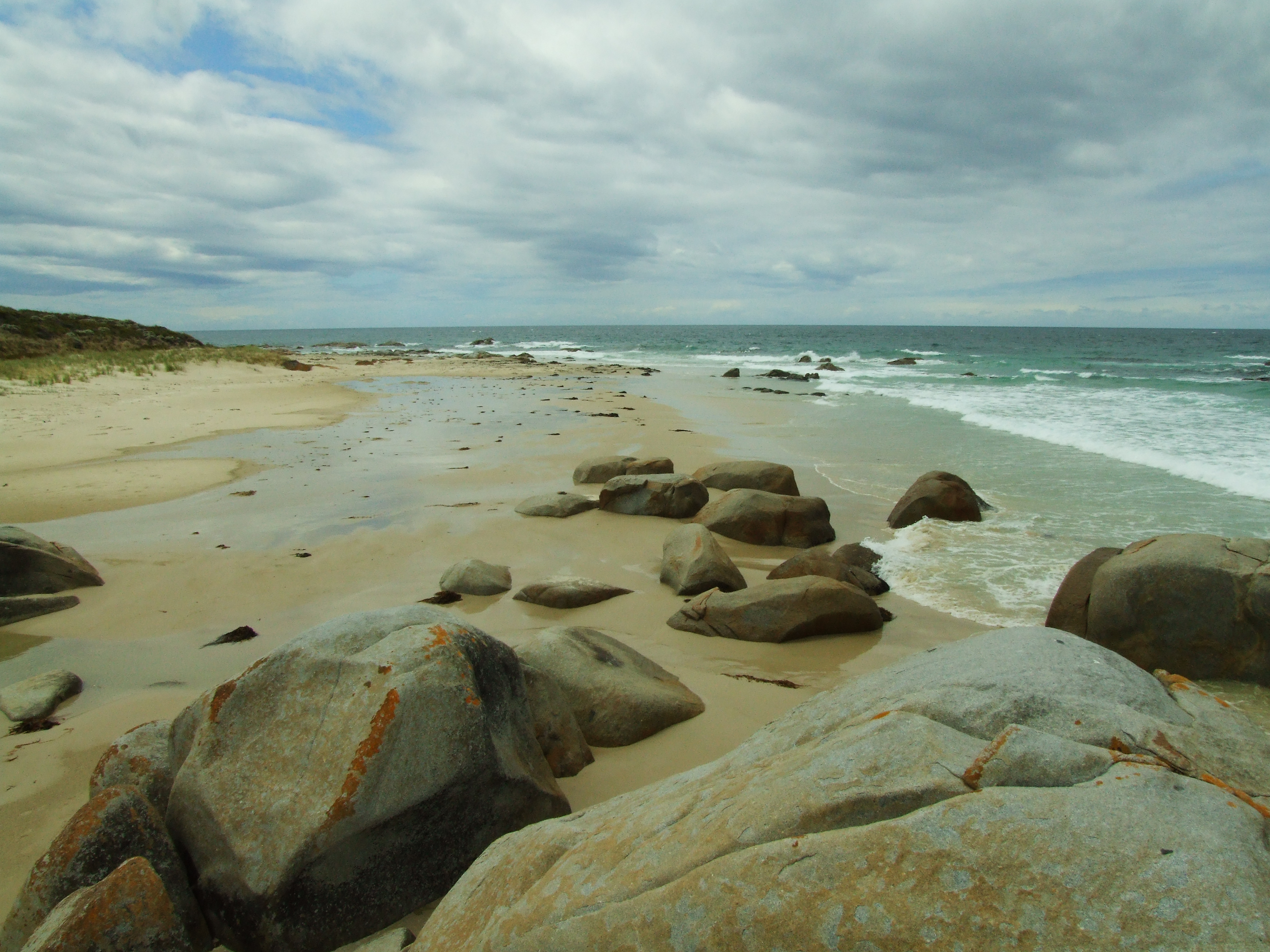
The St Helens Conservation Area on a beach

The St Helens Conservation Area is a protected area located in St Helens, Tasmania, Australia.

The St Helens Conservation Area is known for the Peron Dunes, St Helens Point, and Diana's Basin.
