= Trowutta Regional Reserve =

Coordinates: 41°05′40″S 145°01′35″E

The Trowutta Regional Reserve is a protected and natural sinkhole area in the West Coast of Tasmania.

The regional reserve is well known for the sinkhole that naturally formed in the last Ice Age years.

The regional reserve is named after the town that is near the regional reserve called Trowutta.
