= Dismal Swamp Regional Reserve =

Protected area in the West Coast of Tasmania

Coordinates: 40°57′42″S 144°50′22″E

- The slide at Dismal Swamp
- Interactive map of Dismal Swamp Regional Reserve
- Location: Togari, Tasmania
- Nearest city: Burnie (117 km/72.7 mi)
- Established: September 2004

Dismal Swamp Regional Reserve is a protected and natural sinkhole area near the Bass Highway at Togari, Tasmania, Australia. The area was well known for the slide that opened in September 2004. The area permanently closed in 2019 due to low visitors and tourists coming to the area since it is on the West Coast of Tasmania.

== History ==
The sinkhole formed thousands of years ago through the natural process of chemical weathering.

The Dismal Swamp tourist attraction opened in September 2004 under the name Tarkine Forest Adventures. The tourist attraction was well known for the 110 meter slide which caused frequent injuries to people who were using it since they picked up speeds up to 50 to 55 km/hour. In July 2005, Forestry Tasmania was forced to temporary close the slide down. About two months later, the tourist attraction reopened which they included helmets that were mandatory to wear for safety and thick-like potato sack to slow down the user who is riding the slide.

The tourist attraction permanently shut down in 2019 due to fewer visitors and tourists coming to the area, and due to maintenance and safety issues at the site. The private operator running the site refused to pay for the required structural repairs, arguing it was the responsibility of the Tasmanian Government. With neither side willing to fund the fixes, the operator walked away and handed back the keys. Prior to the closure, the tourist attraction site was abandoned and subject to vandalism and smashed glass.

In July 2024, the government announced that they would re-open the site costing AU$12.5 million. Since June 2026, the site has been under construction, repairing the slide, replacing the shattered class, and other features.
