= Rocky Cape National Park =

National park in Australia

- IUCN category II (national park)
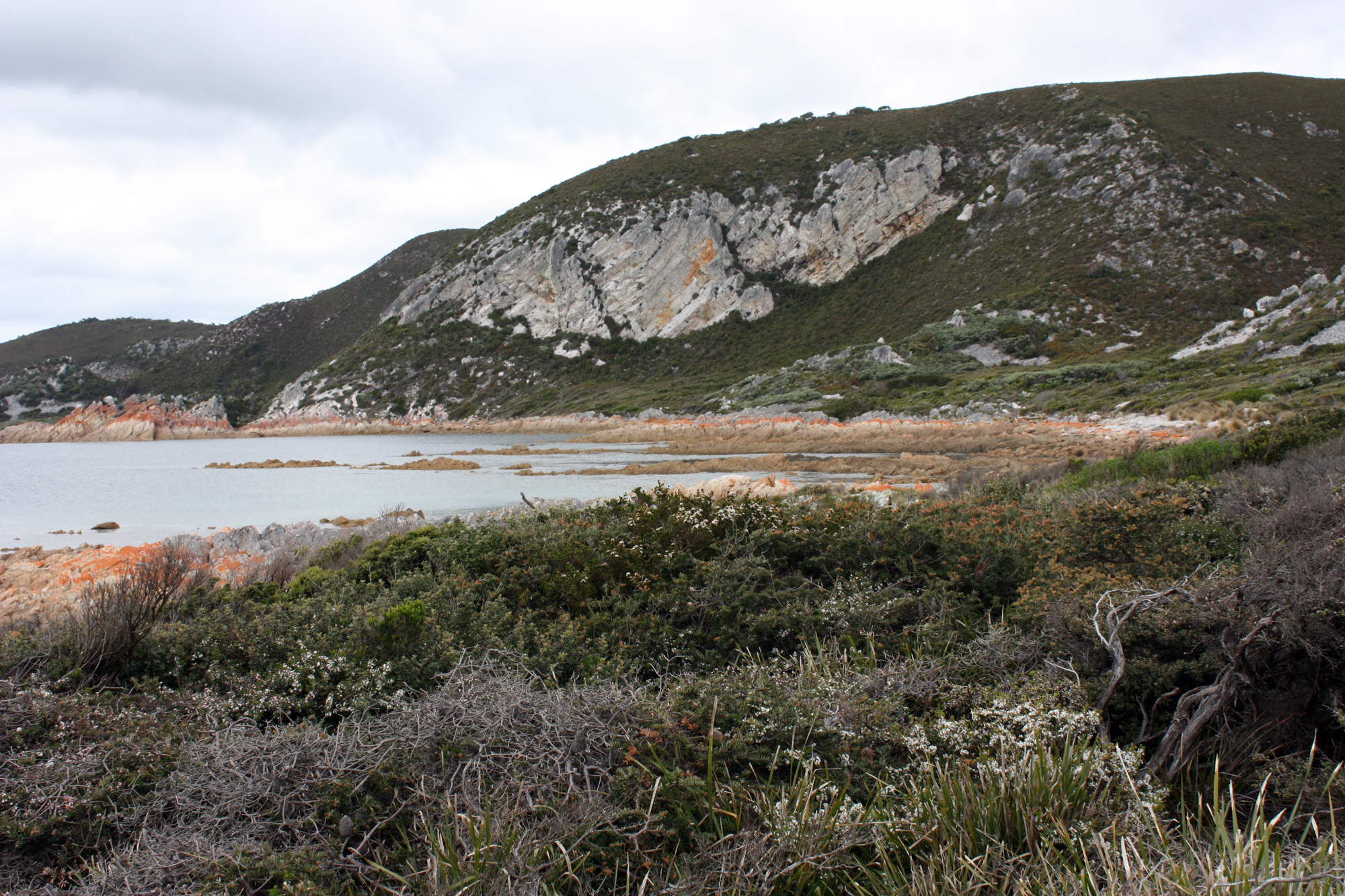
- Rocky Cape, 2009

- Location within Tasmania
- Interactive map of Rocky Cape National Park
- Location: Tasmania
- Nearest city: Wynyard, Tasmania
- Coordinates: 40°53′59″S 145°32′9″E
- Area: 30.64 km^{2} (11.83 sq mi)
- Established: 1967
- Governing body: Tasmania Parks and Wildlife Service
- Website: Official website

Rocky Cape National Park is a national park on the North West Coast of Tasmania, Australia. It is located at a geographical headland and surrounds the town of Sisters Beach. It is located approximately 365 km by car northwest of State Capital Hobart. In 2016, the official name of the cape (but not the park) was changed to pinmatik / Rocky Cape.

Evidence of Aboriginal occupation dating from 8000 years ago was found by Rhys Jones in the 1960s. The Rocky Cape Lighthouse was erected in 1968.

A research by Melbourne's Monash University found that Rocky Cape National Park is home to some rocks that are thought to be from the Grand Canyon in Arizona. It suggested that Tasmania was once connected to the West Coast of the US.

== See also ==
- Protected areas of Tasmania (Australia)
