= Spider (locomotive) =

Locomotive

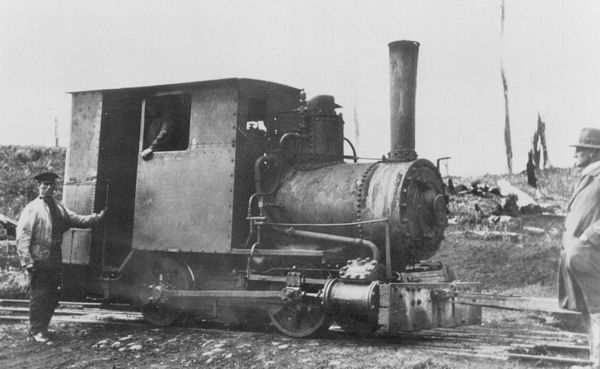
Spider locomotive on the Marrawah Tramway 1917–1923

The locomotive to become known as Spider in its service on the Marrawah Tramway, Tasmania was originally a small Baldwin-built steam tram constructed about 1890 for usage on the 4 ft 8 1/2 in gauge in Bendigo street tramway, Victoria, Australia.

== History ==
In 1911 the Marrawah Tramway Company purchased the locomotive for the Marrawah Tramway, and, when the loco had to be re-gauged from 4 ft 8 1/2 in to 3 ft 6 in gauge, the width of the firebox didn't allow the frames to be brought in sufficiently to make room for wheel flanges of normal width, so the latter were only 1/4 inches wide. When the engine first entered service it was easily distinguishable by the presence of an open-sided roof running the full length of the locomotive. On 5 February 1913 the loco hauled the first official load on the Marrawah Tramway (although timber getters J. S. Lee & Sons had likely done small timber haulage before). On that day the train set out from the 17-mile, where it loaded 9 1/2 tons of cheese and 2 tons of wool and hides from the Marrawah area; from there the train went on towards Smithton. This system continued for the next two years; each Wednesday the train left Smithton at 9 a.m., whilst at the same time the horse driver with the cargo left Marrawah. This system continued to work till the Public Works Department's takeover in 1914. When Spider passed into ownership of the Public Works Department in 1914, the locomotive was the only one that the PWD owned at the time and was considered by Mr Ford (manager of the tramway) as "our No. 1 engine", apparently meaning it in the numerical sense and in the qualitative sense of which Spider was considered the best engine the PWD owned until the arrival of "Big Ben" in 1919.

In January 1917 Spider was taken by road from Smithton to Myalla and then railed to the TGR workshops in Launceston for a general overhaul, in the course of which the original bar frames (which were cracked) were replaced with plate frames. Another clear addition was that the former open roof was removed and a sheet metal cab with a galvanised iron roof was fitted; this would have been a great improvement for the drivers. After this the locomotive weighed in at 8 1/2 tons. making it the second lightest of the four PWD engines. By the 1920s Spider's original boiler was getting badly worn out, and in April 1923 the Emu Bay Railway Company agreed to replace her boiler, and this appears to have been completed in November of that year.

In 1929 the Marrawah tramway, along with all the PWD's locomotives and rolling stock, passed into ownership of the TGR, who continued to operate them but gradually started the dispersing of the small engines and employing larger C-class 2-6-0 locomotives.

=== Head-on collision ===
On 10 February 1937 Spider crashed into one of these larger locomotives. On that day C-class 4 with driver Davidson and fireman Simon departed Smithton with a heavy load for Marrawah, C 4 after passing the 4 & 6 mile marks was given permission from Smithton to proceed but was experiencing heavy going en route, relieving officer Speers at Smithton radioed Spider, which had hauled an earlier train to head back to the 19 mile to assist C4. When C4 reached the 19 mile it phoned Smithton, but, rather than being informed to wait for Spider, Mr Speers at Smithton was otherwise engaged, so Miss Geale at Smithton, with no knowledge of the agreement, gave C 4 permission to proceed. Spider, still intending to meet C4 at the 19-mile mark, met head on with C4 at the 20-mile mark in a violent collision. C4 only received damage to the cowcatcher, buffer and vacuum brake pipe, but Spider, being the smaller engine, with no momentum from a load behind, was badly damaged, with the head-on collision tearing the boiler from supportings and lifting it up. The water tank ripped from its mountings, the underside of the smokebox being lifted up on the boiler was crunched in, and the whistle and injector steam pipes were ripped from the steam dome. The local fitter suggested the engine "was and is overdue for a thorough repair", and the loco was sent to the Launceston workshops to receive a thorough overhaul. And during this period it was tried to get Big Ben to do Spider's work, but eventually an engine of Jaegers, presumably the Manning Wardle 0-4-0 ST Stanley was used instead for a short period; by 1938 "Spider was likely back in service."

=== A second collision ===
On 8 August 1941 Spider was involved in another collision, but this time with the passenger railmotor DP 3. On that day Spider was heading out from Smithton with a load and DP 3 from Marrawah with passengers, It was intended for both engines to cross at the 19-mile mark. Driver Young on the railmotor was unable to call for clearance from Redpa and "ran the gauntlet" to the next block post to call for clearance from Redpa. Fireman Goodwin on Spider rang Smithton control from the 14-mile mark after a difficult trip. Porter O' Donnell at Smithton gave Spider clearance to the 17 mile, but in the following conversation about likely loading at various sidings neglected to tell Goodwin that he had cleared DP 3 to cross him at the 17 mile instead of the 19 mile. From here both engines were lost to the Smithton station master until a call came through that there was "a mess up the track with Spider and motor ahead at the 18 mile". Damage to both locos was extensive, but both held the rails and were towed to the 17-mile siding. The railmotors passengers got to Smithton clinging to a gang motor.

Spider survived to be the last of the PWD's original four locomotives remaining at Smithton until, on 4 April 1949, Spider was purchased by the Britton Brothers for usage on their logging tramway at Brittons Swamp, Tasmania, which was a branch of the Marrawah Tramway. Spider was moved on the back of a lorry to Brittons Swamp because by that time most of the tramway up to where the Brittons' tramway branched off was torn up. Spider was put into service hauling loads of timber to the mill assisting the aging Marshall traction engine loco the Brittons already owned, although it was not very successful, but even so it worked up until 1954, when the Brittons obtained their "Diesel No. 1", and Spider was abandoned beside the track at the Britton Brothers electric mill.

The locomotive's underframe and wheels were later separated from the locomotive and used as a log bogie on the tramway, and the boiler and cab left until in 1973, when the boiler was removed and fitted to the frames and wheels of "Six Wheeler" to create a display locomotive at the Marrawah Hall, which was dumped in the Marrawah tip in 1984.
