= South Forest =

- Town
- Coordinates: 40°53′19″S 145°14′37″E
- Country: Australia
- State: Tasmania
- Region: North-west and west
- LGA: Circular Head
- Location: 15 km (9.3 mi) E of Smithton

Government
  - State electorate: Braddon
  - Federal division: Braddon

Population
  - Total: 101 (2016 census)
- Postcode: 7330
Localities around South Forest
Forest	Forest	Black River
Smithton, Irishtown	South Forest	Black River
Irishtown	Mengha	Mawbanna

South Forest is a rural locality in the local government area (LGA) of Circular Head in the North-west and west LGA region of Tasmania. The locality is about 15 kilometres (9.3 mi) east of the town of Smithton. The 2016 census recorded a population of 101 for the state suburb of South Forest.

== History ==
South Forest was gazetted as a locality in 1973.

== Geography ==
Black River forms much of the eastern boundary.

== Road infrastructure ==
Route C219 (Mengha Road) runs through from north to south.
