= Togari, Tasmania =

Togari
- Town
- Coordinates: 40°56′19″S 144°52′42″E
- Country: Australia
- State: Tasmania
- Region: North-west and west
- LGA: Circular Head
- Location: 30 km (19 mi) SW of Smithton

Government
  - State electorate: Braddon
  - Federal division: Braddon

Population
  - Total: 97 (2016 census)
- Postcode: 7330
Localities around Togari
West Montagu	Montagu	Montagu
West Montagu, Redpa, Arthur River	Togari	Brittons Swamp, Christmas Hills, Roger River
Arthur River	West Coast	West Coast

Togari is a rural locality in the local government area (LGA) of Circular Head in the North-west and west LGA region of Tasmania. The locality is about 30 kilometres (19 mi) south-west of the town of Smithton. The 2016 census recorded a population of 97 for the state suburb of Togari.

== History ==
The locality was gazetted as Montagu Swamp in 1957, and re-gazetted as Togari in 1965. Togari had been used as a parish name since the 1890s. It is believed to be an Aboriginal word for "summit" or "crown".

The area was used as a soldier settlement.

== Geography ==
The Arthur River forms most of the southern boundary. The Montagu River flows through from east to north-west and then forms part of the western boundary.

== Road infrastructure ==
Route A2 (Bass Highway) runs through from east to west.
