= Trowutta, Tasmania =

Trowutta Tasmania
- Coordinates: 41°03′49″S 145°04′48″E
- Population: 92 (2016 census)
- Postcode(s): 7330
- Location: 29 km (18 mi) S of Smithton
- LGA(s): Circular Head
- Region: North West
- State electorate(s): Braddon
- Federal division(s): Braddon
Localities around Trowutta:
Edith Creek	Nabageena, Lileah	Lileah
Roger River	Trowutta	Lileah
Roger River	West Coast	West Coast

Trowutta is a rural locality in the local government area of Circular Head in the North West region of Tasmania. It is located about 29 kilometres (18 mi) south of the town of Smithton. The 2016 census determined a population of 92 for the state suburb of Trowutta.

== History ==
The locality was gazetted in 1962.

== Geography ==
The Arthur River forms the southern boundary and most of the eastern. The Duck River forms the northern boundary. Trowutta Arch, a tourist attraction, is in the centre of the locality.

== Road infrastructure ==
The C218 route (Trowutta Road / Reids Road / Tayatea Road) enters from the north-west and runs south and east before exiting. Route C223 (Maguires Road) starts at an intersection with route C218 and runs north-east before exiting.
