= Nabageena, Tasmania =

Nabageena Tasmania
- Coordinates: 40°59′36″S 145°07′43″E
- Population: 41 (2016 census)
- Postcode(s): 7330
- Location: 19 km (12 mi) S of Smithton
- LGA(s): Circular Head
- Region: North West
- State electorate(s): Braddon
- Federal division(s): Braddon
Localities around Nabageena:
| Edith Creek | Lileah | Lileah |
| Edith Creek | Nabageena | Lileah |
| Roger River | Trowutta | Lileah |

Nabageena is a rural locality in the local government area of Circular Head in the North West region of Tasmania. It is located about 19 kilometres (12 mi) south of the town of Smithton. The 2016 census determined a population of 41 for the state suburb of Nabageena.

== History ==
The locality was gazetted in 1973. Nabageena is the Aboriginal term for “sun”.

== Geography ==
The Duck River forms the southern boundary.

== Road infrastructure ==
The C219 route (South Road) enters from the north-east and passes through the northern part of the locality before exiting to the north-west. Route C223 (Maguires Road) starts at an intersection with route C219 and runs south, east and west before exiting to the south-west.
