= Edgcumbe Beach =

- Town
- Coordinates: 40°52′00″S 145°24′54″E
- Country: Australia
- State: Tasmania
- Region: North-west and west
- LGA: Circular Head
- Location: 31 km (19 mi) E of Smithton

Government
  - State electorate: Braddon
  - Federal division: Braddon

Population
  - Total: 54 (2016 census)
- Postcode: 7321
Localities around Edgcumbe Beach
Bass Strait	Bass Strait	Bass Strait
Crayfish Creek	Edgcumbe Beach	Hellyer
Mawbanna	Hellyer	Hellyer

Edgcumbe Beach is a rural locality in the local government area (LGA) of Circular Head in the North-west and west LGA region of Tasmania. The locality is about 31 kilometres (19 mi) east of the town of Smithton. The 2016 census recorded a population of 54 for the state suburb of Edgcumbe Beach.

== History ==
Edgcumbe Beach was gazetted as a locality in 1962. It is believed to be named for an early settler.

== Geography ==
The waters of Bass Strait form the northern boundary.

== Road infrastructure ==
Route A2 (Bass Highway) runs through from north-east to north-west.
