= Marrawah Tramway =

Coordinates: 40.9100°S 144.9666°E

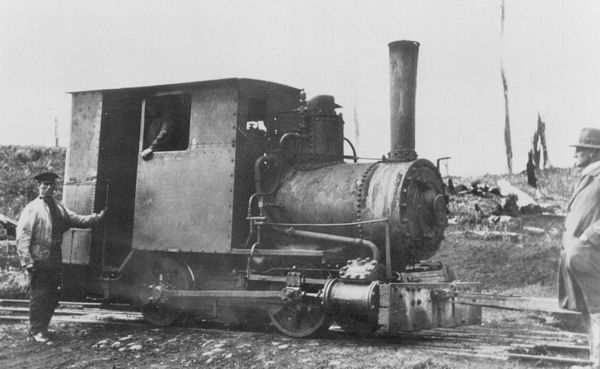
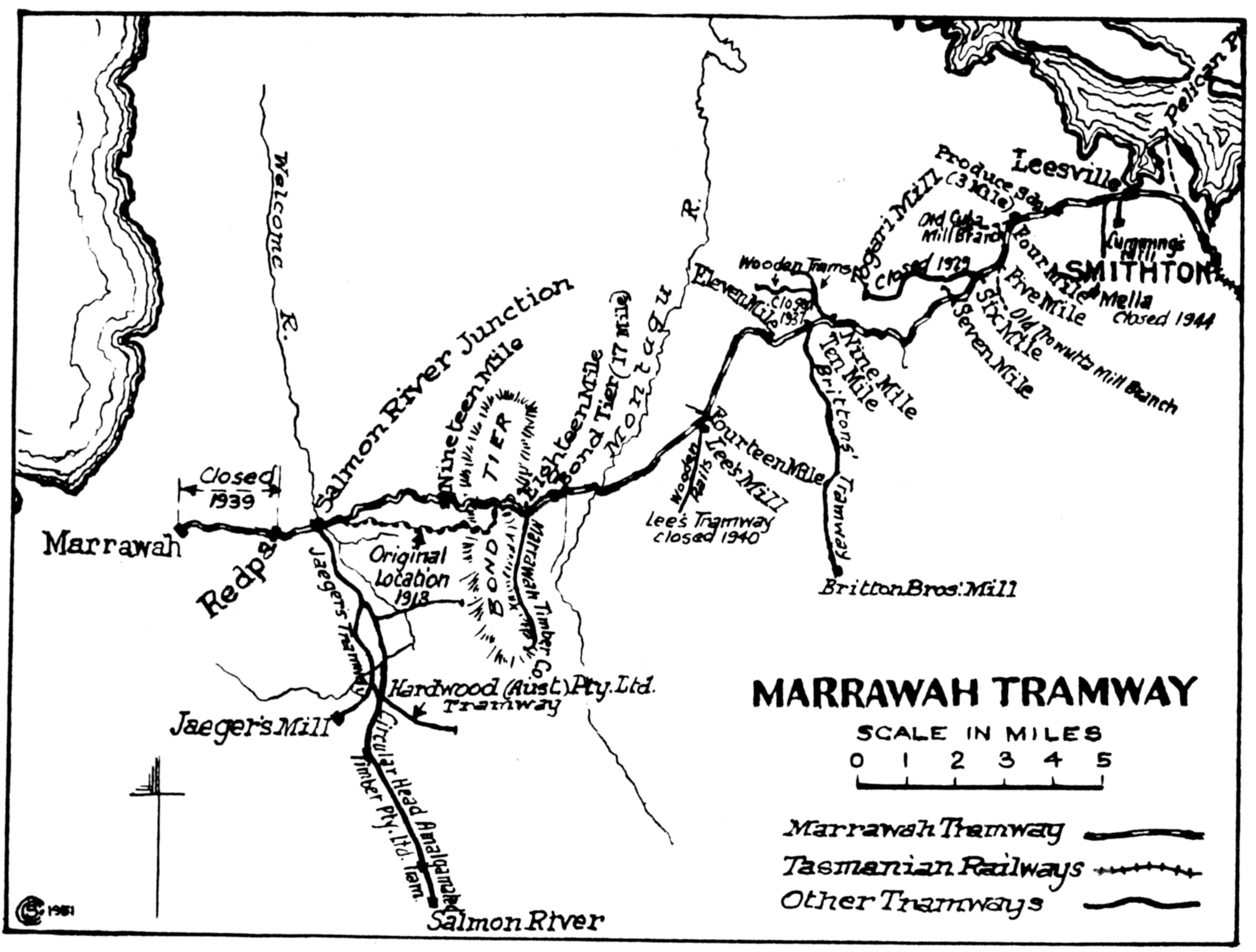
- Spider locomotive before boiler refit in 1923 The Marrawah Tramway, 1951

Technical
- Line length: 28 miles (45.1 km)
- Track gauge: 3 ft 6 in (1,067 mm)
- Operating speed: 12 miles per hour (19 km/h) max.
- Maximum incline: 1 in 40, i.e. 2.5 %

The Marrawah Tramway was a 28 miles (45.1 km) long narrow gauge forest railway near Marrawah in Tasmania with a gauge of 3 ft 6 in (1,067 mm). The construction was initiated around 1911 to harvest timber in the Mowbray Swamp. The tramway was bought by the state government in October 1913 and the steel rails extended to Marrawah. It was decommissioned in 1961.

== Early work ==
In the early 1880s, the late Mr. J. S. Lee constructed a short length of tramway from Lee's “Old Jetty” to his newly built mill at Leesville. The line was extended from the Leesville settlement to Mowbray Swamp, an expanse of unbelievably rich blackwood forest. The original tram, which was built around the edge of the swamp, turned south at what in later years became known as the Five Mile, and skirted the higher land to the west. This tram, which ultimately became a spur line of the tramway, was later extended through Christmas Hills to the Roger River flats. For the most of its length wooden rails were used. A locomotive, “The Gadget,” handled the traffic to and from the Trowutta mill delivering its loads to the main line at the Five Mile. "The Gadget” was fitted with wide wheels for use on the wooden rails, and its usual load was about three trucks of timber.

A company was formed during the early part of 1906 to construct a wooden tramway from Marrawah to Montagu, but as only 1,700 shares were applied for out of a total of 4650 pieces of £1 shares that was required, the project fell through. Representations were then made to the company by Messrs. J. S. Lee and Sons with the view of building the line to Smithton instead of Montagu. As they had some six miles already constructed towards Marrawah, and substantial help was also promised by the people of Smithton and district, the directors decided to go in with them and build the line. A Bill was passed by Parliament at the end of the year giving the company power to construct, also a lease of 5,000 acres of timber.

The directors then started in earnest to fix up an agreement with Messrs. J. S. Lee and Sons, but this was not signed until November 1909. During this time a further ease of 5,000 acres of timber was sanctioned by Parliament to enable the company to give enough security to J. S. Lee and Sons for their financial assistance. Only about 2,500 shares were applied for by the public, which was very disappointing to the directors; but they, knowing how urgent it was for Marrawah needs to have an outlet, decided to go on, hoping that the landholders of Marrawah would recognise their own interest in the matter and help to bring the undertaking to a successful issue.

During 1907 and 1908 three miles of iron rails were bought in Victoria and laid on the end of the six miles built by Lee. The directors then decided not to spend any further money until the agreement with Lee and Sons was finally settled, which was in November 1908. Four and a half miles of rails were then bought in England, and construction started again, but owing to the failure to procure the necessary dog-spikes on account of the late coal strike, only 1¼ miles were laid; the forming was carried on for another two miles, and then the wet weather set in.

At the annual meeting of the company at Marrawah on 19 July 1908, Mr. A. W. Ford, chairman of directors, stated that work had been going along steadily on various sections of the line. Surveying had been completed and clearing finished throughout. Iron rails had almost reached the eight mile peg from Smithton.

== Construction ==
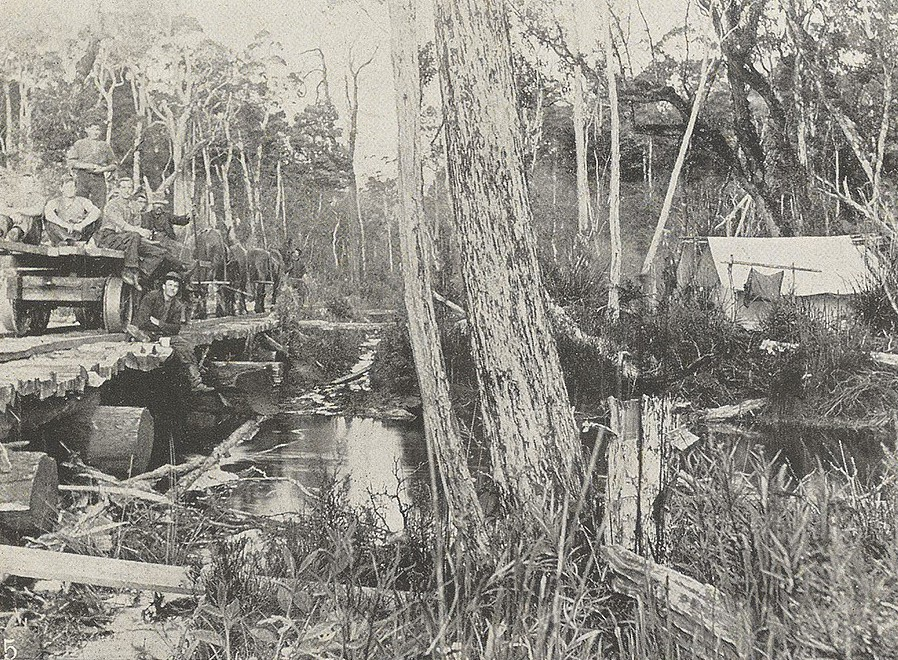
Bridging the Welcome River, 1913

The first sod of the new line was turned by the Governor, Sir Harry Barron, at Stanley on 4 May 1911. After the winter break the work resumed in August 1911. Iron rails for the line and a new locomotive were delivered by November 1911. At the annual meeting of the Tramway Co., held on 22 February 1912, Mr. Geo Allen was elected a director, at a time when F. F. Ford, the founder and also the largest shareholder in the company, had just died.

By this time, the line had been laid as far as the 13½ mile peg, and the formation completed to the Montagu River, 15½ miles out. It was well-laid with 30 and 40lb. rails, and sleepers not more than one foot apart in most cases, so that it could carry loads of up to 70 tons. The grades were less than 1 in 40 (25 ‰). The section from the 19 mile to the 22½ mile peg was also ready for the laying of the wooden rails, and it was anticipated that the line would be at Marrawah by the end of the year.

== Rolling stock ==
In October 1911 a steam engine Spider was landed by Lee and Sons, and rented to the company. The rolling stock consisted of three 8 wheeled bogey trucks and twelve four wheeled ballast and produce trucks were under way, and the company was negotiating for the purchase of a twelve ton Climax geared locomotive at a cost of £1,000.

The B+ Class 4-4-0 steam locomotive No B+ 1 built by Hunslet & Co in Leeds was since 1884 used by the Tasmanian Main Line Company. In 1922 it went to the Myalla-Wiltshire line until it was transferred to the Marrawah Tramway in July 1922, where it was used until 1927. It was scrapped in 1929.

== Inauguration ==
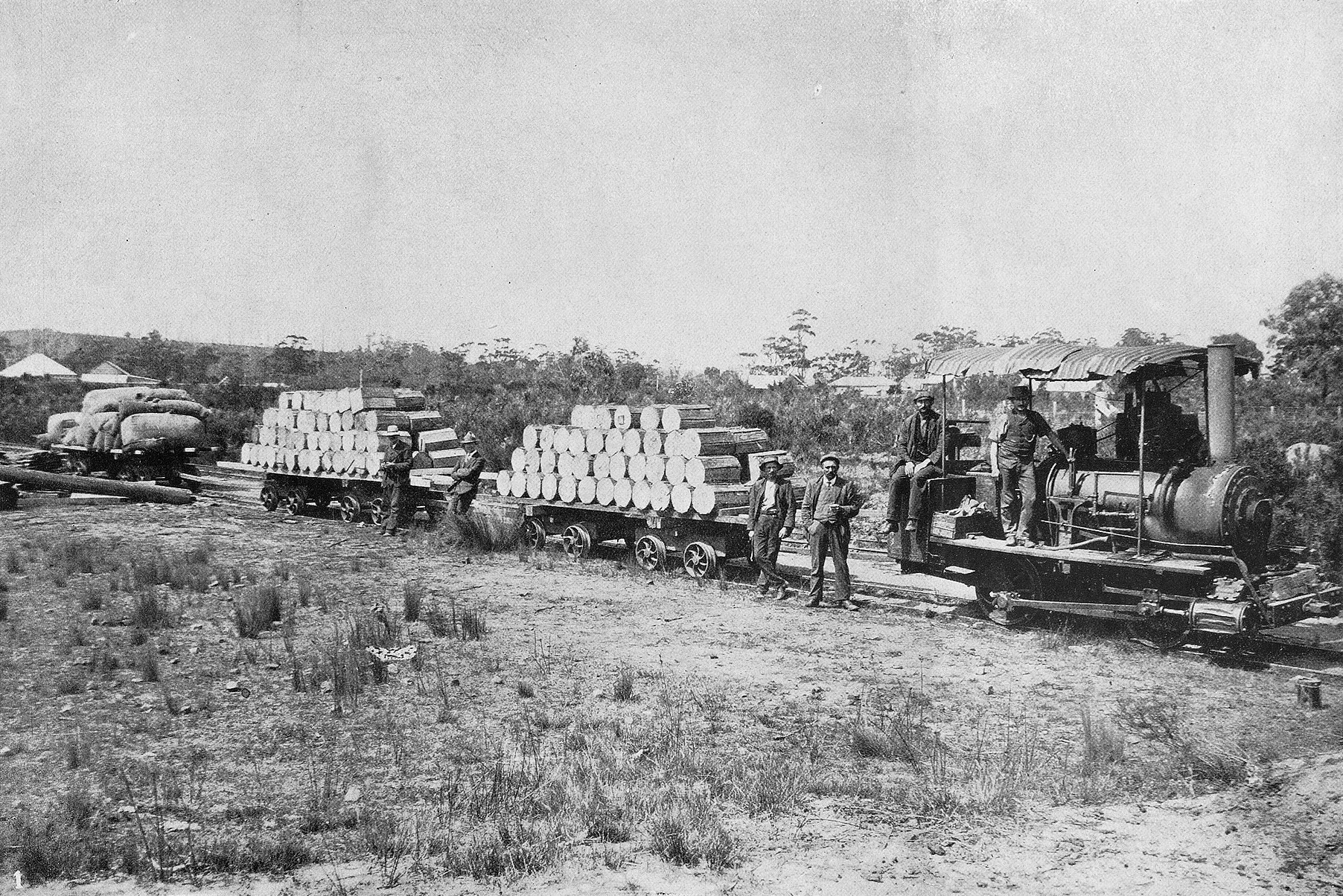
First tramload of cheese, butter and wool to Smithton on the Marrawah tramway

Early in February 1913 the tram had progressed so much that it could be used for freight transport, and by the first week in February a weekly service was commenced. The first regular rail service between Smithton and Marrawah started on 5 February 1913. The tram ran once a week, on Wednesdays, for freight and passengers, but from the 17 mile peg the journey was made by horse tram. Goods and passengers had to be transferred at this point. The estimated cost of the tram was £259,592, at an average cost of £2,998 per mile.

The tram left Smithton at 9 a.m. every Wednesday for the 17 mile and at the same hour the horse tram left Marrawah to connect with the steam tram at this point, Photos are still in existence of the first big consignment of cheese forwarded on the train on Wednesday, 5 February 1913, It totalled 9 tons from Messrs Moore's and Gale's factories. Also carried on the train that day were two tons of wool, skins and hides from various owners. The cheese was forwarded to Melbourne via Smithon per the ketch Eliza Davies, and the other items through Stanley for despatch to Launceston.

The company undertook the haulage of timber for Lee and Sons on all the section of tram above the 7½ mile peg. Britton Bros., wooden line, approximately 1½ miles in length, linked up with the tram at the 9½ mile peg, and in November 1911 the first consignment of timber from their Xmas Hills mill was hauled to Pelican Point Jetty for shipment to the mainland.

== Operation ==
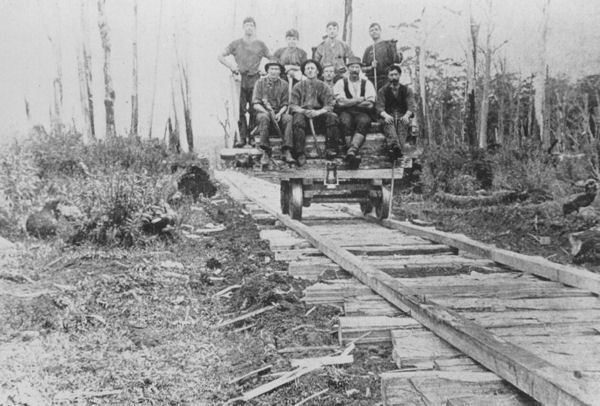
Nine Marrawah Tramway employees on a trolley on the wooden tramline section near Marrawah, where wooden rails were used, 1931

A trip on the tramway, before the wooden rails at the section close to Marrawah had been replaced by steel rails, was described by an eye witness as follows:

"Descending the “Kick” the trucks rattle round several sharp curves, all the time on the down grade, and through cuttings and sidings, to the nine mile, where Britton's tram from Christmas Hills meets the main line. Then across the flat swampy area past the fourteen mile mill and so on to the seventeen mile, where the steel rails end. Goods and passengers are transferred to the Horse Tram, under the charge of Mr. T. Marshall, and the final stage of the journey is entered upon, through cuttings so close that the driver has only to reach out to snatch a stone to throw at a laggard horse, and thence on to the farm country towards our goal at Marrawah."

== Accidents ==
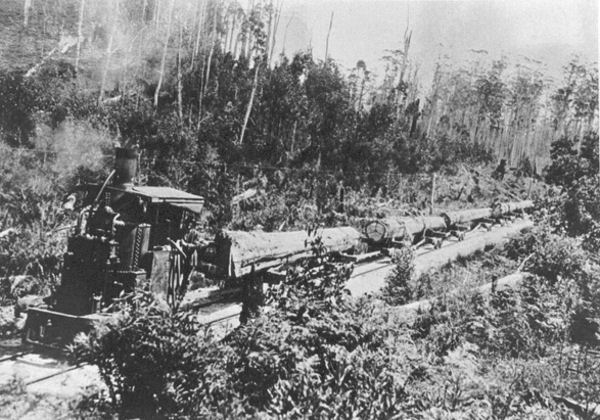
The vertical boilered steam engine Coffee Pot hauling logs

A description of derailings gives an idea of the working conditions on the tramway at this period. The ground was soft, and the tram laid to carry slow traffic, and with a zealous eye to expense. At an inquest held in Smithton on Arthur McMahon, bush foreman for Lee & Sons, Crawford Cure, the driver of the Coffee Pot said that he was proceeding to Leesville with a load of eight logs when an axle broke. As it was late, the loco returned to the station without the load. Next morning the logs on the derailed truck were jacked up off the damaged bogey, the two logs being suspended on a six inch bearer. Another pair of wheels and axle were to be run under and the damaged ones removed.

McMahon had just removed the pin from the bolster, when the load slipped, and he was pinned against a blackwood stump beside the line. He was dead when released by Cure, who single-handed jacked the logs clear of his body. These derailments were common occurrences, and under ordinary circumstances the loads were jacked on in from twenty minutes to half an hour. The driver was usually unaccompanied on the trip, doing his own fireing and replacing his loads on the rails in cases of derailments.

== Branches ==
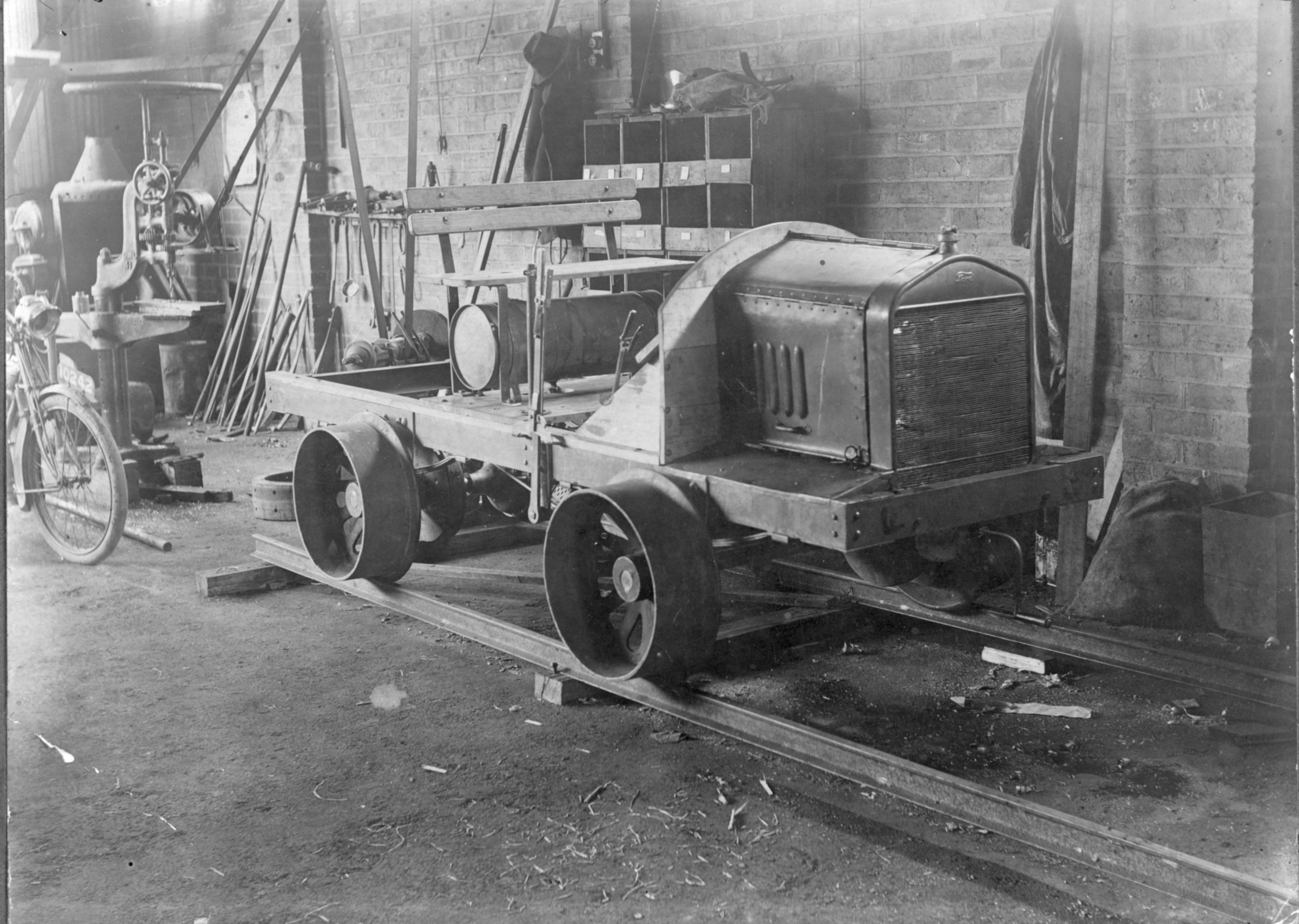
Ford Model T converted into rail motor. With the wide wheel flanges it could travel both on wooden and steel rails.

Several timber tramways branched-off from the Marrawah Tramway into the Montagu, Brittons, Arthur River and Welcome. The Marrawah Tramway served the dolomite Mowbray and Montagu Swamps on its journey from Smithton to Marrawah. Brittons’ branch tramway went through Brittons Swamp.

Brittons’ line linked their mill to the 9¼-mile mark of the Marrawah Tramway. The 3’6”-gauge Britton Tramway cost about £2,000, a significant investment at the time. It originally used white myrtle spars for stringers, and was closely corded and ballasted with sawdust so that the five-horse teams could haul the trucks with up to two pieces of sawn timber without tripping. After a few years, heavy, long hardwood stringers replaced the white myrtle ones, and iron rails were placed on the outside bends. Twelve loading ramps enabled twenty-four loads of timber to be left at the junction with the Marrawah Tramway. The timber was then delivered to the Pelican Point jetty at the Duck River heads, where it was loaded on ships bound for Melbourne or Adelaide. In the winter of 1919, for instance, Brittons milled about 8,000 super feet (24 cubic metres) of logs per day. Brittons also had a Ford Model T converted into a rail motor by Arthur Schmidt of Burnie.

== Nationalisation ==
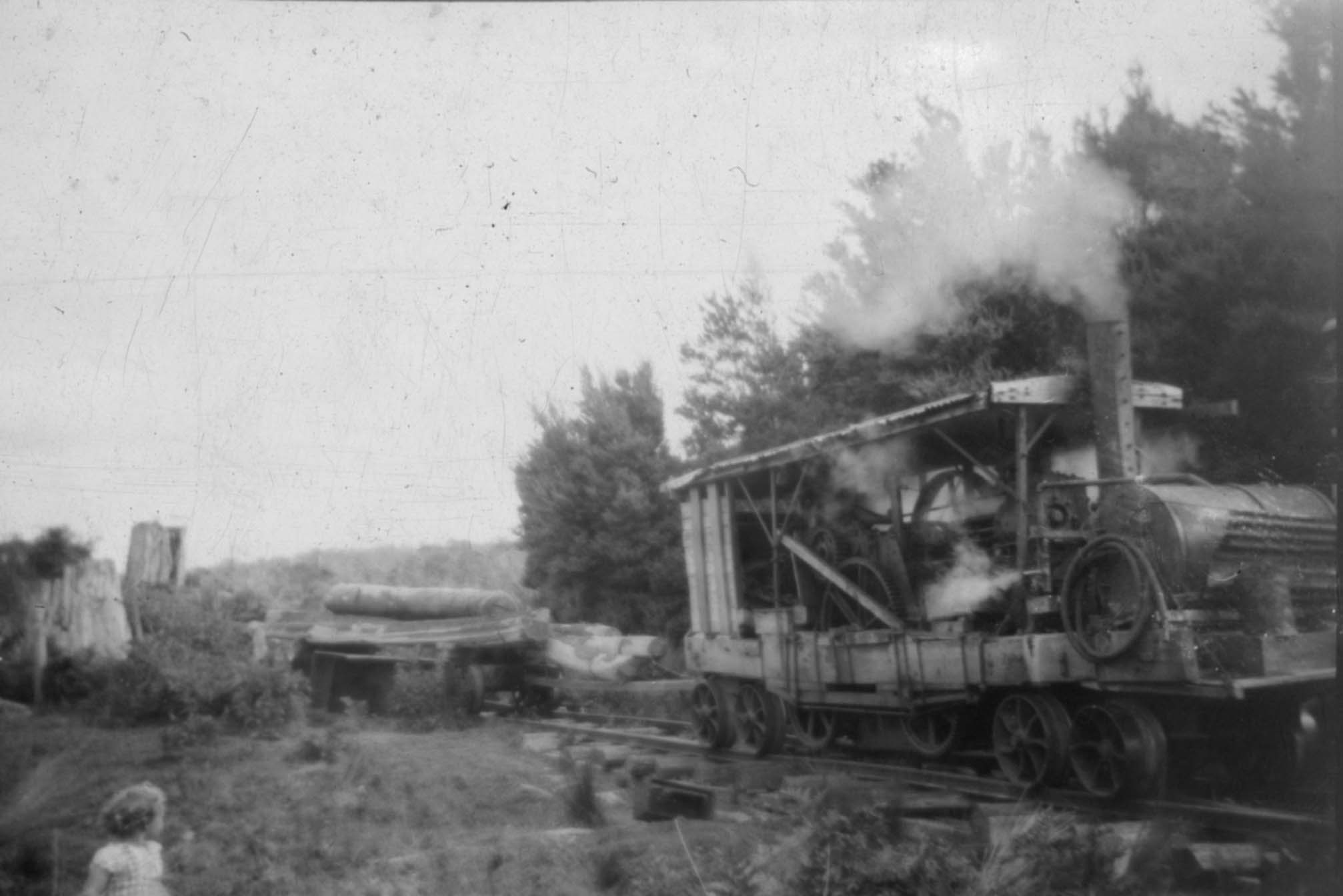
The Marshall loco hauling a load of blackwood

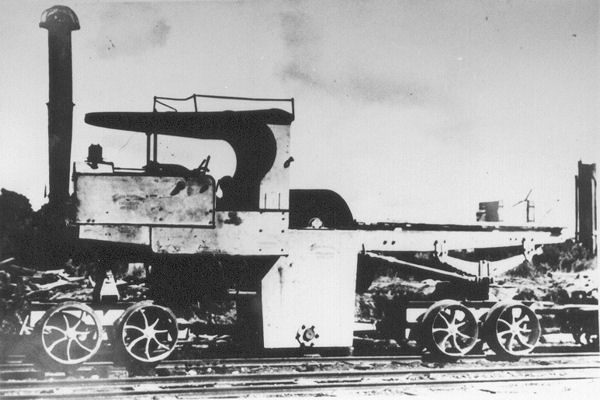
Harlot, a converted Ransomes steam lorry

The main line was bought for £21,500 around October 1913, and since that time further sums have been spent in repairs, bringing the total outlay to £30,000. In October 1915 the Public Works Committee reported to the Tasmanian House of Assembly that the line was in a very bad state, and was not safe for the conveyance of passengers. Accordingly, it recommended the expenditure of £12,000 to repair the old metal rails of the 17 miles (27 km) long section near Smithton with new steel rails, and an additional £75,000 to replace the length of wooden line, which made up the remainder, with steel rails.

On one day in November 1921 no less than 71 trucks were in commission at the one time, and were hauled on the one day. They were all unloaded next morning before the locomotives left the station. In the four years from 1916 to 1920, the railway's income from the timber industry had doubled, while produce from Marrawah has gone up one-third:

Year	Timber transport	Produce from Marrawah
1916	£2000	£700
1920	£4000	£1000

A gala day was held on 15 June 1922 at Marrawah on the occasion of the opening of the steel railway line to within a mile of the township. The branches, however, stayed private property and were operated by the proprietors with their own, sometimes unusual rolling stock. One of the most peculiar locomotives was Harlot a converted Ransomes, Sims & Jefferies steam lorry. Special permission had to be given to drive it to Salmon River on the Marrawah Tramway and extra care was taken due to the type of wheels on the engine but it reached its destination without any serious damage. The journey took a whole day.

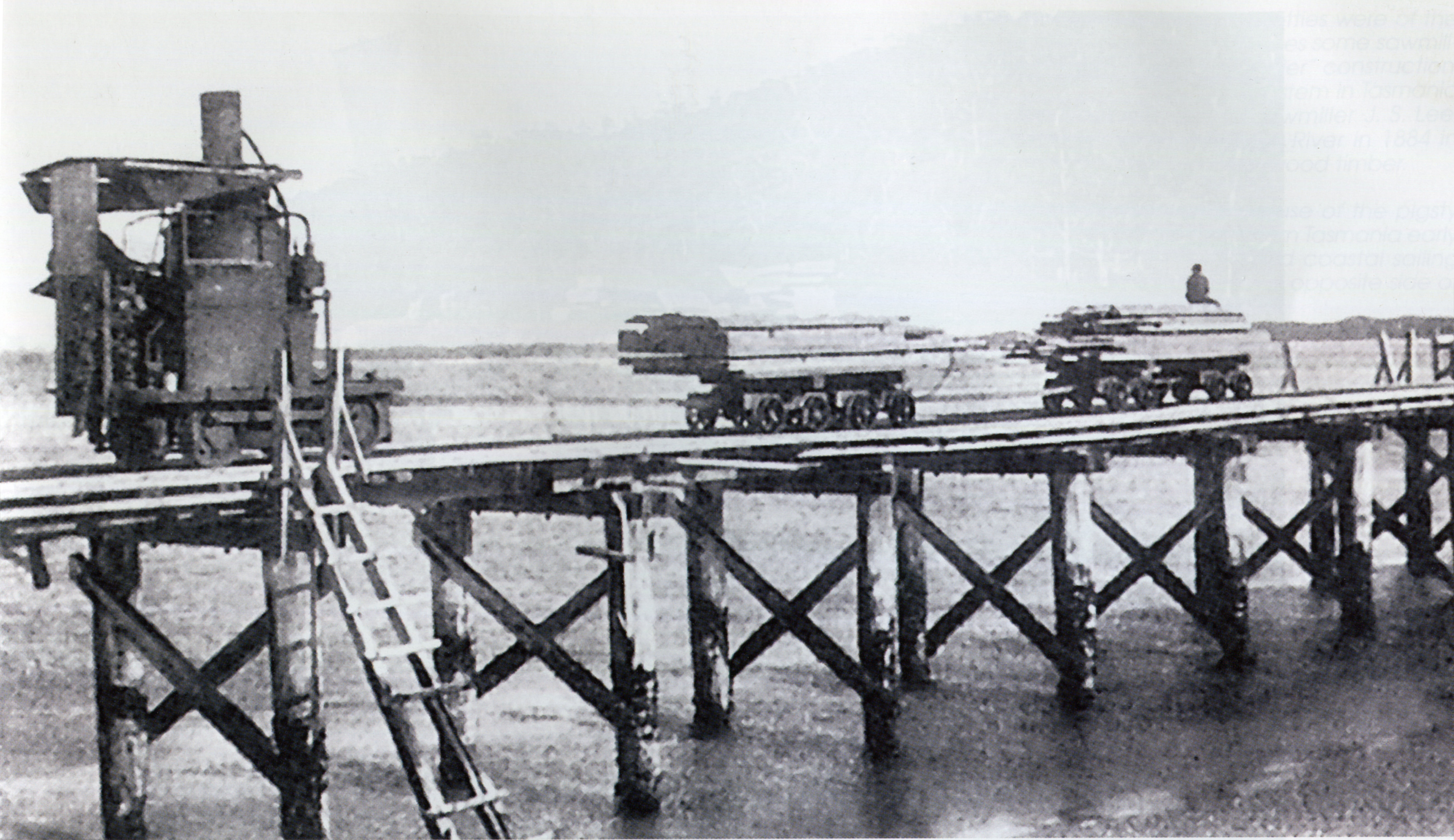
The jetty at Smithton

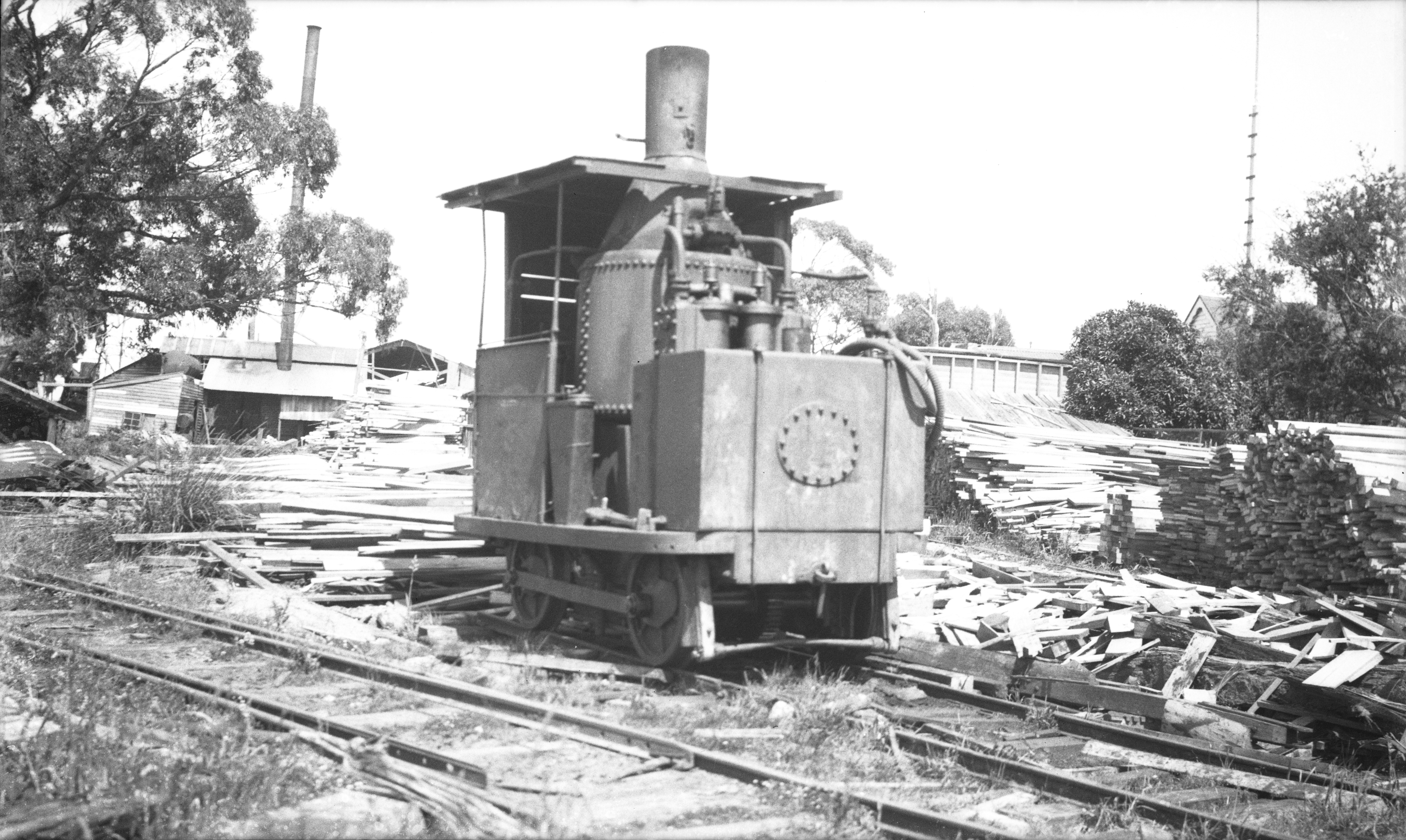
Coffee Pot at Leesville

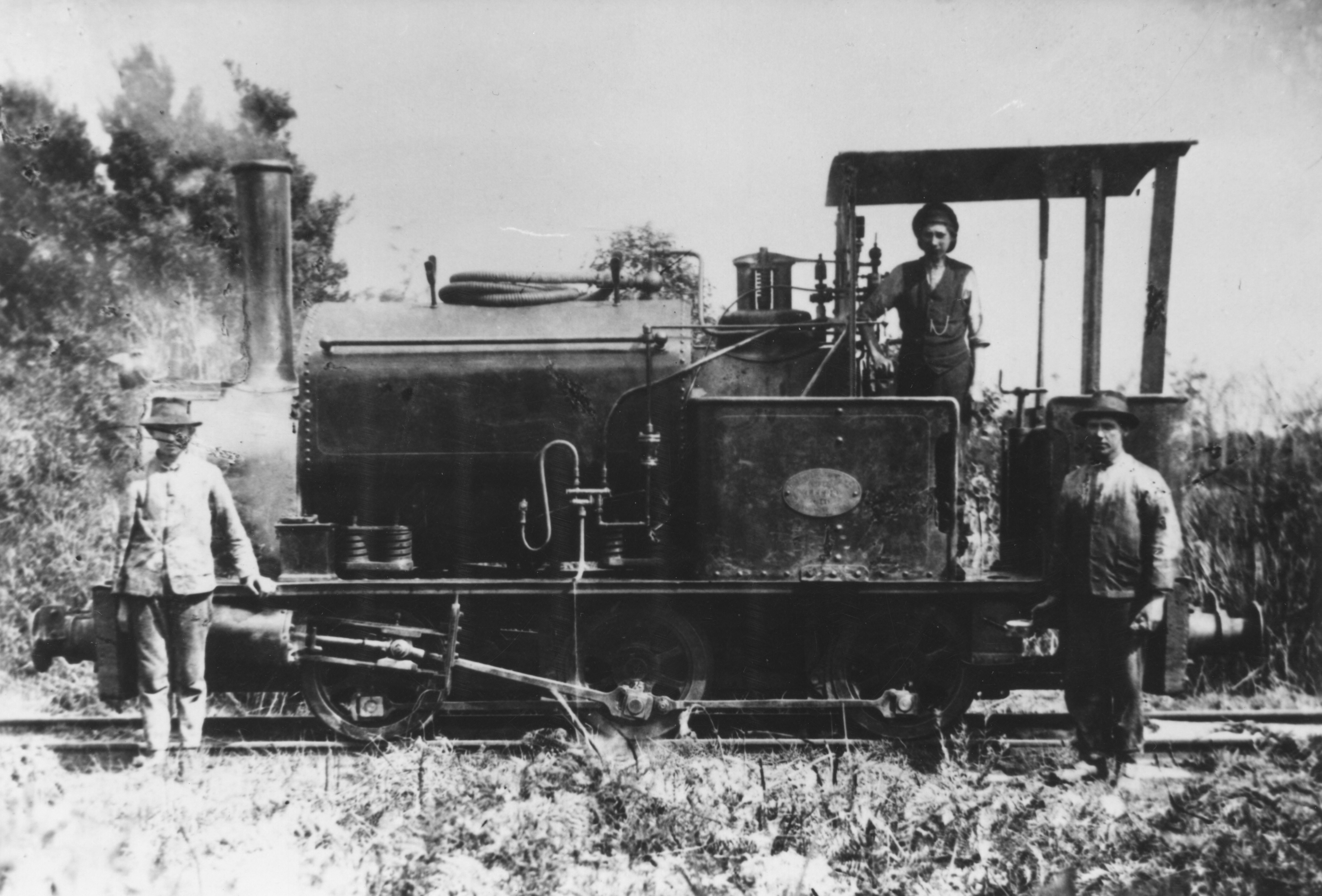
Six Wheeler

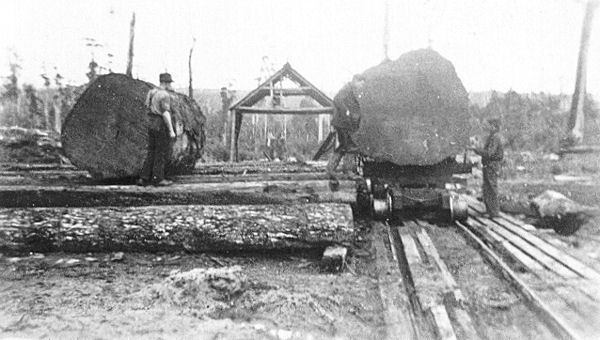
Jaeger's Mill, Redpa

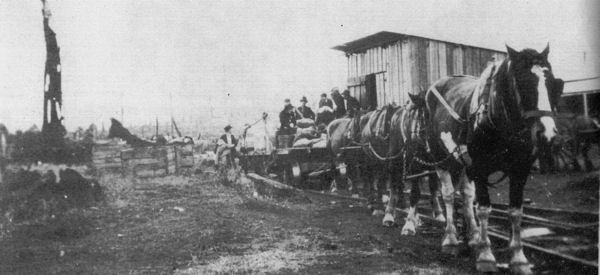
Horse-drawn tram at Redpa Station

== See also ==
- Spider (locomotive)
- Big Ben (locomotive)
