= Scotchtown, Tasmania =

Scotchtown Tasmania
- Coordinates: 40°53′50″S 145°07′09″E
- Population: 254 (2016 census)
- Postcode(s): 7330
- Location: 6 km (4 mi) S of Smithton
- LGA(s): Circular Head
- Region: North West
- State electorate(s): Braddon
- Federal division(s): Braddon
Localities around Scotchtown:
| Smithton | Smithton | Smithton |
| Christmas Hills | Scotchtown | Irishtown |
| Edith Creek | Edith Creek | Irishtown |

Scotchtown is a rural locality and town in the local government area of Circular Head in the North West region of Tasmania. It is located about 6 kilometres (3.7 mi) south of the town of Smithton. The 2016 census determined a population of 254 for the state suburb of Scotchtown.

== History ==
The locality was gazetted in 1973. As of May 2001, it is an officially named unbounded locality.

== Geography ==
The Duck River flows through from south to north, and forms much of the western boundary.

== Road infrastructure ==
The C218 route (Trowutta Road / Reids Road / Tayatea Road) enters from the north-west and runs south and east before exiting. Route C223 (Maguires Road) starts at an intersection with route C218 and runs north-east before exiting.
