= Irishtown, Tasmania =

Irishtown Tasmania
- Coordinates: 40°54′03″S 145°09′35″E
- Population: 301 (2016 census)
- Postcode(s): 7330
- Location: 8 km (5 mi) SE of Smithton
- LGA(s): Circular Head
- Region: North West Tasmania
- State electorate(s): Braddon
- Federal division(s): Braddon
Localities around Irishtown:
Scotchtown	Smithton	Mengha
Scotchtown	Irishtown	Alcomie
Edith Creek	Lileah	Lileah

Irishtown is a locality and small rural community in the local government area of Circular Head, in the North West region of Tasmania. It is located about 8 kilometres (5.0 mi) south-east of the town of Smithton. The 2016 census determined a population of 301 for the state suburb of Irishtown.

== History ==
The original name of the locality may have been “Upper Duck River”. The current name was confirmed in 1972. Note that while Duck River does not flow through the locality several of its tributaries do.

== Road infrastructure ==
The B22 route (Irishtown Road) runs from the Bass Highway through the locality, providing access to areas further south.
