= West Montagu =

- Town
- Coordinates: 40°47′07″S 144°53′31″E
- Country: Australia
- State: Tasmania
- Region: North-west and west
- LGA: Circular Head
- Location: 25 km (16 mi) NW of Smithton

Government
  - State electorate: Braddon
  - Federal division: Braddon

Population
  - Total: 45 (2016 census)
- Postcode: 7330
Localities around West Montagu
Robbins Passage	Robbins Passage	Montagu
Woolnorth, Marrawah	West Montagu	Montagu, Togari
Redpa	Redpa	Togari

West Montagu is a rural locality in the local government area (LGA) of Circular Head in the North-west and west LGA region of Tasmania. The locality is about 25 kilometres (16 mi) north-west of the town of Smithton. The 2016 census recorded a population of 45 for the state suburb of West Montagu.

== History ==
West Montagu was gazetted as a locality in 1973.

== Geography ==
The waters of Robbins Passage, an inlet of Bass Strait, form the northern boundary, and the Montagu River forms the eastern.

== Road infrastructure ==
Route C215 (Montagu Road) runs through from east to west.
