= Hellyer, Tasmania =

Hellyer
- Town
- Coordinates: 40°53′01″S 145°25′46″E
- Country: Australia
- State: Tasmania
- Region: North-west and west
- LGA: Circular Head
- Location: 35 km (22 mi) E of Smithton

Government
  - State electorate: Braddon
  - Federal division: Braddon

Population
  - Total: 173 (2016 census)
- Postcode: 7321
Localities around Hellyer
Edgcumbe Beach	Bass Strait	Bass Strait
Edgcumbe Beach, Mawbanna	Hellyer	Detention, Rocky Cape
Mawbanna	Rocky Cape	Rocky Cape

Hellyer is a rural locality in the local government area (LGA) of Circular Head in the North-west and west LGA region of Tasmania. The locality is about 35 kilometres (22 mi) east of the town of Smithton. The 2016 census recorded a population of 173 for the state suburb of Hellyer.

== History ==
Hellyer was gazetted as a locality in 1962. It was named for Henry Hellyer, a surveyor of Tasmania in the 1820s.

== Geography ==
The waters of Bass Strait form the northern boundary, and the Detention River forms much of the eastern. A closed section of the Western Railway Line follows part of the southern boundary.

== Road infrastructure ==
Route A2 (Bass Highway) runs through from east to north-west.
