= Cowrie Point =

- Town
- Coordinates: 40°51′16″S 145°21′53″E
- Country: Australia
- State: Tasmania
- Region: North-west and west
- LGA: Circular Head
- Location: 26 km (16 mi) E of Smithton

Government
  - State electorate: Braddon
  - Federal division: Braddon

Population
  - Total: 14 (2016 census)
- Postcode: 7321
Localities around Cowrie Point
Bass Strait	Bass Strait	Bass Strait
Black River	Cowrie Point	Port Latta
Black River	Black River	Mawbanna

Cowrie Point is a rural locality in the local government area (LGA) of Circular Head in the North-west and west LGA region of the island state of Tasmania, Australia. The locality is about 26 kilometres (16 mi) east of the town of Smithton. The 2016 census recorded a population of 14 for the state suburb of Cowrie Point.

== History ==
Cowrie Point was gazetted as a locality in 1962.

Originally called Cowrie Point (after the geographical feature) it was proposed in 1965 that the settlement be renamed Brickmakers Bay (after another nearby geographical feature) but this was not accepted.

== Geography ==
The waters of Bass Strait form most of the northern boundary.

== Road infrastructure ==
Route A2 (Bass Highway) runs through from north-east to north-west.
