= Black River, Tasmania =

Black River
- Town
- Coordinates: 40°51′43″S 145°19′37″E
- Country: Australia
- State: Tasmania
- Region: North West Tasmania
- LGA: Circular Head
- Location: 46 km (29 mi) NW of Wynyard

Government
  - State electorate: Braddon
  - Federal division: Braddon

Population
  - Total: 35 (2016 census)
- Postcode: 7321
Localities around Black River
| Wiltshire | Bass Strait | Cowrie Point |
| Forest | Black River | Mawbanna |
| South Forest | Mawbanna | Mawbanna |

Black River is a locality and small rural community in the local government area of Circular Head, in the North West region of Tasmania. It is located about 46 kilometres (29 mi) north-west of the town of Wynyard. Bass Strait forms most of the northern boundary, while the stream named “Black River” forms the western boundary. The 2016 census determined a population of 35 for the state suburb of Black River.

== History ==
The locality name may have originally been "Blackwall", but the current name has been in use since about 1878. It is likely that the locality was named for the adjacent river.

== Road infrastructure ==
The C225 route (Mawbanna Road) intersects with the Bass Highway in the locality, passing through to the south-east on its way to Mawbanna.

== Notable people ==
- Fergus Medwin, Australian politician
