= Lileah, Tasmania =

Lileah Tasmania
- Coordinates: 40°57′31″S 145°10′47″E
- Population: 77 (2016 census)
- Postcode(s): 7330
- Location: 17 km (11 mi) S of Smithton
- LGA(s): Circular Head
- Region: North-west and west
- State electorate(s): Braddon
- Federal division(s): Braddon
Localities around Lileah:
Irishtown	Alcomie, Irishtown	Alcomie
Trowutta, Edith Creek	Lileah	Mawbanna
Nabageena, Trowutta	Nabageena, West Coast	West Coast

Lileah is a rural locality in the local government area (LGA) of Circular Head in the North-west and west LGA region of Tasmania. The locality is about 17 kilometres (11 mi) south of the town of Smithton. The 2016 census recorded a population of 77 for the state suburb of Lileah.

== History ==
Lileah was gazetted as a locality in 1973. Lileah is believed to be an Aboriginal word meaning “fresh water”.

The settlement name was taken from Mount Lileah, which is in the locality.

== Geography ==
The Arthur River forms part of the southern boundary.

== Road infrastructure ==
Route C219 (South Road) runs through from north to west.
