= Roger River =

- Town
- Coordinates: 41°01′51″S 145°01′29″E
- Country: Australia
- State: Tasmania
- Region: North West
- LGA: Circular Head
- Location: 24 km (15 mi) SW of Smithton

Government
  - State electorate: Braddon
  - Federal division: Braddon
- Elevation: 344 m (1,129 ft)

Population
  - Total: 59 (2016 census)
- Postcode: 7330
- Mean max temp: 15.6 °C (60.1 °F)
- Mean min temp: 7.6 °C (45.7 °F)
- Annual rainfall: 1,494.6 mm (58.84 in)
Localities around Roger River
| Christmas Hills | Edith Creek | Nabageena |
| Christmas Hills | Roger River | Trowutta |
| West Coast | West Coast | West Coast |

Roger River is a rural locality in the local government area of Circular Head in the North West region of Tasmania. It is located about 24 kilometres (15 mi) south-west of the town of Smithton. The 2016 census determined a population of 59 for the state suburb of Roger River.

== History ==
The locality was originally gazetted as Roger River in 1962. In 1978 it was re-gazetted as Rogerton, but five months later it was again re-gazetted as Roger River.

== Geography ==
The Arthur River passes through from south-east to south-west, and then forms part of the south-western boundary. The Duck River passes through from the north-east to the north-west.

=== Climate ===
Roger River experiences a wet oceanic climate (Köppen: Cfb) with very mild, drier summers and cool, very drizzly winters. The wettest recorded day was 21 July 2000 with 67.0 mm (2.64 in) of rainfall. Extreme temperatures ranged from 35.4 °C (95.7 °F) on 30 January 2009 to −1.6 °C (29.1 °F) on 30 May 1999 and 11 June 1999.

Climate data was sourced from the nearest weather station at Luncheon Hill.

Climate data for Luncheon Hill (41.15°S 145.15°E) (344 m (1,129 ft) AMSL) (1989-2025)
| Month | Jan | Feb | Mar | Apr | May | Jun | Jul | Aug | Sep | Oct | Nov | Dec | Year |
|---|---|---|---|---|---|---|---|---|---|---|---|---|---|
| Record high °C (°F) | 35.4 (95.7) | 33.2 (91.8) | 32.9 (91.2) | 26.3 (79.3) | 21.5 (70.7) | 18.1 (64.6) | 17.0 (62.6) | 18.0 (64.4) | 22.9 (73.2) | 26.6 (79.9) | 30.8 (87.4) | 32.9 (91.2) | 35.4 (95.7) |
| Mean daily maximum °C (°F) | 21.1 (70.0) | 21.2 (70.2) | 19.1 (66.4) | 15.8 (60.4) | 13.0 (55.4) | 11.2 (52.2) | 10.6 (51.1) | 11.3 (52.3) | 12.5 (54.5) | 15.0 (59.0) | 17.4 (63.3) | 18.9 (66.0) | 15.6 (60.1) |
| Mean daily minimum °C (°F) | 10.6 (51.1) | 10.8 (51.4) | 10.0 (50.0) | 8.3 (46.9) | 7.0 (44.6) | 5.6 (42.1) | 5.1 (41.2) | 5.0 (41.0) | 5.5 (41.9) | 6.1 (43.0) | 7.7 (45.9) | 8.9 (48.0) | 7.6 (45.6) |
| Record low °C (°F) | 2.9 (37.2) | 2.0 (35.6) | 1.4 (34.5) | 0.3 (32.5) | −1.6 (29.1) | −1.6 (29.1) | −0.8 (30.6) | −1.5 (29.3) | −1.5 (29.3) | −1.5 (29.3) | 0.6 (33.1) | 1.9 (35.4) | −1.6 (29.1) |
| Average precipitation mm (inches) | 69.1 (2.72) | 52.6 (2.07) | 84.8 (3.34) | 96.8 (3.81) | 160.0 (6.30) | 150.2 (5.91) | 199.3 (7.85) | 203.2 (8.00) | 166.4 (6.55) | 132.4 (5.21) | 96.1 (3.78) | 88.1 (3.47) | 1,494.6 (58.84) |
| Average precipitation days (≥ 0.2 mm) | 14.7 | 13.6 | 18.4 | 21.5 | 24.9 | 23.6 | 26.2 | 26.4 | 24.8 | 22.2 | 18.2 | 18.2 | 252.7 |
| Average afternoon relative humidity (%) | 65 | 64 | 68 | 78 | 85 | 87 | 87 | 84 | 79 | 74 | 68 | 67 | 76 |
| Average dew point °C (°F) | 11.3 (52.3) | 11.9 (53.4) | 10.8 (51.4) | 9.7 (49.5) | 8.7 (47.7) | 7.4 (45.3) | 6.9 (44.4) | 6.8 (44.2) | 6.8 (44.2) | 7.6 (45.7) | 8.9 (48.0) | 9.6 (49.3) | 8.9 (47.9) |
Source: Bureau of Meteorology (1989-2025)

== Road infrastructure ==
The C218 route (Trowutta Road) enters from the north-east and travels south for a short distance before splitting to two branches. Trowutta Road exits to the east and Roger River Road runs south-west through the locality before exiting. Route C214 (Blackwater Road) starts at an intersection with route C218 on the south-western boundary and runs away to the south-west.
