= Scopus, Tasmania =

Scopus Tasmania
- Coordinates: 40°49′25″S 144°59′38″E
- Population: 48 (2016 census)
- Postcode(s): 7330
- Location: 19 km (12 mi) W of Smithton
- LGA(s): Circular Head
- Region: North-west and west
- State electorate(s): Braddon
- Federal division(s): Braddon
Localities around Scopus:
Montagu	Acton Bay	Duck Bay
Montagu	Scopus	Smithton
Montagu	Smithton	Smithton

Scopus is a rural locality in the local government area (LGA) of Circular Head in the North-west and west LGA region of Tasmania. The locality is about 19 kilometres (12 mi) west of the town of Smithton. The 2016 census recorded a population of 48 for the state suburb of Scopus.

== History ==
Scopus was gazetted as a locality in 1973. It is believed that the name comes from Mount Scopus in Jerusalem.

== Geography ==
The waters of inlets of Bass Strait form much of the northern and eastern boundaries.

== Road infrastructure ==
Route C215 (Montagu Road) runs through from east to north-west.
