= Edith Creek, Tasmania =

Edith Creek Tasmania
- Coordinates: 40°57′19″S 145°05′40″E
- Population: 141 (2016 census)
- Postcode(s): 7330
- Location: 13 km (8 mi) S of Smithton
- LGA(s): Circular Head
- Region: North West Tasmania
- State electorate(s): Braddon
- Federal division(s): Braddon
Localities around Edith Creek:
Christmas Hills	Scotchtown	Irishtown
Christmas Hills	Edith Creek	Lileah
Roger River	Nabageena	Nabageena

Edith Creek is a locality and small rural community in the local government area of Circular Head, in the North West region of Tasmania. It is located about 13 kilometres (8.1 mi) south of the town of Smithton. The Duck River flows through the locality, where it is joined by a stream named "Edith Creek". The 2016 census determined a population of 141 for the state suburb of Edith Creek.

== History ==
The locality name was gazetted and confirmed in 1973. It is likely that it was derived from the stream of the same name.

== Road infrastructure ==
The C217 route (Trowutta Road) runs from the Bass Highway to the B22 route, which becomes Trowutta Road from this point south. B22 then connects to the C218 (a continuation of Trowutta Road) and C219 (South Road) routes in the locality, providing access to areas further south.
