= Woolnorth / Temdudheker, Tasmania =

Woolnorth / Temdudheker
- Town
- Coordinates: 40°45′42″S 144°45′58″E
- Country: Australia
- State: Tasmania
- Region: North-west and west
- LGA: Circular Head
- Location: 37 km (23 mi) NW of Smithton

Government
  - State electorate: Braddon
  - Federal division: Braddon

Population
  - Total: 112 (2016 census)
- Postcode: 7330
Localities around Woolnorth / Temdudheker
Southern Ocean	Bass Strait	Bass Strait
Southern Ocean	Woolnorth / Temdudheker	West Montagu
Marrawah	Marrawah, West Montagu	West Montagu

Woolnorth / Temdudheker is a rural locality in the local government area of Circular Head in the North-west and west region of Tasmania. The locality is about 37 kilometres (23 mi) north-west of the town of Smithton. The 2021 census recorded a population of 161 for the state suburb of Woolnorth.

== History ==
Woolnorth / Temdudheker is a confirmed locality. A property named Woolnorth was established in the area by the Van Diemen's Land Company in 1827. Cape Grim, on the Woolnorth property, was the scene of a massacre of Aboriginal people in 1828.

It was officially dual named in March 2021.

== Geography ==
Woolnorth / Temdudheker is a triangular locality with boundaries on the west, north-east and south-east. The Southern Ocean forms most of the western boundary, and Bass Strait the north-eastern. The Woolnorth Wind Farm is in the locality.

== Road infrastructure ==
The C215 route (Harcus River Road) enters from the north-east and follows the south-east boundary to the south, where it exits.
