= Christmas Hills =

Christmas Hills may refer to the following places in Australia:

- Christmas Hills, Tasmania
- Christmas Hills, Victoria
