= Christmas Hills, Tasmania =

Christmas Hills
- Town
- Coordinates: 40°53′27″S 145°02′19″E
- Country: Australia
- State: Tasmania
- Region: North-west and west
- LGA: Circular Head
- Location: 9 km (5.6 mi) SW of Smithton

Government
  - State electorate: Braddon
  - Federal division: Braddon

Population
  - Total: 115 (2016 census)
- Postcode: 7330
Localities around Christmas Hills
Montagu	Montagu, Mella	Broadmeadows
Togari, Brittons Swamp	Christmas Hills	Smithton, Edith Creek, Roger River
Togari	Roger River, Togari	Roger River

Christmas Hills is a rural locality in the local government area (LGA) of Circular Head in the North-west and west LGA region of Tasmania. The locality is about 9 kilometres (5.6 mi) south-west of the town of Smithton. The 2016 census recorded a population of 115 for the state suburb of Christmas Hills.

== History ==
Christmas Hills was gazetted as a locality in 1973.

Christmas Hills was apparently named by local pastoralist William Field after he had lunch there on Christmas Day some time in the 1820s.

== Geography ==
The Duck River forms a small part of the eastern boundary. Many of the boundaries are survey lines.

== Road infrastructure ==
Route A2 (Bass Highway) runs through from north-east to north-west.
