= Couta Rocks =

- Town
- Coordinates: 41°10′29″S 144°40′56″E
- Country: Australia
- State: Tasmania
- Region: North-west and west
- LGA: Circular Head
- Location: 77 km (48 mi) SW of Smithton

Government
  - State electorate: Braddon
  - Federal division: Braddon

Population
  - Total: 7 (2016 census)
- Postcode: 7330
Localities around Couta Rocks
Southern Ocean	Nelson Bay	West Coast
Southern Ocean	Couta Rocks	West Coast
Southern Ocean	Temma	Temma

Couta Rocks is a rural locality in the local government area (LGA) of Circular Head in the North-west and west LGA region of Tasmania. The locality is about 77 kilometres (48 mi) south-west of the town of Smithton. The 2016 census recorded a population of 7 for the state suburb of Couta Rocks.

== History ==
Couta Rocks is a confirmed locality.

== Geography ==
The waters of the Southern Ocean form the western boundary. Rebecca Creek forms much of the southern boundary.

== Road infrastructure ==
Route C214 (Rebecca Road / Temma Road) runs through from east to north-west.
