= Wiltshire, Tasmania =

Wiltshire Tasmania
- Coordinates: 40°50′18″S 145°16′06″E
- Population: 36 (2016 census)
- Postcode(s): 7321
- Location: 19 km (12 mi) E of Smithton
- LGA(s): Circular Head
- Region: North West Tasmania
- State electorate(s): Braddon
- Federal division(s): Braddon
Localities around Wiltshire:
Forest	Stanley	Bass Strait
Forest	Wiltshire	Bass Strait
Forest	Forest	Black River

Wiltshire is a locality and small rural community in the local government area of Circular Head, in the North West region of Tasmania. It is located about 19 kilometres (12 mi) east of the town of Smithton. The Bass Highway passes through from south-east to north-west. The Black River forms part of the southern boundary, while Bass Strait forms most of the eastern and northern boundaries. The 2016 census determined a population of 36 for the state suburb of Wiltshire.

== History ==
Previously known as Wiltshire Junction, it is believed to be named after Wiltshire in England.

== Road infrastructure ==
The C221 route (Back Line Road) terminates at the Bass Highway in Wiltshire. It runs south and then west through Forest before rejoining the Bass Highway at the western extremity of that locality. The B21 (Stanley Highway) and C219 (Mengha Road) routes each terminate at the Bass Highway at the Wiltshire / Forest / Stanley tripoint. B21 runs north to Stanley, while C219 runs south through Forest to Mengha, from where it provides access to many localities on the west coast of Tasmania.
