= Broadmeadows, Tasmania =

Broadmeadows
- Town
- Coordinates: 40°52′05″S 145°04′42″E
- Country: Australia
- State: Tasmania
- Region: North-west and west
- LGA: Circular Head
- Location: 4 km (2.5 mi) W of Smithton

Government
  - State electorate: Braddon
  - Federal division: Braddon

Population
  - Total: 40 (2016 census)
- Postcode: 7330
Localities around Broadmeadows
Mella	Smithton, Mella	Smithton
Mella, Christmas Hills	Broadmeadows	Smithton
Christmas Hills	Smithton, Christmas Hills	Smithton

Broadmeadows is a rural locality in the local government area (LGA) of Circular Head in the North-west and west LGA region of Tasmania. The locality is about 4 kilometres (2.5 mi) west of the town of Smithton. The 2016 census recorded a population of 40 for the state suburb of Broadmeadows.

== History ==
Broadmeadows was gazetted as a locality in 1973.

This area was cleared of heavy timber and drained to become prime farming land.

== Geography ==
The Duck River forms the north-eastern boundary. Many of the boundaries are survey lines.

== Road infrastructure ==
Route A2 (Bass Highway) runs through from north-east to south-west.
