= Mella, Tasmania =

Mella Tasmania
- Coordinates: 40°51′43″S 145°02′45″E
- Population: 74 (2016 census)
- Postcode(s): 7330
- Location: 8 km (5 mi) W of Smithton
- LGA(s): Circular Head
- Region: North-west and west
- State electorate(s): Braddon
- Federal division(s): Braddon
Localities around Mella:
Smithton	Smithton	Smithton
Montagu	Mella	Smithton
Christmas Hills	Christmas Hills	Broadmeadows

Mella is a rural locality in the local government area (LGA) of Circular Head in the North-west and west LGA region of Tasmania. The locality is about 8 kilometres (5.0 mi) west of the town of Smithton. The 2016 census recorded a population of 74 for the state suburb of Mella.

== History ==
Mella was gazetted as a locality in 1971. Mella is believed to be an Aboriginal word meaning “to run”.

The Lacrum Dairy Farm, which features a rotary milking parlor and is open to the public, is in the locality.

== Geography ==
Scopus Creek forms part of the southern boundary, flows through to the north, and then forms a small part of the northern boundary.

== Road infrastructure ==
Route A2 (Bass Highway) runs past to the south-east. From there Mella Road provides access to the locality.
