= Broadmeadows (disambiguation) =

Broadmeadows is a suburb of Melbourne, Australia.

Broadmeadows may also refer to:

== Places and their facilities ==
=== Australia ===
- Associated with the Melbourne suburb
  - Broadmeadows railway station, Melbourne
  - Broadmeadows Bus Service
  - Broadmeadows Central
  - Broadmeadows Assembly Plant, a former motor vehicle factory
  - Broadmeadows Valley Trail, a shared use path
- Broadmeadows, Tasmania, a locality
- Broadmeadows railway station, Adelaide

=== United Kingdom ===
- Broadmeadows, Scottish Borders, a village in Scotland

=== New Zealand ===
- Broadmeadows, New Zealand, a suburb of Wellington

== See also ==
- Broadmeadow, New South Wales, a suburb of Newcastle
