= Smithton Airport =

Airport in Smithton, Tasmania, Australia

- IATA: SIO; ICAO: YSMI

Summary
- Airport type: Public
- Operator: Building Tasmania
- Location: Smithton, Tasmania
- Elevation AMSL: 31 ft (9.4 m)
- Coordinates: 40°50′06″S 145°05′00″E

Maps
- Location in Tasmania
- Interactive map of Smithton Airport

Runways
Direction	Length		Surface
Direction	m	ft	Surface
06/24	1,599	5,246	Asphalt
10/28	620	2,034	Gravel
- Sources: Australian AIP and aerodrome chart

Smithton Airport (IATA: SIO, ICAO: YSMI) is an Australian regional airport located west of Smithton, Tasmania. It is operated by Building Tasmania. In addition to aviation uses, the airport has previously hosted a care farm and commercial goat dairy. This unusual dual occpancy that allowed grazing goats on the airport grounds assisted in fire prevention and maintaining the grass for aircraft operations.

== History ==
The airfield was initially developed by the community in 1932, who paid unemployed volunteers for 200 hours of labour to clear and drain the land to prepare an aircraft landing site. The first aircraft to land at the site was a Westland Wapiti of the Royal Australian Air Force on 27 February 1932. On completion of further drainage works, the aerodrome was licensed and Holyman's Airways commenced services in November 1933 as a leg of the milk run connecting communities along the North West coast to Launceston.

A fire that ignited in a nearby sawmill spread to the airfield in February 1947. As there was no water or firefighting equipment available on the site, the fire quickly destroyed several buildings, including an aircraft hangar.

In 1953, the Department of Civil Aviation cancelled the aerodrome's operating licence, citing a lack of maintenance of the facilities by the Tasmanian Government. Following significant pressure from the Circular Head Council and local aero club, funding was secured to rebuild and upgrade the airfield to handle large aircraft like the Douglas DC-4 by the middle of 1955.

== Accidents and incidents ==
- On 14 March 2003, four people were killed when a Cessna 172 crashed while operating a series of charter flights between Smithton and Trefoil Island. The aircraft, which had been carrying construction crews to the island, was overloaded when it lost engine power due to carburetor icing, leading to a stall at low altitude. The victims were locals from the Smithton area including two young apprentices aged 17 and 18.
