= Nelson Bay, Tasmania =

Nelson Bay
- Town
- Coordinates: 41°08′00″S 144°40′21″E
- Country: Australia
- State: Tasmania
- Region: North-west and west
- LGA: Circular Head
- Location: 74 km (46 mi) SW of Smithton

Government
  - State electorate: Braddon
  - Federal division: Braddon

Population
  - Total: 4 (2016 census)
- Postcode: 7330
Localities around Nelson Bay
Southern Ocean	Arthur River	West Coast
Southern Ocean	Nelson Bay	West Coast
Southern Ocean	Couta Rocks	West Coast

Nelson Bay is a rural locality in the local government area (LGA) of Circular Head in the North-west and west LGA region of Tasmania. The locality is about 74 kilometres (46 mi) south-west of the town of Smithton. The 2016 census recorded a population of 4 for the state suburb of Nelson Bay.

== History ==
Nelson Bay is a confirmed locality.

== Geography ==
The Southern Ocean forms the western boundary, and Tiger Creek forms the northern. The Nelson Bay River flows through from east to west.

== Road infrastructure ==
Route C214 (Temma Road) runs through from north to south.
