= Big Ben (locomotive) =

Steam locomotive in Tasmania, Australia

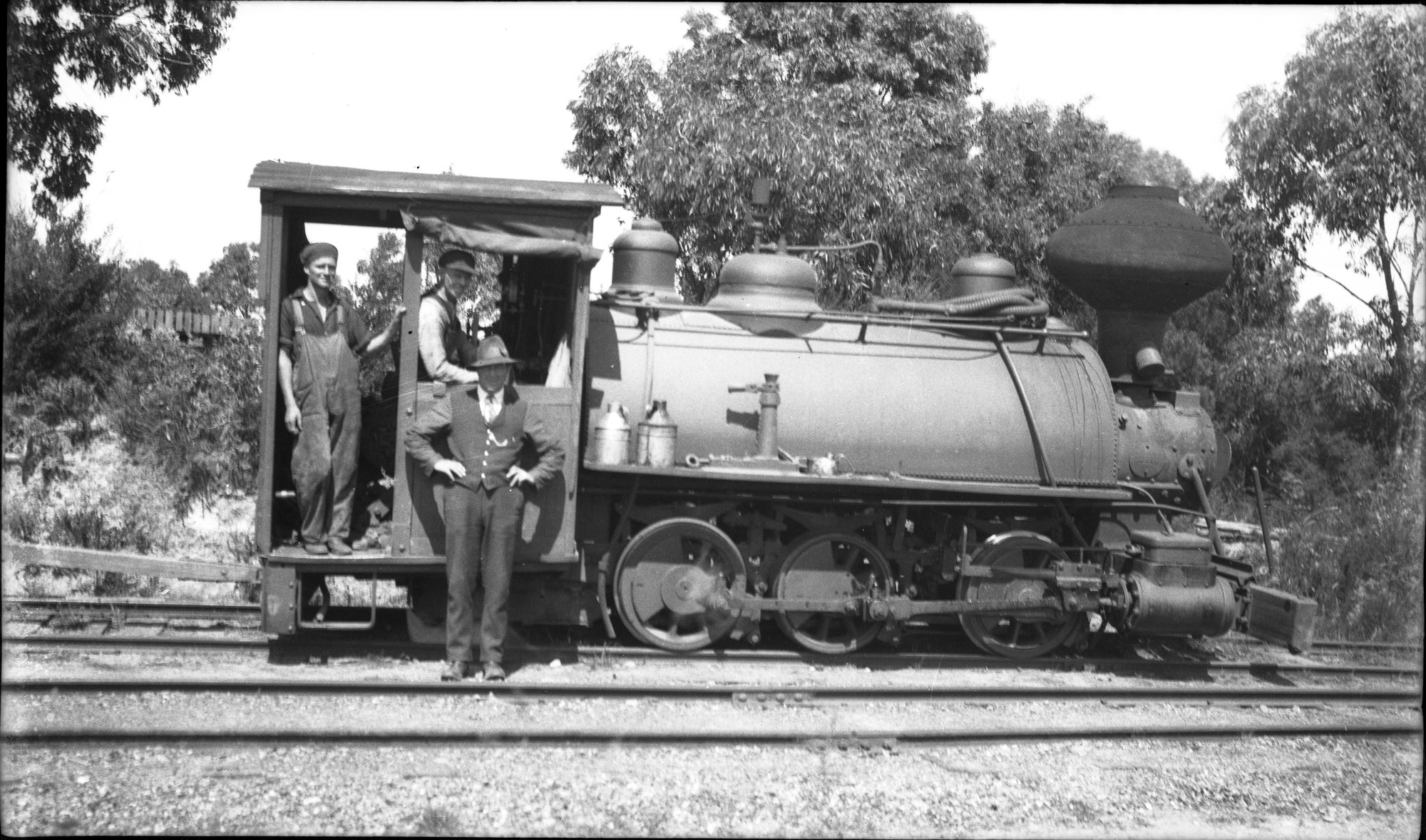
Big Ben on the Marrawah Tramway

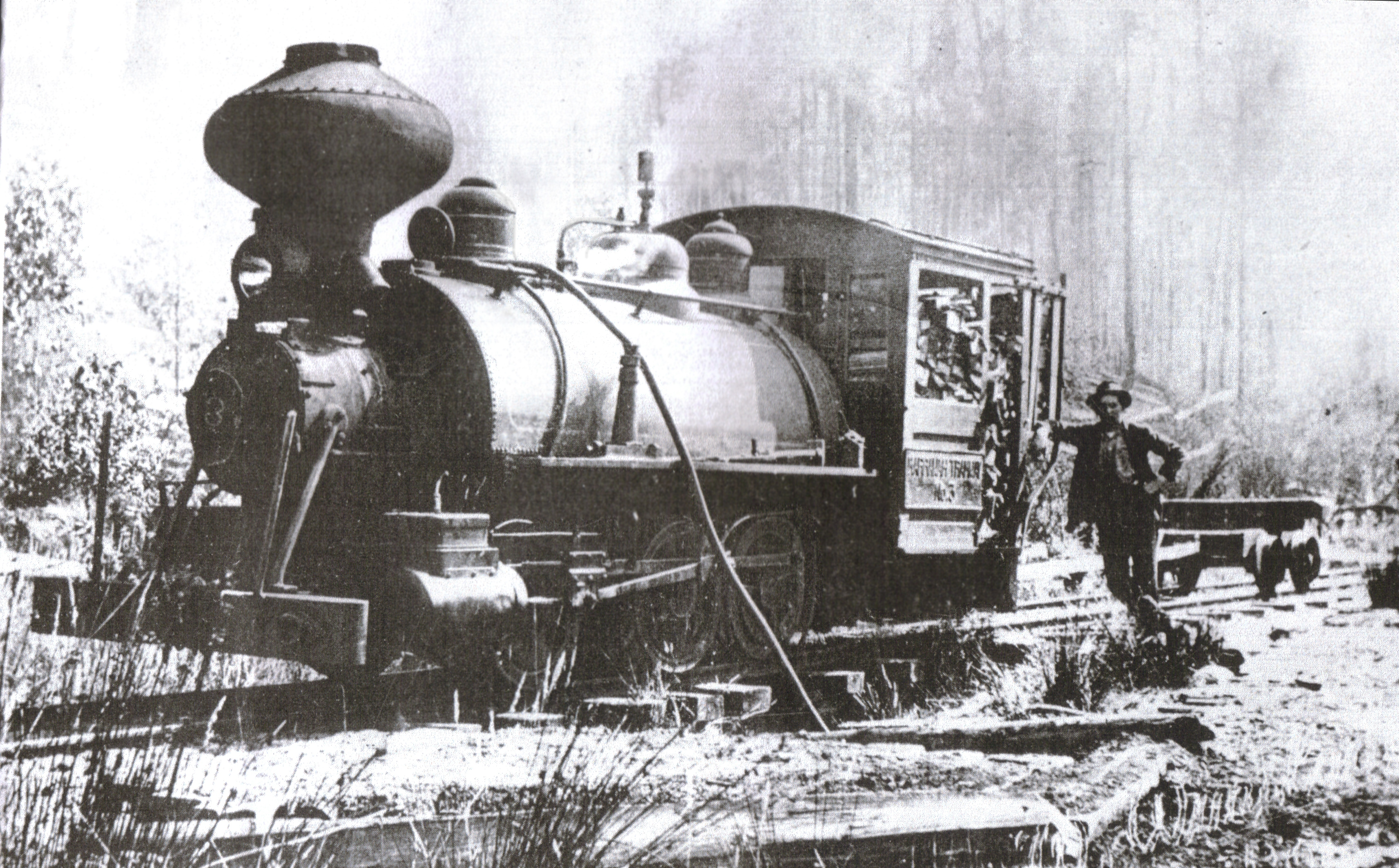
Big Ben on the Marrawah Tramway, early 1900s

The locomotive locally known as Big Ben was built by Baldwin Locomotive Works as an 0-6-0 ST type in 1919 as works number 5212. It was exported in a new condition on a steamer from New York to Tasmania, Australia, where it was used by the Public Works Department on the Marrawah Tramway in Tasmania's far north west running between Smithton and Marrawah.

On the Marrawah Tramway, the locomotive was locally known as Big Ben, however it was also referred to as Marrawah tramway No. 3. When the Tasmanian Government Railways (TGR) took over the Marrawah Tramway in 1929, the engine passed into its ownership. Big Ben was apparently light on the front wheels and as a result, the front was often prone to rise above the wheels when running front first. On 6 September 1938 when running with a load of logs the wheels risen up again but when they came down they didn't find the rails resulting in a derailment which caused the driver to die from injuries the next day. After this incident, a load of old rails were tied to the front of the engine to weigh it down.

In April 1946, Big Ben was sent to Launceston to receive a general overhaul but was only used as a standby engine on the tram due to the TGR introduction of more powerful locomotives. In 1948 Big Ben was sent to work on the Oatlands railway line in southern Tasmania because the other engines working it were needed on other branch lines.

In 1949 after the Oatlands lines closure Big Ben was sent to Launceston as a shunter and was scrapped in October 1951.
