= Alcomie, Tasmania =

Alcomie Tasmania
- Coordinates: 40°55′53″S 145°11′00″E
- Population: 58 (2021 census)
- Postcode(s): 7330
- Location: 14 km (9 mi) SE of Smithton
- LGA(s): Circular Head
- Region: North West
- State electorate(s): Braddon
- Federal division(s): Braddon
Localities around Alcomie:
Irishtown	Irishtown	Mengha
Irishtown	Alcomie	Mengha
Lileah	Lileah	Lileah

Alcomie is a rural locality in the local government area of Circular Head in the North West region of Tasmania. It is located about 14 kilometres (8.7 mi) south-east of the town of Smithton. The 2021 census recorded a population of 58 for Alcomie.

== History ==
The locality was gazetted in 1907. Alcomie is the Aboriginal term for “beautiful view”.

== Geography ==
The western part of the locality is farmland, while the south-east remains heavily timbered.

== Road infrastructure ==
The C219 route (South Road) enters from the north-east and runs west, south and north-west before exiting, where it turns south along the western boundary for a short distance. Route C220 (Johns Hill Road) starts at an intersection with route C219 on the western boundary and runs away to the west.
