= Detention, Tasmania =

Detention
- Town
- Coordinates: 40°52′42″S 145°27′06″E
- Country: Australia
- State: Tasmania
- Region: North-west and west
- LGA: Circular Head
- Location: 35 km (22 mi) E of Smithton

Government
  - State electorate: Braddon
  - Federal division: Braddon

Population
  - Total: nil (2016 census)
- Postcode: 7321
Localities around Detention
Bass Strait	Bass Strait	Bass Strait
Hellyer	Detention	Rocky Cape
Hellyer	Rocky Cape	Rocky Cape

Detention is a rural locality in the local government area (LGA) of Circular Head in the North-west and west LGA region of Tasmania. The locality is about 35 kilometres (22 mi) east of the town of Smithton. The 2016 census recorded a population of nil for the state suburb of Detention.

== History ==
Detention was gazetted as a locality in 1973.

The Detention River, from which the locality takes its name, was so named in 1826 when a party of surveyors was stranded (detained) there by a flood.

== Geography ==
The estuary of the Detention River forms the western boundary, and the waters of Bass Strait the northern.

== Road infrastructure ==
Route A2 (Bass Highway) runs through from east to west.

== Notable residents ==
Senator Eric Bessell attended the state school at Detention in the 1930s.
