= Eric Bessell =

Australian politician

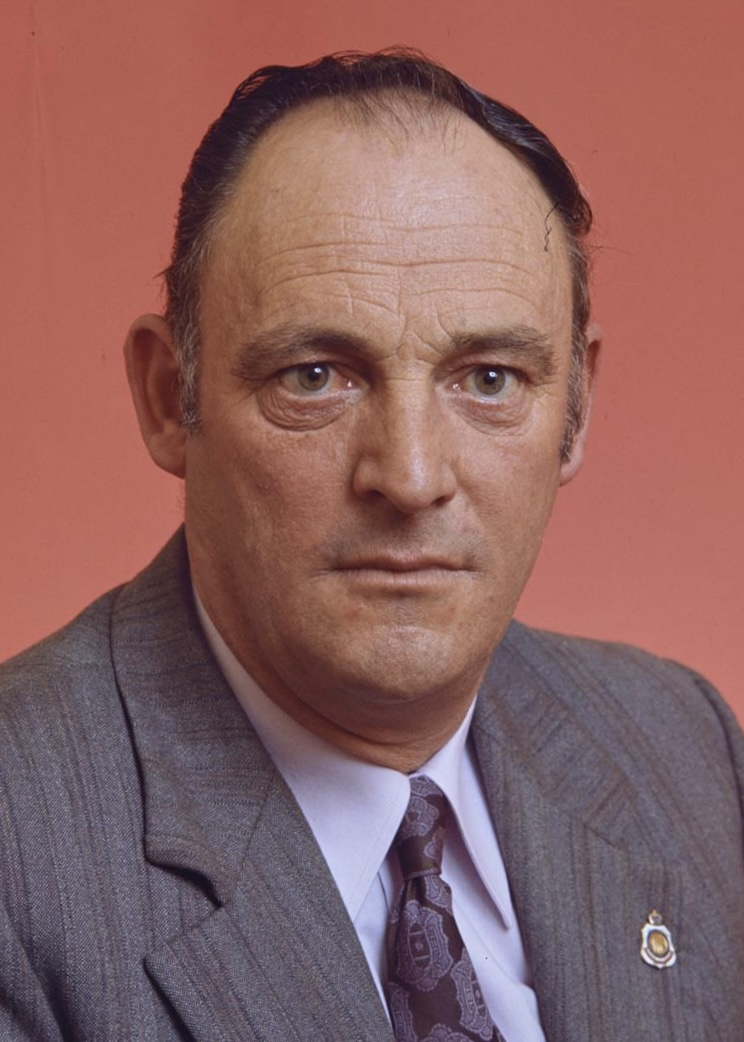
- Bessell in 1974

Senator for Tasmania
- In office 18 May 1974 – 11 November 1975

Personal details
- Born: 6 June 1923 Launceston, Tasmania, Australia
- Died: 10 March 1979 (aged 55) Rocky Cape, Tasmania, Australia
- Party: Liberal
- Spouse: Rita Brydon (m. 1947)
- Occupation: Farmer; Soldier

Eric James Bessell (6 June 1923 – 10 March 1979) was an Australian politician. He was a member of the Liberal Party and served as a Senator for Tasmania from 1974 to 1975. He was also the party's state president from 1966 to 1973. He was a soldier and farmer before entering politics.

== Early life ==
Bessell was born on 6 June 1923 in Launceston, Tasmania. He was the son of Robina Allen (née Dallas) and Harold Aubrey Bessell. His cousin Bert Bessell was also a member of parliament.

Bessell and his family moved to Rocky Cape when he was five years old. He attended the state school at Detention and worked as a woodcutter after leaving school. In 1942, Bessell enlisted in the Australian Army. He served with the 40th Australian Infantry Battalion in Queensland and the Northern Territory before being discharged in 1944.

After the war's end, Bessell acquired "Burnside", a farming property at Rocky Cape, where he farmed cattle, sheep and pigs. He was a member of the Tasmanian Farmers' Federation and served as president of the Stanley sub-branch of the Returned Sailors', Soldiers' and Airmen's Imperial League of Australia from 1958 to 1965.

== Politics ==
Bessell was an officeholder in the Liberal Party from the early 1960s and served as state president from 1966 to 1973. He was also a federal vice-president of the party from 1970 to 1973.

At the 1974 federal election, Bessell was elected to a three-year Senate term, winning the final Senate vacancy in Tasmania as the fourth candidate on the Liberal ticket. His maiden speech focused on rural industry in Tasmania and shipping in the Bass Strait. He spoke regularly on local issues during his time in the Senate and also served on three Senate committees. Bessell had visited King Island during the election campaign. In parliament he was "deeply interested in King Island, raising questions about farming and water reticulation, and the small island's aerodrome".

Bessell achieved a degree of prominence during the 1975 Australian constitutional crisis for his views on the blocking of supply, a political tactic pursued by Liberal leader Malcolm Fraser to pressure Prime Minister Gough Whitlam into calling an early election. On 26 October 1975, Bessell was interviewed on Four Corners and stated that, contrary to Fraser's position, he would not vote to block supply but would support the vote being deferred subject to Whitlam calling an early election. He also stated that several other Liberal senators supported his views. A few days he rose to speak on the appropriation bills, but surprised the Canberra Press Gallery by devoting his speech to "the problems of the Tasmanian potato industry, especially pertaining to the importation of enormous quantities of frozen French fries". This led The Bulletin to dub him "Senator Chips".

Bessell's term was cut short by the double dissolution which accompanied Whitlam's dismissal on 11 November 1975. Due to his views on the blocking of supply, he was demoted to sixth position on the Liberal Party's Senate ticket at the 1975 election. He continued to actively campaign but was unsuccessful in his bid for re-election, using the slogan "he's last on the ticket but first for Tasmania".

== Personal life ==
In 1945, Bessell married Rita Brydon, with whom he had six children. He collapsed and died while walking on his property at Rocky Cape on 10 March 1979, aged 55.
