= Temma =

- Town
- Coordinates: 41°13′49″S 144°41′28″E
- Country: Australia
- State: Tasmania
- Region: North-west and west
- LGA: Circular Head
- Location: 84 km (52 mi) SW of Smithton

Government
  - State electorate: Braddon
  - Federal division: Braddon

Population
  - Total: 10 (2016 census)
- Postcode: 7330
Localities around Temma
Southern Ocean	Couta Rocks	West Coast
Southern Ocean	Temma	West Coast
Southern Ocean	West Coast	West Coast

Temma is a rural locality in the local government area (LGA) of Circular Head in the North-west and west LGA region of Tasmania. The locality is about 84 kilometres (52 mi) south-west of the town of Smithton. The 2016 census recorded a population of 10 for the state suburb of Temma.

== History ==
Temma was gazetted as a locality in 1963. The name was changed from Strickland in 1909. It is believed to be an Aboriginal word for "hut".

The area was originally a mining settlement.

== Geography ==
The waters of the Southern Ocean form the western boundary.

== Road infrastructure ==
Route C214 (Rebecca Road) runs along the northern boundary. Temma Road provides access to the locality.
