= Dip Falls =

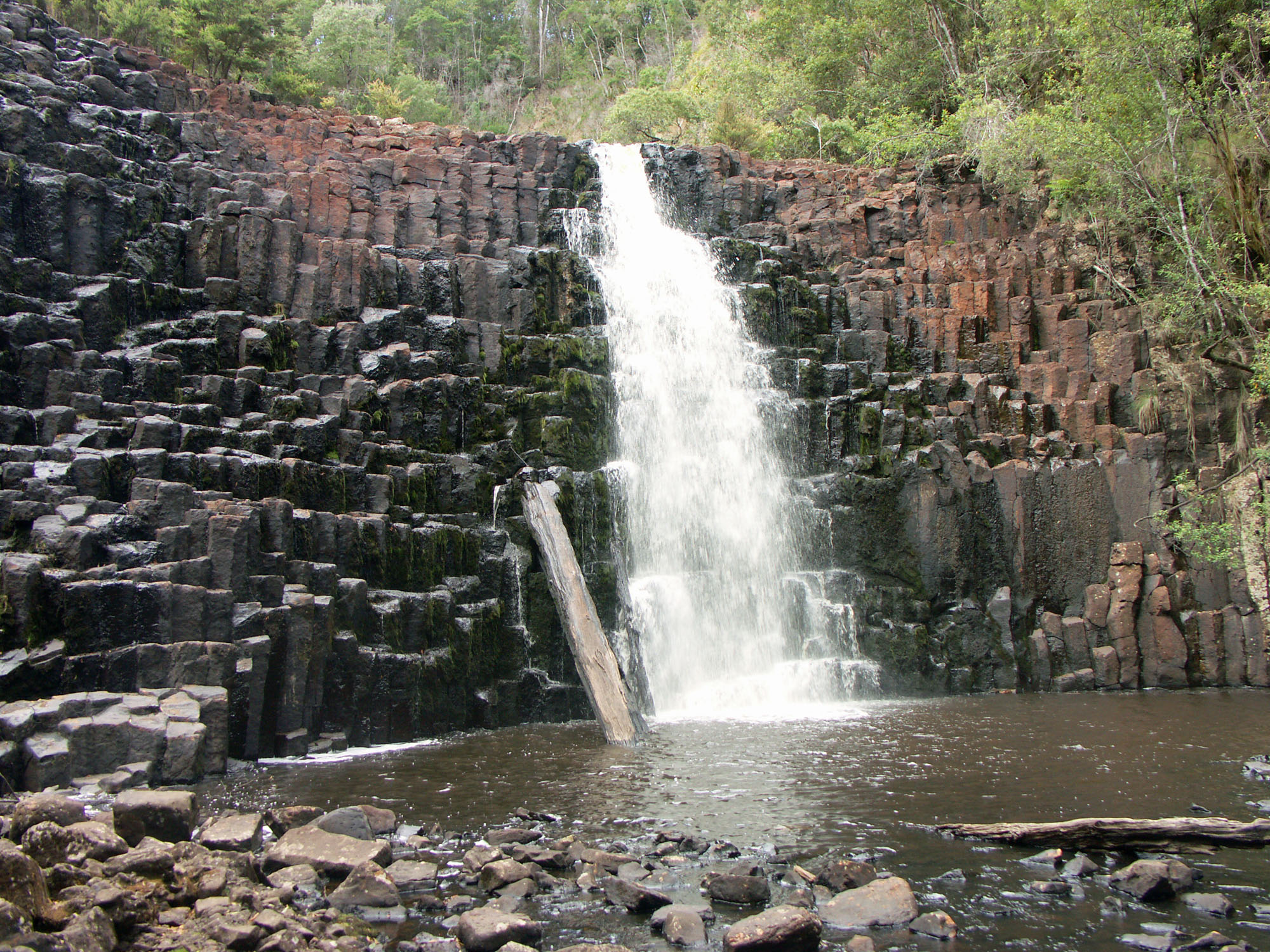
- Dip Falls, in summer 2005.

- Location within Tasmania
- Location: North West Tasmania, Australia
- Coordinates: 41°01′48″S 145°22′12″E
- Type: Cascade
- Elevation: 218 metres (715 ft) AHD
- Total height: 22–34 metres (72–112 ft)
- Watercourse: Dip River

The Dip Falls, a cascade waterfall over cubic-basalt formed rocks on the Dip River, is located in Mawbanna in the North West region of Tasmania, Australia.

== Location and features ==
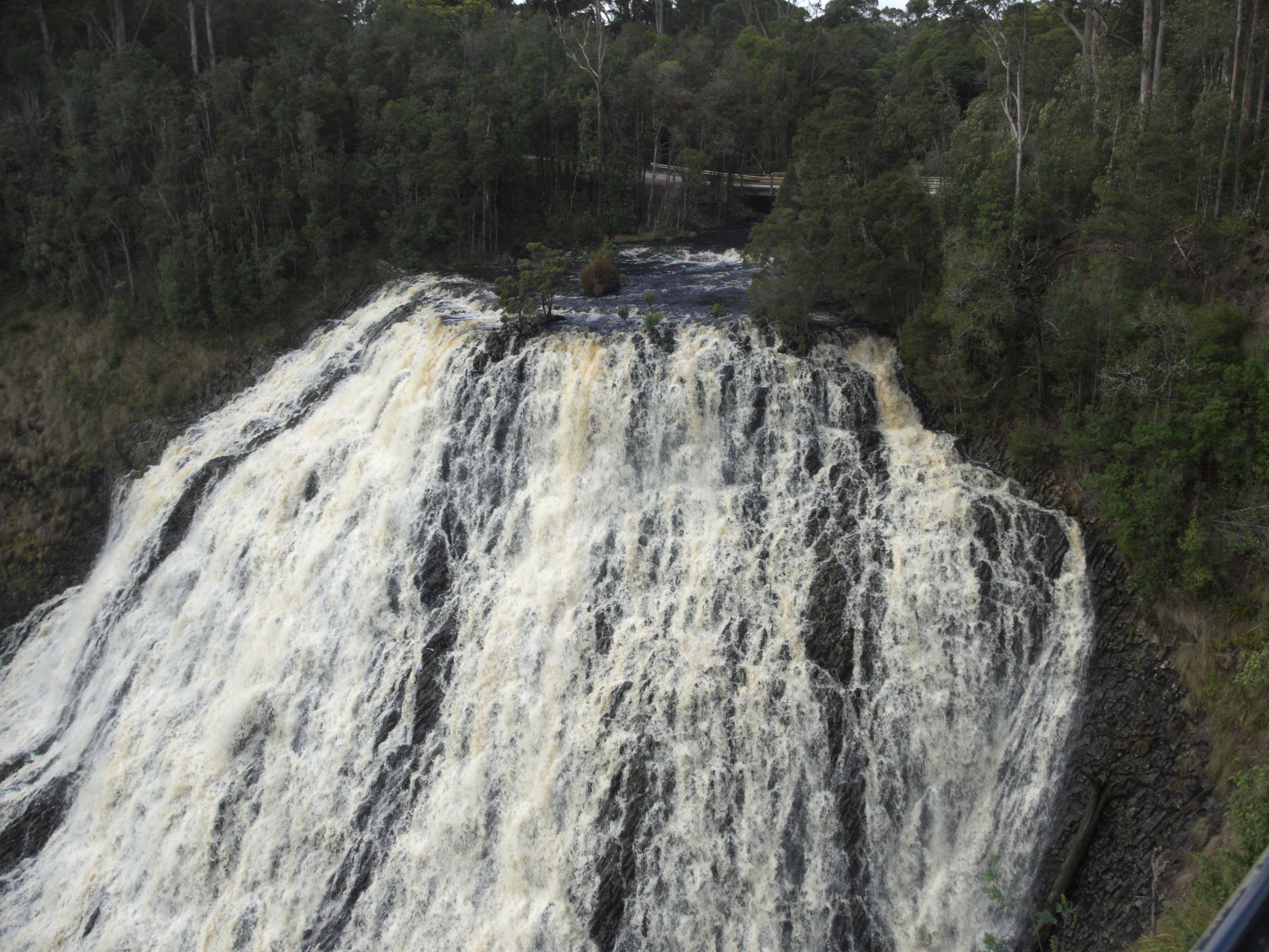
The Dip Falls in winter 2019

The waterfall is situated in the Dip Range Regional Reserve at an elevation of 218 metres (715 ft) above sea level and descends in the range of 22–34 metres (72–112 ft), near the village of Sisters Beach and approximately 36 kilometres (22 mi) southeast of Stanley via the Bass Highway.

== See also ==
- List of waterfalls
- List of waterfalls in Australia
