= Brittons Swamp, Tasmania =

Brittons Swamp Tasmania
- Coordinates: 40°55′06″S 144°57′39″E
- Population: 50 (2016 census)
- Postcode(s): 7330
- Location: 17 km (11 mi) SW of Smithton
- LGA(s): Circular Head
- Region: North-west and west
- State electorate(s): Braddon
- Federal division(s): Braddon
Localities around Brittons Swamp:
Togari	Christmas Hills	Christmas Hills
Togari	Brittons Swamp	Christmas Hills
Togari	Christmas Hills, Togari	Christmas Hills

Brittons Swamp is a rural locality in the local government area (LGA) of Circular Head in the North-west and west LGA region of Tasmania. The locality is about 17 kilometres (11 mi) south-west of the town of Smithton. The 2016 census recorded a population of 50 for the state suburb of Brittons Swamp.

== History ==
Brittons Swamp was gazetted as a locality in 1973.

An early settler named Britton established a sawmill in the area. It was later used as a soldier settlement.

== Geography ==
Many of the boundaries are survey lines.

== Road infrastructure ==
Route A2 (Bass Highway) runs through from north-east to south-west.
