= Forest, Tasmania =

Forest Tasmania
- Coordinates: 40°50′58″S 145°13′55″E
- Population: 464 (2021)
- Postcode(s): 7330
- Location: 11 km (7 mi) E of Smithton
- LGA(s): Circular Head
- Region: North West Tasmania
- State electorate(s): Braddon
- Federal division(s): Braddon
Localities around Forest:
Smithton	Stanley	Bass Strait
Smithton	Forest	Wiltshire
Irishtown	Mengha	Mawbanna

Forest is a locality and small rural community in the local government area of Circular Head, in the North West region of Tasmania. It is located about 11 kilometres (6.8 mi) east of the town of Smithton. The Bass Highway follows the north-western boundary from north-east to south-west. The Black River forms the south-eastern boundary. The 2021 census determined a population of 464 for the state suburb of Forest.

== History ==
The locality may have originally been known as Myrtle Forest. It was gazetted as Forest in 1973.

== Road infrastructure ==
The C221 route (Back Line Road) terminates at the Bass Highway at the Forest/Smithton midpoint. It runs east and then north through the locality before rejoining the Bass Highway in Wiltshire. The B21 (Stanley Highway) and C219 (Mengha Road) routes each terminate at the Bass Highway at the Wiltshire / Forest / Stanley tripoint. B21 runs north to Stanley, while C219 runs south through Forest to Mengha, from where it provides access to many localities on the west coast of Tasmania.
