= Montagu, Tasmania =

Montagu
- Town
- Coordinates: 40°46′41″S 144°57′07″E
- Country: Australia
- State: Tasmania
- Region: North-west and west
- LGA: Circular Head
- Location: 19 km (12 mi) NW of Smithton

Government
  - State electorate: Braddon
  - Federal division: Braddon

Population
  - Total: 92 (2016 census)
- Postcode: 7330
Localities around Montagu
Robbins Passage	Robbins Passage	Robbins Passage
West Montagu	Montagu	Scopus, Mella
West Montagu	Christmas Hills	Christmas Hills

Montagu is a rural locality in the local government area (LGA) of Circular Head in the North-west and west LGA region of Tasmania. The locality is about 19 kilometres (12 mi) north-west of the town of Smithton. The 2016 census recorded a population of 92 for the state suburb of Montagu.

== History ==
Montagu was gazetted as a locality in 1967. The Montagu River and the locality were named for John Montagu, who was Colonial Secretary of Van Diemen's Land from 1834 to 1842.

== Geography ==
The Montagu River forms the western boundary, and the waters of Robbins Passage form the northern.

== Road infrastructure ==
Route C215 (Montagu Road) runs through from east to west.

== See also ==
- Robbins Passage and Boullanger Bay Important Bird Area
