= Circular Head Council =

- Local government area
- Interactive map of Circular Head Council
- Coordinates: 41.0673°S 145.0122°E
- Country: Australia
- State: Tasmania
- Region: Smithton and Stanley area
- Established: 1 January 1907
- Council seat: Smithton

Government
  - Mayor: Gerard Blizzard
  - State electorate: Braddon
  - Federal division: Braddon

Area
  - Total: 4,898 km^{2} (1,891 sq mi)

Population
  - Total: 8,117 (2018)
  - Density: 1.65721/km^{2} (4.2921/sq mi)
- Website: Circular Head Council
LGAs around Circular Head Council
King Island	Bass Strait	Bass Strait
Southern Ocean	Circular Head Council	Waratah-Wynyard
Southern Ocean	West Coast	West Coast

Circular Head Council is a local government body in Tasmania covering the far north-west mainland. It is classified as a rural local government area with a population of 8,066, and its major towns and localities include Arthur River, Marrawah and Stanley, with Smithton being the largest and principal town. The area includes the smaller islands immediately off the north-west tip of the state, including Robbins Island, Hunter Island and Three Hummock Island. The origin of the name "Circular Head" is unknown.

== History and attributes ==
Circular Head was established on 1 January 1907, and the boundaries were altered in 1993 as part of a reorganisation.

Circular Head is classified as rural, agricultural and large (RAL) under the Australian Classification of Local Governments.

== Council ==
=== Current composition ===
Name	Position	Party affiliation
Gerard Blizzard	Mayor/Councillor	Independent
Annette Dawes	Deputy Mayor/Councillor	Independent
Sally Collins	Councillor	Independent
Mark Dabner	Councillor	Independent
Rodney Flowers	Councillor	Jacqui Lambie Network
Steve Pilkington	Councillor	Independent
John Oldaker	Councillor	Independent
Ashley Popowski	Councillor	Independent
Tony Hine	Councillor	Independent

== Election results ==
=== 2022 ===
2022 Tasmanian local elections: Circular Head
Party	Candidate	Votes	%	±%
Independent	Gerard Blizzard (elected)	828	18.12	
Independent	Anette Dawes (elected)	800	17.51	
Independent Liberal	John Oldaker (elected)	550	12.04	
Independent	Sally Collins (elected)	376	8.23	
Independent	Ashley Popowski (elected)	361	7.90	
Independent	Steve Pilkington (elected)	313	6.85	
Independent JLN	Rodney Flowers (elected)	271	5.93	
Independent	Mark Dabner (elected)	227	4.97	
Independent	Tony Hine (elected)	225	4.92	
Independent	Melissa Wells	225	4.92	
Independent	John McNab	219	4.79	
Independent	Isaac Long	128	2.80	
Independent	Ian Heres	47	1.03	
Total formal votes		4,570	97.58	
Informal votes		113	2.41	
Turnout		4,683	82.24	

== Localities ==
Locality	Population (2011 census)	Reason
Woolnorth		Incl. in Arthur River
West Montagu		Incl. in Montagu
Montagu	327	Includes West Montagu, Broadmeadows, Mella, Sorpus
Scopus		Incl. in Montagu
Hunter Island		Incl. in Arthur River
Three Hummock Island		Incl. in Arthur River
Trefoil Island		Incl. in Arthur River
Walker Island		Incl. in Arthur River
Robbins Island		Incl. in Arthur River
Kangaroo Island		Incl. in Arthur River
Perkins Island		Incl. in Arthur River
Mella		Incl. in Montagu
Smithton	3,935	
Broadmeadows		Incl. in Montagu
Stanley	481	
Wiltshire		Incl. in Forest
Black River		Incl. in Mawbanna
Cowrie Point		Incl. in Mawbanna
Port Latta		Incl. in Mawbanna
Crayfish Creek		Incl. in Hellyer
Edgcumbe Beach		Incl. in Hellyer
Rocky Cape	216	
Montumana		Incl. in Mawbanna
Mawbanna	208	Includes Montumana, Port Latta, Cowrtie Point, Black River
Forest	590	Includes Wiltshire
South Forest		Incl. in Mengha
Mengha	300	Includes South Forest, Alcombie
Scotchtown	303	Includes Edith Creek
Irishtown	287	
Alcomie		Incl. in Mengha
Lileah		Incl. in Trowutta
Nabageena		Incl. in Trowutta
Edith Creek		Incl. in Scotchtown
Roger River		Incl. in Trowutta
Detention		Incl. in Rocky Cape
Hellyer	302	Includes Crayfish Creek, Edgcumbe Beach
West Coast	13	Includes Temma
Christmas Hills		Incl. in Redpa
Brittons Swamp		Incl. in Redpa
Togari		Incl. in Redpa
Redpa	343	Includes Togari, Brittons Swamp, Christmas Hills
Marrawah		Incl. in Arthur River
Arthur River	371	Includes Woolnorth, Hunter Island, Three Hammock Island, Trefoil Island, Walker Island, Robbins Island, Kangaroo Island, Marrawah, Nelson Bay
Nelson Bay		Incl. in Arthur River
Temma		Incl. in Westcoast
Trowutta	297	Includes Lileah, Nabageena, Roger River
Total	7,973	
	4	Variance
Local government total	7,977	Gazetted Central Coast local government area

=== Not in above list ===
- Corinna
- Couta Rocks
- Meunna
- Milabena
- Sisters Creek
- Togari
- West Takone

== See also ==
- List of local government areas of Tasmania
