= Redpa, Tasmania =

Redpa Tasmania
- Coordinates: 40°56′47″S 144°44′34″E
- Population: 97 (2016 census)
- Postcode(s): 7330
- Location: 42 km (26 mi) SW of Smithton
- LGA(s): Circular Head
- Region: North West Tasmania
- State electorate(s): Braddon
- Federal division(s): Braddon
Localities around Redpa:
Marrawah	Redpa	Togari
Arthur River

Redpa is a locality and small rural community in the local government area of Circular Head, in the North West region of Tasmania. It is located about 42 kilometres (26 mi) south-west of the town of Smithton. The Bass Highway passes through from east to west. The Arthur River forms part of the southern boundary. The 2016 census determined a population of 97 for the state suburb of Redpa.

== History ==
The name is believed to be an Aboriginal word meaning "mosquito". The locality was settled in the late nineteenth century.

It was gazetted in 1971 and confirmed in 1972.

The police station and service was the last in Tasmania to have horses as the main means of transport.

== Road infrastructure ==
The C213 route (Comeback Road) terminates at the Bass Highway in Redpa. It runs north and then west through the locality before turning south and rejoining the Bass Highway in Marrawah.
