= Mengha, Tasmania =

Mengha
- Town
- Coordinates: 40°54′34″S 145°13′15″E
- Country: Australia
- State: Tasmania
- Region: North West Tasmania
- LGA: Circular Head
- Location: 14 km (8.7 mi) SE of Smithton

Government
  - State electorate: Braddon
  - Federal division: Braddon

Population
  - Total: 144 (2016 census)
- Postcode: 7330
Localities around Mengha
South Forest	South Forest	South Forest
Alcomie	Mengha	Mawbanna
Alcomie	Mawbanna	Mawbanna

Mengha is a locality and small rural community in the local government area of Circular Head, in the North West region of Tasmania. It is located about 14 kilometres (8.7 mi) south-east of the town of Smithton. The Black River forms part of the eastern boundary. The 2016 census determined a population of 144 for the state suburb of Mengha.

== History ==
The original name of the locality was "Medwin". It was changed to Mengha (meaning "toe") in 1973.

== Road infrastructure ==
The C219 route (Mengha Road) runs from the Bass Highway through the locality to areas further south.
