= Mawbanna, Tasmania =

Mawbanna
- Town
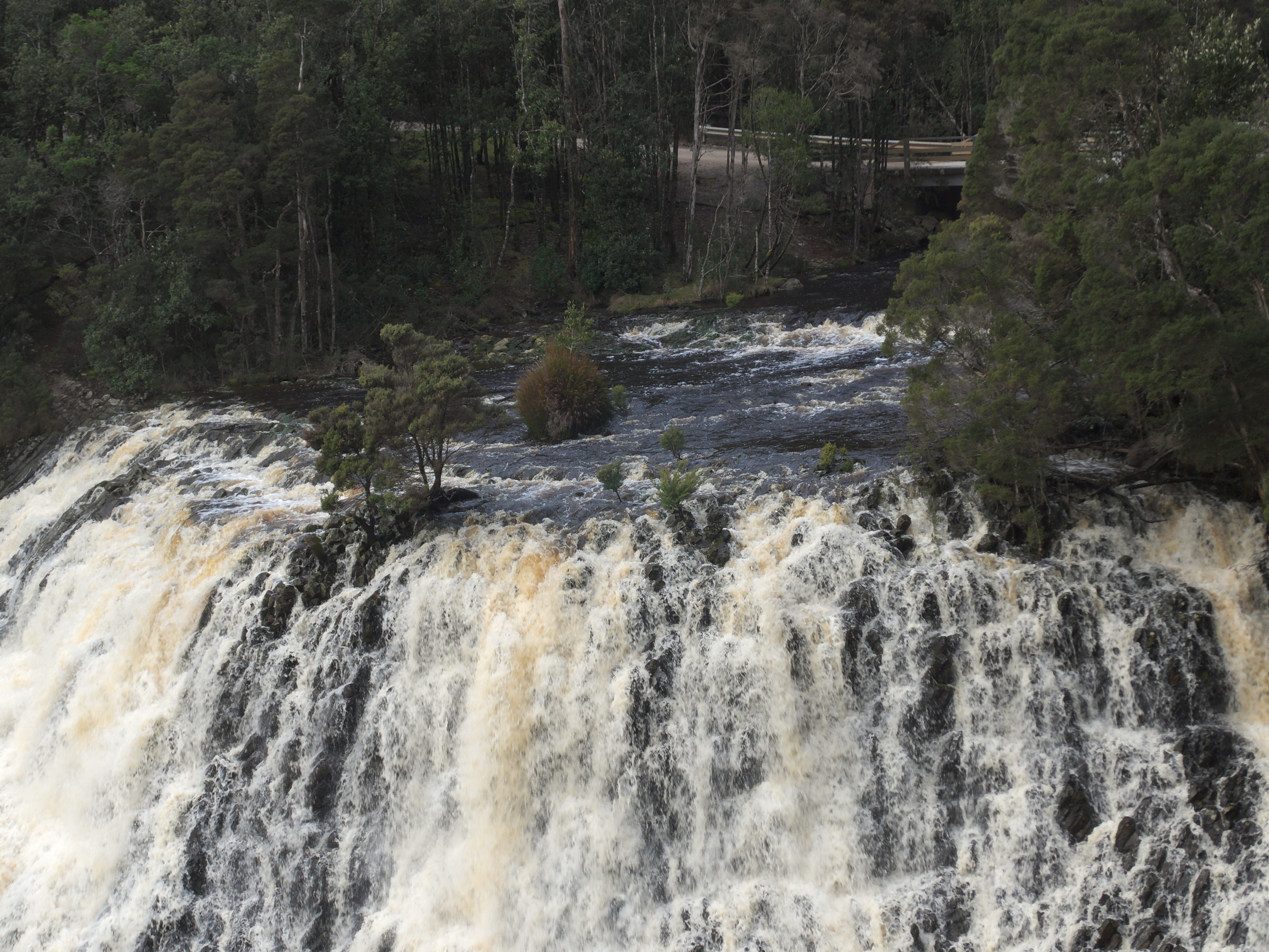
- The Dip Falls

- Coordinates: 40°57′52″S 145°21′15″E
- Country: Australia
- State: Tasmania
- Region: North West Tasmania
- LGA: Circular Head
- Location: 40 km (25 mi) SE of Smithton

Government
  - State electorate: Braddon
  - Federal division: Braddon

Population
  - Total: 135 (2016 census)
- Postcode: 7321
Localities around Mawbanna
Black River	Black River	Montumana
Mengha, Lileah	Mawbanna	Milabena, Meunna
		West Takone

Mawbanna is a locality and small rural community in the local government area of Circular Head, in the North West region of Tasmania, Australia. It is located about 40 kilometres (25 mi) south-east of the town of Smithton. The Arthur River forms the southern boundary, while the Black River forms a small part of the western boundary. The 2016 census determined a population of 135 for the state suburb of Mawbanna.

== History ==
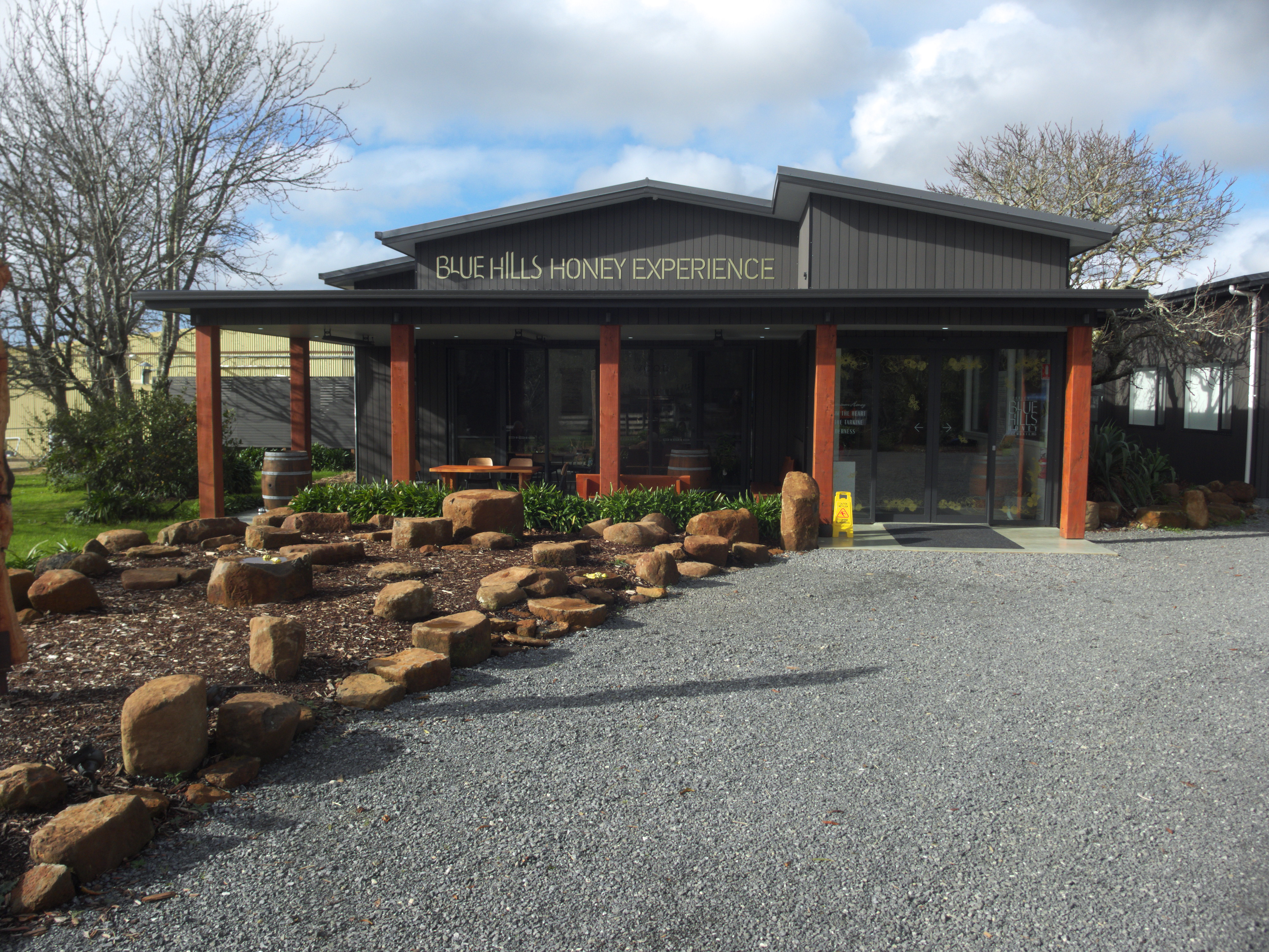
Blue Hills Honey

"Mawbana" is an Aboriginal word for "black". It is likely that the locality name and that of the adjacent river are derived from their Aboriginal names.

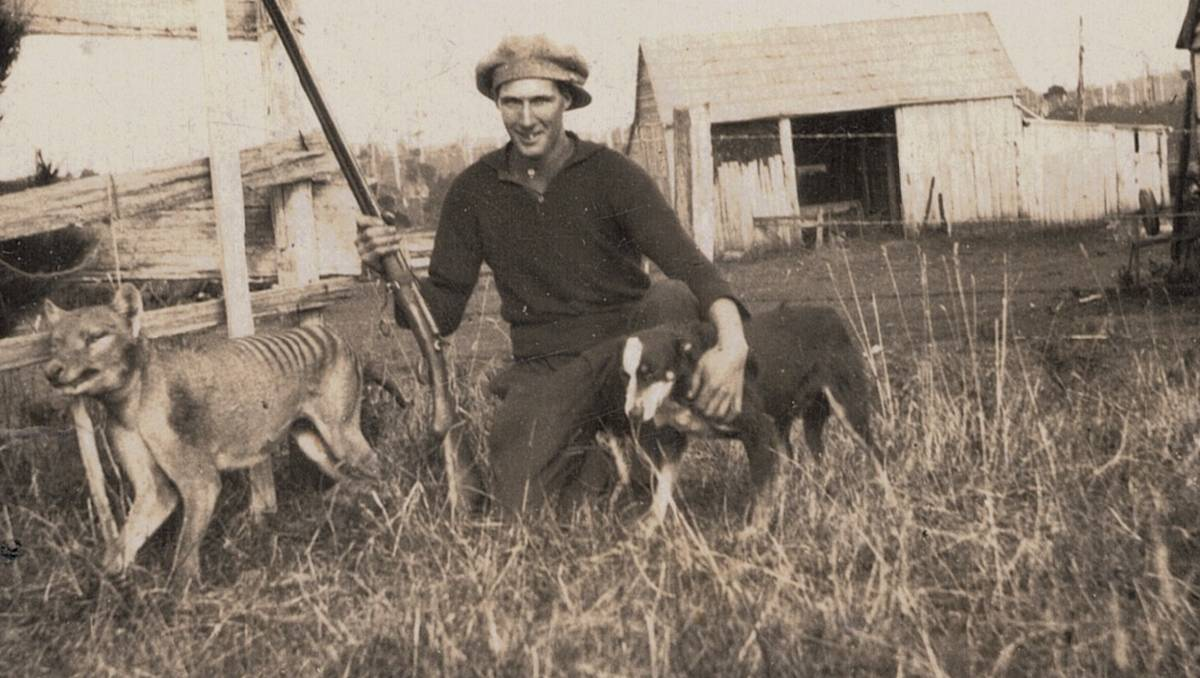
Wilf Batty with the last wild thylacine

The last known thylacine to be killed in the wild was shot in Mawbanna in 1930, on Wilf Batty's farm.

In 1952–1953, the man photographed a live thylacine before it fled.

== Road infrastructure ==
The C225 route (Mawbanna Road) runs from the Bass Highway through the locality to areas further south.
