= Black River (Tasmania) =

River in Tasmania, Australia

- Location of the Black River mouth in Tasmania

Location
- Country: Australia
- State: Tasmania
- Region: North-west

Physical characteristics
- Source: below Mount Dipwood
  - location: in the Dip Range
  - coordinates: 41°02′17″S 145°27′24″E
  - elevation: 332 m (1,089 ft)
- Mouth: Bass Strait
  - location: Wiltshire / Black River midpoint
  - coordinates: 40°50′16″S 145°18′49″E
  - elevation: 0 m (0 ft)
- Length: 55.8 km (34.7 mi)

The Black River is a perennial river for most of its length, located in the north-western region of Tasmania, Australia.

== Location and features ==
The river rises below Mount Dipwood (over 530 m (1,740 ft)) (Note: Placename Nomen # for Mount Dipwood = 2129S) in the Dip Range (over 620 m (2,030 ft)), (Note: Placename Nomen # for Dip Range = 2126L) and flows generally north into Bass Strait between the localities of Wiltshire and Black River. The river descends 332 metres (1,089 ft) over its 55.8-kilometre (34.7 mi) course.

== See also ==
- List of rivers of Australia § Tasmania
