= Marrawah =

- Town
- Coordinates: 40°56′S 144°42′E
- Country: Australia
- State: Tasmania
- LGA: Circular Head
- Location: 491 km (305 mi) NW of Hobart

Government
  - State electorate: Braddon
  - Federal division: Braddon

Population
  - Total: 131 (2016 census)
- Postcode: 7330
Localities around Marrawah
Indian Ocean	Woolnorth	West Montagu
Indian Ocean	Marrawah	Redpa
Indian Ocean	Arthur River	Redpa

Marrawah is a small town in the north of the West Coast of Tasmania, Australia. Marrawah is located in the former shire of Wellington, now part of the Circular Head Council area. At the 2006 census, Marrawah had a population of 407.

Marrawah is mainland Tasmania's westernmost settlement and the furthest settlement from Hobart. It is located 491 km (305 mi) north-west of Hobart and 292 km (181 mi) north-west of Launceston and lies at the western end of the A2 sealed road. Marrawah also marked the end of Tasmania's westernmost railway, the Smithton to Marrawah Tramway. Farming, including dairy farming, and tourism are the main commercial activities. The area has several important Aboriginal sites, such as Aboriginal carvings at Mount Cameron West and Sundown Point.

Green Point Beach near Marrawah is also known as a good location for surfing, kitesurfing and windsurfing.

The Woolnorth Wind Farm on Cape Grim is visible in the distance to the north of Marrawah.

== History ==
Marrawah Post Office opened on 1 March 1897. A Marrawah East office opened in 1921, was renamed Redpa in 1926 and closed in 1987.

== Climate ==
Climate data for Marrawah (107 m AMSL; BOM 1971-present)
Month	Jan	Feb	Mar	Apr	May	Jun	Jul	Aug	Sep	Oct	Nov	Dec	Year
Record high °C (°F)	33.2 (91.8)	34.2 (93.6)	29.8 (85.6)	27.0 (80.6)	22.0 (71.6)	18.6 (65.5)	17.0 (62.6)	18.3 (64.9)	23.3 (73.9)	24.7 (76.5)	29.0 (84.2)	30.5 (86.9)	34.2 (93.6)
Mean daily maximum °C (°F)	20.2 (68.4)	20.9 (69.6)	19.4 (66.9)	16.9 (62.4)	14.7 (58.5)	12.9 (55.2)	12.4 (54.3)	12.7 (54.9)	13.7 (56.7)	15.0 (59.0)	16.7 (62.1)	18.4 (65.1)	16.2 (61.2)
Mean daily minimum °C (°F)	12.0 (53.6)	12.5 (54.5)	11.7 (53.1)	10.3 (50.5)	10.3 (50.5)	7.5 (45.5)	6.8 (44.2)	7.0 (44.6)	7.5 (45.5)	8.1 (46.6)	9.3 (48.7)	10.7 (51.3)	9.4 (48.9)
Record low °C (°F)	3.3 (37.9)	4.3 (39.7)	3.5 (38.3)	2.2 (36.0)	1.5 (34.7)	0.0 (32.0)	−0.2 (31.6)	0.2 (32.4)	1.0 (33.8)	1.5 (34.7)	2.2 (36.0)	4.5 (40.1)	−0.2 (31.6)
Average rainfall mm (inches)	47.6 (1.87)	44.8 (1.76)	67.7 (2.67)	84.3 (3.32)	109.6 (4.31)	119.3 (4.70)	142.3 (5.60)	134.4 (5.29)	103.9 (4.09)	85.8 (3.38)	69.3 (2.73)	63.9 (2.52)	1,075.2 (42.33)
Average rainy days (≥ 0.2 mm)	13.6	11.2	15.7	18.6	21.4	22.2	24.4	24.7	22.5	20.0	16.6	16.3	227.2
