= Duck River (Tasmania) =

River in Tasmania, Australia

Coordinates: 40°50′14″S 145°07′17″E

The Duck River is a river in the northern part of Tasmania, which flows through the town of Smithton, before discharging into Duck Bay and then into Bass Strait. An environmental report in 2003 identified high levels of agricultural runoff and lower than usual water flows as a significant ecological problem for the river and its catchment.
