= Smithton, Tasmania =

Smithton
- Town
- Coordinates: 40°50′30″S 145°07′30″E
- Country: Australia
- State: Tasmania
- LGA: Circular Head Council
- Location: 389 km (242 mi) NW of Hobart; 231 km (144 mi) W of Launceston; 132 km (82 mi) W of Devonport; 85 km (53 mi) W of Burnie

Government
  - State electorate: Braddon
  - Federal division: Braddon
- Elevation: 7 m (23 ft)

Population
  - Total: 3,934 (2021 census)
- Postcode: 7330
- Mean max temp: 17.3 °C (63.1 °F)
- Mean min temp: 7.8 °C (46.0 °F)
- Annual rainfall: 899.7 mm (35.42 in)

Smithton is a town on the far north-west coast of Tasmania, Australia. It lies on the Bass Highway, 85 km north-west of Burnie. At the 2021 census, Smithton had a population of 3,934. Smithton is the administrative centre of the Circular Head Council.

== History ==
Duck River Post Office opened on 1 November 1873 and was renamed Smithton in 1895. In 1905 Smithton was declared a town and the Mowbray swamp (now part of the locality of Mella) was drained for dairy pasture. It was here that, in 1920, the 45,000 year old skeleton of a Zygomaturus was discovered.

In 1905, the jetty at Smithton was 1200m long.

The first regular rail service on the Marrawah Tramway started in 1913. In 1919 The Stanley–Trowutta railway commenced services and by 1921 the Smithton to Irishtown link was opened. By 1922 the railway link from Myalla to Wiltshire Junction was completed, thus joining the railways in the municipality to the state system. Smithton High School was opened in 1937, and in 1951 a kindergarten and public hospital were opened in Smithton, and the town began to flourish.

== Economy ==
The economy of Smithton is agriculture based, consisting primarily of dairy and beef farming. Other major industries that contribute to the local economy are fishing, aquaculture, crop farming, timber plantations and tourism.

As it is a major centre in the northwest of the state, several companies have established processing plants in Smithton. Major employers in the town include Greenham Tasmania, who operate a meat processing plant that prepares beef for export to Japan and the United States as well as Australian markets. The plant employs over 120 staff. McCain Foods (Australia) maintain potato storage, processing and freezing facilities in the town for the production of French fries. The McCain plant operates year-round and employs a workforce of 150 from the local community. Two timber mills are also located in Smithton, operated by Britton Bros and Ta Ann Tasmania. Tasmanian Seafoods Pty Ltd operate an abalone processing facility and cannery as well as having their head office located in the town. Also, Murray Goulburn (a dairy company) have offices there.

Tarkine Fresh Oysters (Bolduan Bay Oysters) also run a significant aquaculture facility in Smithton, employing more than 40 people.

== Infrastructure ==
The education community consists of a Catholic independent school, a Christian school and government schools. St Peter Chanel is the local Catholic primary school servicing the community. Circular Head Christian School is the local Christian school, which starts at Kindergarten and goes through to year 12.

The National Broadband Network ran its trial rollout in Tasmanian communities, with Smithton being one of three, with the first customers connected in August 2010.

In 1996, a Cultural Heritage Centre and Museum was started in the old Billett's building in King Street, to preserve many of the artifacts from Smithton's settlement, run by local volunteers. In 2022, it was moved to a modern building on the Agritas site in Nelson Street, known as the Duck River Pavilion. It houses a collection of photos, digitised archives, tools and other day to day memorabilia used in the Circular Head area, hosting different exhibits highlighting different aspects of daily life.

== Climate ==
Smithton has a Mediterranean-influenced oceanic climate (Köppen: Cfb/Csb), with very mild, relatively dry summers and cool, wet winters. Average maxima vary from 22.0 °C (71.6 °F) in February to 13.2 °C (55.8 °F) in July while average minima fluctuate between 11.5 °C (52.7 °F) in February and 4.7 °C (40.5 °F) in July. Mean average annual precipitation is moderate: 899.7 mm (35.42 in), and is strongly concentrated in winter. Due to being windward of the Central Highlands, precipitation is very frequent: spread between 208.3 precipitation days. The town has 183.4 cloudy days and only 38.1 clear days per annum. Extreme temperatures have ranged from 36.6 °C (97.9 °F) on 30 January 2009 to −4.5 °C (23.9 °F) on 19 June 2024. Temperature extremes were combined from the closed Grant Street and the open Smithton Airport weather stations.

Climate data for Smithton (40º49'48"S, 145º04'48"E, 8 m AMSL) (1996-2024 normals, extremes 1962-present)
Month	Jan	Feb	Mar	Apr	May	Jun	Jul	Aug	Sep	Oct	Nov	Dec	Year
Record high °C (°F)	36.6 (97.9)	34.6 (94.3)	32.5 (90.5)	27.5 (81.5)	21.8 (71.2)	18.4 (65.1)	17.6 (63.7)	19.7 (67.5)	23.5 (74.3)	25.5 (77.9)	27.6 (81.7)	30.1 (86.2)	36.6 (97.9)
Mean daily maximum °C (°F)	21.9 (71.4)	22.0 (71.6)	20.5 (68.9)	17.9 (64.2)	15.4 (59.7)	13.7 (56.7)	13.2 (55.8)	13.7 (56.7)	14.9 (58.8)	16.4 (61.5)	18.4 (65.1)	19.8 (67.6)	17.3 (63.2)
Mean daily minimum °C (°F)	11.3 (52.3)	11.5 (52.7)	9.8 (49.6)	7.8 (46.0)	6.3 (43.3)	4.8 (40.6)	4.7 (40.5)	5.2 (41.4)	6.2 (43.2)	7.0 (44.6)	8.7 (47.7)	9.7 (49.5)	7.8 (45.9)
Record low °C (°F)	0.4 (32.7)	0.4 (32.7)	−0.4 (31.3)	−3 (27)	−3.4 (25.9)	−4.5 (23.9)	−4.2 (24.4)	−3.2 (26.2)	−2.3 (27.9)	−1.2 (29.8)	−0.6 (30.9)	−0.7 (30.7)	−4.5 (23.9)
Average precipitation mm (inches)	40.3 (1.59)	33.1 (1.30)	53.9 (2.12)	60.2 (2.37)	89.0 (3.50)	95.4 (3.76)	118.6 (4.67)	122.5 (4.82)	94.8 (3.73)	79.7 (3.14)	58.9 (2.32)	55.3 (2.18)	899.7 (35.42)
Average precipitation days (≥ 0.2 mm)	10.4	9.2	12.9	17.0	21.5	21.5	24.2	23.8	21.2	19.0	14.1	13.5	208.3
Average afternoon relative humidity (%)	60	61	61	67	74	75	74	73	70	64	64	62	67
Average dew point °C (°F)	11.6 (52.9)	12.2 (54.0)	10.8 (51.4)	9.7 (49.5)	9.2 (48.6)	7.9 (46.2)	7.3 (45.1)	7.2 (45.0)	7.5 (45.5)	7.7 (45.9)	9.5 (49.1)	10.1 (50.2)	9.2 (48.6)
Source: Bureau of Meteorology (1996-2024 normals, extremes 1962-1997)

== Notable people ==
Noted former Smithtonians include:

- Hannah Gadsby (born in Smithton, 1978), comedian, winner of the Edinburgh Comedy Awards in 2017
- Enid Lyons (born in Smithton, 1897), first woman elected to the Australian House of Representatives
- Don Kay (born in Smithton, 1933), composer and professor of music
