= Hellyer =

Henry Hellyer was an explorer in north west Tasmania during the 1820s.

Places in the region named after him include:

- Hellyer Gorge
- Hellyer College, college in Tasmania, Australia
- Hellyer County Park
  - Hellyer Park Velodrome, a velodrome in Hellyer County Park
- Hellyer River

Other notable people named Hellyer include:

- Albert Hellyer (died 1945), Canadian politician
- Arthur Hellyer (1902–1993), British horticulturist
- Arthur Lawrence Hellyer Jr. (1923–2018), radio host
- H. A. Hellyer, British academic and author on European affairs and relations with the Muslim world
- Jill Hellyer (1925–2012), Australian poet and writer
- Jonathan Hellyer (born 1967), English singer, theatre director and drag actor
- Paul Hellyer (1923–2021), Canadian politician and Minister of National Defence
- Peter Hellyer (1947–2023), British film-maker, journalist, historian and archaeologist
- Thomas Hellyer (1840–1889), 19th-century Australian politician
- Thomas Hellyer (architect) (1811–1894), 19th-century English architect
- William Hellyer (died 1885), Australian politician
