= Nut =

Nut often refers to:

- Nut (fruit), composed of a hard shell and a seed
- Nut (food), a dry and edible fruit or seed, including but not limited to true nuts
- Nut (hardware), fastener used with a bolt

Nut, Nuts, NUT or NUTS may also refer to:

== Arts, entertainment, and media ==
=== Comics ===
- Nuts, in the National Lampoon by Gahan Wilson (1970s)
- Nuts, strip in alternative newspapers by M. Wartella (1990s)

=== Fictional characters ===
- Nut (Marvel Comics), evoking the Egyptian sky goddess
- Nut (movie character), character portrayed by Shing Fui-On in two late 20th-century Hong Kong crime films
- Nuts, from the animated series Shaun the Sheep

=== Films ===
- Nuts (1987 film), American drama
- Nuts (2012 film), French comedy
- Nuts! (film), animated documentary on John R. Brinkley

=== Television ===
- NBC Universal Television Studio, or NUTS, former name of television arm of NBCUniversal / Universal Television
- Nuts TV, British television channel related to Nuts magazine

=== Other uses in arts, entertainment, and media ===
- Nut (album), by KT Tunstall
- Nuts (album), by Kevin Gilbert
- Nuts! (book), 1996, about Southwest Airlines
- Nuts (American magazine), US fashion magazine
- Nuts (British magazine), UK men's weekly
- Nuts (play), 1979, by Tom Topor
- "Nuts" (song), by Lil Peep
- "Nuts", song by Brooke Candy and Lil Aaron

== Health ==
- NUT carcinoma, rare, very aggressive cancer

== Institutions and organisations ==
- National Union of Teachers or NUT, former British trade union for school teachers
- Norwegian University of Science and Technology or NUT
- NUT (studio), anime studio

== Instruments and mechanical tools ==
- Nut (climbing), metal device for wedging in rock crevices
- Nut, moving element of a ball screw
- Nut (string instrument), device supporting and stabilizing strings near the headstock of a violin or guitar

== Science and technology ==
- 306367 Nut, Apollo asteroid (1960)
- Network UPS Tools or NUT
- No U-Turn Sampler or NUTS, algorithm
- Nuclear utilization target selection or NUTS, theory regarding nuclear weaponry
- NUT Container, FFmpeg format
- Nomenclature of Territorial Units for Statistics, a European Union system of multiple layers of geographical divisions

== Slang ==
- An insane person
- Nut hand or "the nuts", poker term for an unbeatable hand
- Human testicles
- Semen or ejaculation
- Cost of living, as popularized by the South Park episode "Got a Nut"

== Other uses ==
- Nuts, a hazelnut chocolate bar by Nestlé
- Nut (goddess), the Egyptian goddess of the sky
- "Nut", an informal term in typography for a width of 1 en
- Modesto Nuts, minor league baseball team in Modesto, California, US
- No U-turn syndrome or NUTS, term describing Singaporean culture
- NUT Motorcycles, Newcastle-upon-Tyne motorcycle manufacturer
- "Nuts!", U.S. Army General Anthony McAuliffe's refusal-to-surrender message during the World War II German siege of Bastogne
- Nutty slack, cheap fuel consisting of slack (coal dust) and small lumps of coal (nuts) (British English)
- The Nut (Tasmania), volcanic plug near the town of Stanley, Australia

== See also ==
- Nutcase (disambiguation)
- Nut grass (disambiguation)
- Nut job (disambiguation)
- Nutcracker (disambiguation)
- Nutt (disambiguation)
- Nutter (disambiguation)
- The Nut (disambiguation)
