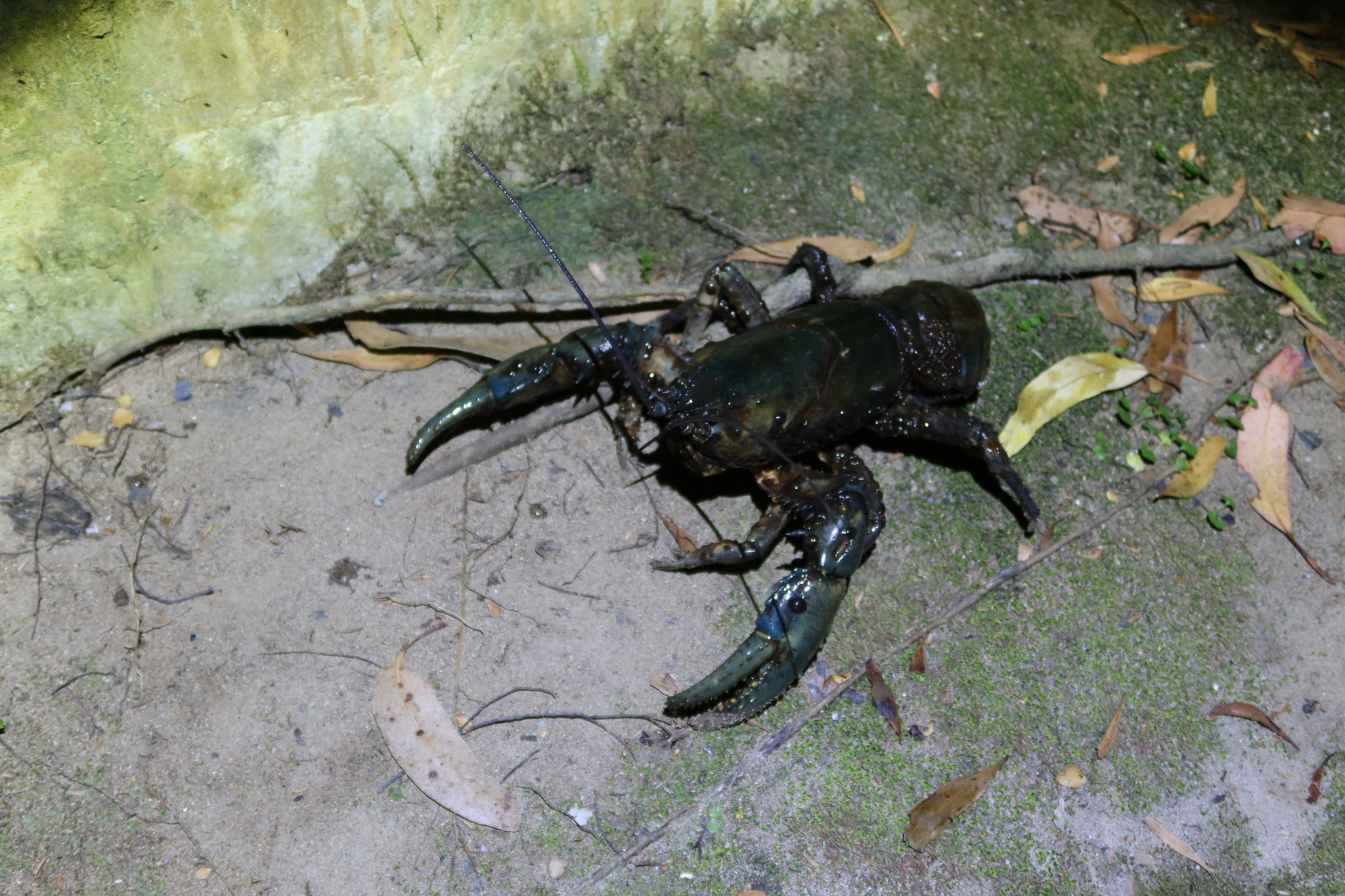

Conservation status
- Endangered (IUCN 3.1)

Scientific classification
- Kingdom: Animalia
- Phylum: Arthropoda
- Clade: Pancrustacea
- Class: Malacostraca
- Order: Decapoda
- Suborder: Pleocyemata
- Family: Parastacidae
- Genus: Astacopsis
- Species: A. gouldi

Binomial name
- Astacopsis gouldi Clark, 1936
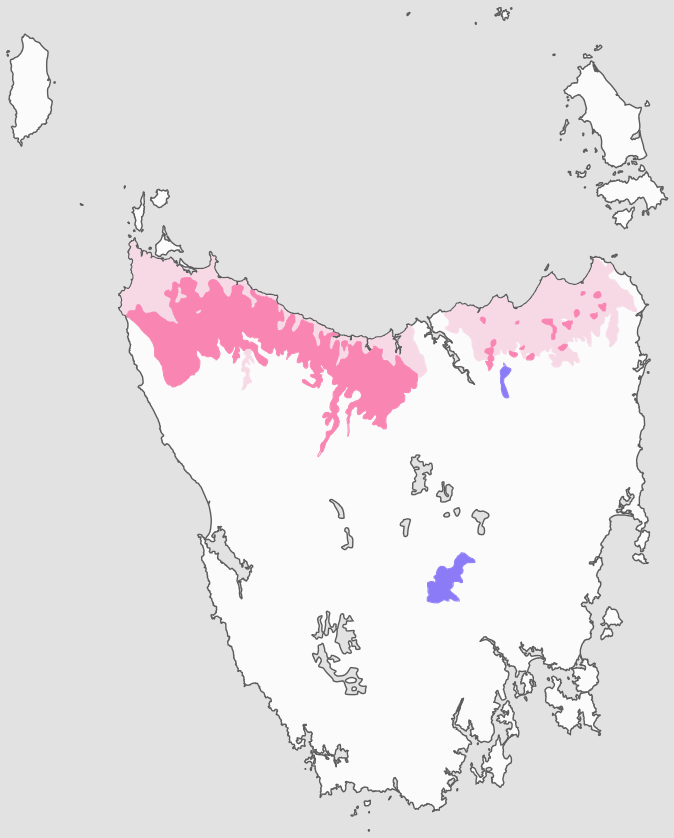
- Modelled distribution of Astacopsis gouldi Magenta: species likely to occur Light pink: species may occur Purple: translocated populations

= Tasmanian giant freshwater crayfish =

Astacopsis gouldi

Species of crayfish

The Tasmanian giant freshwater crayfish (Astacopsis gouldi), also called Tasmanian giant freshwater lobster, is the largest freshwater invertebrate and the largest freshwater crayfish species in the world. It is found in the rivers below 400 metres (1,300 ft) above sea level in northern Tasmania, Australia. It is listed as an endangered species on the IUCN Red List due to overfishing and habitat degradation, and it has been prohibited to catch it since 1998.

The diet of the freshwater crayfish varies with age, but predominantly consists of decaying wood, leaves and their associated microbes. They may also eat small fish, insects, rotting animal flesh and other detritus when available. A. gouldi is very long-lived, surviving for up to 60 years. It has previously been reported to attain weights of up to 6 kilograms (13 lb) and measure over 80 centimetres (31 in) long; however, in recent years the majority of larger specimens are 2–3 kilograms (4.4–6.6 lb). When full-grown the species has no natural predators due to its large size, while smaller individuals can be prey of platypus, river blackfish and rakali.

== Name ==
Although a crayfish, the species is locally known as the giant freshwater lobster. In Tasmanian Aboriginal language (palawa kani) the giant freshwater lobster is referred to as lutaralipina. Previously, it has been common to use 'tayatea' as the Aboriginal name for A. gouldi. However, historical record does not support the use of this word for this species. The palawa kani Language Program of the Tasmanian Aboriginal Centre has revived 'lutaralipina' (pronounced: lu-tar-rah-lee-pee-nah) as the appropriate Tasmanian Aboriginal term for the giant freshwater crayfish (A. gouldi); and 'tayatitja' (pronounced: tie-yah-tee-tchah) for the small southern freshwater crayfish (A. franklinii).

The specific epithet of the scientific name, Astacopsis gouldi, honours the first Tasmanian Government Geological Surveyor Charles Gould (1834-1893), son of the 19th century English ornithologist John Gould and natural history illustrator Elizabeth Gould (née Coxen). Charles Gould was an amateur naturalist and member of the Royal Society of Tasmania who published observations on the giant freshwater lobster's distribution, diet and habits in 1870. Astacopsis gouldi was first formally described in 1936 by Ellen Clark, a naturalist specialising in Australia's crustaceans. Prior to Clark's revision in 1936, all three of Tasmania's large stream-dwelling crayfish of the genus Astacopsis were collectively known as Astacopsis franklinii in honour of the polar explorer and Governor of Van Diemen's Land Sir John Franklin.

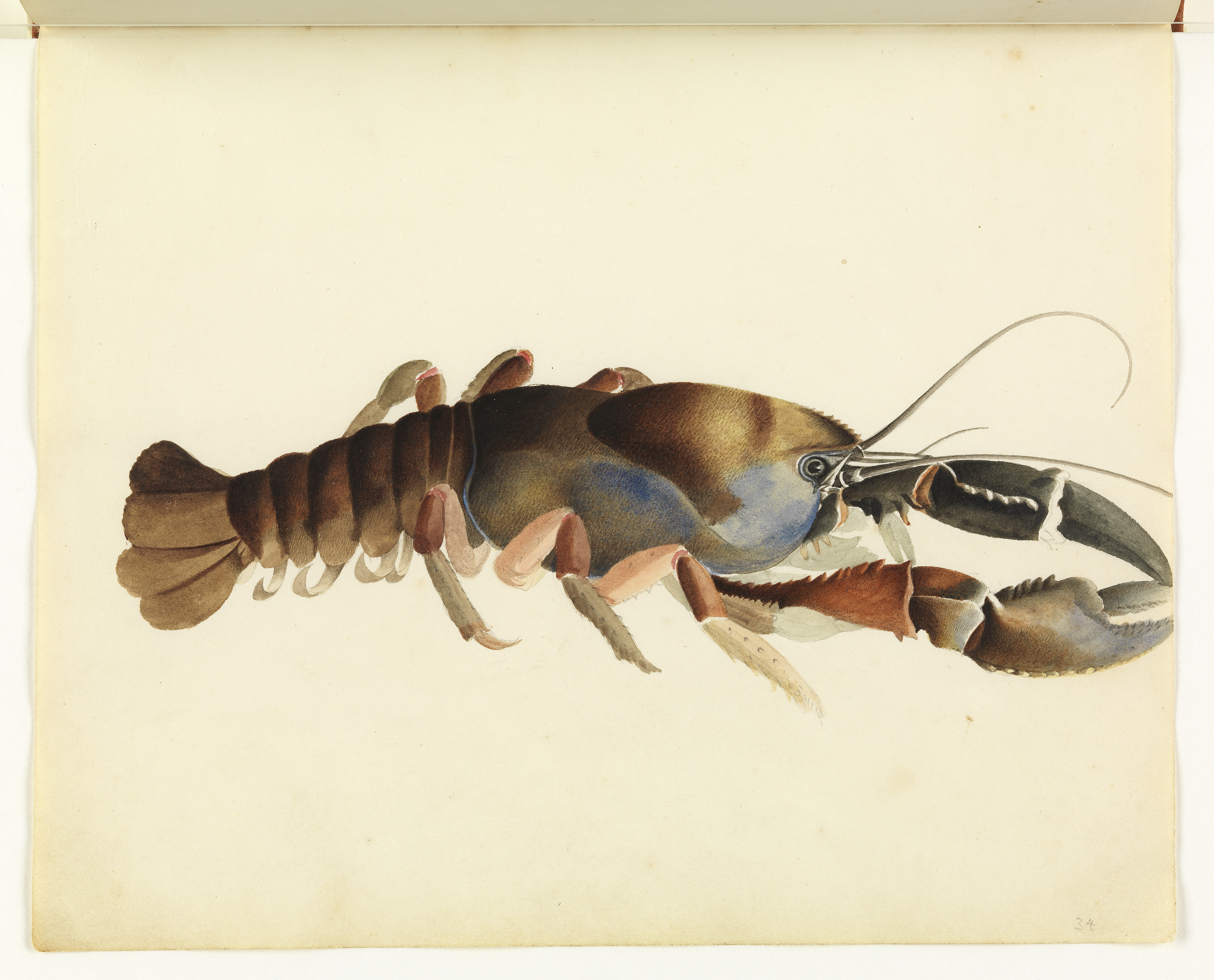
The watercolour sketch

Astacopsis franklinii now refers only to the smaller southern species, while the medium-sized western species is known as Astacopsis tricornis and Astacopis gouldi refers exclusively to the giant northern crayfish. It is a common misconception that A. gouldi is named after the convict artist William Buelow Gould. WB Gould's "Sketchbook of fishes" produced at the Macquarie Harbour penal settlement contains an image of the large western Tasmanian freshwater crayfish A. tricornis not A. gouldi.

== Biology and ecology ==
A. gouldi are omnivorous crustacean, primarily eating decaying wood, leaves and their associated microbes. They may also eat small fish, insects, rotting animal flesh and other detritus when available. Colour varies considerably among individuals, with adults ranging from dark brown-green to black or blue. For undetermined reasons, populations in the Frankland River system on the West Coast are predominantly found to be blue-white in colour. Males can be identified by their larger pincers compared to females. Young juveniles moult several times a year, becoming less frequent as they mature. The species is long lived and known to live up to 60 years of age and attain weights of up to 6 kilograms (13 lb), however in recent years specimens of 2–3 kilograms (4.4–6.6 lb) are considered large.

Results from a genetic study indicated that specimens of A. gouldi from a site in the Pipers River catchment (north of Launceston) were significantly genetically distinct from the rest of the species.

=== Behaviour ===
The dispersal and migratory patterns of A. gouldi are largely unknown, but they are recorded to be most active during summer and autumn when water temperatures are higher, they are also known to walk over land. A 2004 study found the species appears to have periods of relative inactivity restricted to a "home-pool" for 1–10 days interspersed with movements involving travel over relatively large distances, including one crayfish moving over 700 m in a single night.

Juveniles are suspected to migrate to seasonal creeks or shallow faster-flowing waters known as riffle zones where they are at less risk from predators including other crayfish, fish, platypus and rakali. Larger sub-adults (<100 millimetres (3.9 in) carapace length) will move to deeper-flowing straight sections of the catchment. Adults have no natural predators and will take refuge in sheltered deep pools and appear to tolerate each other despite being aggressive elsewhere. Males are territorial and maintain a harem of up to several females.

=== Reproduction ===
Tasmanian giant freshwater crayfish have extremely slow maturation rates, with females reaching sexual maturity at approximately 14 years of age, a weight of 550 grams (19 oz) and a carapace length of 120 millimetres (4.7 in). Males are thought to reach maturity more quickly at around 9 years, 300 grams (11 oz) and 76 millimetres (3.0 in) carapace length.

Females mate and spawn once every two years in autumn after a summer moult, producing 224–1300 eggs proportional to its size. Gestation of the eggs takes about nine months, with females carrying the eggs on their tail through winter. After hatching in mid-summer, the hatchlings of about 6 millimetres (0.24 in) attach to the female's swimming legs and will remain with the mother until a few months later in autumn. A long reproductive process means that females spend much of their life attached to their eggs and hatchlings.

== Distribution and habitat ==
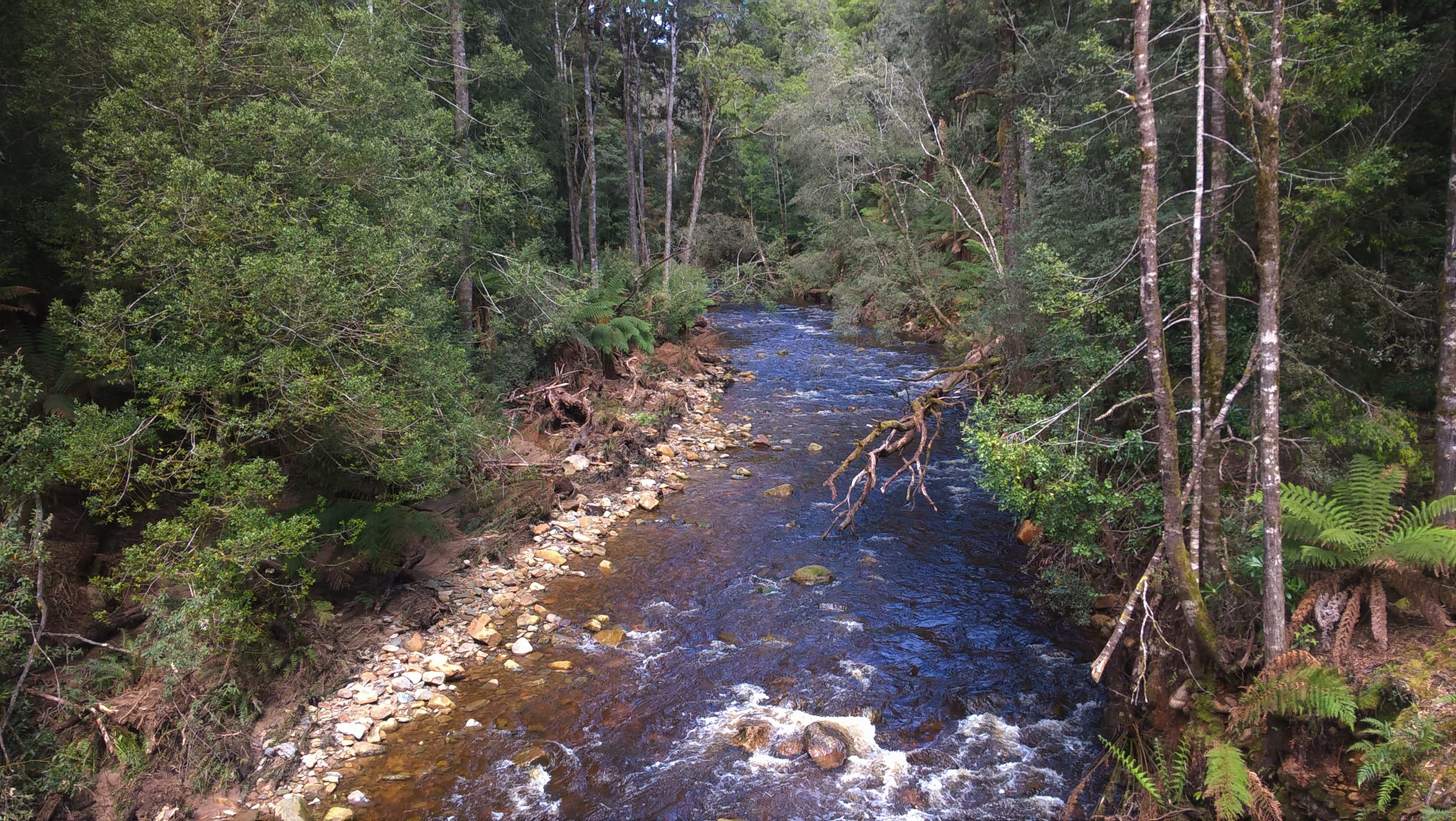
Flowerdale River, Meunna, North West Tasmania. A waterway ecosystem where Astacopsis gouldi is likely to occur

=== Distribution ===
A. gouldi inhabit rivers and streams at elevations of approximately 20–300 metres (66–984 ft) above sea level, with upper limits of 400 metres (1,300 ft). Approximately 18% of the waterways in which the species habitat is predicted to occur are protected in a formal reserve.

Formerly, the species was distributed from the Arthur River in the west and eastwards across northern Tasmania, where it was found in all rivers flowing into Bass Strait, except for those of the Tamar catchment. Despite the two disjunct ranges, populations across these are genetically similar. The species has been introduced into the North Esk (St Patricks River) and the Derwent catchments where populations have become established. Today, distribution of A. gouldi is fragmented and limited to less disturbed areas. Large declines in numbers or localised extinctions are thought to have occurred in the Welcome, Montagu, Rubicon, Don, Brid, Boobyalla, Pipers, Ringarooma, Duck, Little and Great Forester Rivers and Claytons Rivulet. Eastern populations are particularly reduced.

=== Habitat ===
A. gouldi inhabit slow-moving rivers and streams of several sizes including headwaters and rivulets. Water should be of high quality with high dissolved oxygen content, little suspended sediment, and water temperatures between 5.2–21 °C (41.4–69.8 °F), although relatively low temperatures are preferred. Adults need still, deep pools with submerged decaying logs and overhanging, but not eroding, banks to shelter beneath. Juveniles prefer shallow, faster-flowing stream habitats with distinct cavities to hide under and higher portions of bolder substrate and moss cover.

Excellent habitat requires intact, native riparian vegetation which is densely canopied and shades the waterways. However, the species has been recorded in confines of non-native riparian vegetation (e.g. pine plantations), without riparian vegetation and in farm dams. A 1994 study failed to find crayfish in waterways of established agricultural areas where all riparian vegetation had been removed.

== Commercial importance ==
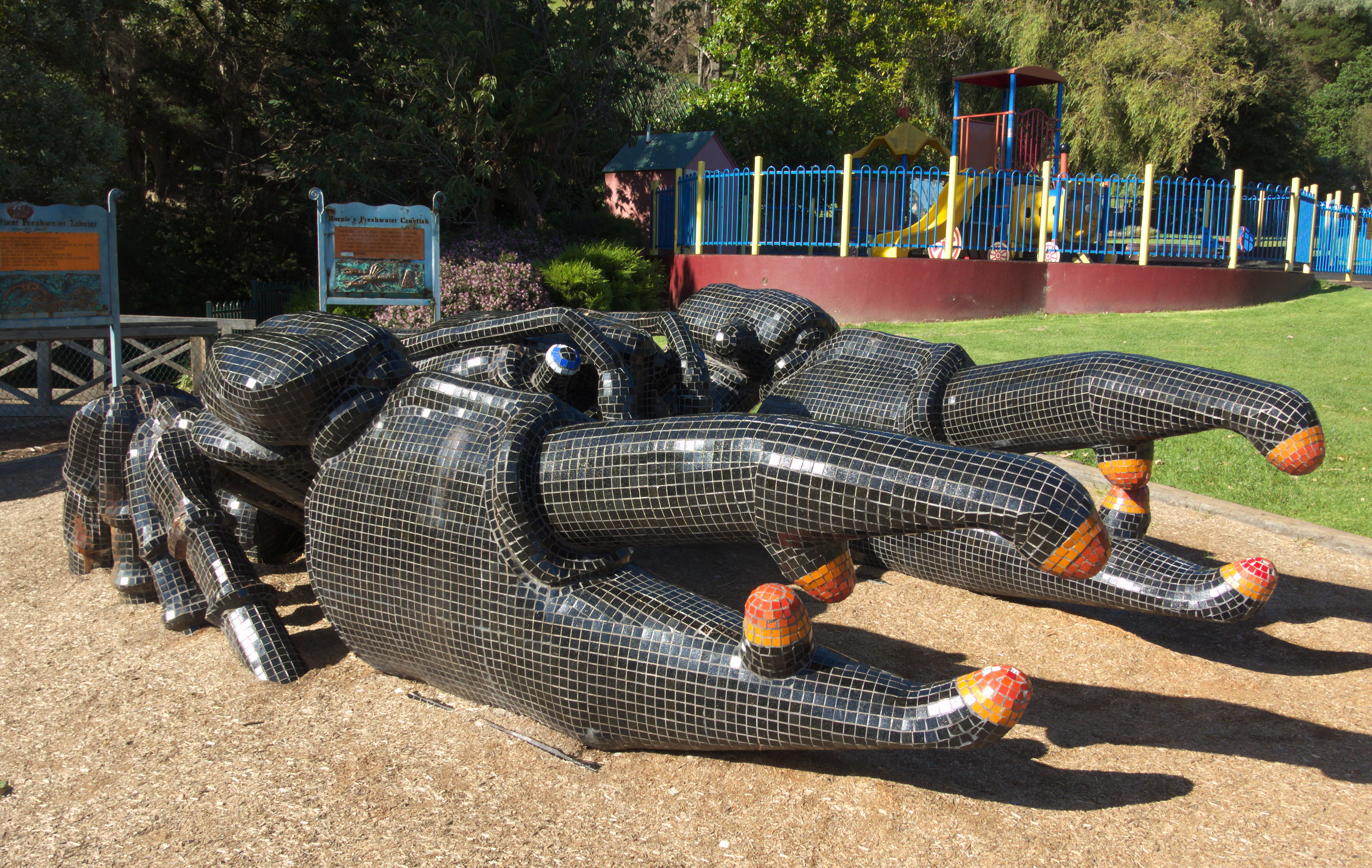
Sculpture of a giant freshwater lobster in Burnie Park.

Fishing for the giant freshwater crayfish was never a commercial proposition, and its slow growth and aggressive nature suggest that the species is not suitable for aquaculture. As an edible animal, they are further disadvantaged of being so spiny that they can cut hands if carelessly shelled after cooking, and they yield little meat relative to total weight. However, the striking nature of the species makes it a potential tourism drawcard. The Lobster Ponds Haven, a community run refuge for the lobsters, at Flowerdale near Wynyard receives around 1650 tourists a year.

== Threats and conservation ==
The principal causes for the population declines of the Tasmanian giant freshwater crayfish have been previous overfishing, continued illegal fishing and habitat disturbance by agriculture, forestry and urban activities. Experts estimate there are less than 100,000 remaining in the wild. Land clearing typically requires approval with a Forest Practices Plan and 10m streamside buffers. Until recently, buffer zones only prohibited machinery operating near waterways with harvesting and burning permitted up to the stream edge.

A. gouldi is protected under the federal government Environment Protection and Biodiversity Conservation Act 1999 and Tasmanian state government Threatened Species Protection Act 1995 which prohibit the fishing or handling of the species without permit. The effectiveness of some current conservation efforts are not fully determined and are subject to review in the 2016 Recovery Plan. Population surveys and behavioural research are being undertaken in order to be able to provide improved habitat management and protection.

=== Overfishing and illegal fishing ===
The relative ease of catch, slow maturation (14 years for females), infrequent breeding (once every 2 years) and the removal of young when females are caught make A. gouldi highly susceptible to human fishing pressures. The larger individuals were targeted for eating and trophies, which has had a significant effect on breeding stock, completely removing populations from some river systems. The lack of any bag limit until the 1990s allowed overfishing to occur for many years.

In 1998, the species was listed as "vulnerable" under Australian law and an amendment to the Inland Fisheries Act 1995 made it illegal to catch or handle A. gouldi without a permit, carrying a maximum fine of A$10,000. Although past fishing pressures are believed to have had a significant impact on populations, a degree of illegal fishing is known to continue and has potential to significantly threaten the remaining populations. The level of illegal fishing is not fully known, but is evidenced by prosecutions, the presence of bait lines and anecdotal reports. New developments of fire roads and double track trails can consequentially allow illegal fishers to access previously unexploited populations.

=== Habitat disturbance ===
Habitat disturbance for A. gouldi includes the removal or destruction of native riparian vegetation, bank erosion, removal of snags, stream flow alterations such as culverts and farm dams, siltation and toxic chemical runoffs.

The clearance of riparian vegetation causes the destabilisation of waterway banks, which impacts the burrowing habitats for A. gouldi and increases sediment runoff into waterways. Increased sediment levels arising from agricultural and forestry related land-uses have been correlated with decreased abundances of freshwater crayfish. The increase in turbidity impacts the ability of the crayfish to effectively transpire oxygen through its gills. Sediment depositions arising from upstream forestry operations have been observed to impact in-stream habitat for considerable distances downstream of up to 10 km. Loss of riparian canopy cover allows more light to reach the water and has a negative impact on habitat by increasing water temperatures.

While Tasmanian river basins have been found to be generally less impacted by flow alterations than other catchments across Australia, some river basins (such as the Mersey and Pipers–Ringarooma river basins) are heavily impacted by hydro-electric schemes, with the use of in-stream barriers reducing the dispersal potential of the crayfish. Water extraction for irrigated agriculture and urban water use is of concern to a lesser degree, however there has been an identified lack of contingency plans in the event of reduced environmental flows in waterways. Anecdotal reports indicate that low environmental flows caused the death of giant freshwater crayfish in several catchments in the north-west and north-east of Tasmania in 2006–07

=== Notable events ===
In 1994, a large spill from a holding dam at a pyrethrum extraction plant caused a major kill in the Hogarth Rivulet and the main channel of the Great Forester River. Reports from locals and fisheries officers suggested that there was little life left in much of the main channel, and the incident is believed to have severely harmed any populations that were in the waterways at the time of the spill.

The 2016 Tasmanian floods, which killed 3 people, raised concerns about the future for the Tasmanian giant freshwater crayfish after up to 100 carcasses were found washed up along the banks of the Leven River on a property in North West Tasmania, likely caused by the high water flows during the flood. Previous population surveys in the area had revealed already low numbers. There are further concerns that the floods displaced snags from waterways which are a vital part of the habitat for the species.

=== Identified important locations ===
The 2006–2010 Giant Freshwater Lobster Recovery Plan highlighted several catchments (or parts of) which had been identified to contain good habitat quality and good crayfish populations and should be considered for conservation efforts. Some areas require renewed evaluation since habitat quality may have changed since surveys were conducted. North-eastern Tasmanian rivers lacked sufficient data to fully determine all areas of importance.

==== 1997 ====
- Aitken Creek, downstream of Nook Road to Sheffield Road crossing
- Black River and tributaries
- Dip Range streams
- Duck River catchment above Trowutta Road
- Emu River tributaries
- Flowerdale River from the top of the catchment to near Lapoinya
- Great Forester River and tributaries
- Inglis River and tributaries
- Little Forester River and tributaries

==== 2003 ====
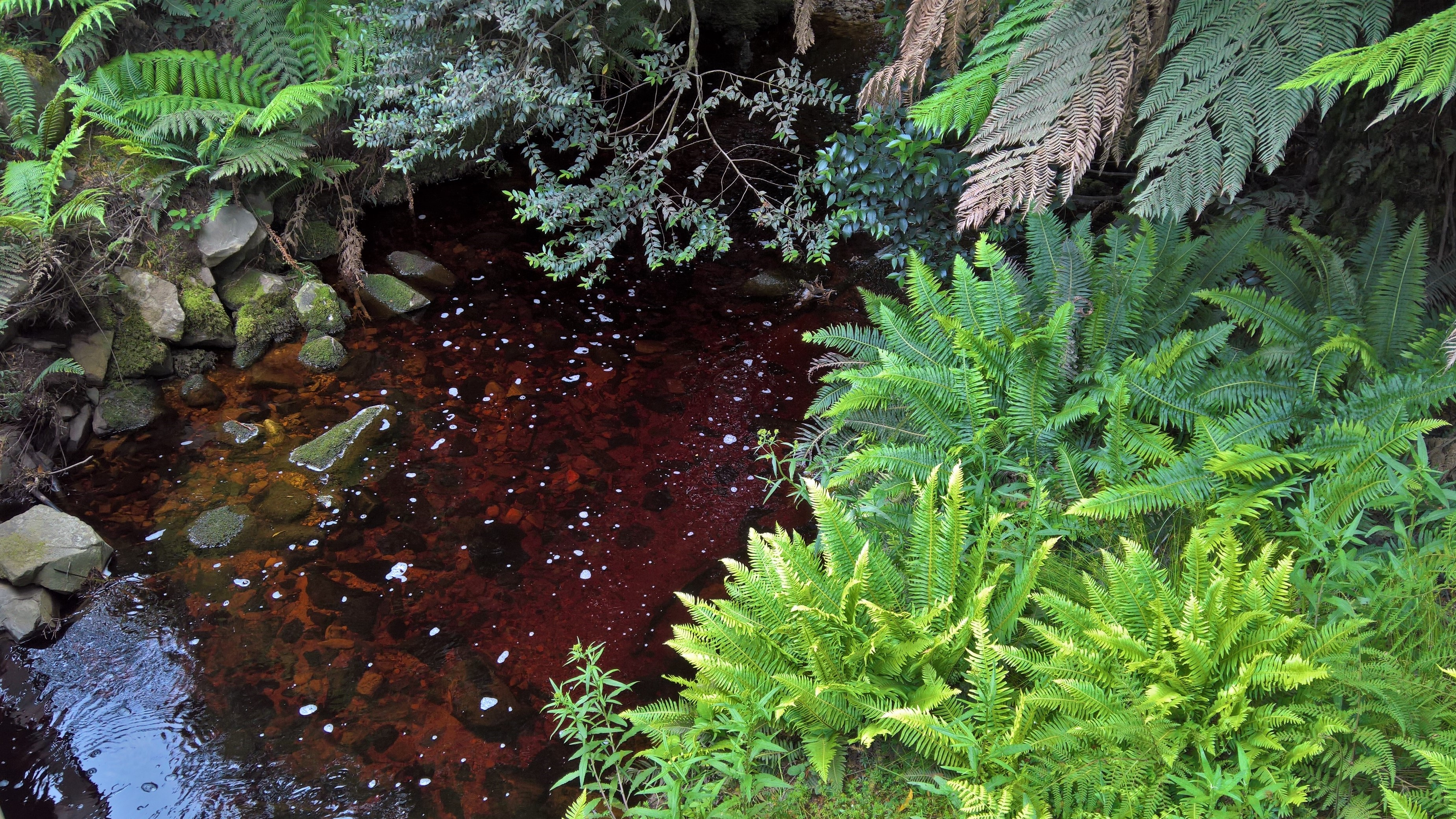
Hebe River at Lobbs Bridge, Milabena

- Cam River catchment
- Hebe River (catchment of Flowerdale River)
- Arthur River catchments including Frankland, Rapid, Keith and Lyons rivers

== See also ==
- Fauna of Australia
- Flora and fauna of Tasmania
- Murray crayfish
- Threatened fauna of Australia
- Tenuibranchiurus - world's smallest crayfish, also found in Australia
