= Arthur River =

Arthur River may refer to:

- Arthur River (New Zealand), a river
- Arthur River (Tasmania), a river
- Arthur River, Tasmania, a town in Australia
- Arthur River (Western Australia), a river
- Arthur River, Western Australia, a small town on the river of the same name
