= Nutcase =

Nutcase or nut case is a slang term for an odd or insane person. It may also refer to:

- Nutcase (film), a 1980 New Zealand film
- Nutcase, an occasional member of the Australian electronic music group Itch-E and Scratch-E
- "Nutcase", a song by British punk rock band Leatherface from the 2010 album The Stormy Petrel
- "Nutcase", An episode of the American TV series Coconut Fred's Fruit Salad Island!
- Nutcase, a 2009 novel by American author Charlotte Hughes
- Nutcase, a 2017 novel by British author Tony Williams
- Cast Nutcase, a puzzle toy designed and produced by Hanayama

== See also ==
- Nutter (disambiguation)
- Nut job (disambiguation)
- Nut (disambiguation)
