= The Nut =

The Nut may refer to:

- The Nut, an old extinct volcano near Stanley, Tasmania, a town on the north-west coast of Tasmania, Australia.
- The Nut (1921 film), an American film produced by, and starring, Douglas Fairbanks
