= Nut job =

Nut job or nutjob may refer to:

== Film and television ==
- The Nut Job, a 2014 Canadian-South Korean animated film
- "Nut Job", a 2013 episode of Deal with It
- "Nut Job", a 2012 episode of American Restoration
- "Nut Job", a 2003 episode of The Bernie Mac Show

== See also ==
- "Nut Job of the Week", a segment on the Australian TV show The Chaser's War on Everything
- Nut case (disambiguation)
- Nutter (disambiguation)
- Nut (disambiguation)
- Job (disambiguation)
