= Frankland River =

Frankland River may refer to:

- Frankland River, Western Australia, a town in Western Australia
- Frankland River (Western Australia), a river in Western Australia
- Frankland River (North West Tasmania), a river in Tasmania
