= Nutt =

Nutt is an English surname. Notable people with the surname include:

- Alfred Nutt (1856–1910), British publisher
- Alfred Young Nutt (1847–1924), English architect and artist
- Commodore Nutt (1844–1881), American dwarf who worked for P. T. Barnum
- Danny Nutt, American football coach
- David Nutt, British scientist
  - David Nutt (disambiguation); multiple people
- Dennis Nutt, American basketball player
- Dickey Nutt, American basketball coach
- Duane Nutt (1933–2026), American football coach
- Edwin C. Nutt (1868–1933), American farmer and politician
- Elizabeth and John Nutt, English printers (fl. early 18th c.)
- Eliza Hall Nutt, American philanthropist and schoolteacher
- Emma Nutt, first female telephone switchboard operator
- Gordon Nutt (1932–2014), English footballer
- Grady Nutt, American writer
- Houston Nutt, American football coach
- Jim Nutt, American artist
- John Nutt, English pirate
  - John Nutt (disambiguation); multiple people
- Levi G. Nutt (1866–1938), American Treasury Department agent
- Mart Nutt (1962–2019), Estonian politician and historian
- Roy Nutt, American businessman
- Samantha Nutt, Canadian co-founder of War Child Canada
- William Nutt (1836–1909), American Civil War colonel

== See also ==
- Nut (disambiguation)
- Nutt. taxonomic author abbreviation of Thomas Nuttall (1786–1859), English botanist
- Nutt, New Mexico
