= David Nutt (disambiguation) =

David Nutt (born 1951) is a British psychiatrist and neuropsychopharmacologist.

David Nutt may also refer to:

- David Nutt (publisher) (died 1868), English publisher
- David H. Nutt, American lawyer and philanthropist

== See also ==
- Nutt
