= Nutter (surname) =

Nutter is an English occupational surname for either a keeper of oxen or a scribe or a clerk. Notable people with the surname include:

- Adam Nutter, English guitarist
- Alan Nutter (1920–1994), Australian football player
- Albert Nutter (1913–1996), English cricketer
- Alice Nutter (alleged witch) (died 1612), English woman hanged during the Pendle witch trials
- Alice Nutter (writer) (born 1962), British singer and percussionist
- Buzz Nutter (1931–2008), American football player
- Christopher Lee Nutter (born 1970), American journalist and author
- Dave Nutter (born 1955), American politician from Virginia
- David Nutter (born 1960), American film director
- Dizzy Nutter (1893–1958), American baseball player
- Donald Grant Nutter (1915–1962), American politician
- Edna May Oliver (1883–1942), née Nutter, American actress
- Ezra Nutter (1858–1903), English cricketer
- Frederick Nutter (1929–2005), stage name Rik Van Nutter, American actor
- G. Warren Nutter (1923–1979), American economist
- Geoffrey Nutter, American poet
- Gerry Nutter (1928–2016), Australian diplomat
- Harold Nutter (1923–2017), Canadian Anglican bishop
- Harry Nutter (1901–1983), English footballer
- Janet Nutter (born 1953), Canadian diver
- John Nutter (born 1982), English footballer
- Michael Nutter (born 1957), American politician
- Robert Nutter (c. 1550–1600), English Catholic priest
- Sarah Meriwether Nutter (1888–1950), American educator
- Tommy Nutter (1943–1992), Welsh fashion designer
- T. Gillis Nutter (1876–c. 1950), American attorney, businessman, and politician
- Warren John Nutter (1937–2021), American murderer
- Zoe Dell Nutter (1915–2020), American aviator and model

== See also ==
- Nutter (disambiguation)
