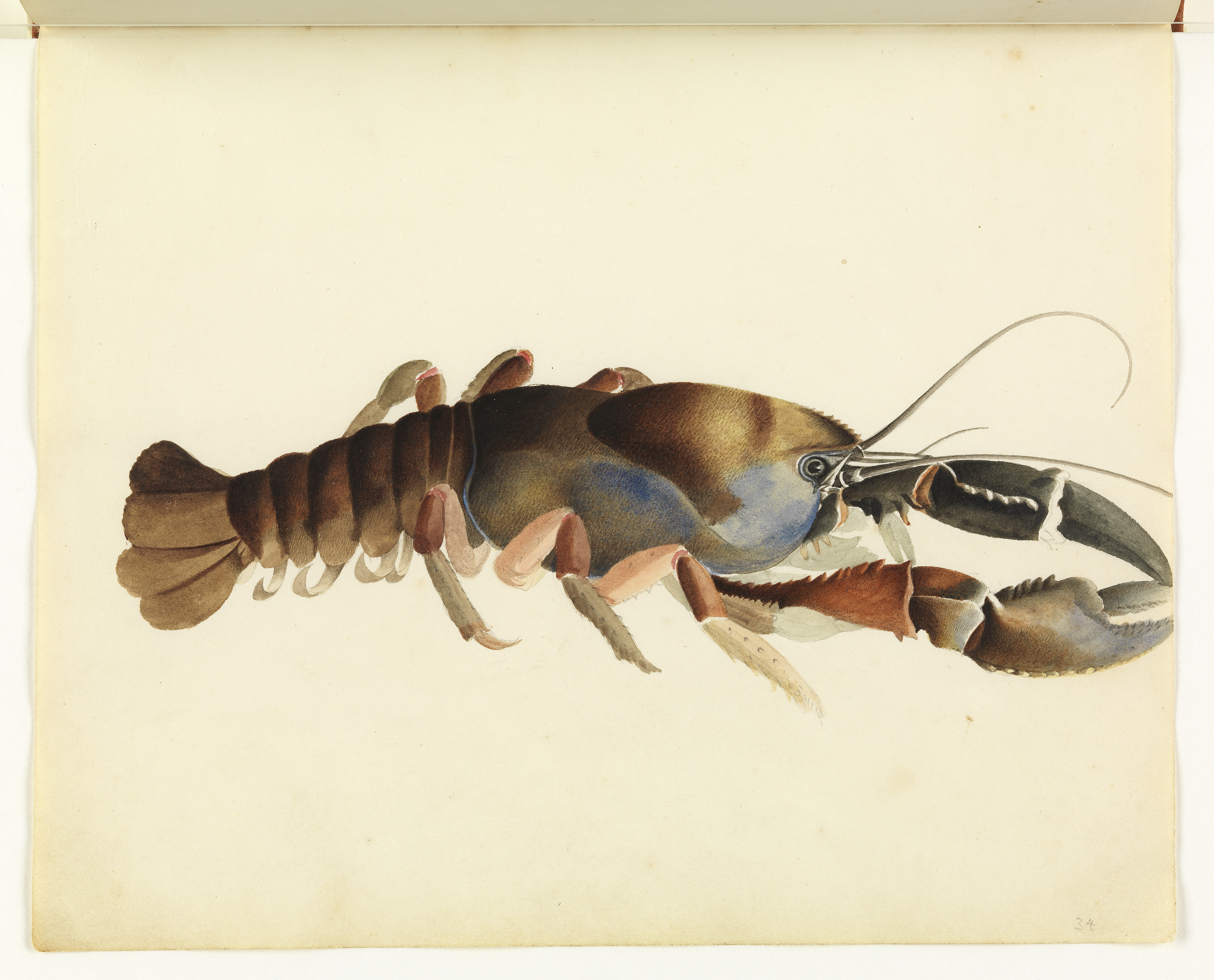
- Watercolour of Astacopsis tricornis from "Sketchbook of fishes" by WB Gould

Scientific classification
- Kingdom: Animalia
- Phylum: Arthropoda
- Class: Malacostraca
- Order: Decapoda
- Suborder: Pleocyemata
- Superfamily: Parastacoidea
- Family: Parastacidae
- Genus: Astacopsis; Huxley, 1879
- Astacopsis distribution

= Astacopsis =

Genus of crayfishes

Astacopsis is a genus of crayfish endemic to the island of Tasmania. There are three extant species, Astacopsis gouldi, Astacopsis franklinii, and Astacopsis tricornis. All are threatened by illegal harvesting, and A. gouldi is protected by law. A. franklinii is found in the eastern half of the island, with A. tricornis taking its place in the west. A. gouldi is found only in rivers draining into the Bass Strait, except for the Tamar River.

The three species were named by naturalist Ellen Clark in 1936. Prior to Clark's revision, all three species were collectively known as Astacopsis franklinii. The most famous depiction of a crayfish of the genus Astacopsis is in the "Sketchbook of fishes" by convict artist William Buelow Gould, painted at the Macquarie Harbour penal station circa 1832. Based on the location of observation and morphology evident in the image the specimen Gould painted was A. tricornis.

Contrary to popular belief, A. gouldi was not named after WB Gould, but was named by Ellen Clark after the first Tasmanian Government Geological Surveyor Charles Gould, who published observations on giant freshwater crayfish distribution, diet and habits in 1870.

== Extant Species ==
Image	Scientific name	Common name	Distribution
	Astacopsis gouldi	Tasmanian giant freshwater crayfish	northern Tasmania
	Astacopsis franklinii		Eastern Tasmania
	Astacopsis tricornis		Western Tasmania
