= Henry Hellyer =

English surveyor and architect

Henry Hellyer (1790 – c. 1 September 1832) was an English surveyor and architect who was one of the first European explorers to visit the rugged interior of the north west of Tasmania, Australia and made the most comprehensive maps of the area up to that time.

== Life ==
Henry Hellyer was descended from Hellyers living in the area of Portsmouth in England. Nothing is known about his early life or where he was trained as an architect and surveyor, but it seems that the family were able to afford to educate their children well. His older brother William Varlo Hellyer was a lawyer in London and Secretary of the Royal Institution in 1841. A copy of a letter written by Henry in 1830 to William Varlo's Hellyer's wife, Mary Vuliamy was deposited by a Canadian descendant of William and Mary in the Hellyer Regional Library (now the Burnie Library.) Henry himself had no direct descendants.

When the Van Diemen's Land Company was formed in 1825 he was one of the first officers to sign on, as a surveyor (later Chief Surveyor) and Chief Architect. His achievements in Tasmania are well documented, and the Court of Directors of the VDL Co in London noted his resignation (March 1832) as follows: "Mr Hellyer, whose valuable services have been so great and whose name is so well known both to the Colonial Government and at home, by his unwearied exertions for the company, by his personal privation and risk in exploring the country, and by the admirable maps and plans which have been exhibited, has been recently appointed to an important situation under the Surveyor-General of the Colony".

There are no portraits of Henry Hellyer. However, for the sesquicentenary of the town of Burnie in 1977, a portrait was created by local artist Casey McGrath from descriptions, and used as the basis for 200 silver medallions and 4,000 anodised aluminium ones that were given to school children in the area. A special issue of the local newspaper provided a detailed account of his life.

== Work in Tasmania ==
Henry Hellyer explored most of North Western Tasmania for his employer, the Van Diemen's Land Company (VDL Co), and wrote extensive journals and reports which are held in various archives. His best known journey was with Richard Frederick Isaac Cutts, from Circular Head to St Valentines Peak and back, in February 1827.

Overall, it seems clear that Henry Hellyer accepted the VDL Co view that their royal charter from King George IV made the Aboriginal people of North West Tasmania trespassers on company land. In August 1830, while building a footbridge over the River Wey, his camp at Weybridge was visited by George Augustus Robinson and the "friendly mission" whose intent was to investigate claims of killings, including the Cape Grim massacre by VDL Co employees, and to remove all Aboriginal people from their land and relocate them to an offshore island. The party that visited Hellyer's camp included Truganini and her husband Woureddy. Hellyer told Robinson of a stock-keeper who claimed to have killed 19 Aboriginal people with a swivel-gun and later wrote to his sister-in-law about Robinson's visit, saying, "I hope he will do some good, for at present a man's life is not safe if he stirs out without arms, but I have hitherto been lucky enough to escape." This probably refers to an incident on 25 January 1829 which he described in a report as "...a narrow escape, the natives having set fire to a thicket which we were struggling to get through. We rushed through the flames... We saw the natives with fire and tried to shoot them, but although not ten yards off they all escaped..."

In 1831 he became the first European to reach the summit of Cradle Mountain. In the same year, he began the design of the residence, Highfield House, for the Chief Agent of the VDL Co, but he did not live to see it built. He committed suicide on the night of 1/2 September 1832, leaving a note which is held in the Tasmanian Archives.

Hellyer travelled extensively along the north of the island. Parts of his journey have been recorded by Brian J Rollins, who followed precisely parts of this journey. His article, "Henry Hellyer, esquire, 1790/1832: Van Diemen's Land Company surveyor: in his footsteps." was published in 1988 by Australian Surveyor.

== Suicide ==
Hellyer suicided on 9 September 1832, his incoherent suicide note ending with the following line:

Alas my mother, in agony I fly to my saviour.

His suicide was the inspiration for a 1998 play. Most theories about the suicide are speculation, except for a thorough investigation involving the well-validated technique of LIWC (Linguistic Inquiry and Word Count). An analysis of his diaries from the day he left England, suggests he was suffering from ever-increasing depression. An alternative view has been advanced that he may have suffered from bipolar disorder. Baddeley, Daniel and Pennebaker's analysis suggests that his final extreme distress could have been occasioned by gossip circulated about illegal sexual relationships with convict associates. There was no concrete evidence available at the time for this. It is more likely that this gossip was malicious and intended to blacken his name. There could well have been some envy at Stanley (the base for the Van Diemen's Land Company) that Hellyer could look forward to a government appointment. As a devout Christian, he would have been devastated by this. A further suggestion is that he may have suffered from gelotophobia, an inability to deal with what he perceived as bullying, even if this was in fact merely thoughtless teasing.

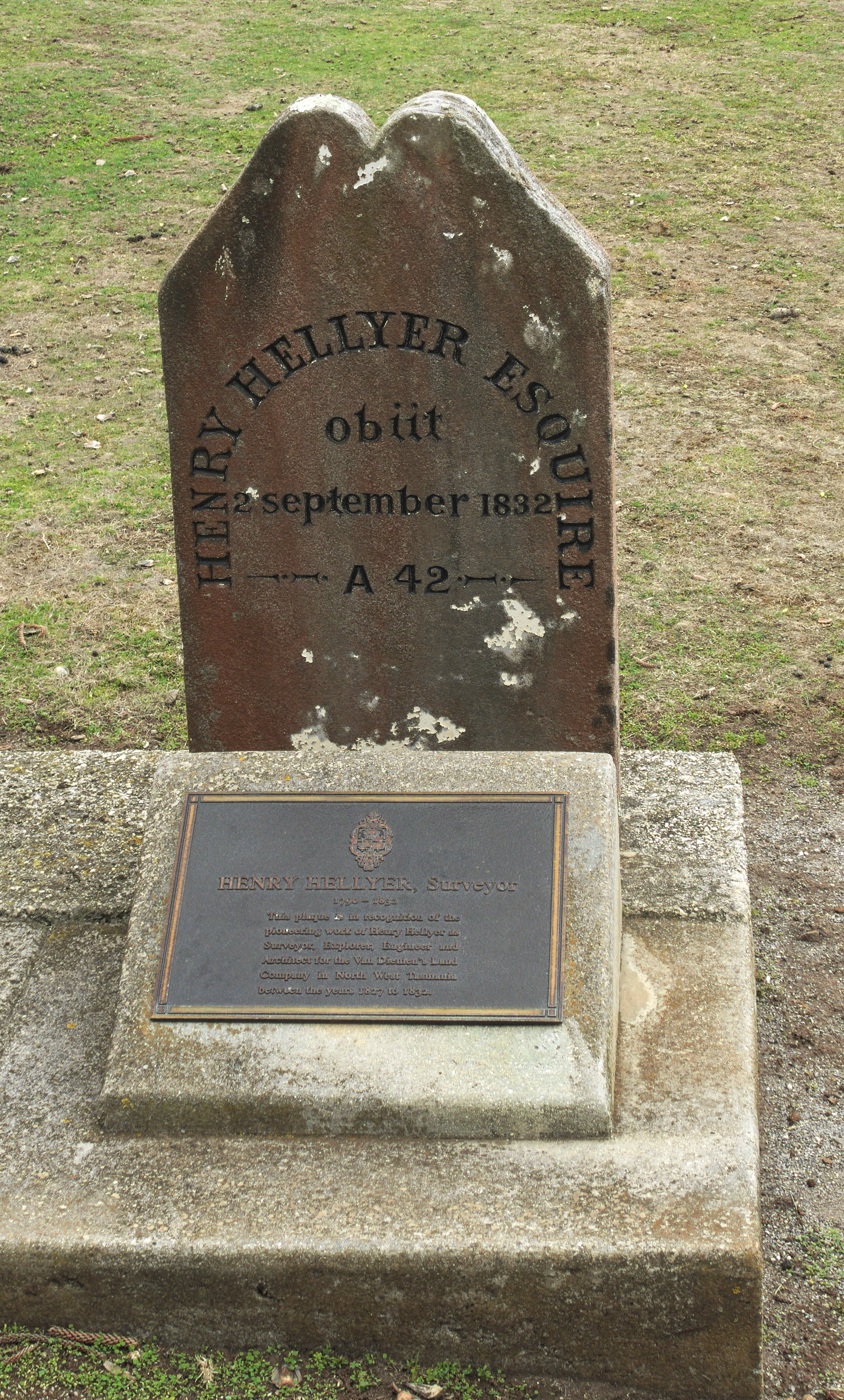
Hellyer's grave in Stanley

A further LIWC analysis of the internal inquiry conducted into his suicide, on behalf of the Van Diemen's Land Company, suggests there was a whitewash by those who might have been seen as involved in negative behaviour towards Hellyer.

Gwyneth Daniel's detailed exposition of these and other points can be seen in Utmost Extrication. Why Henry Hellyer Shot Himself.

Despite the evidence concerning depression, in a letter to his sister-in-law in 1830 he wrote that he had been in excellent health ever since arriving in the Colony, "...except for two or three short attacks occasioned by over-exertion and fatigue after some of my long excursions in the bush". There is no hint of what these "attacks" may have been, but there is no doubt that his explorations were marked by extraordinary energy and copious note-taking on everything that took his interest, from cicadas, through "young centipedes white as snow" to land-crab chimneys. He is often described as a visionary. The Chief agent of the VDL Co wrote of him, "He is exceedingly chimerical in all his ideas... He would have mansions where I would have cottages", and elsewhere, "...he may he said to look upon everything with a painter's eye and upon his own discoveries in particular with an affection which is blind to all faults".

If Henry Hellyer was prone to "attacks" of depression after periods of over-exertion and fatigue, the winter of 1832 provided an occasion. He wrote: "...The snow is so deep that we are completely hemmed in by it. It forms such hard lumps on my overalls... that I was completely fettered by it and in the greatest pain imaginable. One hour of this weather would kill any man if he were stuck fast and remained inactive. The poor dogs were literally plated with coats of mail formed by the ice on their hair, but they traveled better than we could, as the crust would support them...".

== Legacy ==
Although Henry Hellyer had no descendants, his younger brother Thomas Hellyer (1801–41) migrated to New Zealand with his son William (1821–1885) by way of Hobart Town, Tasmania, where Thomas married his second wife on 11 June 1832. Henry Hellyer had by then advised the Court of Directors of the VDL Co that he would be leaving their service at the end of his contract, to accept an appointment with the Surveyor-General in Hobart Town, a highly coveted position that might have generated some envy among his colleagues. It is not known if the brothers had plans to work together, if they met, or if Henry Hellyer attended the wedding. He could have done so, since the VDL Co operated a cutter that made the trip regularly for mail and supplies, but his name is not listed amongst the witnesses.

Henry's nephew William Hellyer migrated from New Zealand to New South Wales about 1838, and became a solicitor and was a member of the NSW Parliament for one day in 1861. Many Australian Hellyers are descended from William, whose son Thomas Henry Hellyer (1840–1889) was a member of the NSW Parliament from 1883 to 84.

=== Places named by or after Henry Hellyer ===
- Arthur River: Aboriginal name Tunganrick, renamed by Hellyer 1827, but it was already recorded as the Arthur River in 1824
- Dipwood Marsh and Dipwood Range: 1827
- Emu River: 13 February 1827
- Hampshire Hills
- Hellyer River and Hellyer Gorge: Aboriginal name Kar.ne.ket.tel.lay; renamed as "Don" by Hellyer, 16 February 1827; later renamed after him
- Saint Valentine's Peak: Aboriginal name Natone, renamed by Hellyer 14/15 February 1827
- Surrey Hills: February 1827

=== Other ===
- Fossil trilobite (Nepea hellyeri)
- Centipe (Lamcytes hellyeri)
- Minerals: Hellyerite, the Hellyer Deposit and the Hellyer Mine
- Hellyer College and the Hellyer Regional Library (later renamed Burnie Library) in Burnie, Tasmania
- Hellyers Road Distillery
