= Governor Davey's Proclamation =

1828 proclamation

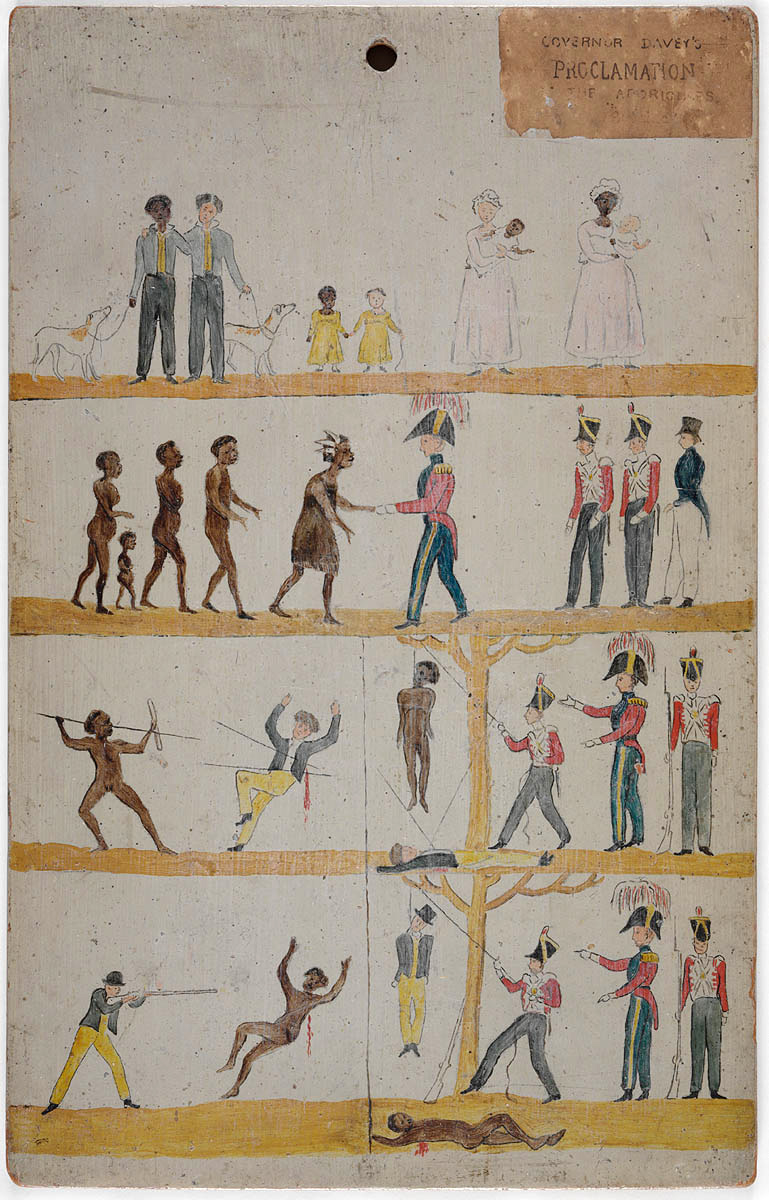
A pictorial proclamation issued by the colonial authorities in Van Diemen's Land espousing equality and peaceful relations between Aboriginal Tasmanians and white settlers

Governor Davey's Proclamation is a misnomer for an illustrated proclamation issued in Van Diemen's Land by the British colonial authorities after 1 November 1828. Although occasionally attributed to Governor Thomas Davey, it was first authorised by Lieutenant Governor George Arthur. Several illustrated narrative versions of the proclamation were created over time. Many of these four-strip pictograms were originally painted onto Huon pine boards using oil paints. Of approximately 100 proclamation boards produced there are seven known to survive in public collections.

The proclamation was intended to explain martial law during the period in Tasmanian history referred to as the Black War.

== Design ==
The pictogram scenes that depict Aboriginal Tasmanians and white settlers were based on drawings by surveyor and artist George Frankland, who suggested in a letter to Lieutenant Governor George Arthur that they should be tied to trees in remote areas of the island. The proclamation boards were designed to communicate to the Aboriginal Tasmanians that anyone in Van Diemen's Land would be treated equally under colonial law. Historian Penelope Edmonds notes that the boards "were made after the 1829 declaration of martial law against Tasmania's Aboriginal people, and the hangings from trees actually depict moments of summary justice and retribution on a violent frontier."

The proclamation boards were reproduced by convict artists. The drawing was mass-produced by pricking the outline of a drawing with a pin, in a technique known as pouncing or spolvero. Charcoal was then dusted through the pinholes and pounded to make an outline.

== Distribution ==
The editor reported in the Hobart newspaper on 5th March 1830 that "We are informed that the Government have given directions for the painting of a large number of pictures to be placed in the bush for the contemplation of the Aboriginal inhabitants."

== Derivative images ==
A ceramic cup made by Tasmanian potter Violet Mace in 1934 is sometimes described as the 'proclamation cup' as it is hand-painted with a series of images that are derivative of those found on the proclamation boards. The cup is held in the collection of the National Museum of Australia.
