= Perry, Maine =

Town in Maine, United States

- Town
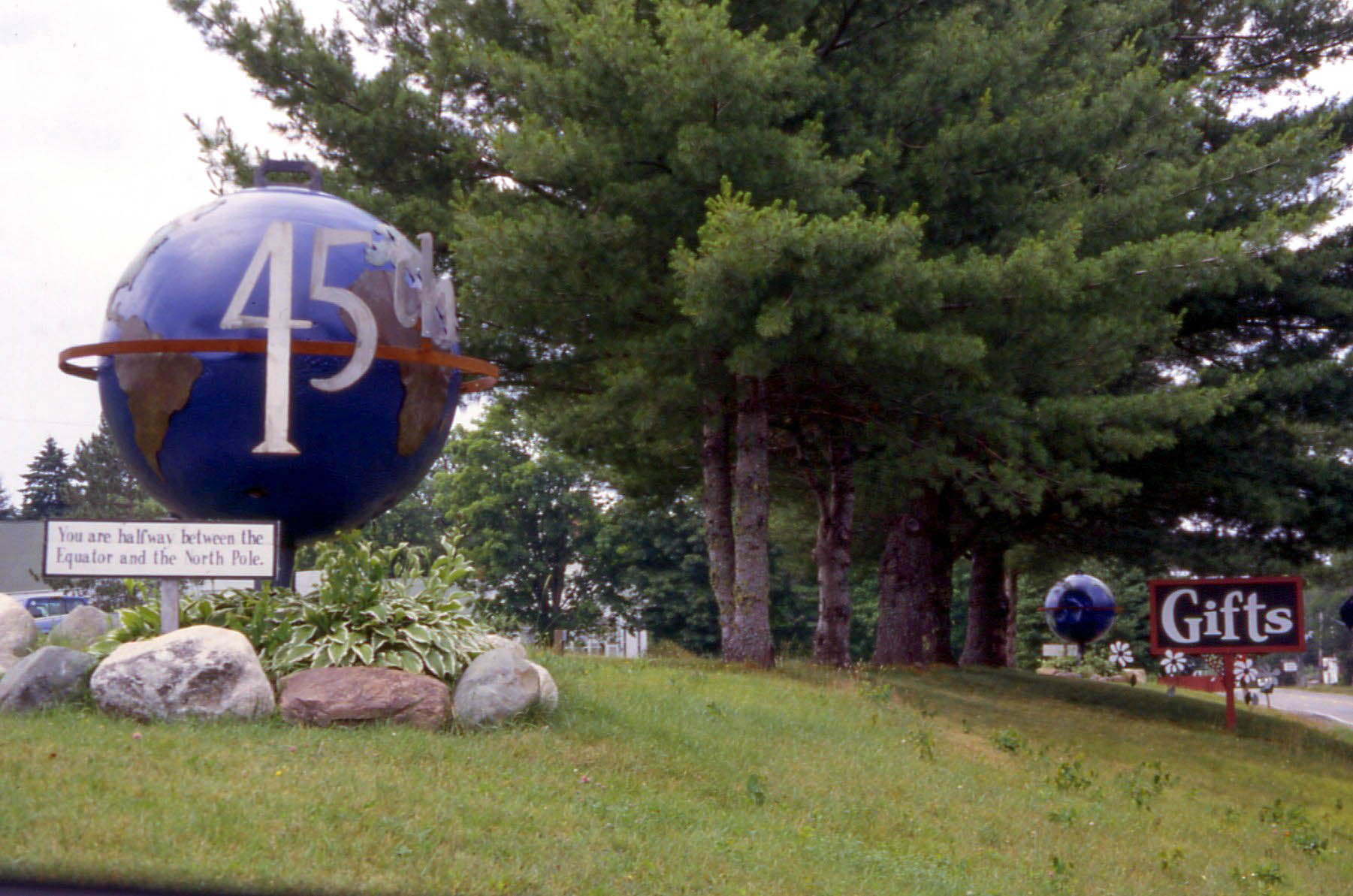
- 45th Parallel, Perry, Maine

- Seal
- Motto: "Halfway Between the Equator and the North Pole"
- Location within Maine Location within the United States
- Coordinates: 45°00′47″N 67°06′37″W
- Country: United States
- State: Maine
- County: Washington

Area
  - Total: 42.06 sq mi (108.93 km^{2})
  - Land: 29.27 sq mi (75.81 km^{2})
  - Water: 12.79 sq mi (33.13 km^{2})
- Elevation: 144 ft (44 m)

Population (2020)
  - Total: 802
  - Density: 27/sq mi (10.6/km^{2})
- Time zone: UTC-5 (Eastern (EST))
  - Summer (DST): UTC-4 (EDT)
- ZIP code: 04667
- Area code: 207
- FIPS code: 23-58165
- GNIS feature ID: 582672
- Website: www.perrymaine.org

Perry is a town in Washington County, Maine, United States, on the Canada–United States border. At the 2020 census, the town had a population of 802.

== History ==
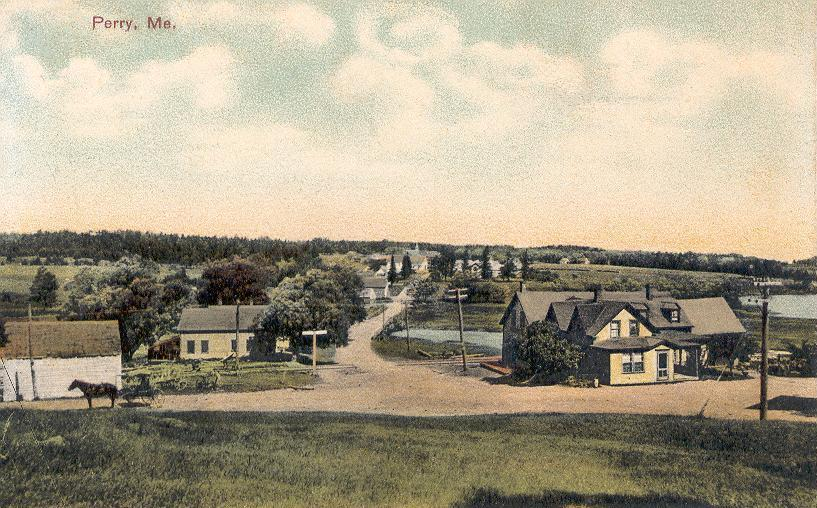
Perry c. 1910

Once part of Plantation T1 TS, the area was settled in 1758 by John Frost, who built a trading post beside the St. Croix River. Situated on Passamaquoddy Bay, the town was incorporated on February 12, 1818, even as the British held Eastport 6 miles (10 km) away. It was named after Commodore Oliver Hazard Perry, hero of the War of 1812. Part of the community lies within the Pleasant Point Passamaquoddy Indian Reservation.

A church in the town was inspiration for the name of the webcomic known as Perry Bible Fellowship.

== Geography ==
According to the United States Census Bureau, the town has a total area of 42.06 square miles (108.93 km^{2}), of which 29.27 square miles (75.81 km^{2}) is land and 12.79 square miles (33.13 km^{2}) is water. Located beside Passamaquoddy Bay, Perry is drained by the St. Croix River.

=== Climate ===
This climatic region is typified by large seasonal temperature differences, with warm to hot (and often humid) summers and cold (sometimes severely cold) winters. According to the Köppen Climate Classification system, Perry has a humid continental climate, abbreviated "Dfb" on climate maps.

== Demographics ==
Historical population
| Census | Pop. | Note | %± |
|---|---|---|---|
| 1820 | 407 | | — |
| 1830 | 735 | | 80.6% |
| 1840 | 1,008 | | 37.1% |
| 1850 | 1,324 | | 31.3% |
| 1860 | 1,195 | | −9.7% |
| 1870 | 1,149 | | −3.8% |
| 1880 | 1,047 | | −8.9% |
| 1890 | 945 | | −9.7% |
| 1900 | 1,245 | | 31.7% |
| 1910 | 1,153 | | −7.4% |
| 1920 | 1,046 | | −9.3% |
| 1930 | 992 | | −5.2% |
| 1940 | 713 | | −28.1% |
| 1950 | 613 | | −14.0% |
| 1960 | 564 | | −8.0% |
| 1970 | 878 | | 55.7% |
| 1980 | 737 | | −16.1% |
| 1990 | 758 | | 2.8% |
| 2000 | 847 | | 11.7% |
| 2010 | 889 | | 5.0% |
| 2020 | 802 | | −9.8% |
U.S. Decennial Census

=== 2010 census ===
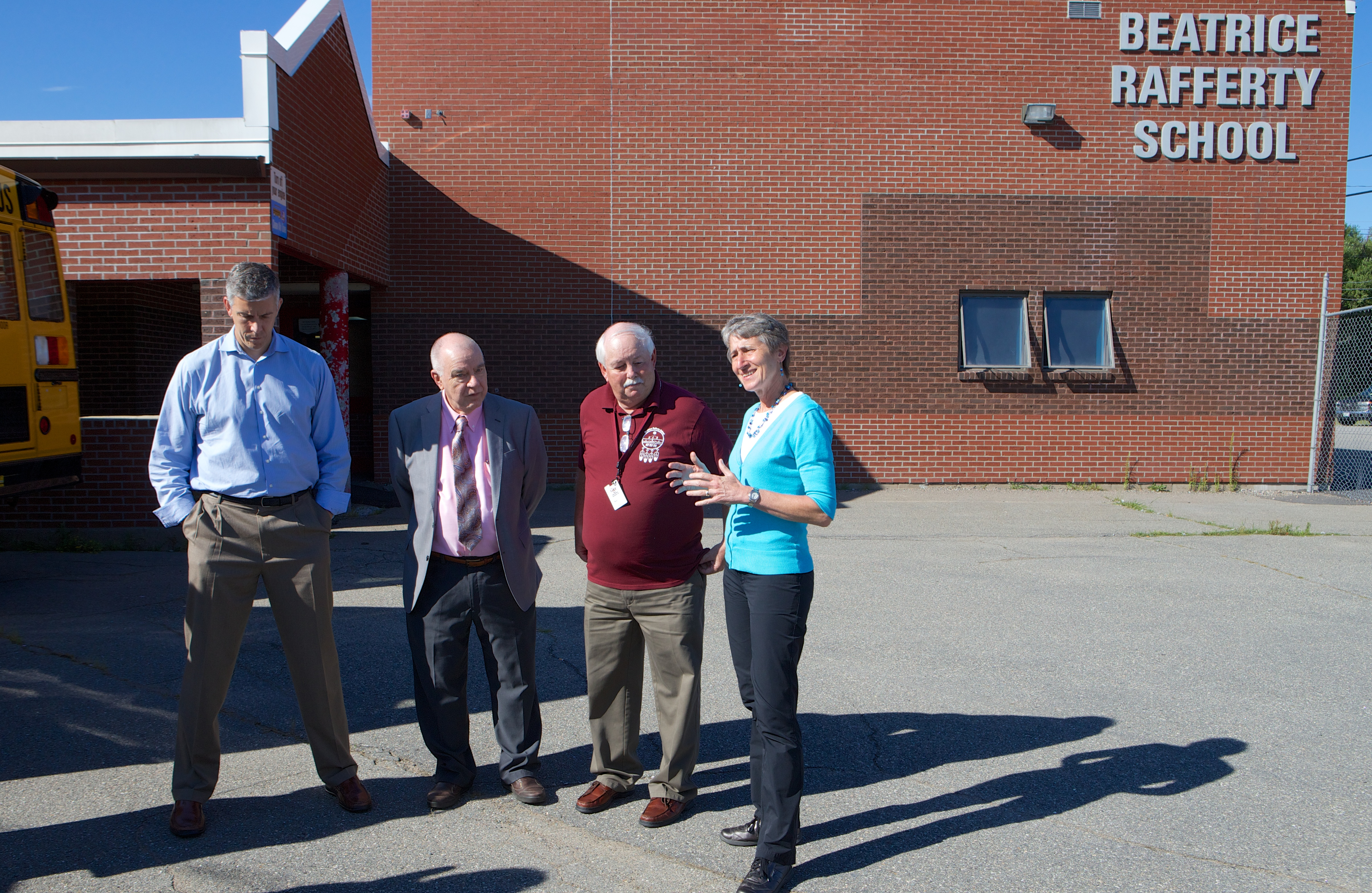
U.S. Secretary of Education Arne Duncan (far left) and U.S. Secretary of the Interior Sally Jewell (far right) visit Beatrice Rafferty School in Perry in 2014

As of the census of 2010, there were 889 people, 362 households, and 253 families living in the town. The population density was 30.4 inhabitants per square mile (11.7/km^{2}). There were 551 housing units at an average density of 18.8 per square mile (7.3/km^{2}). The racial makeup of the town was 85.5% White, 10.5% Native American, 0.1% Asian, 0.3% Pacific Islander, 0.3% from other races, and 3.3% from two or more races. Hispanic or Latino of any race were 1.0% of the population.

There were 362 households, of which 30.1% had children under the age of 18 living with them, 57.2% were married couples living together, 6.4% had a female householder with no husband present, 6.4% had a male householder with no wife present, and 30.1% were non-families. 22.7% of all households were made up of individuals, and 6.4% had someone living alone who was 65 years of age or older. The average household size was 2.46 and the average family size was 2.89.

The median age in the town was 44 years. 23.8% of residents were under the age of 18; 3.6% were between the ages of 18 and 24; 24.5% were from 25 to 44; 34.2% were from 45 to 64; and 13.9% were 65 years of age or older. The gender makeup of the town was 48.0% male and 52.0% female.

=== 2000 census ===
As of the census of 2000, there were 847 people, 331 households, and 238 families living in the town. The population density was 28.8 inhabitants per square mile (11.1/km^{2}). There were 529 housing units at an average density of 18.0 per square mile (6.9/km^{2}). The racial makeup of the town was 86.19% White, 0.24% African American, 11.92% Native American, 0.12% Pacific Islander, and 1.53% from two or more races.

There were 331 households, out of which 34.1% had children under the age of 18 living with them, 55.3% were married couples living together, 10.0% had a female householder with no husband present, and 27.8% were non-families. 21.5% of all households were made up of individuals, and 8.8% had someone living alone who was 65 years of age or older. The average household size was 2.54 and the average family size was 2.92.

In the town, the population was spread out, with 27.5% under the age of 18, 7.4% from 18 to 24, 27.2% from 25 to 44, 26.7% from 45 to 64, and 11.2% who were 65 years of age or older. The median age was 37 years. For every 100 females, there were 92.9 males. For every 100 females age 18 and over, there were 99.4 males.

The median income for a household in the town was $27,788, and the median income for a family was $35,104. Males had a median income of $31,442 versus $22,292 for females. The per capita income for the town was $14,285. About 15.9% of families and 17.5% of the population were below the poverty line, including 17.2% of those under age 18 and 32.5% of those age 65 or over.

== Notable people ==
- Emma Nutt, world's first female Telephone Operator
- Kevin Raye, president of the Maine State Senate
