= Hellyer Gorge =

River gorge in Tasmania

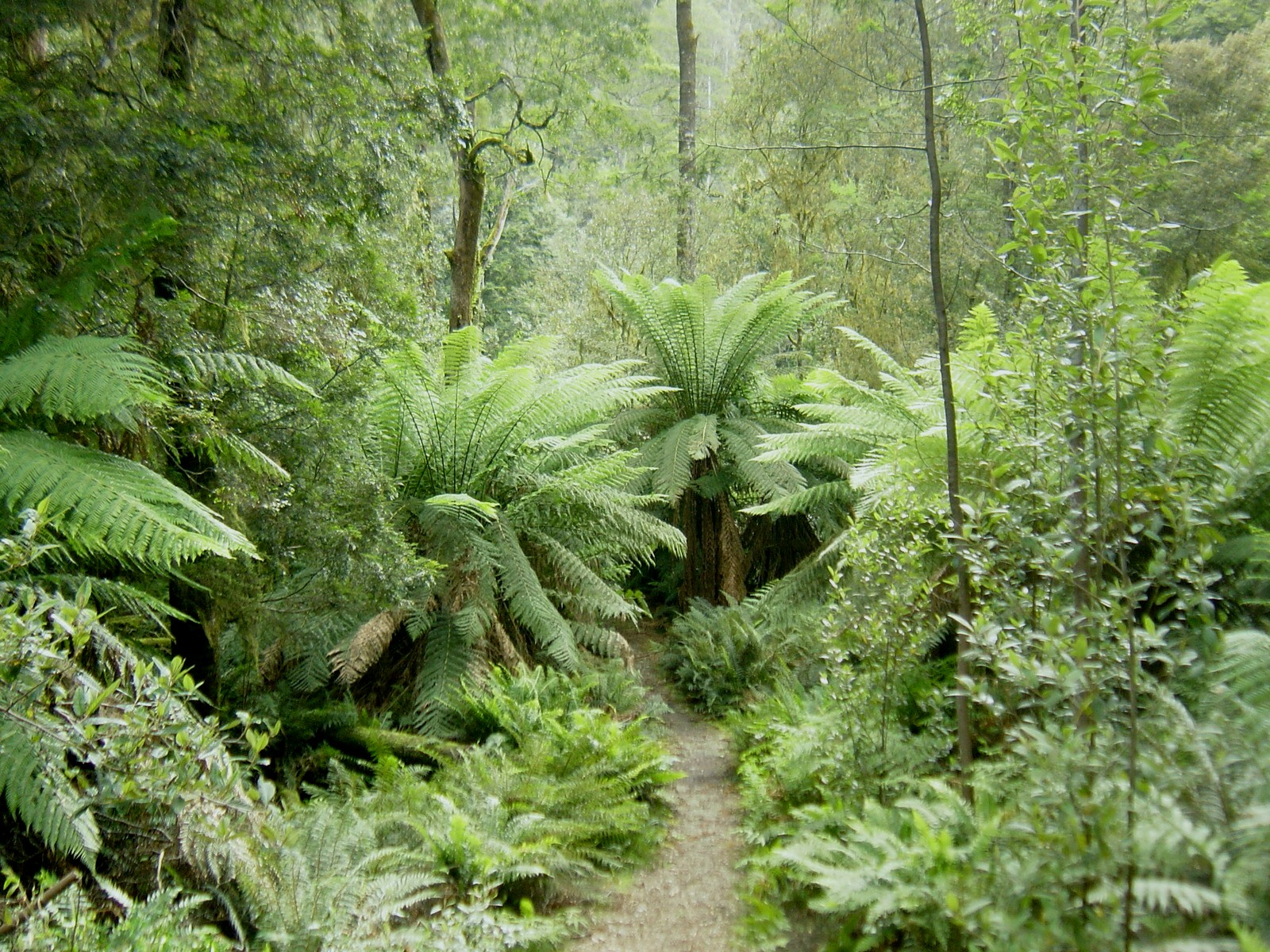
Rainforest in Tasmania's Hellyer Gorge is considered a Gondwanan relic.

The Hellyer Gorge is a gorge in Tasmania, located between Stanley and Cradle Mountain. The Hellyer River flows through the gorge, which is named after Henry Hellyer.

Throughout the Hellyer Gorge is a rainforest with sassafras, giant myrtle, and large ferns. The gorge is the site of the Hellyer Gorge State Reserve.

The Murchison Highway passes through the gorge area with many sharp and steep bends. This highway provides the setting to a stage of Targa Tasmania. Being subject to black ice, this portion of road has now been bypassed by the newer Ridgley Highway. Some bush-walking tracks have been blazed for tourists.
