= John Nutt (disambiguation) =

John Nutt was a 17th-century English pirate.

John Nutt may also refer to:

- John Nutt (politician) (1605–1668), English Member of Parliament
- John Nutt (printer) (died 1716), English printer and bookseller

== See also ==
- Nutt, a surname, including a list of people with the name
