= Hellyers Road Distillery =

Whisky distillery in Tasmania, Australia

Coordinates: 41°05′20.3″S 145°54′34.9″E

Hellyers Road
- Location: Burnie, Tasmania
- Owner: Hellyers Road Distillery
- Founded: 1997; 29 years ago
- Status: Operational
- No. of stills: 1

Hellyers Road
- Type: Single malt
- ABV: 46%–70.2% (Cask Strength)

Hellyers Road is a whisky distillery in Burnie, Tasmania. Founded in 1997 by Betta Milk, a group of dairy farmers, it takes its name from a road surveyed in 1827 by explorer Henry Hellyer. In 2010, Hellyers Road was recognised by the Malt Whisky Association of Australia for producing the nation's best single malt, and in 2013 Hellyers Road Pinot Noir Finish was voted ‘Best New World Whisky’ from a series of blind tastings conducted at the Whisky Live fair in Paris.
