= Hellyer River =

River in Tasmania, Australia

Hellyer
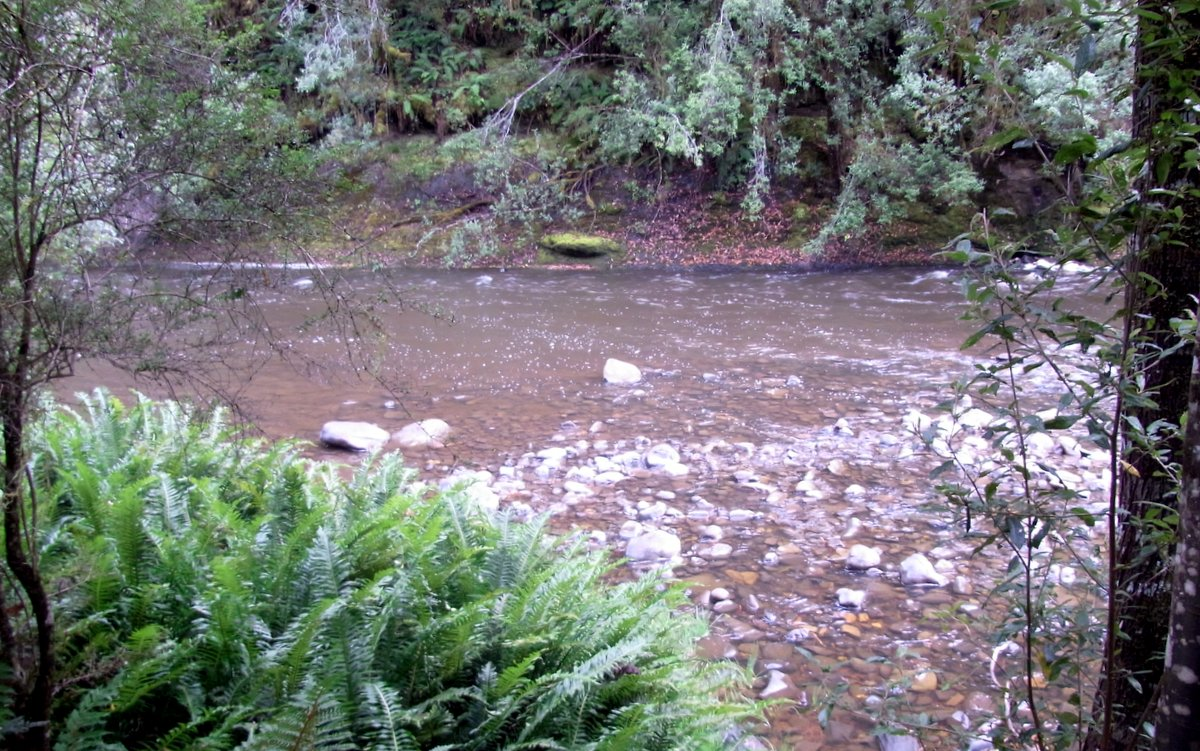
- Hellyer River, at Hellyer Gorge

- Location of the Hellyer River mouth in Tasmania
- Etymology: Henry Hellyer, an explorer

Location
- Country: Australia
- State: Tasmania
- Region: North-western Tasmania

Physical characteristics
- Mouth: Arthur River
  - coordinates: 41°16′21″S 145°36′52″E
- Length: 61 km (38 mi)

Basin features
- River system: Arthur River catchment
- Tributaries
  - left: Fossey River
  - right: Wey River

The Hellyer River is a perennial river in north western Tasmania, Australia.

The river flows for 61 kilometres (38 mi) before joining into the Arthur River. High quality cool temperate rainforest and tall eucalyptus forest grows along much of the river. Significant species include myrtle beech, leatherwood, southern sassafras and messmate. The river in named in honour of the explorer Henry Hellyer.

== See also ==
- Rivers of Tasmania
