= Nuts! (book) =

1996 book about Southwest Airlines

Nuts!: Southwest Airlines' Crazy Recipe for Business and Personal Success
- Authors: Kevin Freiberg; Jacquelyn Freiberg
- Subject: Southwest Airlines
- Published: Bard Press (1996)
- Media type: Non-fiction book
- ISBN: 9780767901840

Nuts!: Southwest Airlines' Crazy Recipe for Business and Personal Success is a 1996 non-fiction book about the American low-cost airline Southwest Airlines by Kevin and Jacquelyn Freiberg, published by Bard Press.

== Background ==
The Freibergs, a husband and wife couple, were working on a PhD about leadership when they first became involved with Southwest. They operate a consulting company together in San Diego.

== Contents ==
The book lists positive aspects of the company operations and culture at Southwest. Publishers Weekly wrote that "The Freibergs state up front that their work is not an exposé and make no apologies for presenting a very positive and optimistic view."

The chapters are "A Legend Takes Off," "Basics Gone Nuts", "Doing the Extra Special Exceptionally Well", and "The Legend Lives On." The first describes the company's beginning. The second describes Southwest's management philosophy, known as "NUTS". The third describes the Corporate Culture and putting the interests of employees ahead of those of customers, and the fourth is about the management style from the executives. Each chapter has a "Success in a Nutshell" section summarizing what Bellinda Wise of Nassau Community College describes as "the eccentric elements of Southwest's corporate culture." Wise adds that the Freibergs "emphasize" the "caring character of the company" "to the point of sounding corny."

== Reception ==
James Routhnie of EasyGroup, owner of British budget airline EasyJet, stated that the company founder Stelios Haji-Ioannou had referred to the book as his "bible" and personally gave him a copy. Routhnie wrote that the book helped him learn about job satisfaction.

John Nirenberg of the University of Phoenix wrote that the book "is the story not of one person or a small group of insiders" but instead "the story of what is possible when people are engaged in their work and their organization." He described the book " as a fascinating account" as the opposite of Mean Business: How I Save Bad Companies and Make Good Companies Great by Albert J. Dunlap. Nirenberg stated that the book "equally leaves the reader with a skeptical view of the cozy claims" of the company's benevolence; and that it "hardly created a ripple upon its release."

Publishers Weekly stated that "some critical analysis would have made for a more worthwhile presentation" although the rise of Southwest is "worthy of study".

Lamar Muse, first president and CEO of Southwest (1971-1978), said in his own book that any similarity between the "real story" and the "convoluted tales" told in Nuts! was "purely coincidental".
