= George Frankland =

Australian surveyor

- Born: 1800
- Died: 30 December 1838
- Scientific career
- Fields: Geography

George Frankland (1800 – 30 December 1838) was an English surveyor and Surveyor-General of Van Diemen's Land (now Tasmania).

In 1823, Frankland was appointed surveyor-general at Poona, India, where he became acquainted with Edward Dumaresq. In 1827 Frankland arrived in Van Diemen's Land as first assistant surveyor, in March 1828 he became Surveyor General of Tasmania. Frankland soon began a trigonometric survey of the island, but suffered some criticism due to his slow progress. John Helder Wedge and James Erskine Calder criticized Frankland's ability as a surveyor.

Frankland travelled on several expeditions and recorded his observations, considering it his duty "to observe and record every remarkable fact connected with the Natural history of the island whose surface and native production have, in a manner, been placed so peculiarly in his custody." Frankland made sketches of some of the country he explored and did the artwork for the proclamation to encourage peaceful relations between colonists and the local indigenous people, authorised by Lieutenant Governor George Arthur in 1828. Frankland mapped the Derwent, Gordon, Huon and Nive river systems.

The Frankland Range in Tasmania, the Frankland River, Frankland, Western Australia and Mount Frankland in Western Australia are named after him.
