= Nut grass =

Nut grass or nutgrass may refer to:

- Cyperus eragrostis, tall nutgrass
- Cyperus esculentus, yellow nutsedge, yellow nutgrass
- Cyperus rotundus, coco-grass, Java grass
