= Brian Inder =

Australian tourism pioneer (1930–2019)

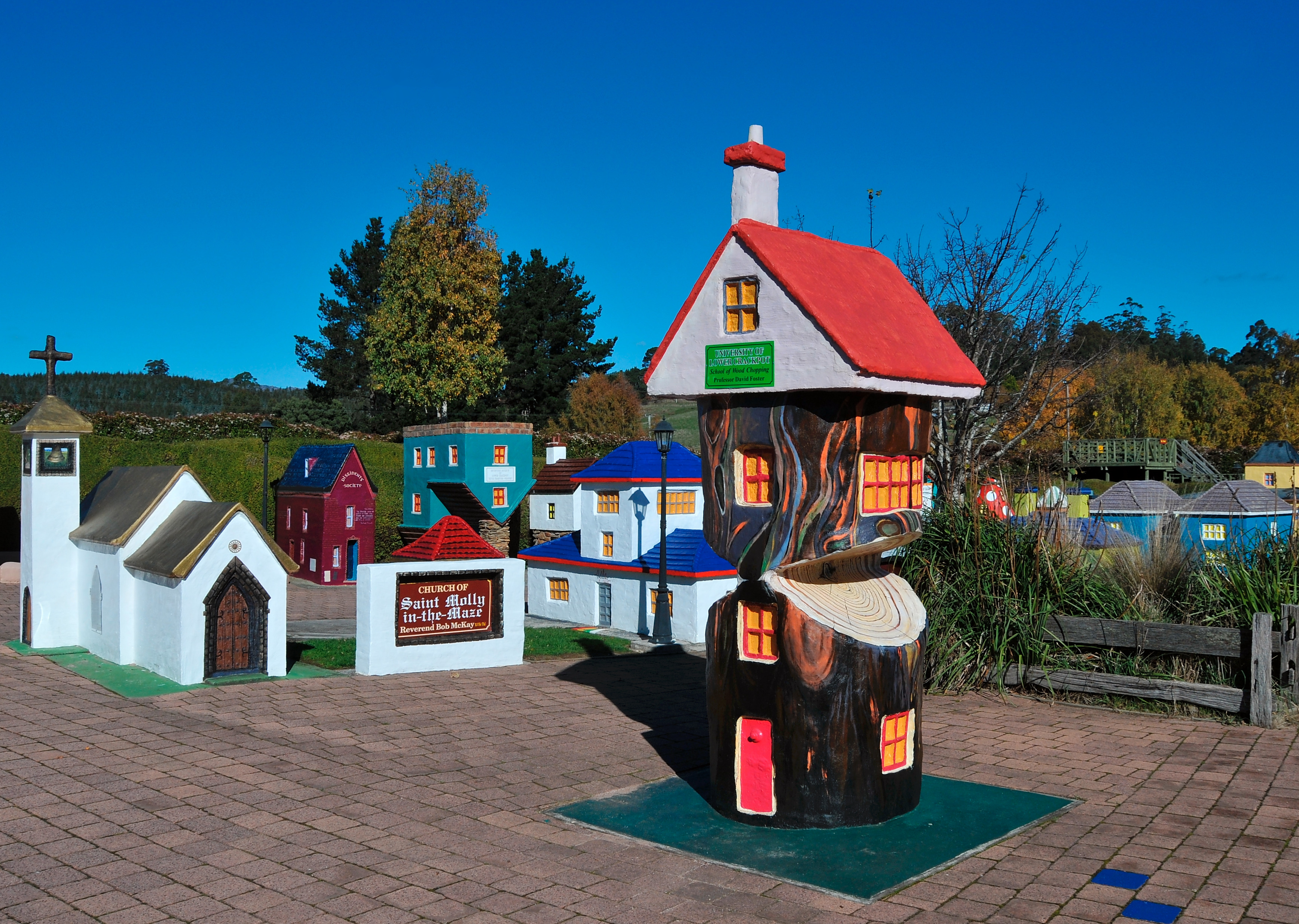
Brian Inder's Village of Lower Crackpot in the tourist attraction Tasmazia

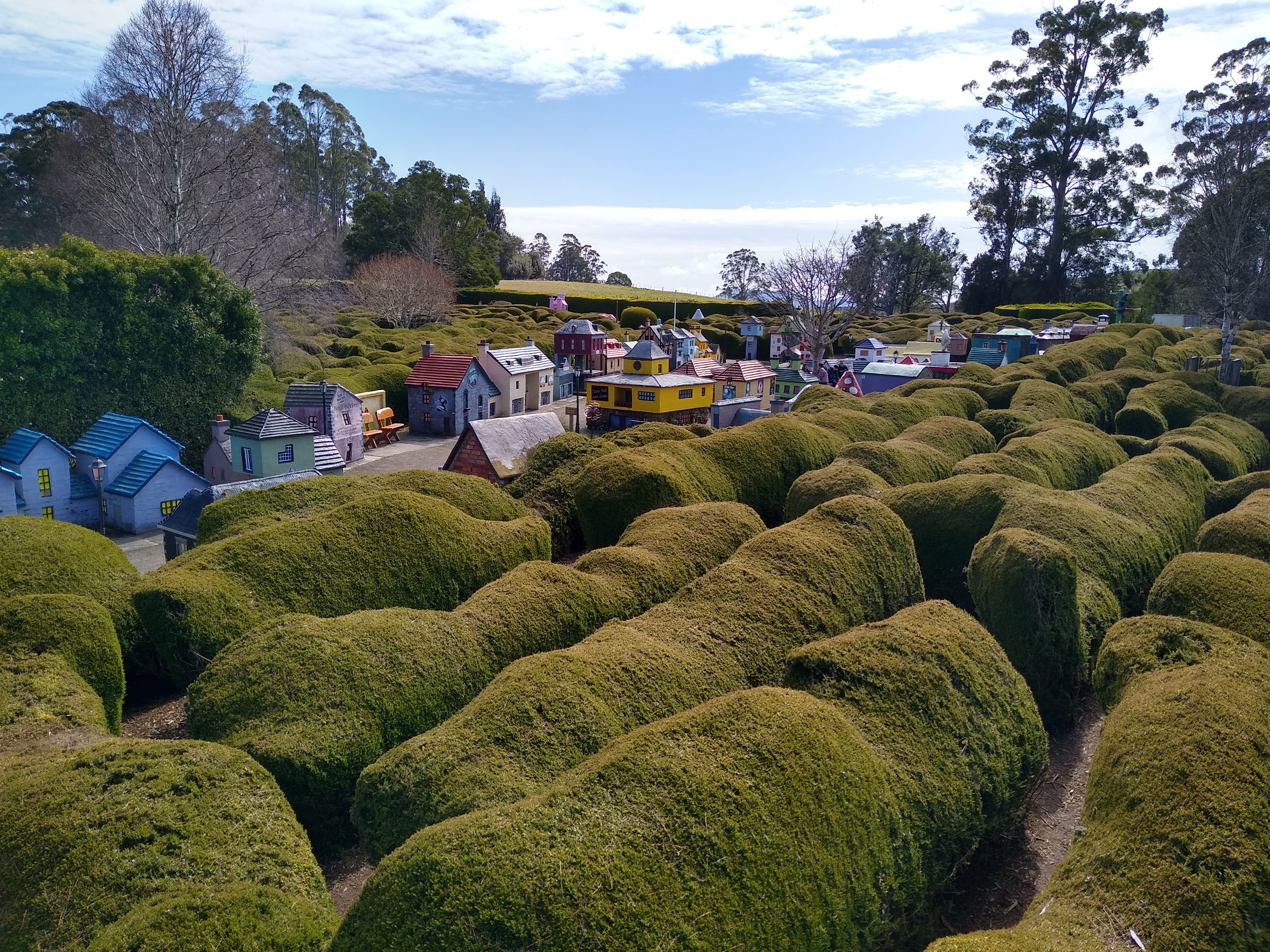
A hedge maze at Tasmazia, with Lower Crackpot in the background

Brian Inder (12 December 1930 - 21 August 2019) is a tourism pioneer of North Western Tasmania, Australia. On his property at Promised Land near Lake Barrington he has established the world's largest maze complexes, called Tasmazia.

When dairy farming was proving difficult in the early 1980s, Inder moved to Lavender farming and manufacture of herbal products which proved more profitable. A childhood dream of establishing a hedge maze proved initially difficult, so he developed a model town called the Village of Lower Crackpot. A gift shop, pancake parlour, and honey tasting soon followed making Tasmazia the largest commercial tourism attraction on the North West Coast.

When the nearby town of Sheffield was facing commercial decline, Inder was instrumental in establishing Sheffield as a town of murals with a mural fest. Other festivals he played a leading role in establishing include the Blooming Tasmania festival and the Lavender festival.

Inder has served as a board member of the West North-West Regional Tourism Association and vice-president of the Kentish Association of Tourism.

On the coast near the mouth of the Arthur River is a plaque titled The Edge of the World, a term coined by Inder, with a poem by him referring to the timeless and wild nature of the coastline at Arthur River which is regularly lashed by the gales of the Roaring Forties.

In November 2005 he was honoured with the Outstanding Contribution by an Individual Award by the Tourism Council of Tasmania. On winning the award he was reported by The Mercury as saying

"When I started out in tourism it wasn't highly regarded as an industry because it wasn't an industry you could see in the way you see a factory with smoke blowing out at all hours.

"Now it is the biggest industry in the state and is providing jobs for our kids.

"I'd like people to realise it is an export industry -- we export experiences which people take home with them without us having to worry about shipping -- and that makes it a bloody good industry for everyone."
