= Emma Nutt =

World's first female telephone operator (1860-1915)

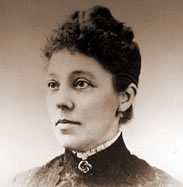
- Born: July 1860; Perry, Maine
- Died: 1915 (aged 54–55)
- Occupation: Telephone operator
- Known for: World's first female telephone operator

Notes
- In 1900, Emma, her parents, her sister Stella, and Stella's husband, William G Evart, and 10-year-old son, Arthur C Evart, were living together in Chelsea, Massachusetts

Emma Nutt (July 1860 – 1915) became the world's first female telephone operator on September 1, 1878, when she started working for the Edwin Holmes Telephone Despatch [sic] Company (or the Boston Telephone Dispatch Company) in Boston, Massachusetts, U.S.

== Life and career ==
In January 1878, the Boston Telephone Dispatch Company had started hiring boys as telephone operators, starting with George Willard Croy. Boys (reportedly including Nutt's husband) had been very successful as telegraphy operators, but their attitude (lack of patience) and behavior (pranks and cursing) were unacceptable for live phone contact. The company began hiring women operators instead, starting with Nutt on September 1, 1878. Her career lasted between 33 and 37 years, ending with her retirement sometime between 1911 and 1915. A few hours after Nutt started working, her sister Stella became the world's second female telephone operator, also making the pair the first two sister telephone operators in history. Unlike her sister, Stella only remained on the job for a few years.

The customer response to Nutt's soothing, cultured voice and patience was overwhelmingly positive, and male telegraphy operators were soon replaced by women. In 1879 these included Bessie Snow Balance, Emma Landon, Carrie Boldt, and Minnie Schumann, the first female operators in Michigan.

Nutt was hired by Alexander Graham Bell, who is credited with inventing the first practical telephone; apparently she changed jobs from a local telegraph office. She was paid a salary of $10 per month for a 54-hour week (about $1.50 / hour in 2024 dollars). Reportedly, she could remember every number in the telephone directory of the New England Telephone Company.

== Commemoration ==
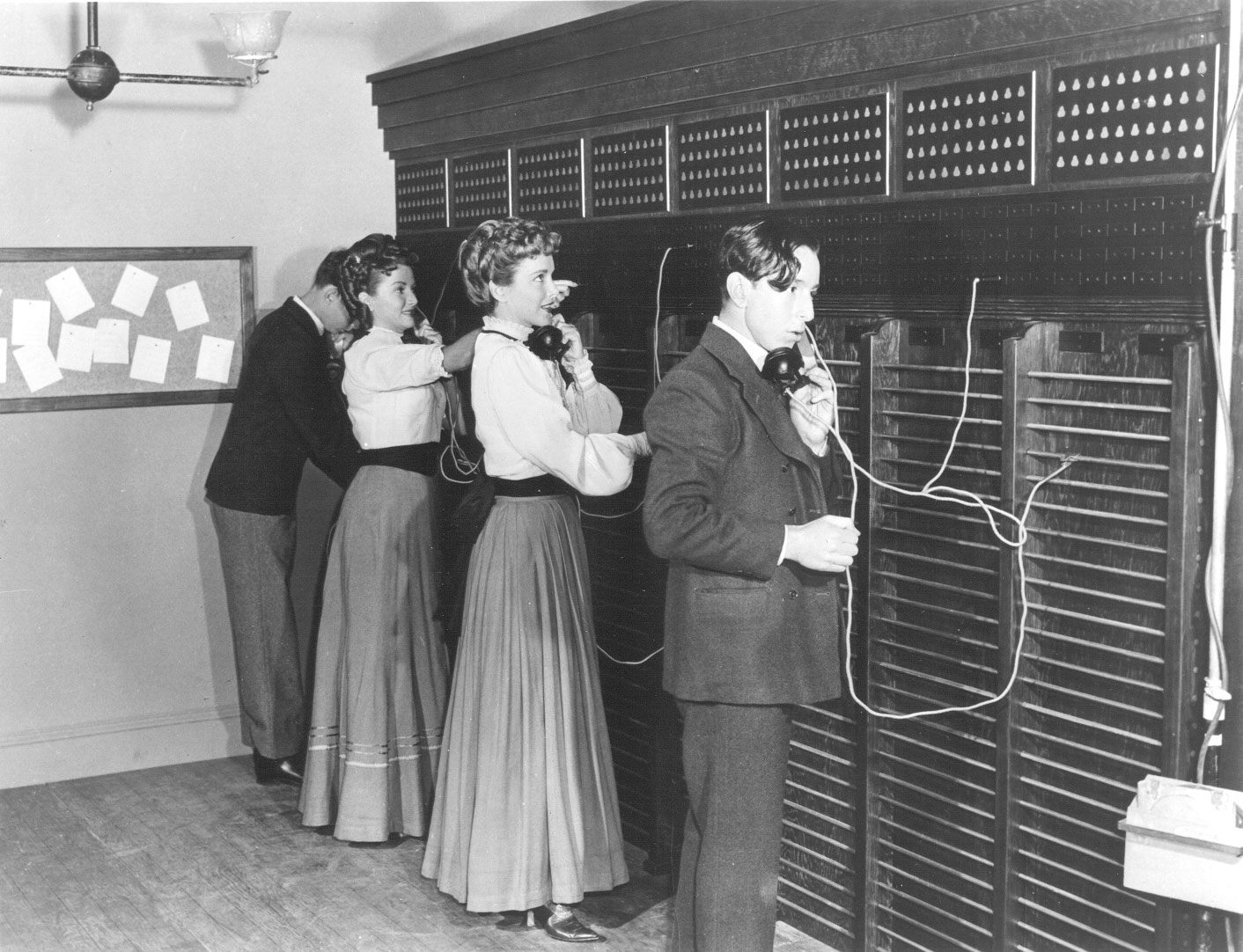
This scene from "Bold Experiment – the Telephone Story", depicts the first women operators, Emma and Stella Nutt, working alongside boy operators at the Edwin Holmes Telephone Despatch Co. Boston, Massachusetts in 1878.

"EMMA", a synthesized speech attendant system created by Preferred Voice and Philips Electronics is named in her honor.

1 September is unofficially commemorated as Emma M. Nutt Day.

== See also ==
- Telephone switchboard
- Directory assistance
- International operator services
- Long-distance operator
