= Stanley, Tasmania =

Stanley Munatreoon
- Town
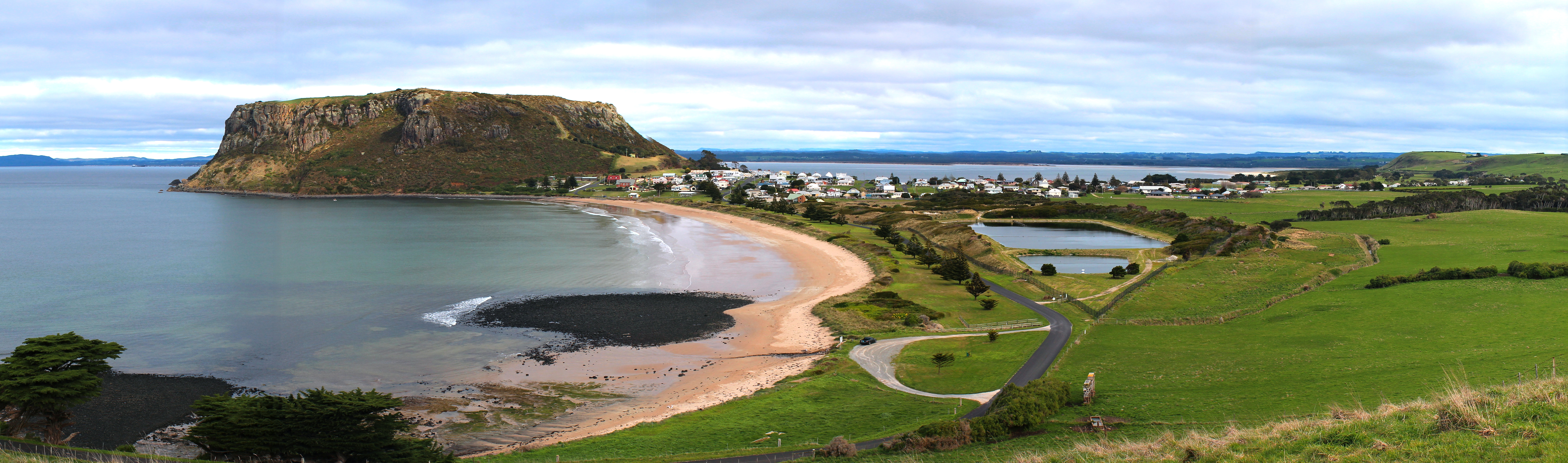
- Stanley and The Nut viewed from Highfield

- Coordinates: 40°45′40″S 145°17′40″E
- Country: Australia
- State: Tasmania
- LGA: Circular Head Council
- Location: 379 km (235 mi) NW of Hobart; 224 km (139 mi) W of Launceston; 127 km (79 mi) W of Devonport; 21 km (13 mi) NE of Smithton

Government
  - State electorate: Braddon
  - Federal division: Braddon
- Elevation: 10 m (33 ft)

Population
  - Total: 595 (2021 census)
- Postcode: 7331
- Mean max temp: 16.1 °C (61.0 °F)
- Mean min temp: 9.4 °C (48.9 °F)
- Annual rainfall: 934.7 mm (36.80 in)

Stanley is a town on the north-west coast of Tasmania, Australia. It is the second-last major township on the north-west coast when one travels west from Devonport, the larger township in the Circular Head municipality being Smithton. According to the 2021 census, Stanley had a population of 595.

== History ==
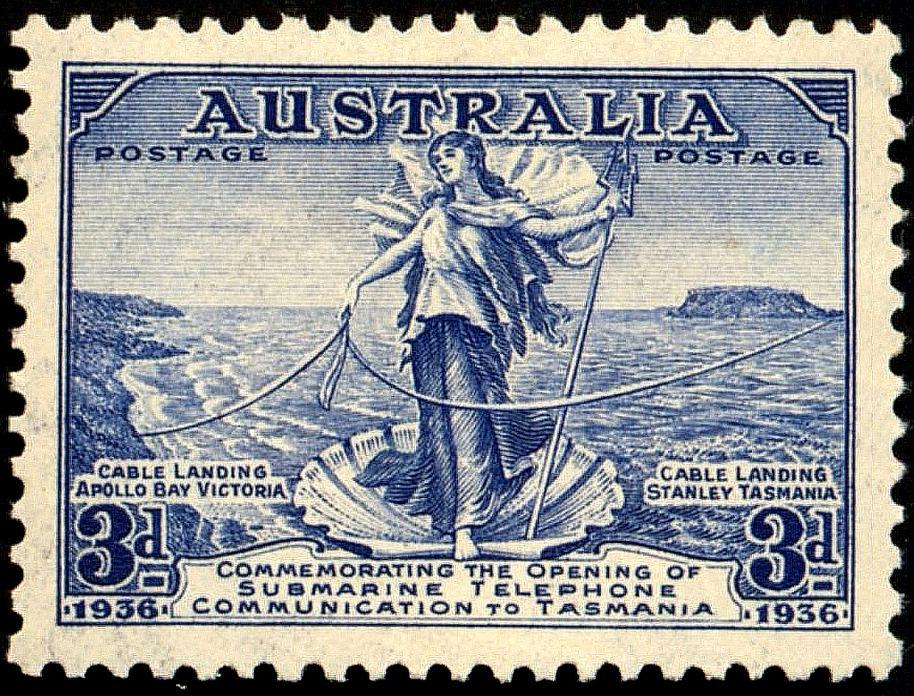
1936 Stamp: Cable to Tasmania depicting Amphitrite

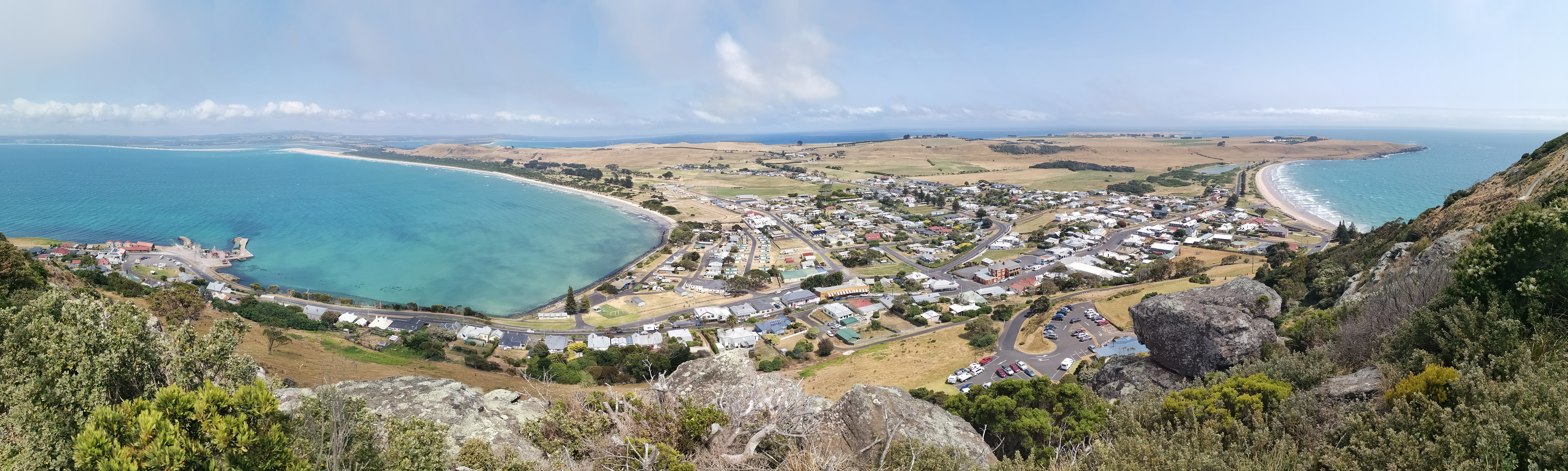
Stanley as seen from the top of The Nut

Western Tasmanian languages were spoken by Tasmanian Aborigines in the area but became extinct during the 19th century.

In 1825, the Van Diemen's Land Company was granted land in north-western Van Diemen's Land, including the Stanley area. Employees of the company from England settled in the area in October 1826. The site (originally called Circular Head) was named after Lord Stanley, the British Secretary of State for War and the Colonies in the 1830s and 1840s, who later had three terms of office as British Prime Minister.

A port opened in 1827 and the first school opened in 1841. There was a short-lived bay whaling station in operation on the foreshore in the 1830s. Stanley officially became a town in 1842 and by 1843 more than 8,000 acres had been sold or leased to almost 70 people.

The Post Office opened on 1 July 1845 and was known as Circular Head post office until 1882. In 1880 the first coach service between Stanley and Burnie was established.

In 1936 a submarine telephone cable from Apollo Bay to Stanley provided the first telephone to Tasmania from the mainland.

== The town today ==
Today Stanley is a tourist destination and the main fishing port on the northwest coast of Tasmania.

The most distinctive landmark in Stanley is Munatrik, commonly called The Nut, an extinct volcano. Bass and Flinders sighted it on their circumnavigation of Van Diemen's Land (now called Tasmania) in 1798 and named it Circular Head. It has steep sides and rises to 143 metres with a flat top. It is possible to walk to the top of The Nut via a steep track or a chairlift.

Tourists regularly travel to Highfield (the original home of the Van Diemen's Land company in Circular head, northwest of the township) to view the picturesque northern beaches with The Nut in the background. The port on the southern side of The Nut is a regularly used fishing spot.

== Notable people associated with Stanley ==
- John Lee Archer – the "Father of Tasmanian architecture". Archer became a magistrate in the Circular Head area in 1838 until his death in 1852.
- Henry Hellyer – Chief Surveyor, explorer, and architect
- Enid Lyons – first woman elected to the Australian Parliament; first woman to serve in the Cabinet of Australia
- Joseph Lyons – the tenth Prime Minister of Australia; married to Enid Lyons.
- Bill Mollison – founder of the permaculture movement
- Jim Willis – Australian botanist
- Vanessa Bleyer – Senator for Tasmania

== Climate ==
Stanley has an oceanic climate (Köppen climate classification: Cfb) that is bordering closely with the warm-summer mediterranean climate (Köppen climate classification: Csb). Rainfall in the summer months receives more than the classification as the warm-summer Mediterranean, and the total rainfall exceeds 900 mm. Stanley's summers are moderated by its shoreline position, whereas the rainy winters have moderate lows. The highest temperature of 32.8 °C (91.0 °F) was recorded on 14 March 1967, and the lowest temperature of −2.1 °C (28.2 °F) was recorded on 7 August 1963.

Climate data for Stanley Post Office (10 m AMSL; BOM 1868-1999)
| Month | Jan | Feb | Mar | Apr | May | Jun | Jul | Aug | Sep | Oct | Nov | Dec | Year |
|---|---|---|---|---|---|---|---|---|---|---|---|---|---|
| Record high °C (°F) | 30.1 (86.2) | 29.9 (85.8) | 32.8 (91.0) | 25.0 (77.0) | 20.5 (68.9) | 18.7 (65.7) | 18.9 (66.0) | 16.6 (61.9) | 19.3 (66.7) | 21.1 (70.0) | 26.1 (79.0) | 28.5 (83.3) | 32.8 (91.0) |
| Mean daily maximum °C (°F) | 21.2 (70.2) | 21.5 (70.7) | 20.0 (68.0) | 17.4 (63.3) | 15.1 (59.2) | 13.3 (55.9) | 12.6 (54.7) | 13.2 (55.8) | 14.2 (57.6) | 16.0 (60.8) | 17.7 (63.9) | 19.4 (66.9) | 16.8 (62.2) |
| Daily mean °C (°F) | 16.7 (62.1) | 17.2 (63.0) | 15.9 (60.6) | 13.8 (56.8) | 11.9 (53.4) | 10.3 (50.5) | 9.6 (49.3) | 9.9 (49.8) | 10.8 (51.4) | 12.2 (54.0) | 13.7 (56.7) | 15.2 (59.4) | 13.1 (55.6) |
| Mean daily minimum °C (°F) | 12.2 (54.0) | 12.9 (55.2) | 11.8 (53.2) | 10.1 (50.2) | 8.7 (47.7) | 7.2 (45.0) | 6.5 (43.7) | 6.6 (43.9) | 7.4 (45.3) | 8.3 (46.9) | 9.6 (49.3) | 11.0 (51.8) | 9.4 (48.9) |
| Record low °C (°F) | 4.1 (39.4) | 5.0 (41.0) | 2.7 (36.9) | 0.7 (33.3) | 0.4 (32.7) | −1.8 (28.8) | −0.8 (30.6) | −2.1 (28.2) | −1.1 (30.0) | −0.7 (30.7) | 2.7 (36.9) | 3.2 (37.8) | −2.1 (28.2) |
| Average rainfall mm (inches) | 42.5 (1.67) | 46.9 (1.85) | 50.1 (1.97) | 76.1 (3.00) | 92.1 (3.63) | 104.4 (4.11) | 117.1 (4.61) | 103.9 (4.09) | 85.9 (3.38) | 86.2 (3.39) | 65.4 (2.57) | 62.0 (2.44) | 935.9 (36.85) |
| Average precipitation days (≥ 0.2 mm) | 10.1 | 9.6 | 12.5 | 15.4 | 18.8 | 18.9 | 21.7 | 20.9 | 18.2 | 16.7 | 14.6 | 12.7 | 190.1 |
| Average rainy days (≥ 1 mm) | 4.8 | 4.6 | 5.5 | 7.1 | 9.1 | 9.7 | 11.3 | 11.2 | 9.4 | 8.5 | 7.2 | 6.2 | 94.6 |
| Average afternoon relative humidity (%) | 64 | 66 | 69 | 73 | 76 | 78 | 78 | 76 | 74 | 71 | 69 | 67 | 72 |
| Average dew point °C (°F) | 12.7 (54.9) | 12.7 (54.9) | 11.8 (53.2) | 10.8 (51.4) | 9.6 (49.3) | 8.6 (47.5) | 7.5 (45.5) | 7.5 (45.5) | 8.1 (46.6) | 8.7 (47.7) | 9.8 (49.6) | 11.6 (52.9) | 10.0 (49.9) |
Source: Bureau of Meteorology
