= William Hellyer =

Politician and solicitor in New South Wales, Australia (1821–1885)

William Hellyer (1821 – 8 January 1885) was an Australian solicitor and a member of the New South Wales Legislative Council for one day.

== Early life ==
Hellher was born in 1821. His father was Thomas Hellyer (1801–41) and his uncle was Henry Hellyer, surveyor, architect and explorer in Tasmania. On 20 January 1840, William married Margaret Gray at Bathurst.

== Professional career ==
In 1854, Hellyer applied to be admitted as a solicitor; however, this was refused by the Full Court of Supreme Court as he had not been an articled clerk for the required five years. He was subsequently admitted.

In 1861, the Robertson Land Acts were opposed by the Legislative Council and the Premier, Charles Cowper, appointed 21 new members, including Hellyer, to swamp the council. Before administering the oath to the new members, the President of the Council, Sir William Burton, announced his resignation and left the chamber, with other members following his example. In the absence of a presiding officer, the council was adjourned. As this was the final day of the final day of the five-year term of the council, Hellyer was unable to take his seat. He was not nominated to the reconstituted council.

== Death ==
Hellyer died in January 1885 (aged 64), his wife Margaret predeceased him, dying on 20 November 1880 (aged 57). His son, Thomas Hellyer, was also a solicitor, practicing from the same Sydney premises from 1885, and had been a member of the New South Wales Legislative Assembly from 1882 to 1884.
