= Arthur River, Tasmania =

Arthur River
- Town
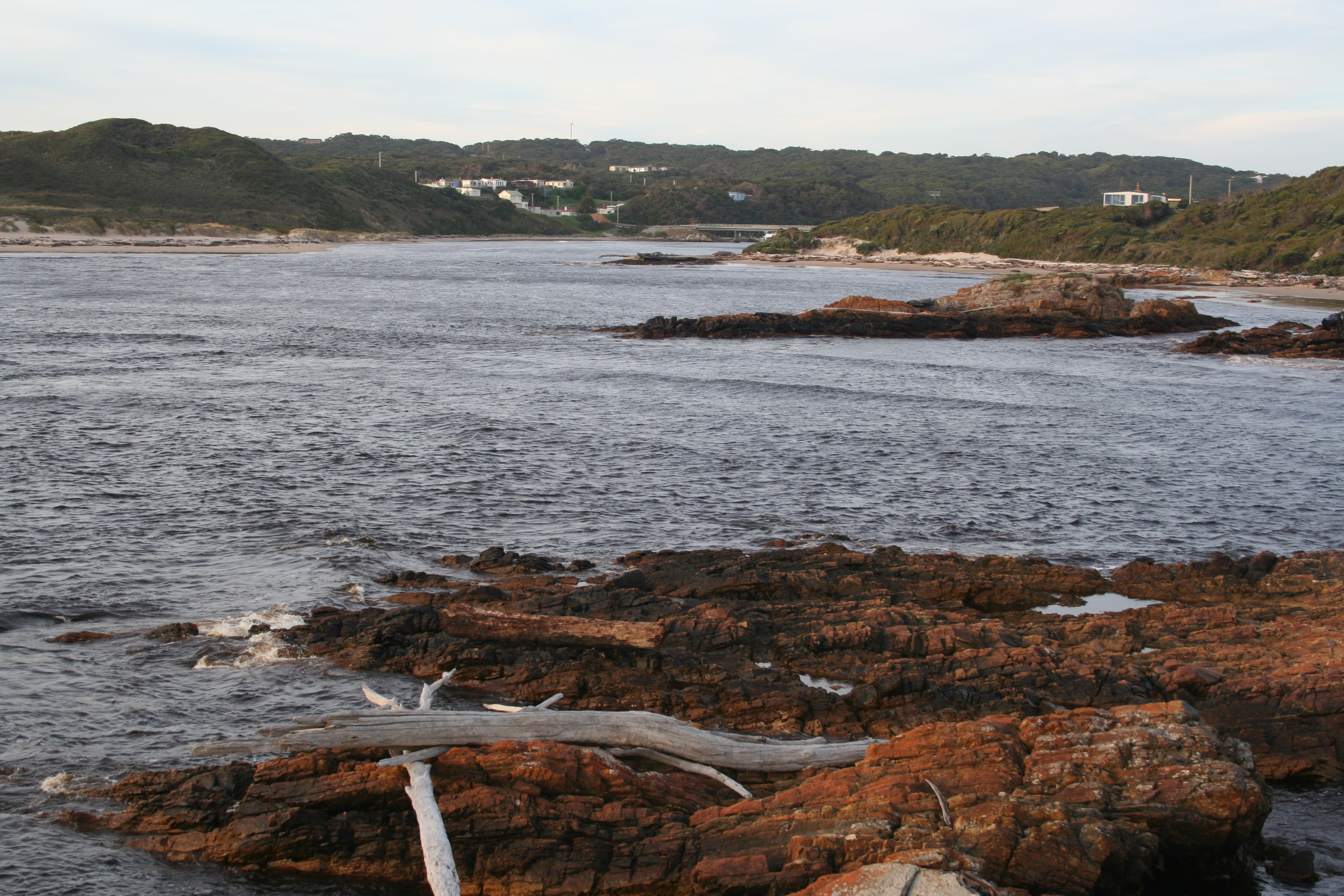
- Mouth of the Arthur River

- Coordinates: 41°03′13″S 144°40′04″E
- Country: Australia
- State: Tasmania
- LGA: Circular Head Council
- Location: 448 km (278 mi) NW of Hobart; 194 km (121 mi) W of Devonport; 64 km (40 mi) SW of Penguin

Government
  - State electorate: Braddon
  - Federal division: Braddon

Population
  - Total: 32 (2021 census)
- Postcode: 7330

Arthur River is the name of a small township on the northern part of the West Coast of Tasmania, Australia. At the 2021 census, Arthur River and the surrounding area had a population of 32.

It is south of the town of Marrawah. Named after Sir George Arthur, Lieutenant Governor of Van Diemens Land (1824–36), the town draws its name from the river. The river is fed by several tributaries including the Frankland River, which was named after its discoverer, George Frankland, then the colony's surveyor-general. The region has been exploited commercially for timber and fisheries, but today is mostly a centre for tourism. Bushwalking, fishing and four-wheel-driving are the most common activities undertaken by travellers in the region to get a glimpse of the unspoiled wilderness. The population in the area peaks during the summer months when shack users come here to enjoy the weather.

On the coast near the mouth of the Arthur River is a plaque titled The Edge of the World. North West Coast Tasmania, and a poem by tourism pioneer Brian Inder, who coined the term, referring to the coastline at Arthur River which is regularly lashed by the gales of the Roaring Forties.
