= Frankland River (North West Tasmania) =

River in Tasmania, Australia

Frankland
- Location of the Frankland River mouth in Tasmania
- Etymology: George Frankland

Location
- Country: Australia
- State: Tasmania
- Region: North-west

Physical characteristics
- Source confluence: Horton and Lindsay rivers
  - location: Sumac Forest Reserve
  - coordinates: 41°15′4″S 144°57′25″E
  - elevation: 164 m (538 ft)
- Mouth: Arthur River
  - location: east of the town of Arthur River
  - coordinates: 41°04′29″S 144°46′19″E
  - elevation: 22 m (72 ft)
- Length: 41 km (25 mi)

Basin features
- River system: Arthur River catchment

The Frankland River is a major perennial river in the north-west region of Tasmania, Australia.

== Location and features ==
Formed by the confluence of the Horton and Lindsay rivers, the Frankland River rises in the Sumac Forest Reserve and flows generally west by north. The Frankland River reaches its mouth in remote country east of the settlement of Arthur River where it empties into the Arthur River. The river descends 142 metres (466 ft) over its 41-kilometre (25 mi) course.

The river draws its name from George Frankland, an English surveyor and Surveyor-General of Van Diemen's Land between 1827 and 1838.

== See also ==
- Rivers of Tasmania
