= The Nut (Tasmania) =

Volcanic plug near Stanley, Tasmania

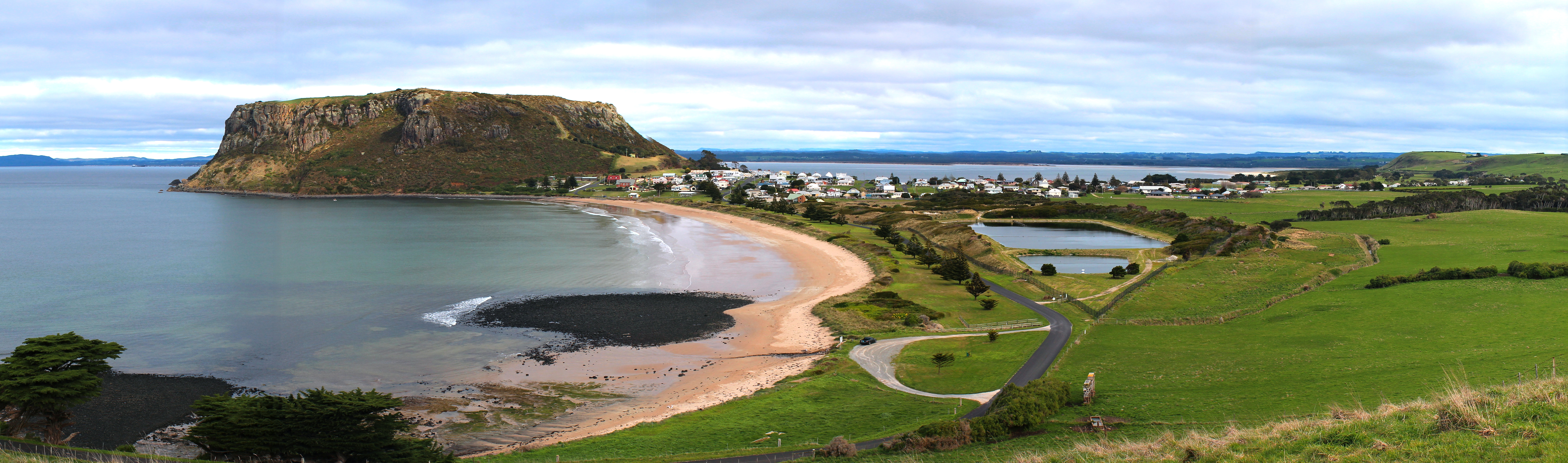

Highest point
- Elevation: 143 m (469 ft)
- Prominence: 142 m (466 ft)
- Isolation: 0.63 km (0.39 mi)
- Coordinates: 40°45′49″S 145°18′11″E

Geography
- Location: North West Tasmania, Australia

The Nut is a volcanic plug near the town of Stanley, Tasmania. It is formed from basanite dated to 12.5 and 8.5 million years old, the remains of the solidified core of an extinct volcano that was active about 25–70 million years ago. It has an elevation of 143 metres (469 ft) above sea level. It is one of at least 120 volcanic centres recognized across the state.

The Nut's geological characteristics have important implications for the local environment providing unique habitats for flora and fauna, including breeding sites for various bird species.

The basaltic rocks weather to form fertile red soil, which is valuable for agriculture in northwestern Tasmania.

== History ==
The areas around it are culturally significant to the local Tarkine Aboriginal people because of stone formations, middens, quarries and artefact scatters near the area.

The European discovery of the Nut was made by George Bass and Matthew Flinders when they circumnavigated Tasmania in the sloop Norfolk. The origins of its name are speculated to be from the Tasmanian Aboriginal name, "munatrik" (moo-nut-re-ker), or because explosives were unable to dent it during the construction of a breakwater.
