= Thomas Hellyer =

Politician and solicitor in New South Wales, Australia (1840–1889)

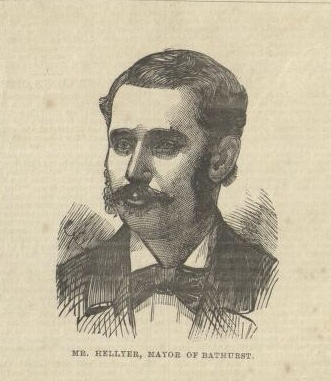
- Born: Thomas Henry Hellyer; 1840; Bathurst, New South Wales, Australia
- Died: 5 April 1889 (aged 48–49); Liverpool, New South Wales
- Occupations: Politician and solicitor
- Spouse: Rose Anne Parfitt (1862–death)
- Children: 12
- Father: William Hellyer

Thomas Henry Hellyer (1840 – 5 April 1889) was an Australian politician and solicitor.

== Biography ==
He was born in 1840 at Bathurst to solicitor William Hellyer, and Margaret née Gray. On 25 April 1862, he married Rose Anne Parfitt, with whom he had twelve children. A solicitor, he practised from 1867, first in Sydney, then in Parramatta from 1869, Bathurst from 1878, and Sydney again from 1885, sharing the same Sydney premises as his father.

He was the mayor of Bathurst for 1880, and 1881.

In 1882 he was a candidate for the New South Wales Legislative Assembly. He stood for Bathurst at the election on Saturday 2 December, but was narrowly defeated with a margin of 16 votes (1.6%), but was elected unopposed for the neighbouring district of West Macquarie the following week. He resigned in 1884 for unknown reasons.

Hellyer had a cancer removed, however it returned in December 1888, and he died at Liverpool in 1889 (aged 49).

New South Wales Legislative Assembly
Preceded by Charles Pilcher	Member for West Macquarie; 1882 – 1884	Succeeded by Lewis Lloyd
Civic offices
Preceded by William Butler	Mayor of Bathurst; 1880 – 1881	Succeeded by Francis Halliday
