= Nutter =

Nutter may mean:

== People ==
- Nutter (surname)
- Nutter Thomas (1869-1954), Anglican Bishop of Adelaide, South Australia

== Places ==
- Nutter, Netherlands, a town
- Nutter Center, an entertainment arena near Dayton, Ohio, United States

== Other uses ==
- The Nutters, UK comic strip
- Nutter McClennen & Fish, an American law firm
- Britannia Coconut Dancers or Nutters
- Nutters of Savile Row, a tailor shop
- A fan of Scottish singer Paolo Nutini
- British slang for a mad or eccentric person

== See also ==
- Dog nutter, online slang for a person overly devoted to their dog
- Fluffernutter, a sandwich made with peanut butter and marshmallow fluff
