= Arthur River (Tasmania) =

River in Tasmania, Australia

Arthur (Tunganrick)
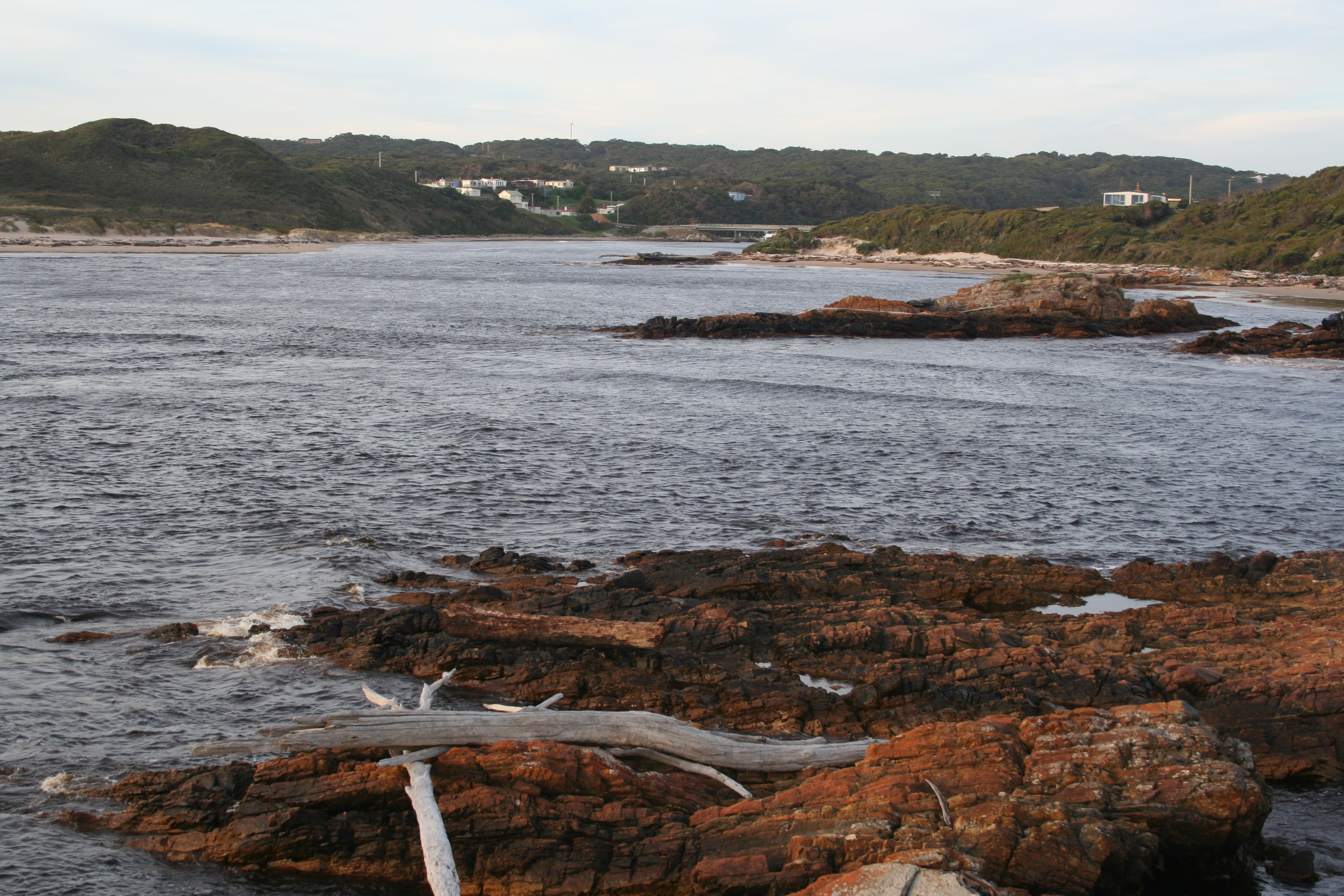
- The mouth of the Arthur River

- Location of the Arthur River mouth in Tasmania
- Etymology: Sir George Arthur

Location
- Country: Australia
- State: Tasmania
- Region: North-west

Physical characteristics
- Source: Magnet Range
  - location: south of Waratah
  - coordinates: 41°29′43″S 145°25′30″E
  - elevation: 479 m (1,572 ft)
- Mouth: Southern Ocean
  - location: town of Arthur River
  - coordinates: 41°03′22″S 144°39′21″E
  - elevation: 0 m (0 ft)
- Length: 172 km (107 mi)

Basin features
- Tributaries
  - left: Keith River, Lyons River (Tasmania), Rapid River (Tasmania), Julius River, Frankland River (Tasmania)
  - right: Waratah River, Wandle River (Tasmania), Hellyer River, Salmon River (Tasmania)
- National park: Savage River National Park

The Arthur River (Peerapper: Tunganrick) is a major perennial river in the north-west region of Tasmania, Australia.

== Location and features ==
The Peerapper language were spoken by Tasmanian Aborigines in the area but became extinct during the 19th century.

The Arthur River rises on the slopes of the Magnet Range, south of Waratah and flows generally north and then west, around the northern perimeter of the Savage River National Park. The river is joined by 25 tributaries including the Waratah, Wandle, Hellyer, Keith, Lyons, Rapid, Julius, Salmon and Frankland rivers. The Arthur River reaches its mouth at the settlement of Arthur River where it empties into the Southern Ocean. The river descends 480 metres (1,570 ft) over its 172-kilometre (107 mi) course.

The river was named in honour of Sir George Arthur, the Lieutenant Governor of Van Diemens Land between 1824 and 1836.

On the coast near the river mouth is a plaque titled The Edge of the World. North West Coast Tasmania, and a poem by tourism pioneer Brian Inder, who coined the term, referring to the coastline at Arthur River which is regularly lashed by the gales of the Roaring Forties.

== See also ==
- Rivers of Tasmania
