= Trefoil Island =

Island in Tasmania, Australia

Coordinates: 40°38′S 144°41′E

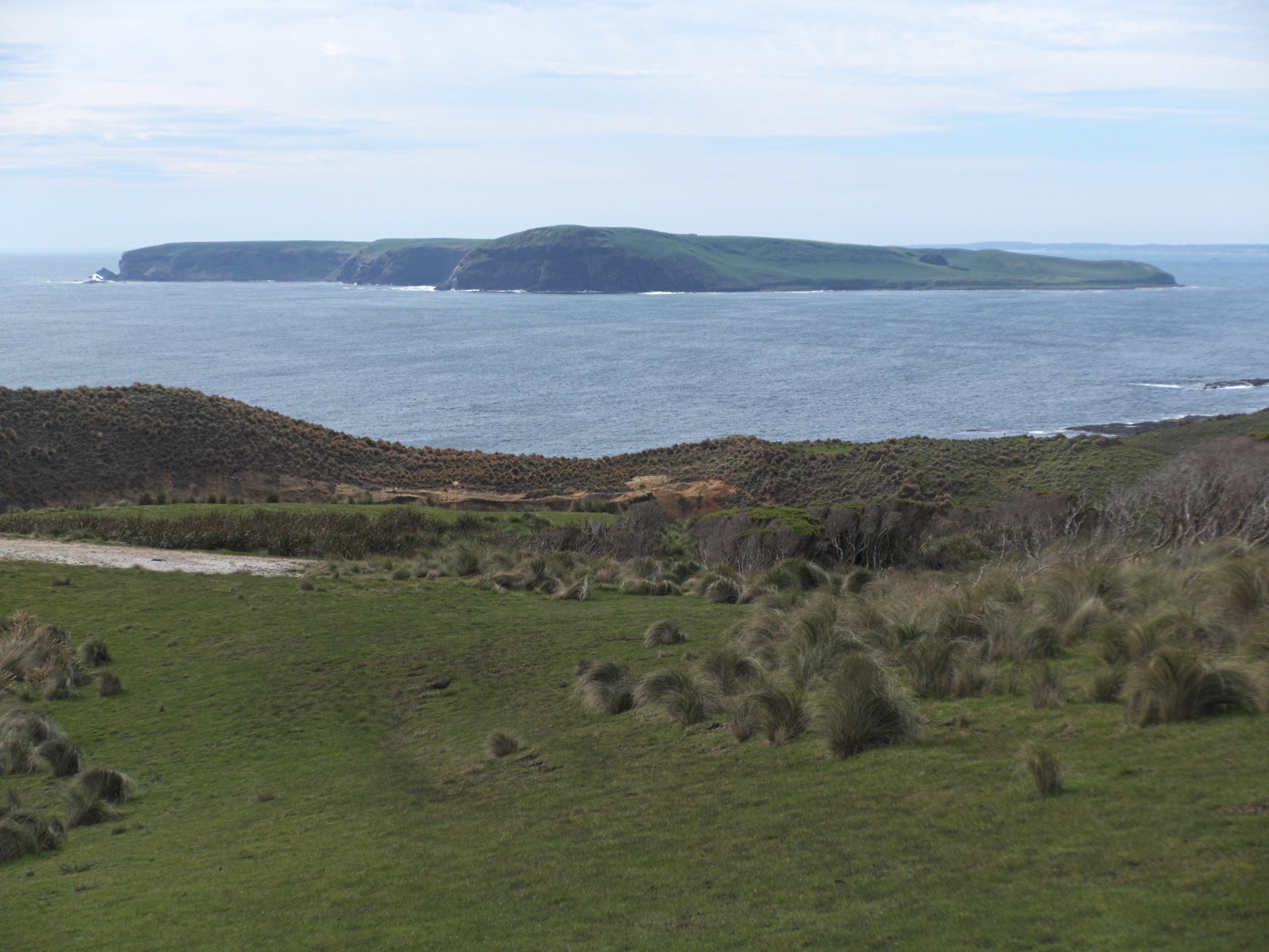
Trefoil Island seen from Cape Grim.

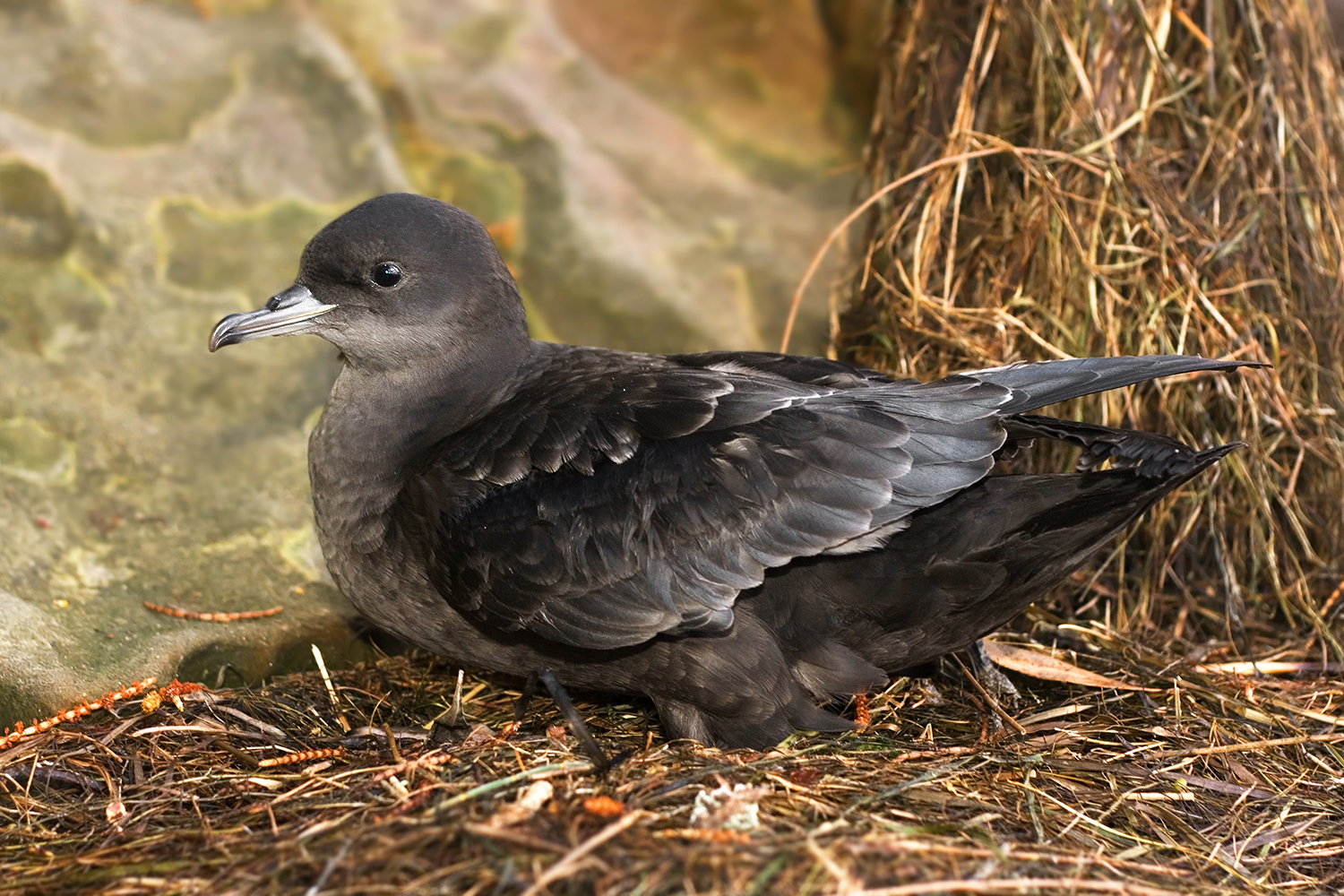
The island is a major breeding site for short-tailed shearwaters, or Tasmanian muttonbirds

Trefoil Island (in palawa kani : Titima), officially known as titima / Trefoil Island, is an island with an area of 115.79 ha, in south-eastern Australia. It is part of Tasmania’s Trefoil Island Group, lying close to Cape Grim, Tasmania's most north-westerly point, in Bass Strait. It is owned by the Trefoil Island Aboriginal Cooperative and is home to an estimated 1.5 million breeding pairs of short-tailed shearwaters, which are subject to annual muttonbirding activities. Approval is required to visit.

There is an airstrip, otherwise small boats can be used on calm days at Kelp Beach. The shoreline is covered with pebbly rocks.

== Trefoil Island Group ==
Trefoil Island Group consists of:

- Trefoil Island
- Harbour Islets
- Henderson Islets
- Little Trefoil Island
- Murkay Islets
- Seacrow Islet, aka Seacrow Island
- Shell Islets
- The Doughboys

== Fauna and flora ==
The island forms part of the Hunter Island Group Important Bird Area. Apart from the short-tailed shearwaters, breeding seabird and shorebird species include little penguin, Pacific gull, silver gull, sooty oystercatcher and pied oystercatcher. The Cape Barren goose also breeds on the island. Reptiles include metallic skink and the introduced tiger snake.

The main vegetation is silver tussock Poa poiformis with a few small patches of bracken fern Pteridium esculentum. The only trees on Trefoil are six specimens of Cupressus macrocarpa.

== The Kay Family Calamity ==
In 1895, the Kay family, who ran sheep on the island, visited the island. Albert Boyes Kay, his pregnant wife and two children attempted to return to the mainland but were thrown from the boat and drowned.

The surviving six children watched from Trefoil island. Belinda Maud, Lydia May, Albert Boys, Jane Georgina, Wintena Alberta and Robert were now entirely alone on the inhospitable island. The eldest, Belinda, was just thirteen years old.

The six siblings survived on Trefoil island for six weeks by killing livestock and keeping a rescue fire burning. They were saved by James Parker of the May Queen.
