= Doughboy Island =

Doughboy Island may refer to:

== Australia ==
=== Tasmania ===
- Doughboy Island (Tasmania), a small island in the Furneaux Group between Flinders Island and Barren Island in Bass Srait off northeast Tasmania
- The Doughboys (Tasmania), a pair of islands off Cape Grim, Tasmania

=== Victoria ===
- Doughboy Island (Victoria), a small island in Corner Inlet

== United States ==
- Doughboy Island, a small island in Bluffton, South Carolina

== See also ==
- Dough Boy (disambiguation)
