= Doughboy (disambiguation) =

Doughboy is a former nickname for an American infantryman, especially one from World War I.

Dough boy, Doughboy, Doughboys, etc. may also refer to:

== Places ==
=== Australia ===
- Doughboy, Queensland, a locality in the Bundaberg Region
- Doughboy River, a river in Mapoon, Queensland, Australia
- Hemmant, Queensland, Australia, historically called Doughboy Creek
- The Doughboys (Tasmania), a pair of islands off Cape Grim, Tasmania

=== New Zealand ===
- Doughboy Bay, a bay on the western side of Stewart Island, New Zealand

=== United States ===
- Doughboy, Nebraska, a community in the United States
- Doughboy Park, a public park in Queens, New York City, United States

=== Other ===
- Doughboy Island (disambiguation), any of several islands worldwide

== Arts, entertainment, and media ==
=== Characters ===
- Pillsbury Doughboy, a character in advertisements for the Pillsbury Company
- Doughboy (character), a fictional character in the Marvel Universe
- Darrin "Doughboy" Baker, a character in the film Boyz n the Hood
- Dough Boy, a steward in Moby Dick

=== Films ===
- Doughboys (film), a 1930 film starring Buster Keaton
- Dough Boys, a 2008 film directed by Louis Lombardi
- Dough Boys (film), a 2009 film

=== Music ===
- Doughboy (record producer) (born 1989), American hip hop producer
- Doughboys (Canadian band), 1980s-90s Canadian alternative rock band
- The Doughboys (American band), an American rock band from Plainfield

=== Other uses in arts, entertainment, and media ===
- The Doughboy (Ivone), a sculpture by Arthur Ivone
- Doughboy (video game), a 1984 game for the Commodore 64, later ported to the Famicom in 1985 as Dough Boy
- Doughboys (podcast), a comedy podcast about chain restaurants

== Military ==
- Doughboy Award, an American military honor
- Doughboy helmet or Brodie helmet, used by British and American troops in World War I

== Other uses ==
- Fried dough, also known as "doughboys", a deep-fried yeast dough snack

== See also ==
- Philippe "Dough Man" Dauman (born 1954) U.S. businessman
- Doughboy Island (disambiguation)
- Doe Boy (disambiguation)
