= Steep Island =

Steep Island may refer to:

- Steep Island, Australia, an island in Bass Strait between northwest Tasmania and King Island
- Steep Island, Hong Kong, an island off the eastern coast of Sai Kung Peninsula
- Guishan Island (Yilan), an island off the northeastern coast of Yilan, Taiwan, also known as Steep Island
