= Little Trefoil Island =

Island in Tasmania, Australia

Coordinates: 40°39′S 144°42′E

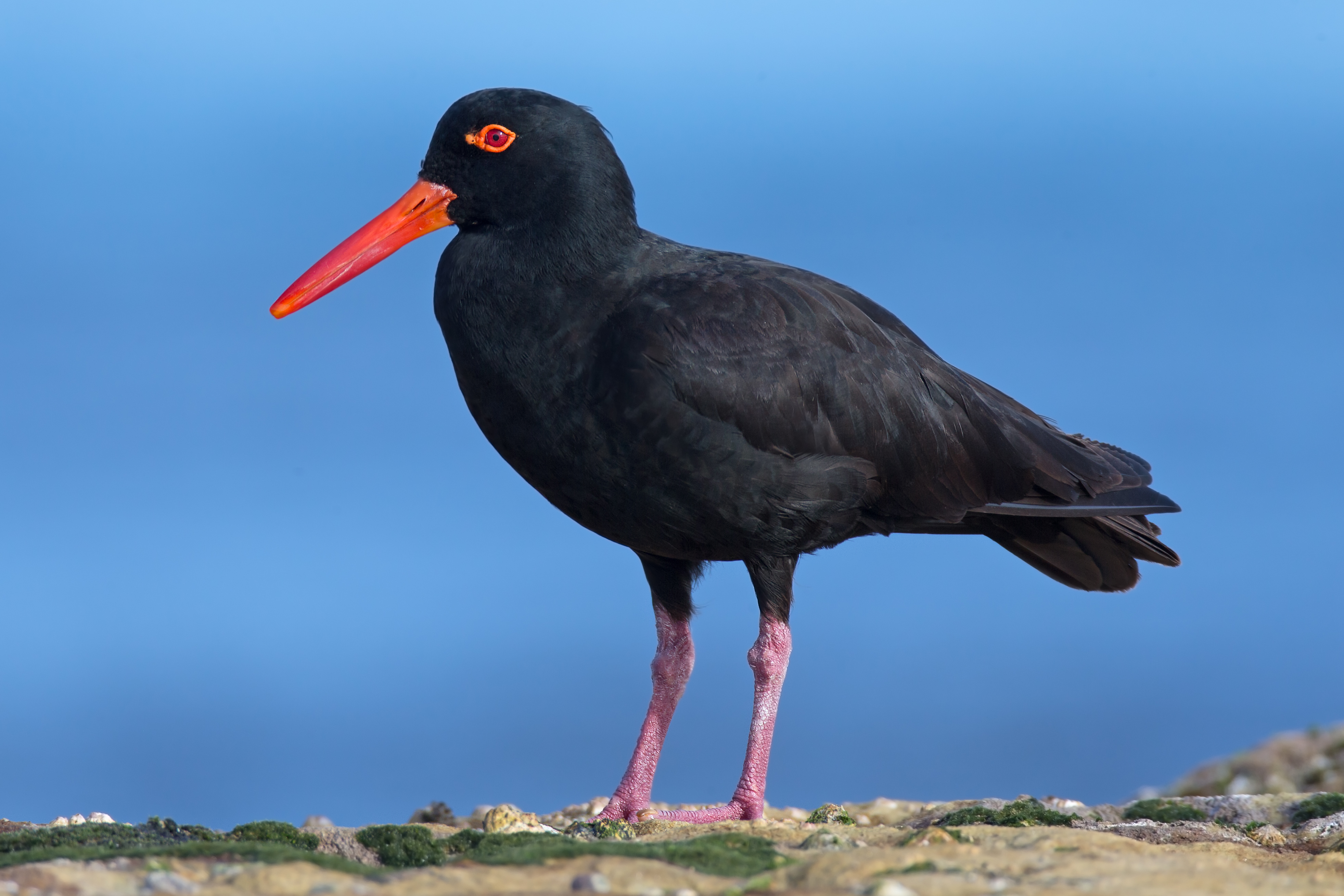
The island is a breeding site for sooty oystercatchers

Little Trefoil Island is a small island with an area of 0.64 ha, in south-eastern Australia. It is part of Tasmania’s Trefoil Island Group, lying close to Cape Grim, Tasmania's most north-westerly point, in Bass Strait.

== Fauna ==
The island forms part of the Hunter Island Group Important Bird Area. Breeding seabird and shorebird species include little penguin, common diving-petrel, Pacific gull, silver gull and sooty oystercatcher. The metallic skink is present.
