= Bird Island (Tasmania) =

Island off the coast of Tasmania, Australia

Coordinates: 40°36′S 144°43′E

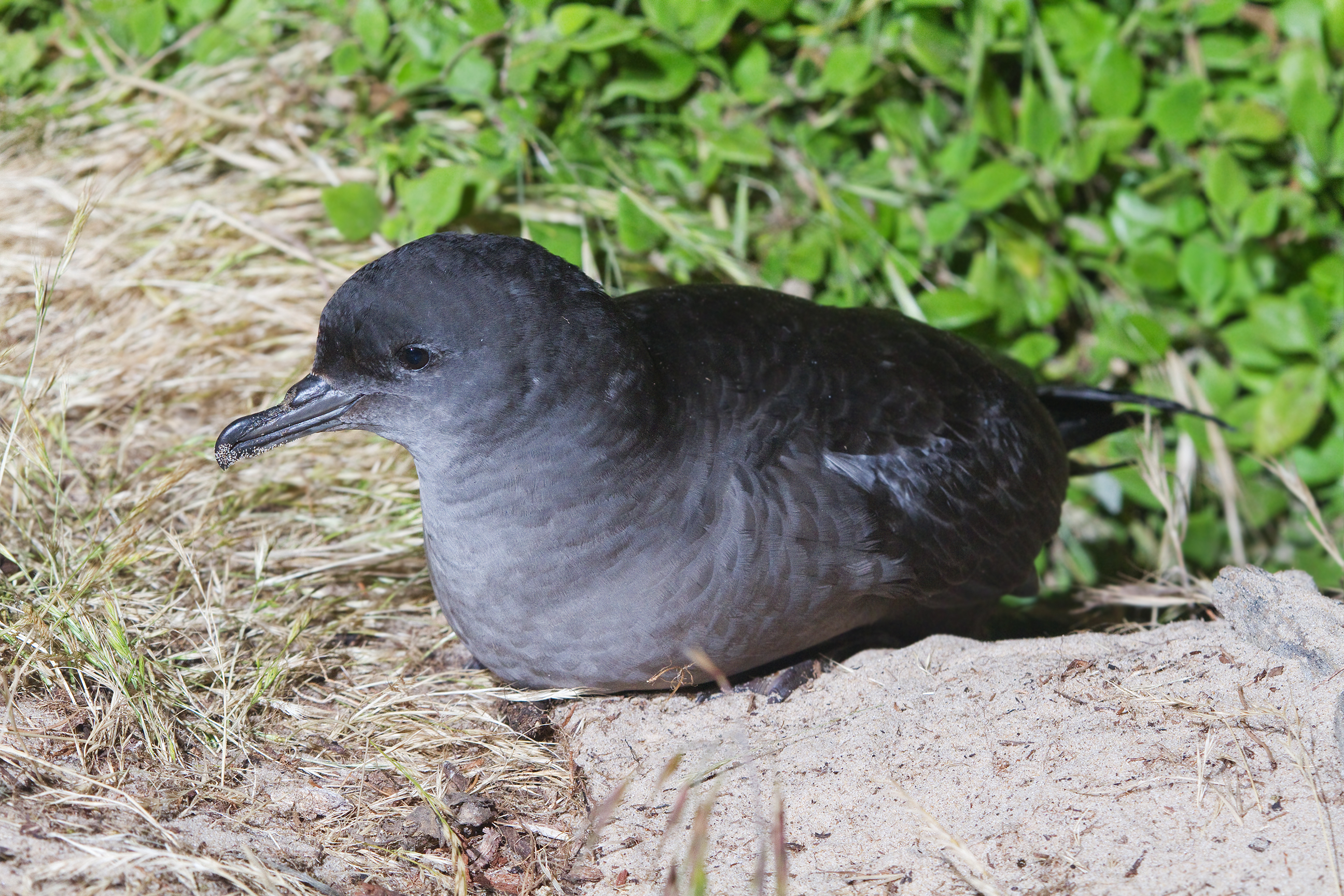
The island is a breeding site for short-tailed shearwaters, or Tasmanian muttonbirds

Bird Island is an island game reserve, with an area of 43.92 ha, in Bass Strait, south-eastern Australia. It is part of Tasmania’s Hunter Island Group which lies between north-west Tasmania and King Island. It is home to about 5,000 pairs of short-tailed shearwaters, the young of which are harvested annually, and about 3,000 pairs of little penguins.

== Fauna ==
The island forms part of the Hunter Island Group Important Bird Area. As well as the shearwaters and penguins, other breeding seabirds and shorebirds include white-faced storm-petrel, Pacific gull, silver gull and sooty oystercatcher. Reptiles include the metallic skink and abundant tiger snakes.
