= Cape Grim massacre =

Massacre in Tasmania (1828)

Cape Grim/Kennaook (Tasmania)

The Cape Grim massacre was an attack on 10 February 1828 in which a group of Aboriginal Tasmanians gathering food at a beach in the north-west of Tasmania is said to have been ambushed and shot by four Van Diemen's Land Company (VDLC) workers, with bodies of some of the victims then thrown from a 60-metre (200 ft) cliff. About 30 men are thought to have been killed in the attack, which was a reprisal action for an earlier Aboriginal raid on a flock of Van Diemen's Land Company sheep, but part of an escalating spiral of violence probably triggered by the abduction and rape of Aboriginal women in the area. The massacre was part of the "Black War", the period of violent conflict between British colonists and Aboriginal Australians in Tasmania from the mid-1820s to 1832.

News of the Cape Grim killings did not reach Governor George Arthur for almost two years. Arthur sent George Augustus Robinson, who held an unofficial government role as an Aboriginal conciliator, to investigate the incident, and later statements from company workers, a diary entry by the wife of a ship's captain and the testimony of an Aboriginal woman provided some further information. Despite the witness statements however, details of what took place are ambiguous. Some Australian authors such as Keith Windschuttle have subsequently disputed the magnitude of the massacre or denied it occurred at all.

The site of the massacre has been identified as the present-day Taneneryouer, formerly known as Suicide Bay, facing the island outcrops known as The Doughboys. Because a number of tribes were in the area at the time, it is uncertain which one was involved in the clash, although historian Lyndall Ryan states that those killed were members of the Peerapper clan.

== Background ==
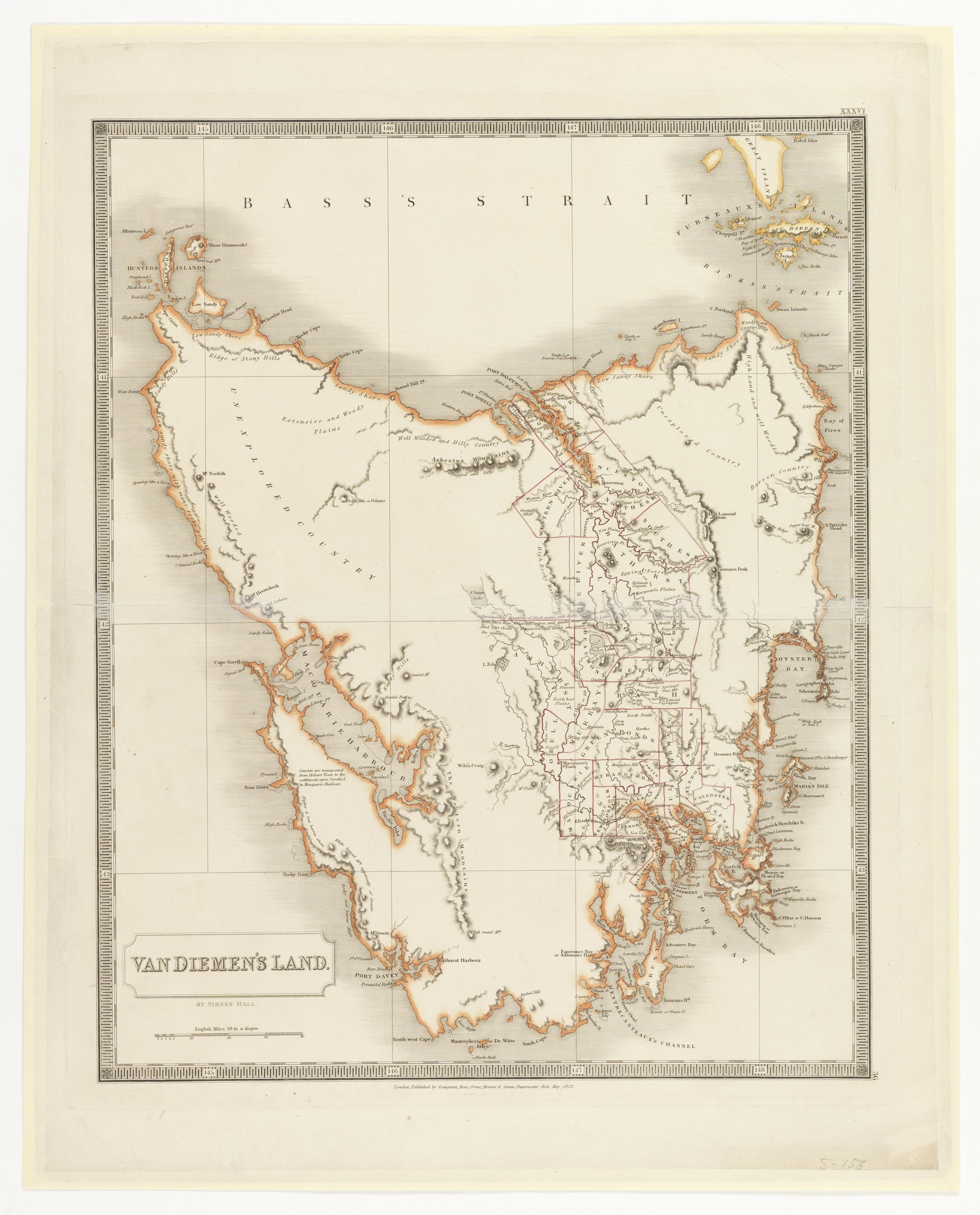
Van Diemen's Land, 1828

Clans of the North West nation had experienced violent conflict with European settlers since 1810 when sealing parties abducted women. In 1820 a group of sealers sprang from hiding in a cave at The Doughboys near Cape Grim/Kennaook and ambushed a group of Pennemukeer women collecting muttonbirds and shellfish, capturing and binding them and carrying them off to Kangaroo Island. Pennemukeer men responded with a reprisal attack, clubbing three sealers to death.

Further conflict developed after the arrival of the VDLC in late 1826. The company had been formed in London in 1824 as a joint stock company whose purpose would be to breed and farm Merino and Saxon sheep on a large scale to meet the high demand for wool in England. The company was given a grant to 100 thousand hectares (250 thousand acres) in the northwest tip of the colony then known as Van Diemen's Land, an area that was home to about 400 or 500 Aboriginals who had cleared the grassy plains of trees through generations of fire-stick farming. Ships then began arriving to offload livestock and labourers – mostly indentured "servants" or convicts who would work as shepherds and ploughmen on sheep stations at Cape Grim/Kennaook and Circular Head, occupying key Aboriginal kangaroo hunting grounds.

Businessman Edward Curr was appointed as VDLC's Chief Agent, answering to a court of directors in London, but his position in the remote part of the colony also gave him the powers and authority of a magistrate. Curr quickly developed a reputation as a cruel and ruthless despot. Within a year of the company establishing a presence in the North West, employees under his direct control had gained a reputation for brutal treatment of the local Aboriginal population. Curr, rather than inquiring into or intervening in such cases, sometimes actively encouraged violence. Rosalie Hare, the wife of a ship's captain who arrived in January 1828 on board the Caroline and remained in the Curr household until March, noted in her journal the frequency of Aboriginal attacks on shepherds, but added: "We are not to suppose the Europeans in their turn take no revenge. We have to lament that our own countrymen consider the massacre of these people an honour. While we remained at Circular Head there were several accounts of considerable numbers of natives having been shot by them, they wishing to extirpate them entirely if possible."

According to historian Nicholas Clements, the primary cause of conflict was sex: very few white women were in the colony generally, and the shortage was particularly acute in the North West, where only Curr's wife and one other woman lived. The Governor was warned by one worker in 1827 that Curr's shepherds "had designs of violating the (native) women" and examples were later given to Robinson of female Aboriginals being kept by stock keepers and shepherds, some of them "chained up like a wild beast" and abused. Another woman was said to have been kept by a stock keeper for about a month, "after which she was taken out and shot."

== Massacre ==
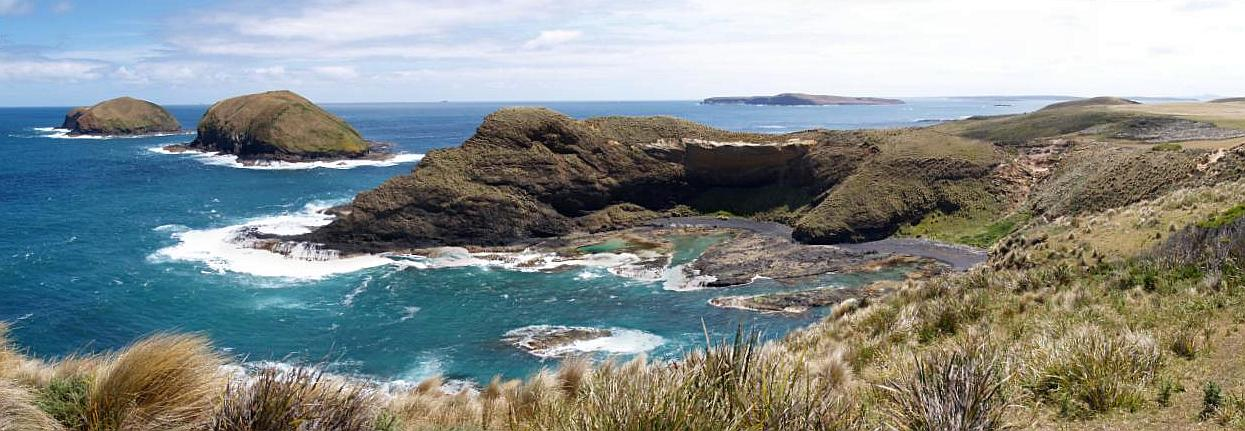
Taneneryouer at Cape Grim, the scene of the events of 10 February 1828. The steep cliff face is at the centre, with the path to the beach, which includes the site of a midden, near the right. The Doughboys are on the left.

The immediate catalyst of the February killings was an incident about the beginning of December 1827 during a visit to the area by the Peerapper clan from West Point in search of muttonbird eggs and seals. Convicts who were working as assigned servants for the VDLC were tending to a large flock of sheep and managed to lure some Peerapper women into a hut for sex. When the Peerapper men objected, a skirmish developed during which one of the shepherds, Thomas John, was speared in the leg and several Peerapper men including a chief were shot dead. John was taken back to Circular Head a fortnight later and Curr reported the injury to VDLC directors in London, stating that his shepherd had been speared in an extended conflict that had begun when "a very strong party of Natives" attacked the men.

A party of Peerapper, probably led by Wymurrick, returned to Cape Grim/Kennaook on 31 December, a month after the clash, to seek retribution. They destroyed 118 ewes from the company's stock, spearing some, beating others with waddies and driving the rest over a cliff and into the sea. The company vessel Fanny, with its master, Richard Frederick, was then sent to Cape Grim/Kennaook, ostensibly to collect sheep to be transported to Emu Bay (modern-day Burnie). While he was there, Frederick, who was "very well acquainted with that part of the country and with the habits of the Natives" – helped the shepherds search for the Peerapper clan and located their camp as part of a punitive expedition. Then, according to a journal account by Rosalie Hare, wife of the captain of the Caroline who was staying with Curr and his wife, they killed 12 men in a surprise night time raid.

Several days later, on 10 February – about six weeks after the destruction of the ewes – the same four shepherds are believed to have surprised and trapped a party of Aboriginal men, women and children in what is now known as Taneneryouer, as they feasted on mutton-birds the women had caught at the nearby Doughboy Islands. Although there is no single definitive narrative, it is thought that the Aboriginal people, confronted by the armed Europeans, panicked and fled in different directions, with some rushing into the sea, others scrambling around the cliff and some fatally shot by the shepherds. One group – thought to be all men – were killed near the edge of a 60-metre (200 ft) cliff and their bodies then thrown to the rocks below. Two individuals, one of the convicts involved and an Aboriginal woman, stated that the death toll was 30, a senior VDLC employee described the fatalities as "a good number" and "a great many", while Curr initially reported six dead "besides several severely wounded". Those wounded by shot fired from muskets would have had poor prospects of survival.

== Investigation ==
In a dispatch to VDLC directors on 14 January Curr reported the voyage of the Fanny and the subsequent night time encounter with Peerapper at their camp by Frederick and the shepherds who had "gone in quest" of those who had slaughtered the sheep. In Curr's account there were about 70 Peerapper in the encampment, but the shepherds watched and waited until dawn before retreating without a shot being fired, because "not a musket would go off" as a result of heavy rain during the night. Historian Ian McFarlane has described Curr's account as problematic and less plausible than that of Rosalie Hare: he said the men would have known the Peerapper were reluctant to move during the night, being timid in the dark, and it was improbable that men armed with that knowledge would sit in the cold and rain all night watching the targets silhouetted by campfires, only to await the light of the morning and lose their strategic advantage.

Two weeks later, on 28 February, Curr provided the directors with his first, brief reference to the events of 10 February. He reported that he had heard information from the men on the Fanny that shepherds had encountered "a strong party of natives" and that after a long fight six Aboriginals were left "dead on the field including their chief besides several severely wounded." He added: "I have no doubt that this will have the effect of intimidating them, and oblige them to keep aloof."

Curr reported nothing more on the incident or what had become of those who had been severely wounded, prompting the directors to write back to express extreme "regret" over the deaths and point out: "It does not appear from the account who were the aggressors." Despite his role as magistrate Curr did not further investigate the clash or notify Governor Arthur of the deaths and outside knowledge of the massacre would have remained negligible had it not been for the decision of embittered VDLC agricultural superintendent Alexander Goldie to write a lengthy letter to Arthur in November 1829 mentioning the encounter. Goldie's letter to Arthur was one of confession of his own involvements in the killing of Aboriginals – notably the shooting and butchering with an axe a woman on a north-west beach two months earlier – and revealed:

There have been a great many Natives shot by the Company's Servants, and several engagements between them while their stock was in that district. On one occasion a good many were shot (I never heard exactly the number) and although Mr Curr knew it, yet he never that I am aware, took any notice of it although in the Commission of the Peace and at that time there was no proclamation against the Natives, nor were they (the Natives) at the time they were attacked at all disturbing the Company's flocks ..."

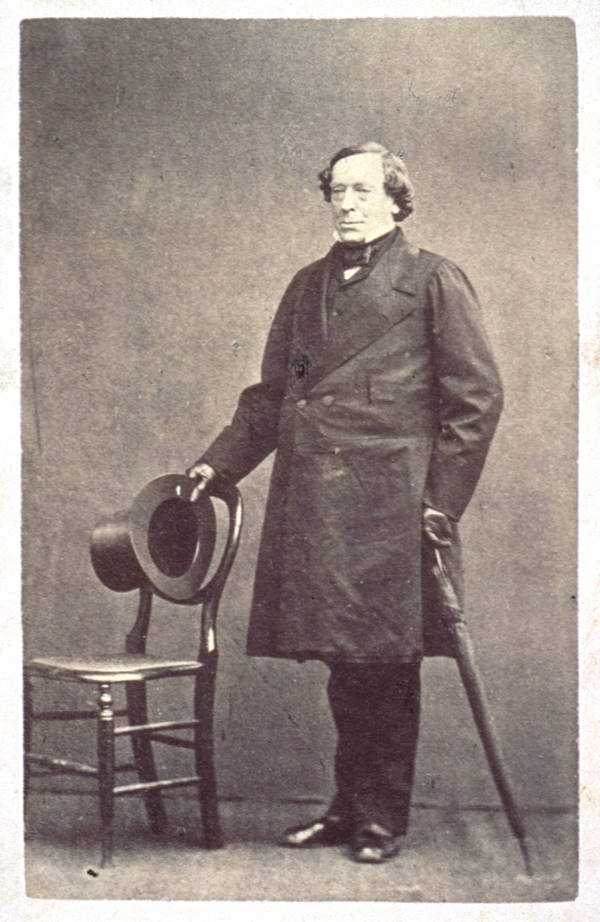
George Augustus Robinson

In a separate, scathing, 110-page letter to VDLC directors Goldie said Curr had personally encouraged the killing of other Aboriginals, offering rum on one occasion to any man who could bring him an Aboriginal head. Arthur responded to Goldie's accusations by asking Robinson to discover what he could about the incident when he ventured to the north-west region as part of his "friendly mission" to Aboriginal Tasmanians. It took until June the following year before Robinson arrived in the area, where on 16 June he interviewed Charles Chamberlain, one of the four convict shepherds involved. He recounted the conversation about events that were by then almost 2 1/2 years in the past:

Robinson: How many natives do you suppose there was killed?

Chamberlain: Thirty.
Robinson: There appears to be some difference respecting the numbers.
Chamberlain: Yes, it was so. We was afraid and thought at the time the Governor would hear of it and we should get into trouble, but thirty was about the number.
Robinson: What did you do with the bodies?
Chamberlain: We threw them down the rocks where they had thrown the sheep.
Robinson: Was there any more females shot?
Chamberlain: No, the women all laid down, they were most of them men.
Robinson: How many was there in your party?
Chamberlain: There was four of us.
Robinson: What had they done to you?

Chamberlain: They had some time before that attacked us in a hut and had speared one man in the thigh. Several blacks was shot on that occasion. Subsequently thirty sheep had been driven over the rocks.

Four days later Robinson questioned a group of Aboriginal women at a sealer's camp adjacent to Robbins Passage, east of Cape Grim/Kennaook. Some related the details of the spearing of Thomas John, the subsequent shooting of an Aboriginal chief and the return of tribe members a few days later to drive sheep off the cliff. They also described the massacre of 10 February, recounting how VDLC shepherds had taken by "surprise a whole tribe which had come for a supply of muttonbirds at the Doughboys, massacred thirty of them and threw them off a cliff two hundred feet in altitude".

On 10 August Robinson encountered convict William Gunchannon, another of the four who had been present at the massacre. Gunchannan admitted his involvement, estimating it had happened about six weeks after the destruction of the sheep, but was reluctant to provide detail. He told Robinson that the Aboriginal group attacked on 10 February had included men and women, but denied knowing whether any had been killed. Robinson later wrote that when he informed him that Chamberlain had already admitted a death toll of about 30, Gunchannan "seemed to glory in the act and said he would shoot them whenever he met them". Robinson did not interview the other two involved in the massacre: Richard Nicholson had previously drowned and John Weavis had since moved to Hobart.

Guided by bushman Alexander McKay, Robinson visited Cape Grim/Kennaook and identified the site of the massacre. At the northern arm of Taneneryouer, Robinson was able to identify the steep cliff over which the Aborigines drove the sheep. Just south of the cliff was a steep path leading down to the beach the Aboriginal women had identified as the site of the massacre. From the accounts gathered and his visit to the site, Robinson formulated what he believed was the most likely scenario of the day as the women swam across to the Doughboys to gather muttonbirds:

They swim across, leaving their children at the rocks in the care of the elderly people. They had prepared their supply of birds, had tied them with grass, had towed them on shore, and the whole tribe was seated around their fires partaking of their hard-earned fare, when down rushed the band of fierce barbarians thirsting for the blood of those unprotected and unoffending people ... Some rushed into the sea, others scrambled around the cliff and what remained the monsters put to death. Those poor creatures who had sought shelter in the cleft of the rock they forced to the brink of the awful precipice, massacred them all and threw their bodies down the precipice.

=== Curr's later explanations ===
VDLC directors, meanwhile, asked Curr to respond to Goldie's long list of complaints and accusations. His reply, on 7 October 1830, included a more comprehensive report on the events of 10 February 1828. Yet it was markedly different to the accounts Robinson had already obtained. Curr explained to VDLC directors that a "very large" Aboriginal party had initially assembled at the top of a hill that overlooked the shepherds' hut. He continued:

There our men saw them and the account they gave me of the transaction was that they considered the natives were coming to attack them again and marched out to meet them, and in the fight which ensued they killed six of the natives one of whom was a woman. This was the manner in which the story was first related to me: nothing was said about the natives being a party of people who were returning from the Islands with birds and fish, nor do I now believe that was the case but I think it probable they were going there. ... I have no doubt whatever that our men were fully impressed with the idea that the natives were there only for the purpose of surrounding and attacking them, and with that idea it would be madness for them to wait until the natives shewed their designs by making it too late for one man to escape. I considered these things at the time for I had thought of investigating the case, but I saw first that there was a strong presumption that our men were right, second if wrong it was impossible to convict them, and thirdly that the mere enquiry would induce every man to leave Cape Grim.

Seven months later, in May 1831, the paths of Arthur and Curr crossed in the central Tasmanian village of Jericho, where the Governor confronted Curr with Robinson's report and told the Chief Agent that if the findings were incorrect then he should say so. In a letter to the Governor, Curr did just that, declaring: "I believe it to be untrue. I have no doubt that some Natives were killed on the occasion, my impression is that the real number was three ... as the case was represented to me by the men themselves at the time they had no alternative but to act as they did."

== Site inspection and speculation ==
The contradictions surrounding accounts of the events of 10 February 1828 have prompted some history writers to carry out their own inspections of the site in order to speculate on the most likely series of events. There is sharp contrast in their conclusions.

Based on his visit to Cape Grim/Kennaook, Windschuttle, has disputed much of Robinson's description of events, concluding that the shepherds could not have launched a surprise attack if the Aboriginals had been sitting on the beach at Taneneryouer. He explained that because the basalt slope above the beach is too steep to climb down, the shepherds would have had to descend via a steep track halfway round the bay in full view of those on the beach, giving the Aboriginals at least five minutes to flee, either by swimming across the bay or out to sea, or going around the rocks at the base of the cliff. He said Robinson's description of Aboriginals seeking shelter "in the cleft of the rock" and then being "forced to the brink of an awful precipice" was equally problematic because of the difficulty for shepherds to force captives up the track while carrying weapons and then – once the Aboriginal people reached the top – the impossibility of preventing their escape over the open grassy land as the shepherds climbed up behind them. He said: "If they really were trying to kill them all, they would have done it where they allegedly found them, down near the waterline at the edge of the bay." Windschuttle said the site's "extraordinarily difficult terrain" coupled with the limitations of 19th century muskets made it beyond belief that four shepherds could have killed 30 Aboriginal people. He said the most credible account was Curr's, in which the shepherds felt threatened by the advancing Aboriginal party and marched from their hut to launch a pre-emptive strike. He also accepted Curr's claim of just six Aboriginal fatalities. Windschuttle said the clash probably took place on the open grassland near Victory Hill (on which he said the hut stood) and if bodies were thrown over a cliff, Victory Hill was the most plausible location from which to do it.

A study of the area by McFarlane, however, raises critical flaws with Windschuttle's version in which the convicts responded with gunfire after being threatened at their hut. McFarlane said surveyors' charts placed the shepherds' hut about 1 kilometre (0.62 mi) to the northeast of Victory Hill, which allowed the company easy access from the sea via Davisons Bay. The hut was well beyond the range of spears thrown by Aboriginal people on the hill, and McFarlane has argued that abandoning the cover of a hut to engage a vastly greater force of Aboriginal people occupying the higher ground would have been "an act of gross stupidity", particularly given that one of the convicts, John Weavis, was a former soldier who had served in the 89th Foot Regiment and York Chasseurs, a regiment raised from military deserters. McFarlane said a musket loaded with shot and fired uphill would have been a poor match for spears that could be thrown with great accuracy as far as 90 metres (300 ft). He wrote: "A large number of Aborigines armed with spears on the high ground would certainly have been victorious. That four shepherds could emerge from that shower of missiles unscathed is beyond the bounds of credibility." Additionally, if the fatal encounter had taken place closer to the shepherds' hut they would have had to carry the bodies of their victims almost 2 kilometres (1.2 mi) – passing Victory Hill on the way – in order to throw them off the cliffs at Taneneryouer. McFarlane said neither Chamberlain, Gunchannon nor the Aboriginal woman interviewed by Robinson had made any mention of the hut or the hill, with the focus of their accounts solely Taneneryouer. He concluded: "Curr's version of events is clearly implausible, without foundation and would appear designed to depict the Aborigines as aggressors by shifting the scene, and thus the nature of the crime, from Taneneryouer to Victory Hill."

McFarlane has postulated that the two contradictory witness accounts of events – Chamberlain's admission of men's bodies being thrown from the cliff and the Aboriginal women's account of the whole tribe, including women and children, being attacked on the beach – were two elements of the one story: the convicts attacked and shot a small group of men who were hunting wallaby on the heights and then fired down on to the women, children and elderly who were close to the sea harvesting seafood. The bodies of the men might later have been thrown upon the rocks. He also suggested a second scenario, which he described as more likely, which involved a midden whose remains are about 10 metres (33 ft) from the top of the path to the beach on a large flattish sandy area. He said if this was the cooking area chosen on the day, the tribe could have been ambushed as they cooked and ate the muttonbirds, and suddenly found themselves trapped between the shepherds and the sea. Alarmed by gunfire, some may have fled down to the beach while others were driven back around the lip of the high ground leading to the cliff top.

== Aftermath ==
According to McFarlane, most of the Aboriginal people of Tasmania's north west were methodically hunted down and killed by VDLC hunting expeditions, acting under Curr's control. He says between 400 and 500 Aboriginal people were living in the region before the company's arrival, but by 1835 their number had dwindled to just over 100. From 1830 Robinson began rounding up the last survivors of the Aboriginal tribes to take them to a "place of safety" on an island off Tasmania's north coast; however those in the north-west avoided him. In 1830 at a sealer's camp Robinson found six abducted Aboriginal women, and an 18-year-old man called "Jack of Cape Grim" from the Parperloihener band of Robbins Island, whose Aboriginal name was Tunnerminnerwait. Robinson threatened the sealers with legal action unless they gave up the Aborigines, and to the Aborigines he promised safety and an eventual return to tribal areas.

== See also ==
- History wars
- List of massacres in Australia
- List of massacres of Indigenous Australians
- Tasmanian Aborigines

== Bibliography ==
- Clements, Nicholas (2014), The Black War, Brisbane: University of Queensland Press, ISBN 978-0-70225-006-4
- Boyce, James (2010), Van Diemen's Land, Melbourne: Black Inc, ISBN 978-1-86395-491-4
- Lennox, Geoff (1990), "The Van Diemen's Land Company and the Tasmanian Aborigines: A Reappraisal", Papers and Proceedings: Tasmanian Historical Research Association, 37 (4), Hobart: 165–208
- McFarlane, Ian (2012). "NJB Plomley's Contribution to North-West Tasmanian Regional History". In Johnston, Anna (ed.). Reading Robinson. Monash University Publishing. pp. chapter 9. ISBN 978-1-921867-31-6.
- McFarlane, Ian (2008), Beyond Awakening, Launceston: Fullers Bookshop, ISBN 978-0-9804720-0-4
- McFarlane, Ian (2003). "Cape Grim". In Manne, Robert (ed.). Whitewash. Black Ink. ISBN 0-9750769-0-6.
- Ryan, Lyndall (2012), Tasmanian Aborigines, Sydney: Allen & Unwin, ISBN 978-1-74237-068-2
- Windschuttle, Keith (2002), The Fabrication of Aboriginal History, Paddington, Sydney: Macleay Press, ISBN 1-876492-05-8
