= Seacrow Islet =

Island in Tasmania, Australia

Coordinates: 40°37′S 144°44′E

Seacrow Islet is a small island with an area of 1.56 hectares (3.9 acres), in south-eastern Australia. It is part of Tasmania’s Trefoil Island Group, lying close to Cape Grim, Tasmania's most north-westerly point, in Bass Strait.

== Fauna ==
Breeding seabird and shorebird species include little penguin, short-tailed shearwater, fairy prion, Pacific gull and sooty oystercatcher. The Cape Barren goose has been recorded breeding.
