= Steep =

Steep may refer to:

== Arts and entertainment ==
- Steep (2007 film), a film about extreme skiing
- Steep (video game), a 2016 video game

== Places ==
=== England ===
- Steep, Hampshire, a village in central Hampshire, England
- Steep Hill, a popular tourist street in the historic city of Lincoln, Lincolnshire, England
- Steep Holm, an English island lying in the Bristol Channel

=== Other places ===
- Steep Island, Australia
- Steep Island, Hong Kong
- Steep Point, westernmost point of the Australian mainland
- Mount Steep, Antarctica

== Science, technology, and mathematics ==
- Slope, an elementary mathematical concept
- Grade (slope), in civil engineering

== People with the surname ==
- Frederick Steep (1874–1956), Canadian amateur football (soccer) player

== Other uses ==
- Steeping, a cooking technique employing soaking
- STEEP analysis, a variant of the PEST analysis business analysis framework
