= Harbour Islets =

Islets in Tasmania, Australia

Coordinates: 40°38′S 144°44′E

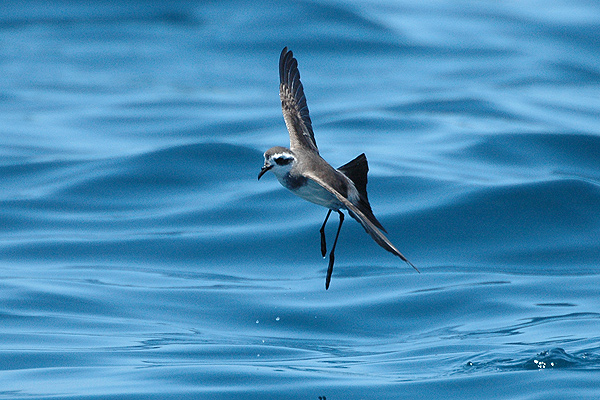
The islets are a breeding site for white-faced storm-petrels

The Harbour Islets are a group of two adjacent small rocky islands, joined at low tide, part of Tasmania’s Trefoil Island Group, lying close to Cape Grim, Tasmania's most north-westerly point, in Bass Strait, with a combined area of 3.13 ha, in south-eastern Australia.

== Fauna ==
The islets form part of the Hunter Island Group Important Bird Area. Recorded breeding seabird and shorebird species include little penguin, short-tailed shearwater, white-faced storm-petrel, Pacific gull, silver gull, sooty oystercatcher, pied oystercatcher and Caspian tern. The mudflats exposed at low tide form a roosting site for waders.
