= Murkay Islets =

Group of small islands in Tasmania

Coordinates: 40.66163°S 144.74435°E

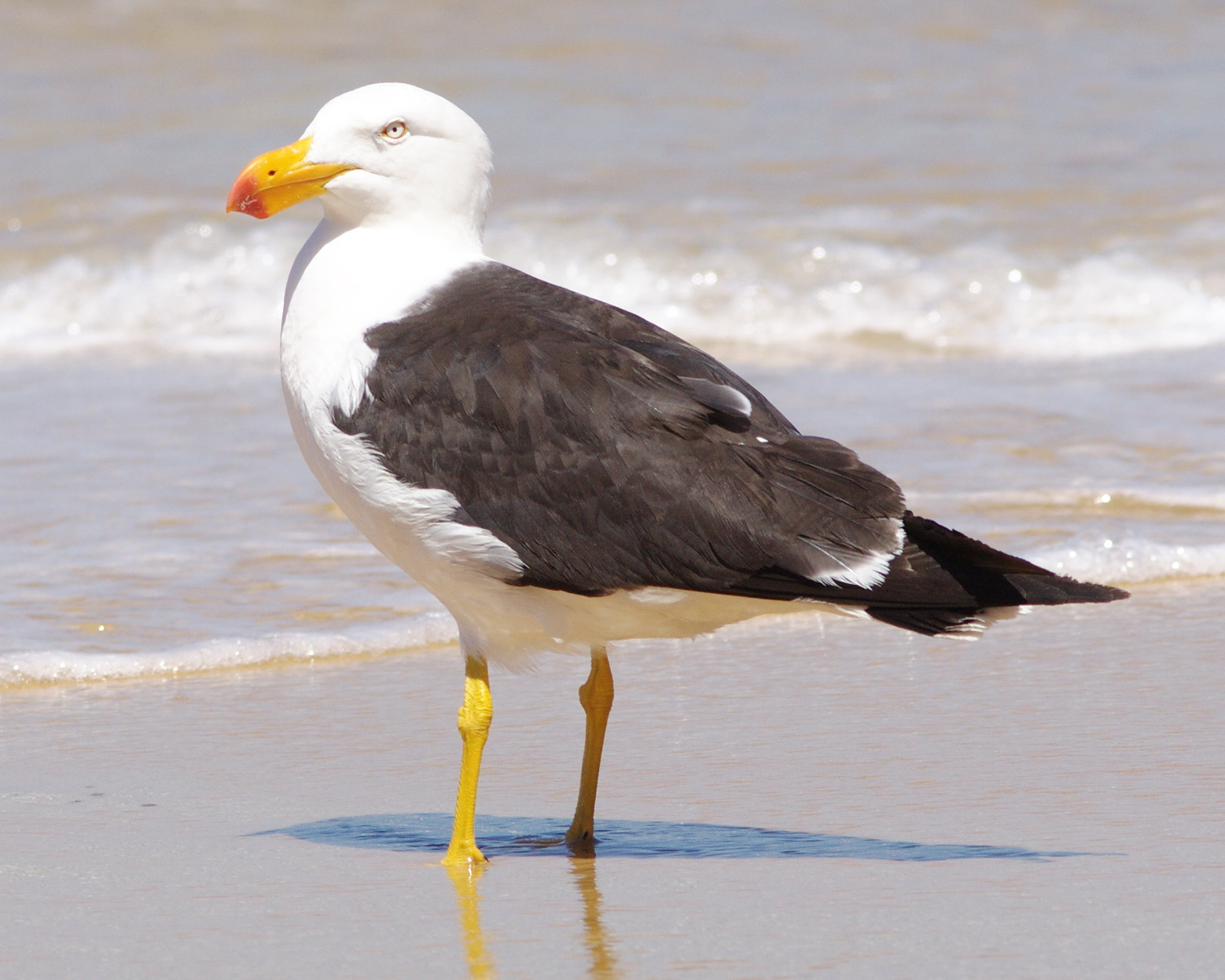
The islets are a breeding site for Pacific gulls

The Murkay Islets are a group of several small rocky islands, some of which are joined at low tide, with a combined area of about 0.5 ha, part of Tasmania’s Trefoil Island Group, lying close to Cape Grim, Tasmania's most north-westerly point, in Bass Strait.

== Fauna ==
The islets form part of the Hunter Island Group Important Bird Area. Recorded breeding seabird and shorebird species include Pacific gull, silver gull, sooty oystercatcher, and Caspian tern.
