= Stack Island =

Island in Tasmania, Australia

Coordinates: 40°36′S 144°46′E

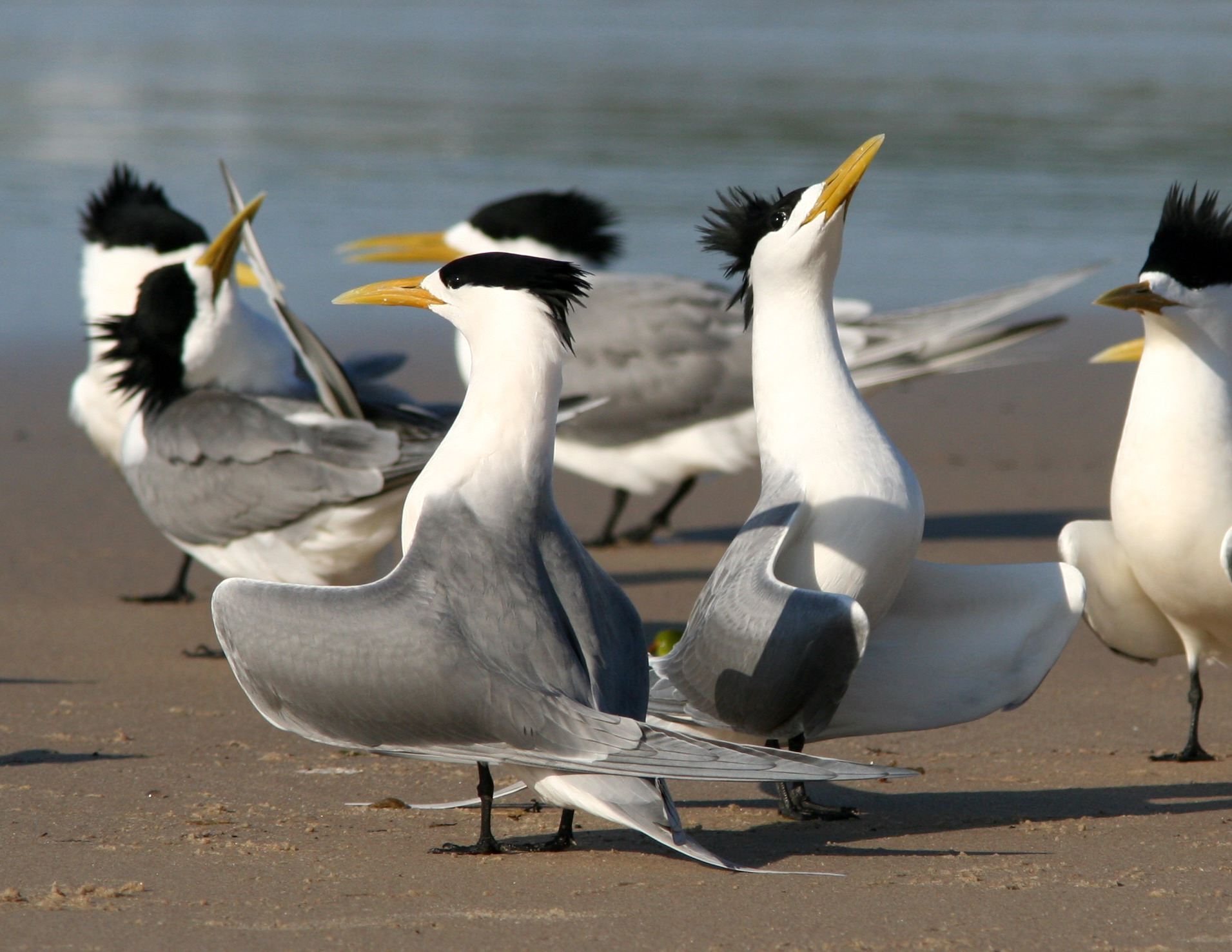
The island is a breeding site for crested terns

Stack Island is an island game reserve, with an area of 23.7 ha and a high point 54 m above sea-level, in Bass Strait, south-eastern Australia. It is part of Tasmania’s Hunter Island Group which lies between north-west Tasmania and King Island.

== Fauna ==
The island forms part of the Hunter Island Group Important Bird Area. Breeding seabirds and shorebirds include little penguin, short-tailed shearwater, Pacific gull, silver gull, sooty oystercatcher, black-faced cormorant, crested tern and fairy tern. Mammals include small numbers of rabbits and rakali.
