= Shell Islets =

Island in Tasmania, Australia

Coordinates: 40°41′S 144°45′E

The Shell Islets are a group of a small islands in south-eastern Australia with two subsidiary islets, surrounded by extensive sand and mudflats at low tide, with a combined high tide area of 0.082 ha. They are part of Tasmania’s Trefoil Island Group, lying close to Cape Grim, Tasmania's most north-westerly point, in Bass Strait.

== Fauna ==
Recorded breeding seabird and shorebird species include sooty oystercatcher, and Caspian tern. The surrounding mudflats are important for waders, especially red-necked stints and sanderlings.
