= Cape Grim Air Archive =

Scientific station in Tasmania

Cape Grim Air Archive (Kennaook/Cape Grim)
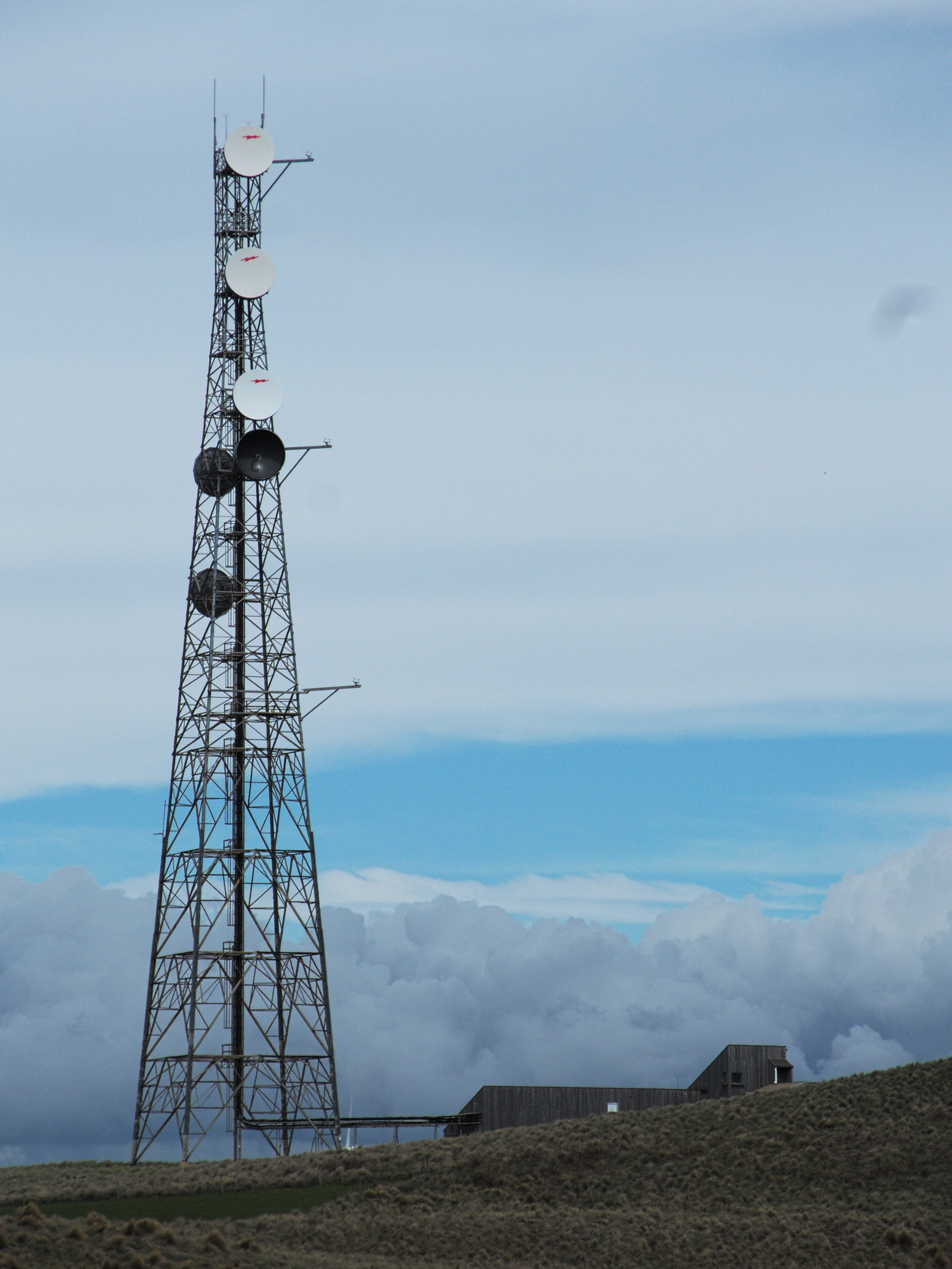
- Cape Grim Baseline Air Pollution Station
- Field of research: atmospheric science
- Location: Cape Grim/Kennaook, Tasmania, Australia; 40°40′59″S 144°41′24″E

Map
- Location in Tasmania where air samples are collected

The Cape Grim Air Archive (CGAA) also "Kennaook/Cape Grim" is a facility of the Australian Bureau of Meteorology's Cape Grim Baseline Air Pollution Station, Tasmania, that aims to collect air samples starting from 1978. The archive is a facility of CSIRO agency. The place was chosen for sampling because air masses there are unaffected by landmasses, with wind coming from the Southern Ocean.

== History ==
The Australian Bureau of Meteorology's Cape Grim Baseline Air Pollution Station was created in 1976 at Cape Grim, Tasmania; the Cape Grim Air Archive was created in 1978, when air samples started to be collected. The archive is a facility of CSIRO. The aim of air sample preservation in the archive was the creation of a collection of air samples taken over a long period of time at the same place so it can be analyzed in the future to obtain data on past atmospheric compositions. As stated by CSIRO, the air archive "would make possible the future reconstruction of atmospheric histories of trace gases and isotopes that had not been previously measured or were yet to be discovered, or to better define records of previously measured species using improved analytical techniques." Cape Grim was chosen as a location for sample collection because air there is transported from the Southern Ocean and is "unaffected by local pollution". CGAA is "the most extensive and utilised resource of its type in existence today".

Other methods of obtaining historical atmospheric composition data that are comparable to continuous sampling, are extraction of air from sealed bubbles in polar ice or from firn, or sampling air from the stratosphere, "where strong stratification restricts the upward propagation of tropospheric air". Main advantages of sampling are:

- Periodicity of sampling, samples can be "collected over periods of minutes to hours providing much higher age resolution"
- No need for corrections due to interfering processes, "vertical atmospheric mixing and exchange across the tropopause in the case of stratospheric samples, and molecular diffusion and gravitational settling in the firn column for air retrieved from ice sheets"
- Sampling process is relatively easy and straightforward and so it is less likely to modify trace gas composition
- Volume of samples are higher than volume of probes obtained from the ice shield, and allow repeated analysis

Sample degradation (caused by corrosion of stainless steel containers used during the first several years of the sampling) and the inability of obtaining samples before 1978 are the main disadvantages of the CGAA.

The first air sample was collected on 26 April 1978; since then 4 to 6 samples were collected each year. As of 2022, more than 170 samples are stored in the archive. Air samples are stored in compressed cylinders. The first cylinders were originally beverage containers that were used by the US military to store breathing oxygen on aircraft during World War II. Since 1980 special containers were made for the archive by Essex Industries (Missouri, USA). Samples are collected using cryogenic assisted filling (liquid nitrogen bath) under 'baseline' conditions, "with winds coming from the south-west sector". Cylinders are filled to a pressure of 900 psig; originally they were "35 litre, internally electropolished, 'watermelon shaped', stainless steel cylinders". Small, non-standard containers were also used, usually for subsampling from degraded or corroded original cylinders. Aluminium cylinders were used since 1986.

The archive is located in Aspendale, Victoria, at the laboratories of CSIRO Marine and Atmospheric Research.

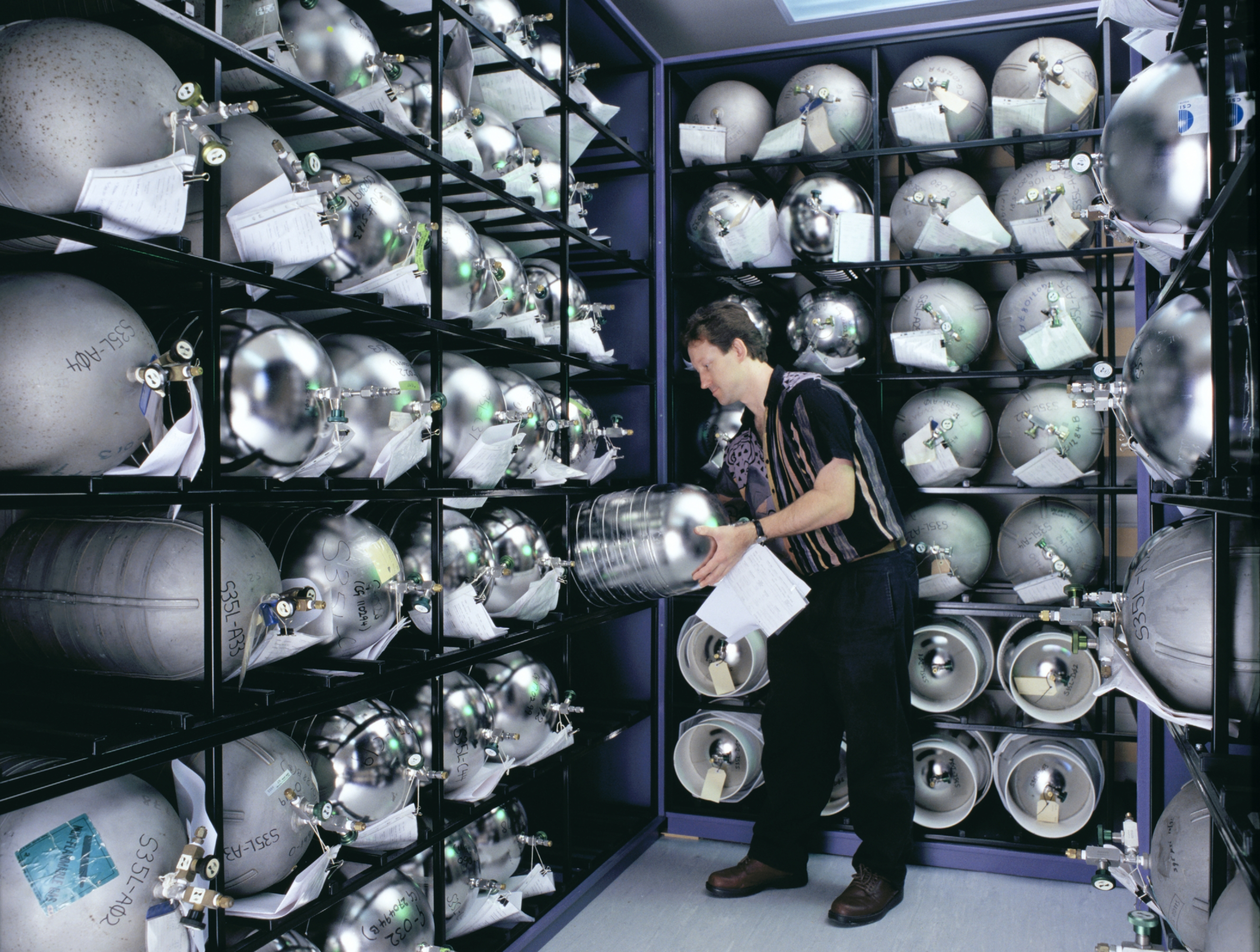
Dr Ray Langenfelds with the air sample archive in Aspendale, Victoria

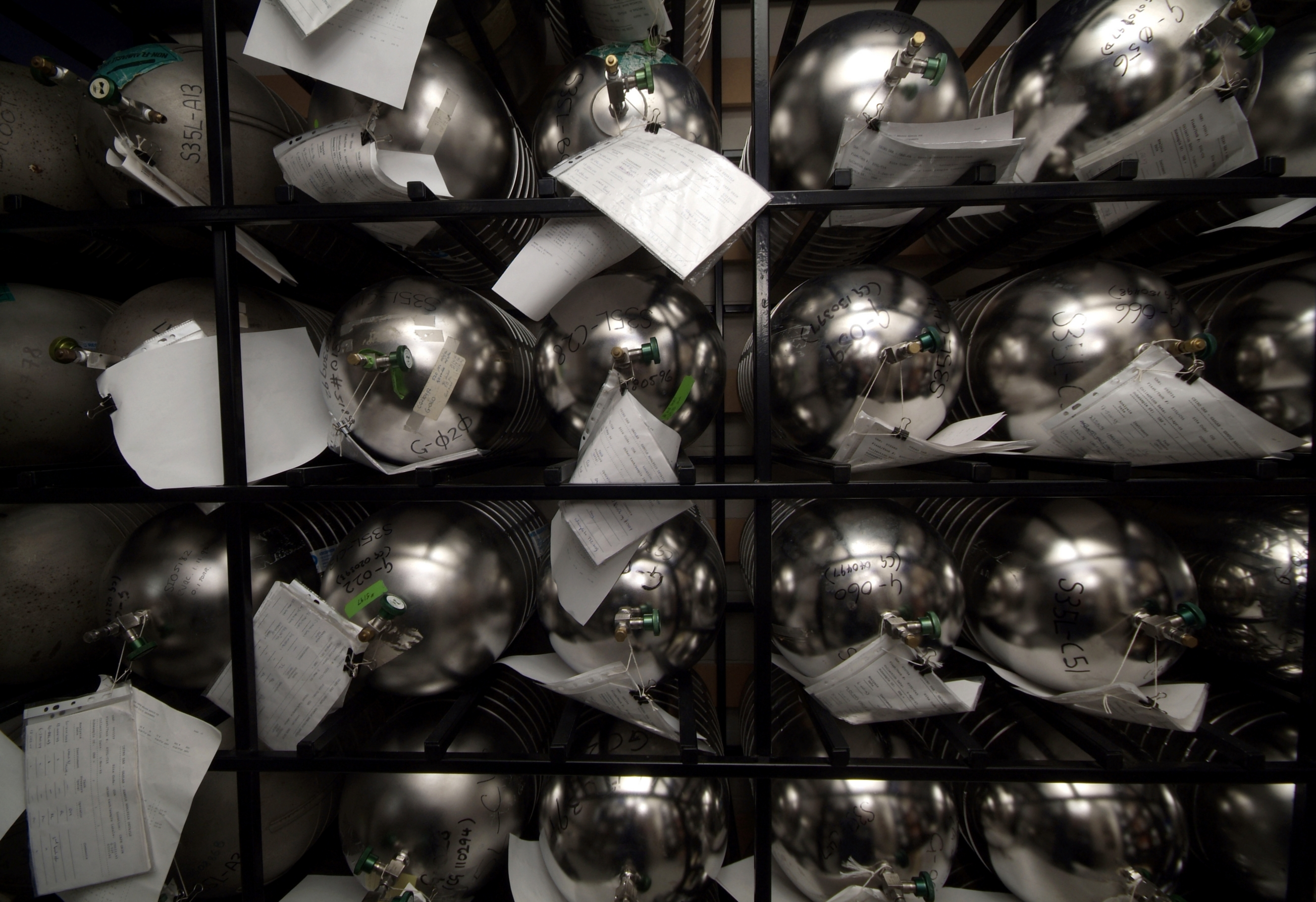
Containers in the Air Archive

Air Archive started its measurements in 1978, but it stores air samples that predate this year. It became possible due to donations of old SCUBA tanks that were filled, sealed, and stored unused. First such donated tank was filled in 1968, as documented in the owner's diving diary.

== Measurements ==
Using samples from the archive, measurements of atmospheric levels of greenhouse gases, ozone-depleting substances, and other trace gases became possible.

After collection, every sample is analyzed and amounts of trace gases are recorded and verified with concurrent Cape Grim data. Out of 175+ samples that were collected since 1978, between 100 and 150 are intact. Hundreds of articles measuring more than 56 different gases were published.
