= Henderson Islets =

Islands in Tasmania, Australia

Coordinates: 40°38′S 144°44′E

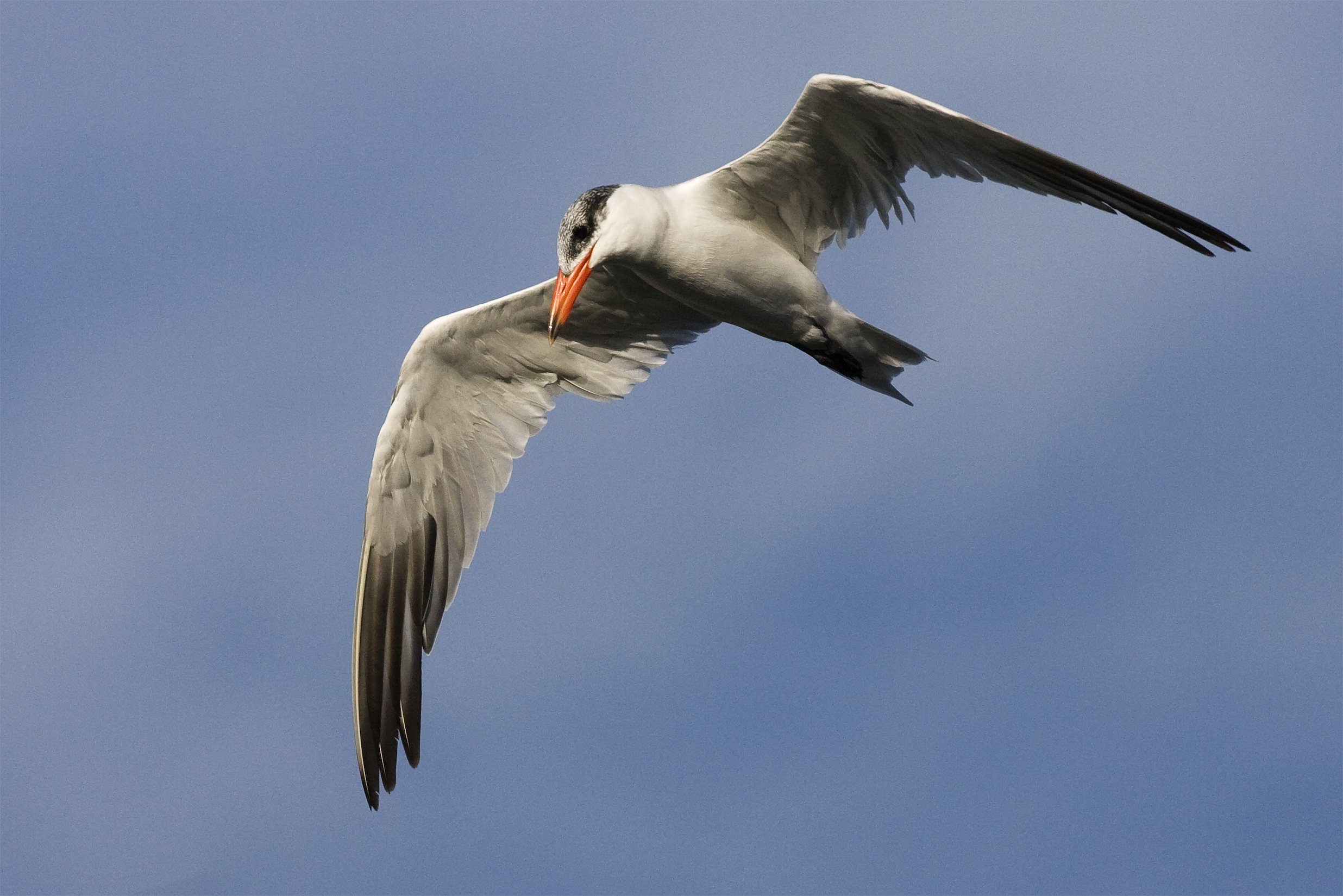
The islets are a breeding site for Caspian terns

The Henderson Islets are a group of two adjacent small rocky islands, with a combined area of 0.41 hectares (1.0 acre), in south-eastern Australia. They are part of Tasmania’s Trefoil Island Group, lying close to Cape Grim, Tasmania's most north-westerly point, in Bass Strait.

== Fauna ==
The islet form part of the Hunter Island Group Important Bird Area. Recorded breeding seabird and shorebird species include little penguin, fairy prion, sooty oystercatcher, black-faced cormorant and Caspian tern.
