= Hunter Island Group Important Bird Area =

Important Bird Area in Tasmania, Australia

Coordinates: 40°28′46″S 144°49′44″E

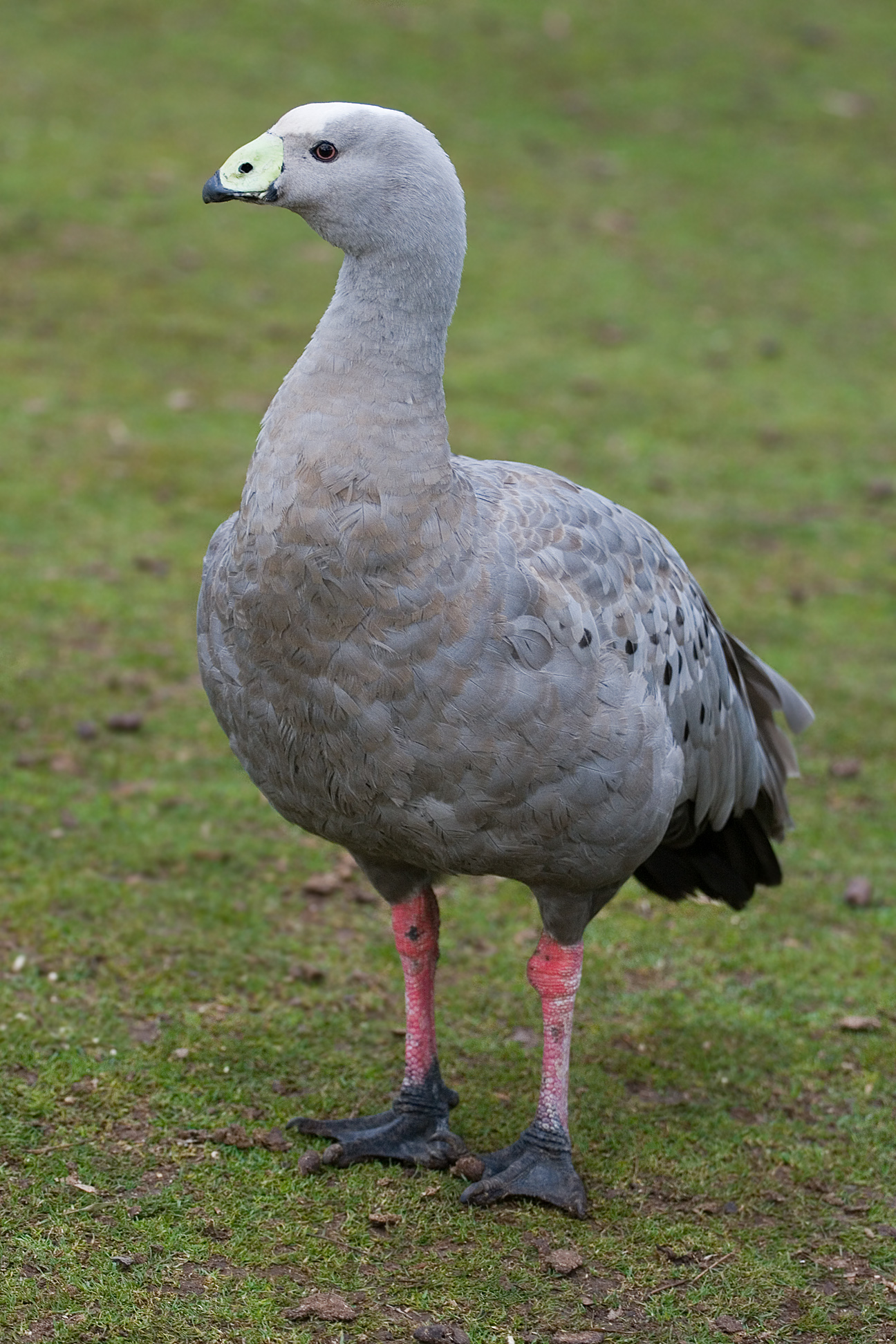
The IBA is an important area for Cape Barren geese

The Hunter Island Group Important Bird Area comprises several islands in the Hunter Island Group and Trefoil Island Group lying off the north-western coast of Tasmania, Australia.

Collectively, they have an area of 152 km^{2}. They have been identified by BirdLife International as an Important Bird Area (IBA) because they support over 1% of the world populations of Cape Barren geese, short-tailed shearwaters, black-faced cormorants, sooty oystercatchers and Pacific gulls. The IBA also supports the critically endangered orange-bellied parrot on its migration route between Tasmania and mainland south-eastern Australia. Most of Tasmania's endemic bird species breed in the IBA.

== Hunter Island Group ==
- Albatross Island, part of the Albatross Island and Black Pyramid Rock Important Bird Area
- Bears Island
- Bird Island
- Black Pyramid Rock, part of the Albatross Island and Black Pyramid Rock Important Bird Area
- Dugay Islet
- Edwards Islet
- Hunter Island
- Nares Rocks
- Penguin Islet
- South Black Rock
- Steep Island
- Stack Island
- Three Hummock Island

== Trefoil Island Group ==
- Trefoil Island
- Little Trefoil Island
- Doughboy Island East
- Doughboy Island West
- Henderson Islets
- Harbour Islets
- Murkay Islets
