= Doe Boy =

Doe Boy may refer to:

- The Doe Boy, a 2001 film written and directed by Randy Redroad
- "Doe Boy Fresh", a song by Three 6 Mafia
- Doe Boy (rapper), American rapper and songwriter

== See also ==
- Doughboy (disambiguation)
