= Steep Island, Australia =

Island in Tasmania Australia

Coordinates: 40°34′S 144°41′E

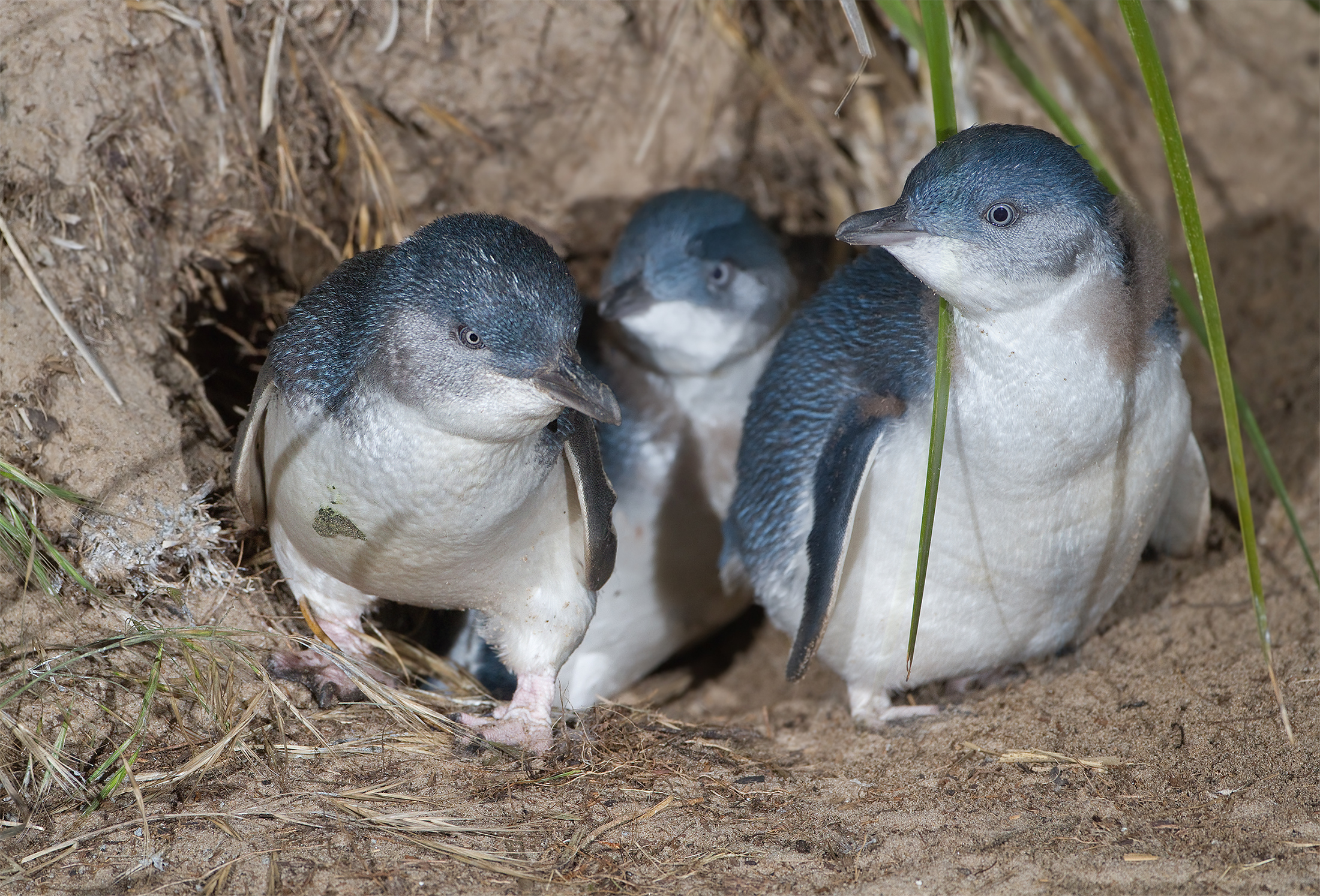
The island is a breeding site for little penguins

Steep Island, also known as Steep Head, is a 21.6 ha island in Bass Strait in south-eastern Australia. It is part of Tasmania’s Hunter Island Group and lies between north-west Tasmania and King Island. It was once used for grazing sheep but title has been transferred to the Tasmanian Aboriginal community; with an estimated 250,000 shearwater burrows present, it is principally used for muttonbirding.

== Fauna ==
The island forms part of the Hunter Island Group Important Bird Area. Breeding seabirds and shorebirds include little penguin, short-tailed shearwater, common diving-petrel, Pacific gull, silver gull, sooty oystercatcher and black-faced cormorant. Tiger snakes have been introduced to the island and pose a threat to breeding seabirds.
