= Doughboy, Nebraska =

Unincorporated community in Nebraska, United States

- Unincorporated Community
- Location within Nebraska Location within the United States
- Coordinates: 42.6°N 101.3°W
- Country: United States
- State: Nebraska
- County: Cherry

Doughboy is an unincorporated community in Cherry County, Nebraska, United States.

== History ==
A post office was established at Doughboy in 1919, and remained in operation until it was discontinued in 1934.
