= Doughboy Island (Victoria) =

Island in Victoria, Australia

- Location within South Gippsland Shire

Geography
- Location: Corner Inlet
- Coordinates: 38°46′15″S 146°16′41″E
- Area: 4 ha (9.9 acres)
- Length: 260 m (850 ft)
- Width: 160 m (520 ft)
- Highest elevation: 24 m (79 ft)

Administration
- Australia
- State: Victoria

Doughboy Island is an uninhabited granite island in Corner Inlet near the northern coast of Wilsons Promontory, in Victoria, Australia.
