= The Doughboys (Tasmania) =

Two Australian islands

Koindrim / The Doughboys
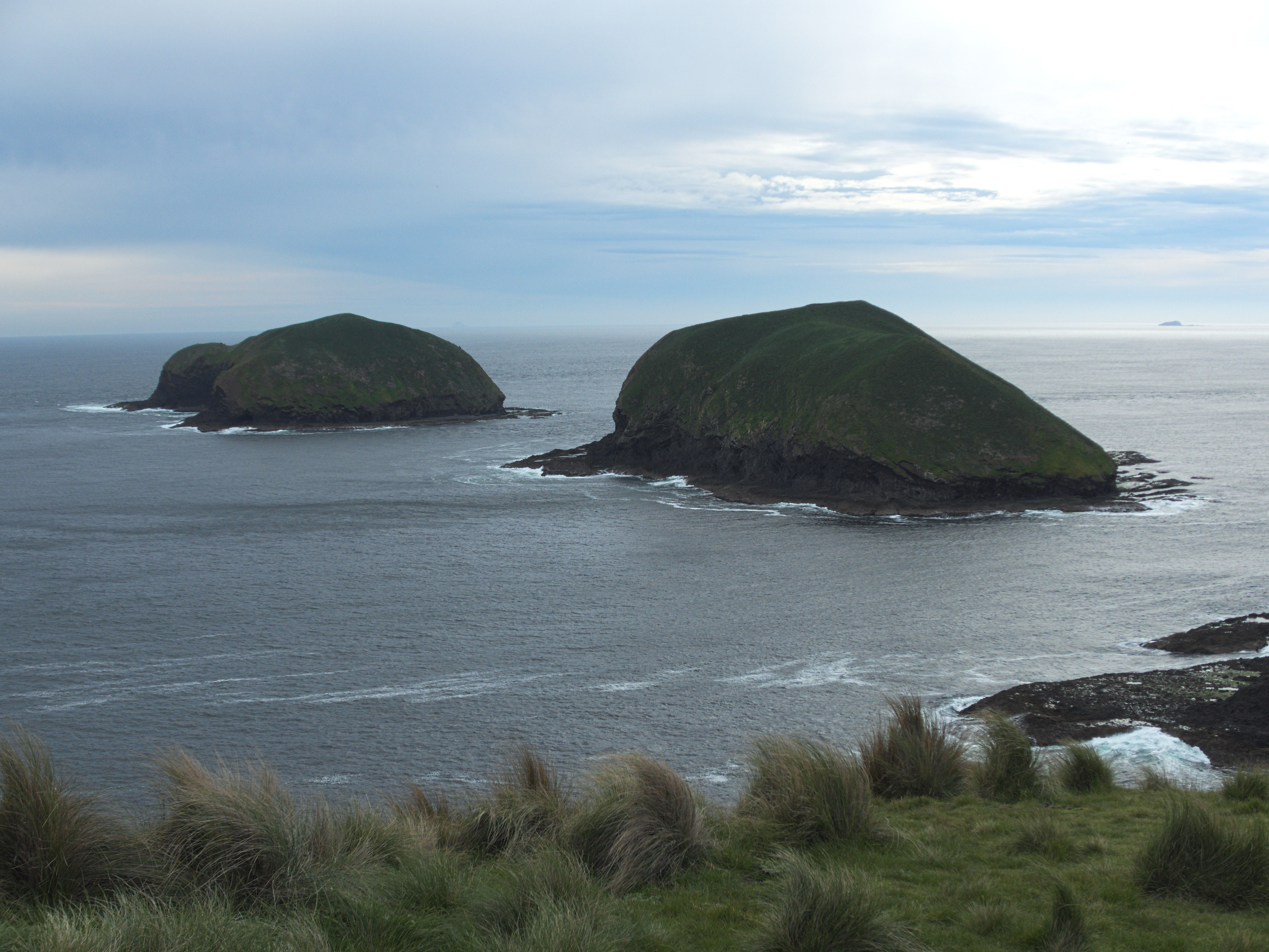
- The Doughboys off Cape Grim, Tasmania

- Location within Tasmania

Geography
- Location: Cape Grim
- Coordinates: 40°40′18″S 144°40′34″E
- Archipelago: Trefoil Island Group
- Total islands: 2
- Area: 12.4 ha (31 acres)

Administration
- Australia
- State: Tasmania

Demographics
- Population: unpopulated

The Doughboys are a pair of islands near Cape Grim, the northwestern point of Tasmania, Australia. The western island has an area of 5.4 hectares (13 acres) and the eastern island has an area of 7 hectares (17 acres). The two islands form part of the Trefoil Island Group.

In June 2021, the Tasmanian Department of Primary Industries, Parks, Water and Environment, after consultation with local Aboriginal groups, approved the dual naming of the island pair as Koindrim. The dual name is intended to be represented in maps and publications as Koindrim / The Doughboys. This followed the approval in March 2021, after similar consultation, of names for the two islands. The eastern island's new name is Kaninerwidic (pronounced (Ka_nina_widic), while the westernmost one is Karrernootong (pronounced Kara_nu_tong).

== Fauna ==
The islands are part of the Hunter Island Group Important Bird Area. Breeding seabird and shorebird species include short-tailed shearwater, fairy prion, common diving-petrel, Pacific gull, silver gull, sooty oystercatcher and pied oystercatcher. Reptiles include metallic skink.

== Gallery ==
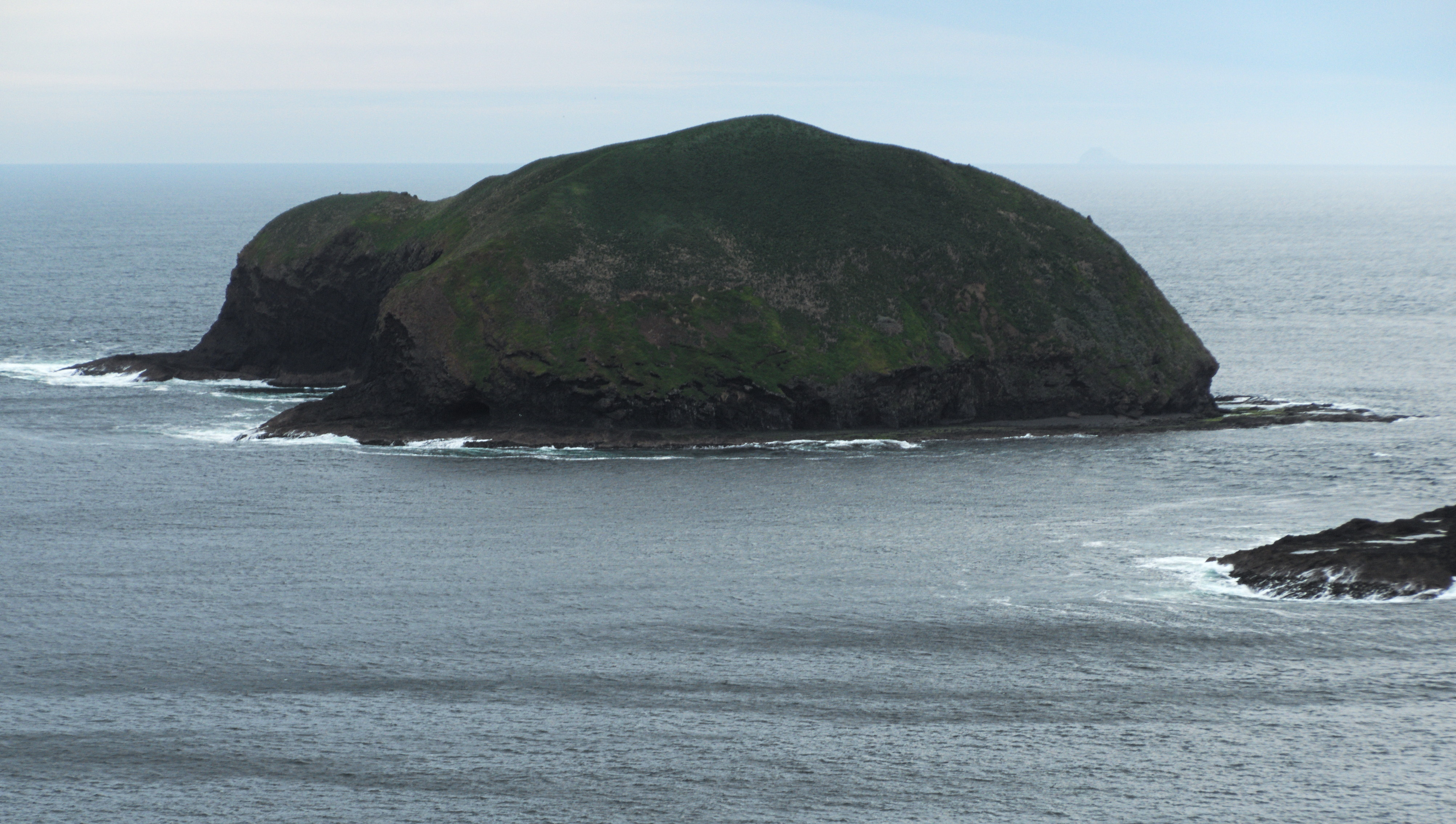
The western of the two islands, furthest from the coast

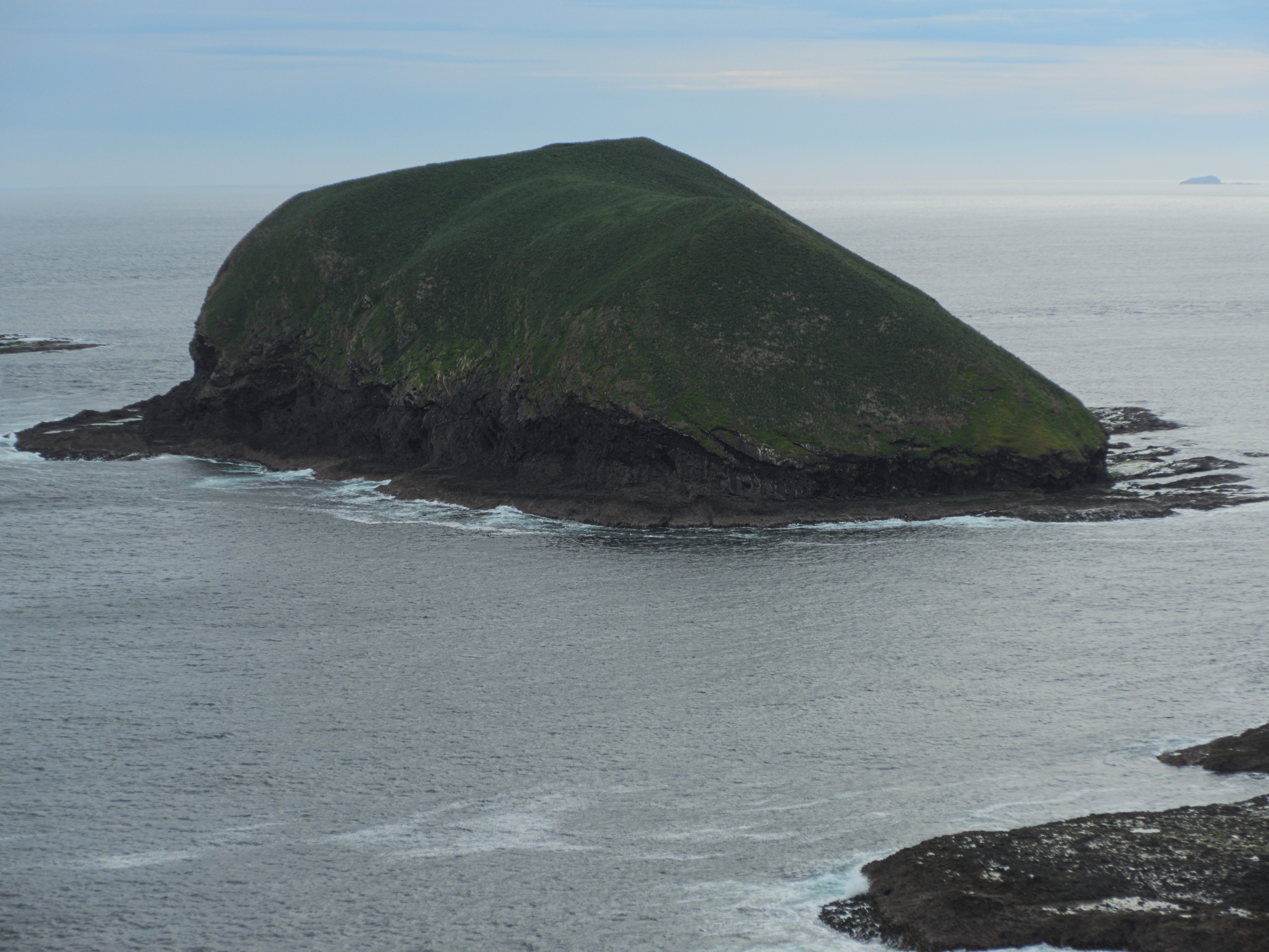
The eastern of the two islands, closest to the coast

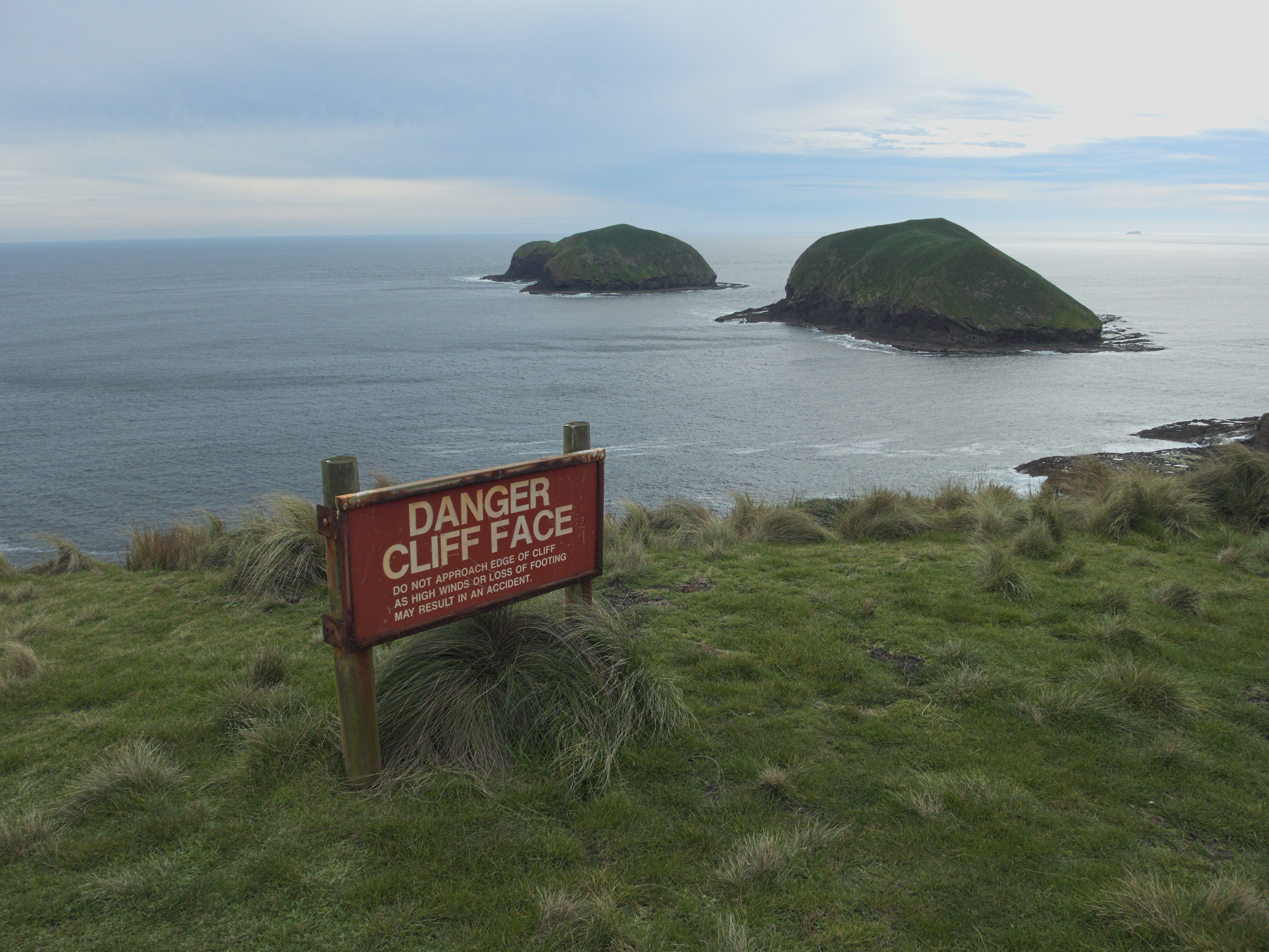
Cliff warning sign at Cape Grim, Tasmania, with The Doughboys in the background

== See also ==
- List of islands of Tasmania
