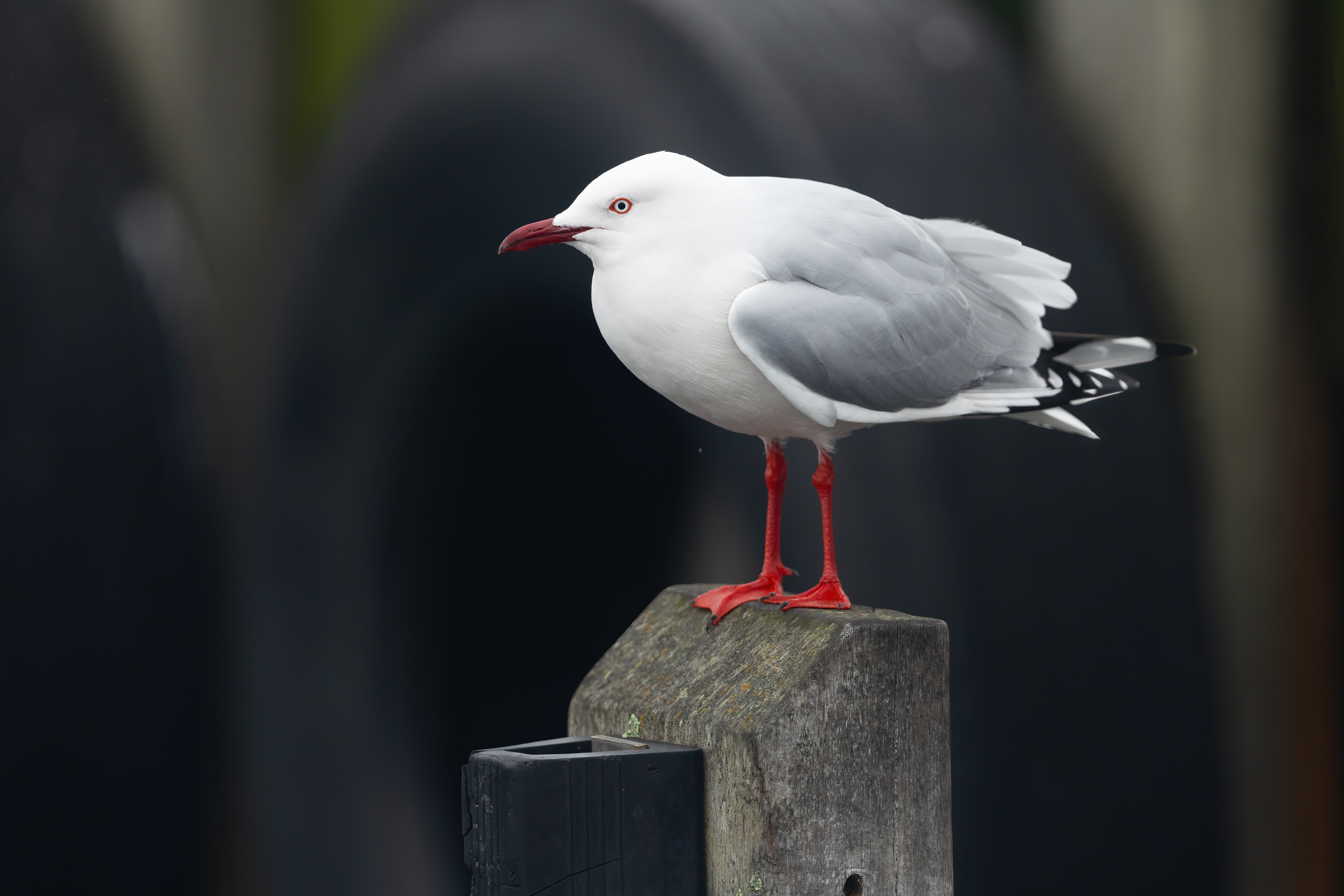
- Adult C. n. novaehollandiae, Tasmania

Conservation status
- Least Concern (IUCN 3.1)

Scientific classification
- Kingdom: Animalia
- Phylum: Chordata
- Class: Aves
- Order: Charadriiformes
- Family: Laridae
- Genus: Chroicocephalus
- Species: C. novaehollandiae

Binomial name
- Chroicocephalus novaehollandiae (Stephens, 1826)

Subspecies
- C. n. forsteri (Mathews, 1912); C. n. novaehollandiae (Stephens, 1826); C. n. scopulinus (Forster, JR, 1844)

= Silver gull =

Species of bird

The silver gull (Chroicocephalus novaehollandiae) is a gull in Oceania. It is the most common gull of Australia. It has been found throughout the continent, but particularly at or near coastal areas. It is smaller than the Pacific gull (Larus pacificus), which also lives in Australia.

The silver gull should not be confused with the herring gull, which is called "silver gull" in many other languages (scientific name Larus argentatus, German Silbermöwe, French Goéland argenté, Dutch zilvermeeuw), but is a much larger, robust gull with no overlap in range.

== Taxonomy ==
It has traditionally been placed in the genus Larus, as is the case with many gulls, but is now placed in the genus Chroicocephalus. Hartlaub's gull (C. hartlaubii) of South Africa was formerly sometimes considered to be subspecies of the silver gull.

There are three subspecies:

- C. n. forsteri (Mathews, 1912) – north and northeast Australia, New Caledonia, Loyalty Islands
- C. n. novaehollandiae (Stephens, 1826) – southern Australia and Tasmania
- C. n. scopulinus (Forster, JR, 1844) or red-billed gull – New Zealand

== Description ==
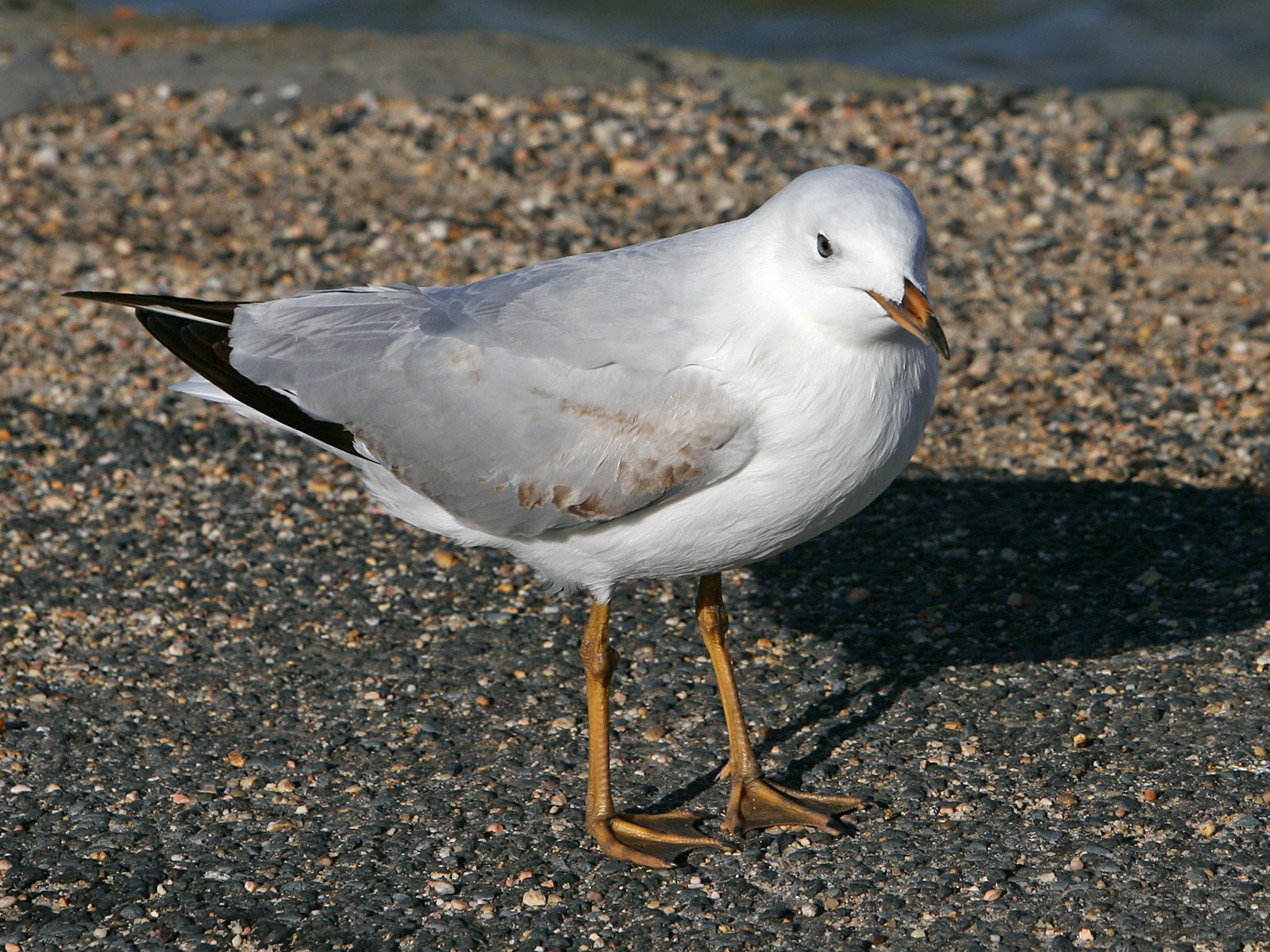
Juvenile (first winter)

=== Adult ===
The head, body, and tail of an adult silver gull are white, and the wings are light grey with white-spotted, black tips. Adults range from 40–45 cm (15.5–17.5 in) in length. Their wingspan ranges from 27 to 31 cm (10.5 to 12 in). Adults have bright red beaks which gets brighter during breeding or when they get older.

=== Juvenile ===
Juveniles have brown patterns on their wings, and a dark beak.

== Distribution and habitat ==
Silver gulls are found in all states of Australia, as well as New Zealand and New Caledonia. It is a common species near human habitations and beaches, having adapted well to urban environments and thriving around shopping centres and rubbish tips. Their successful adaption to urban habitats have seen their population increase in areas of human activity, with the availability of nesting grounds the only limiting factor on population growth.

Silver gulls have twice been recorded in the United States; one bird was shot in August 1947 at the mouth of the Genesee River, Lake Ontario, and another was photographed in Salem County, New Jersey, in autumn 1996. Both are believed to have escaped from captivity.

== Behaviour ==
The silver gull has a sharp voice consisting of a variety of calls. The most common call is a harsh, high pitched 'kwarwh'.

=== Feeding ===
The silver gull naturally feeds on worms, fish, insects and crustaceans. It is a successful scavenger, allowing increased numbers near human settlements. It is known to pester humans for chips and steal unattended food.

=== Breeding ===
Breeding occurs from August to December, typically in large colonies on offshore islands. The nest is located on the ground and consists of seaweed, roots, and plant stems. The nests may be found in low shrubs, rocks and jetties. Typical clutch size is one to three eggs. Often two broods are raised in a year, and both adults share nest-building, incubation and feeding.

== Gallery ==
A silver gull performs its distinctive screaming call.

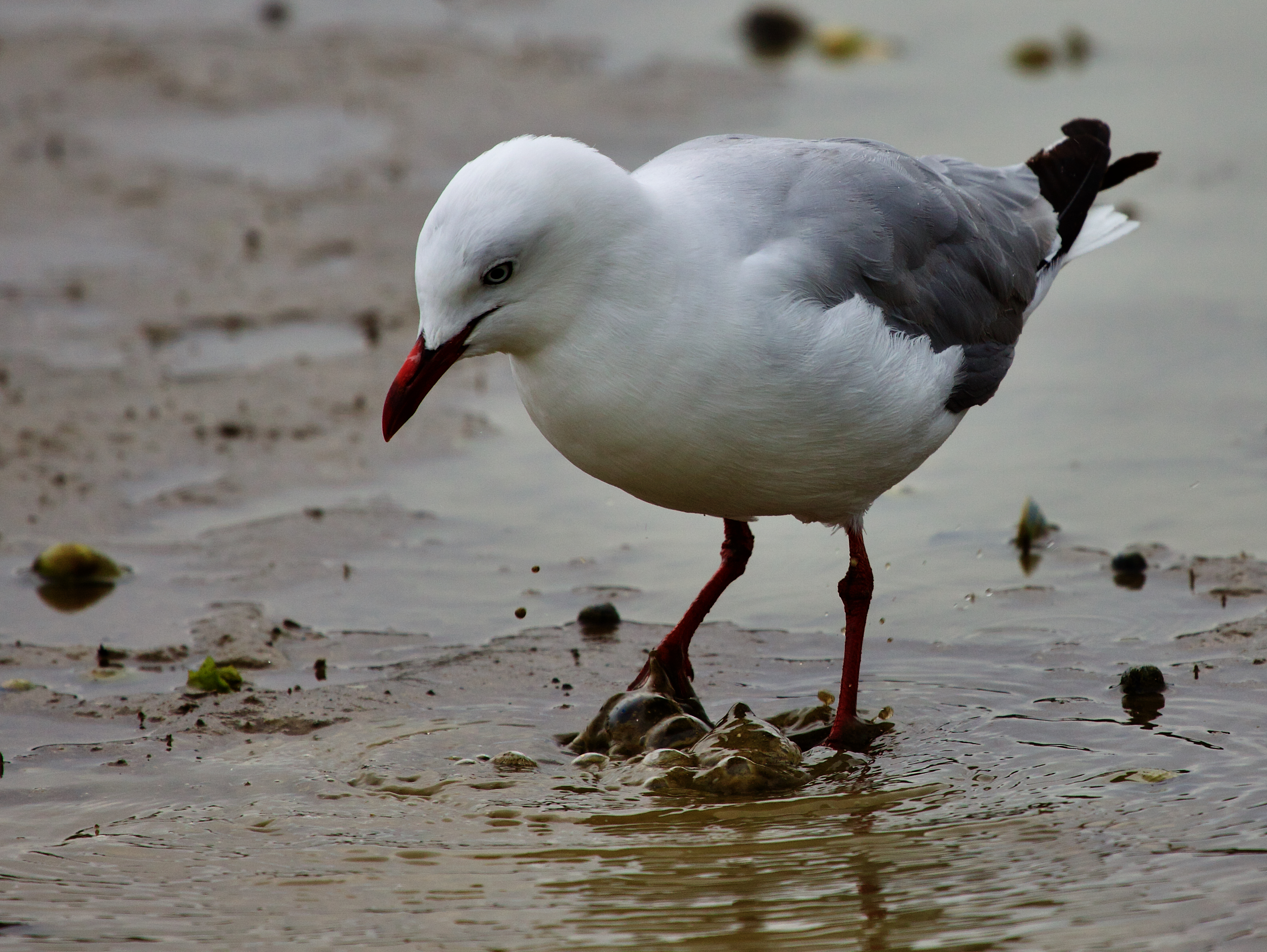
Foraging by oscillating its foot in sand at low tide to uncover prey

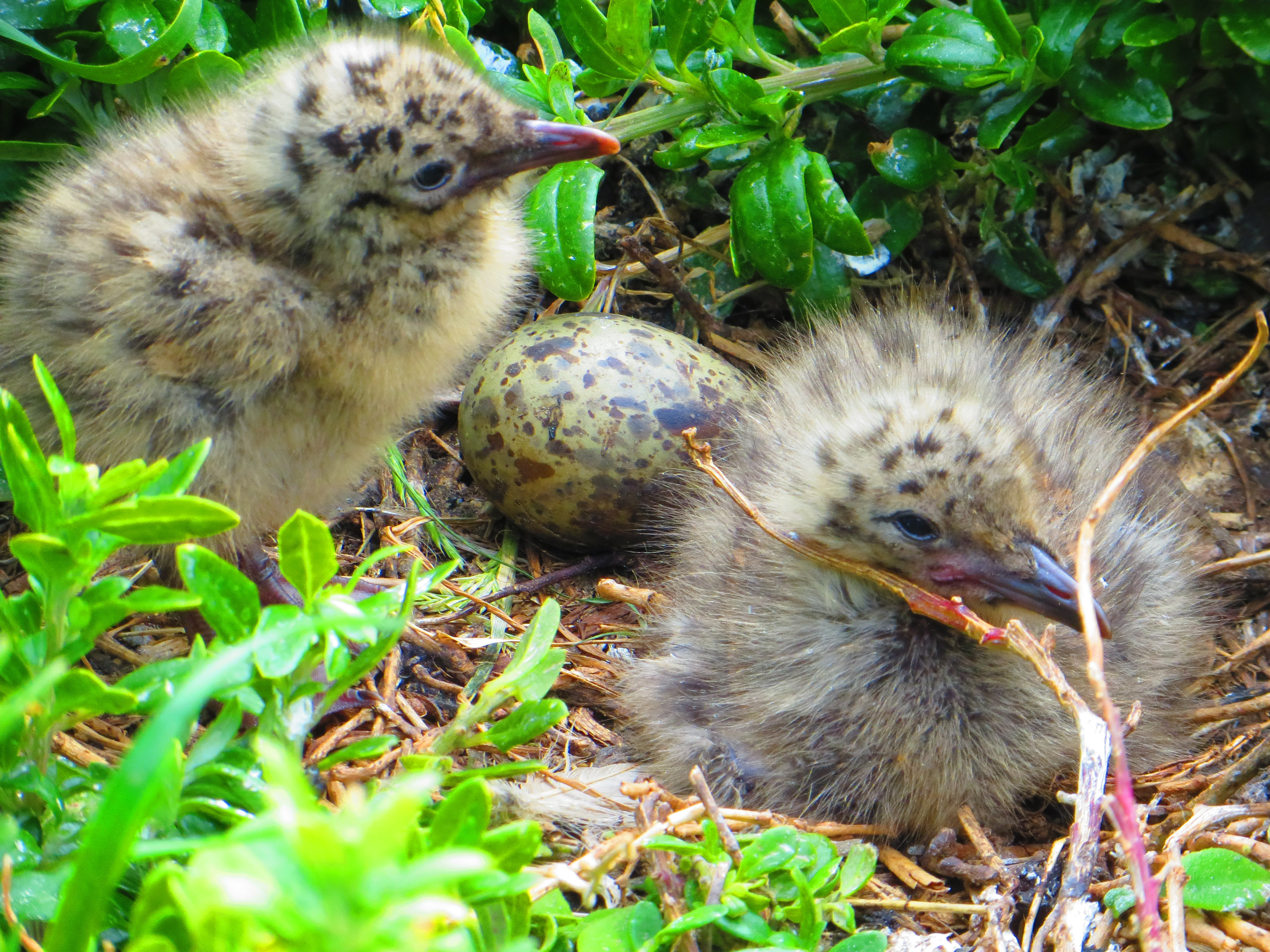
Egg and nestlings in nest at Phillip Island Nature Park, Victoria

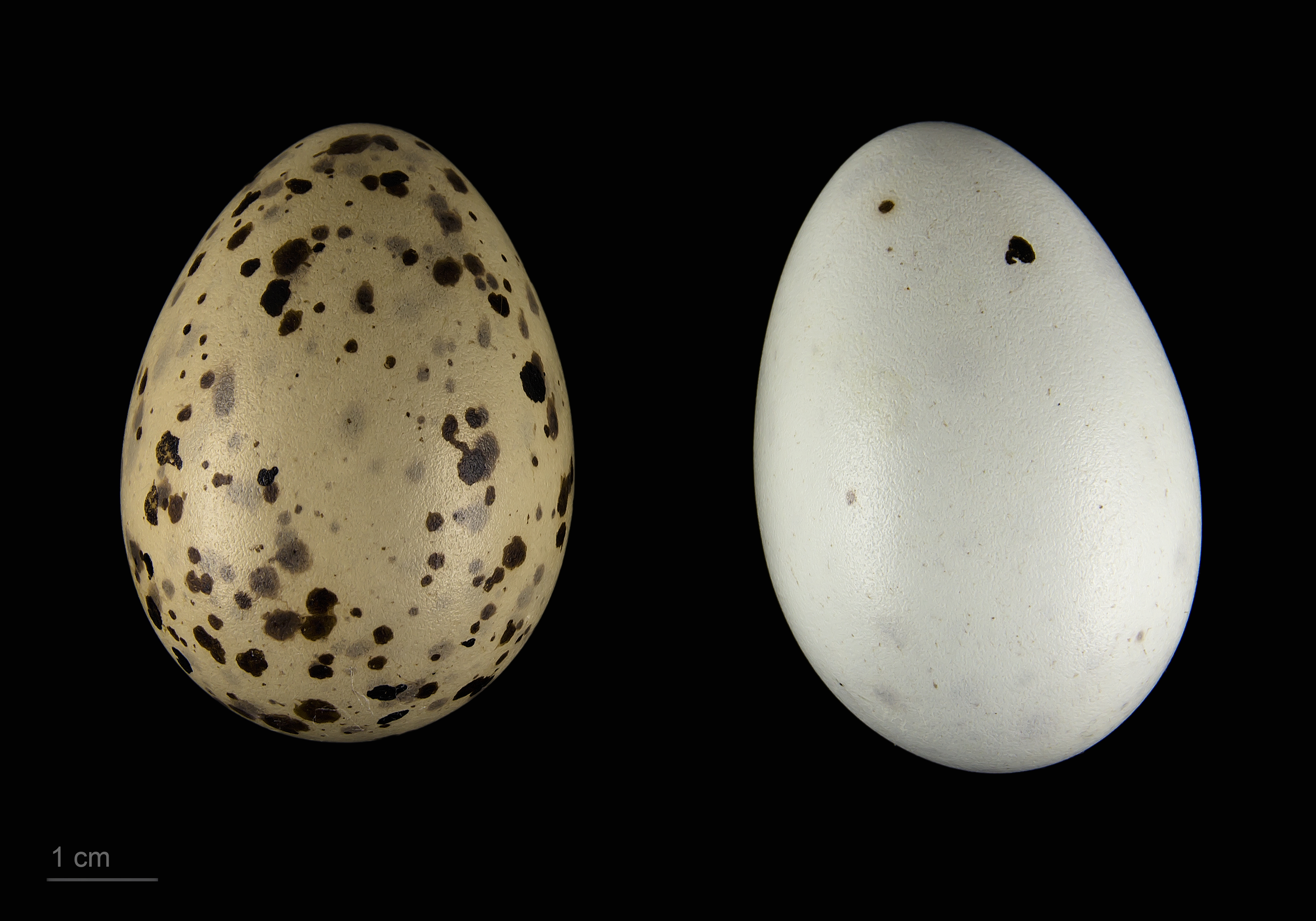
Eggs - MHNT

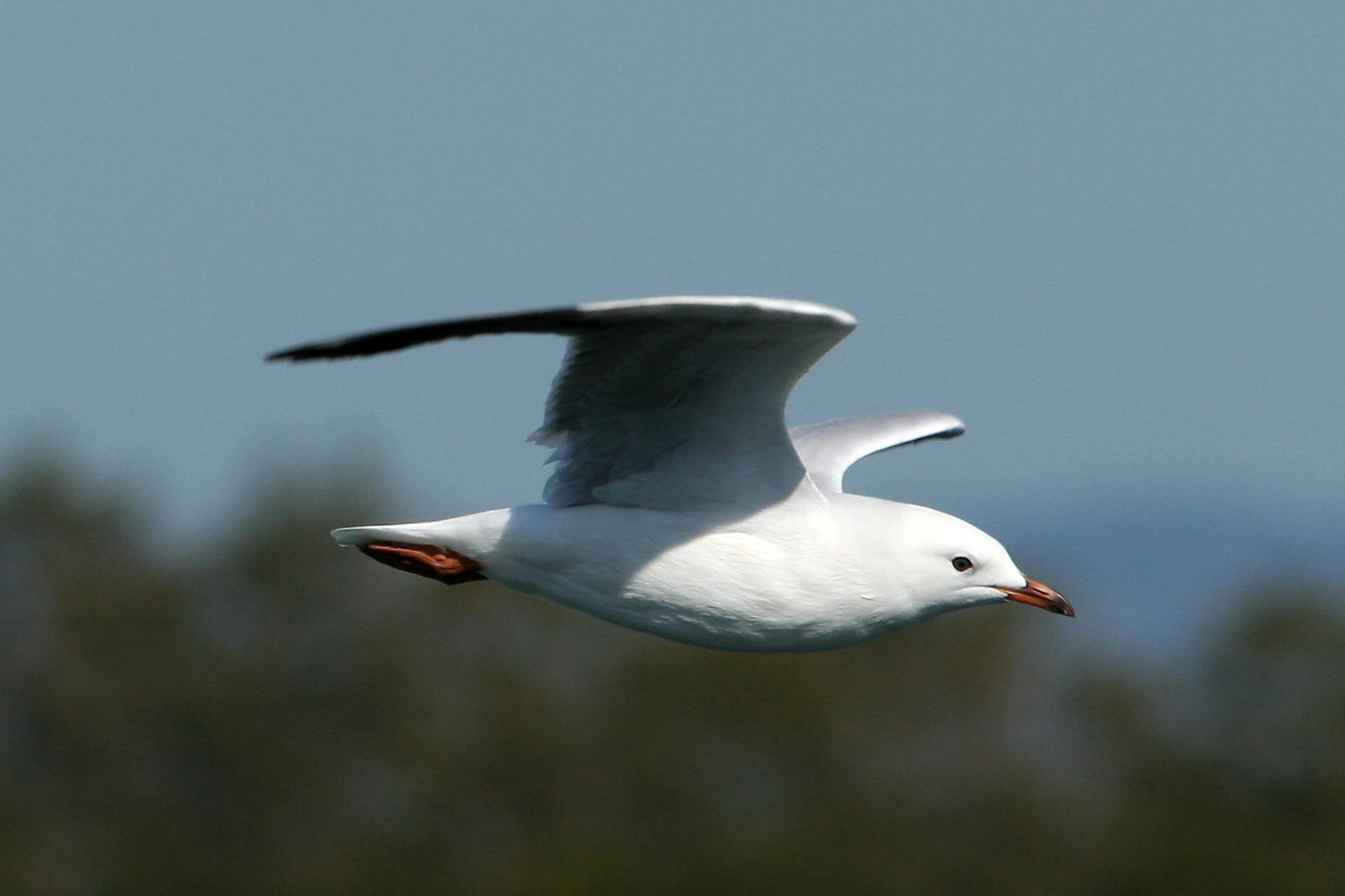
Immature in flight

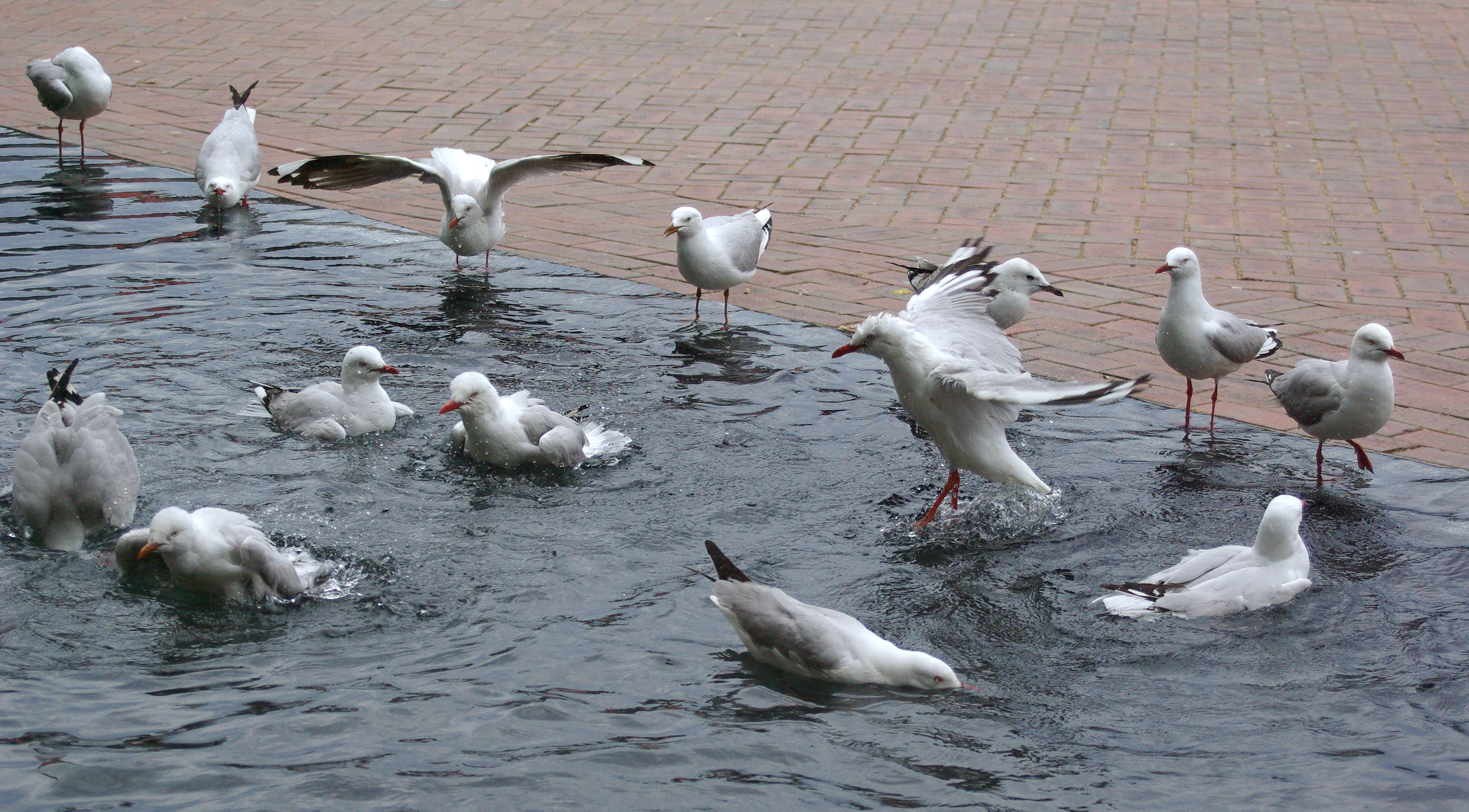
Bathing

In flight, near Gold Coast, Australia

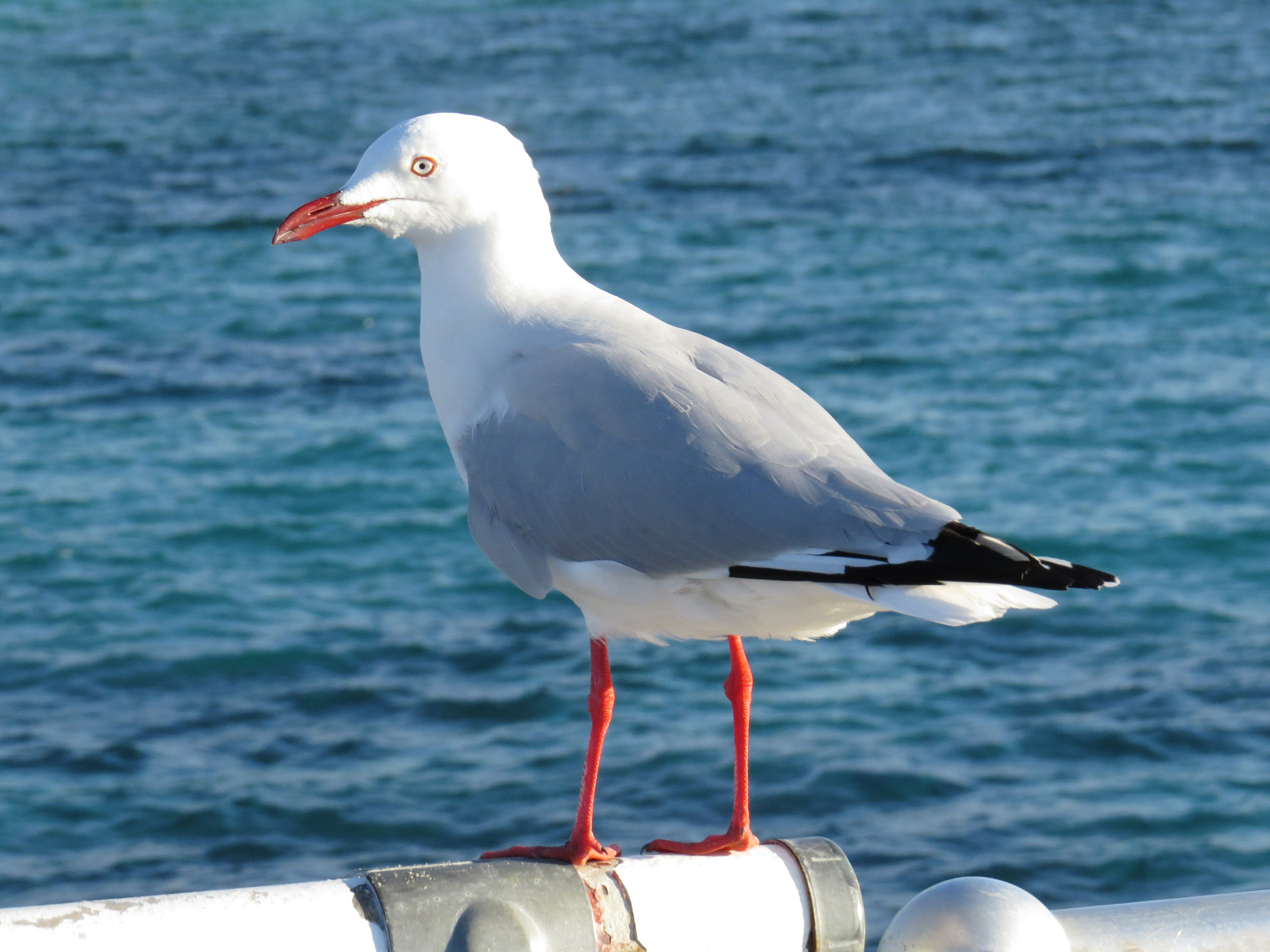
Mature adult on the pier of Green Island east of Cairns

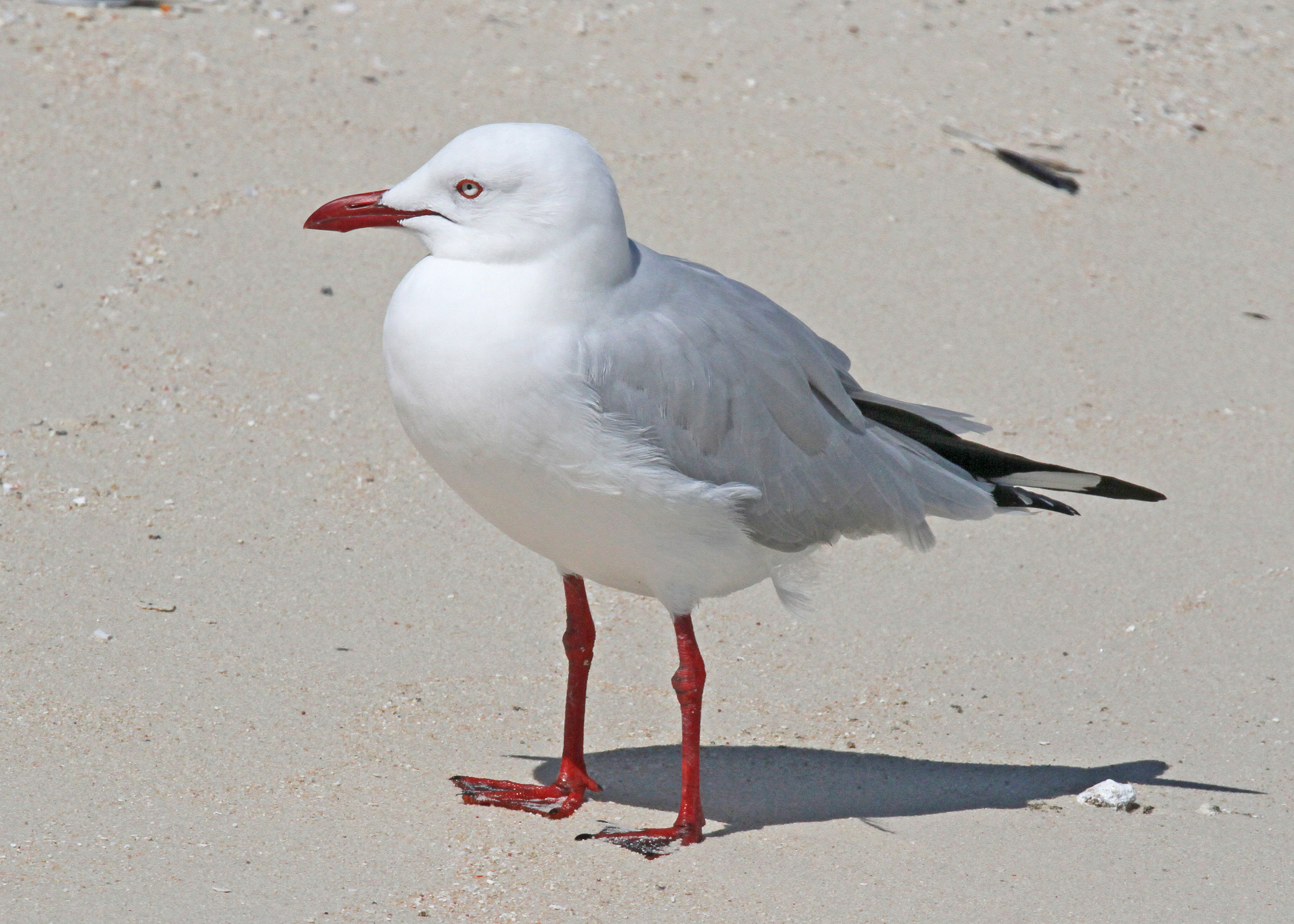
On Michaelmas Cay, Great Barrier Reef, Queensland, Australia
