= Cape Grim =

Point in Tasmania, Australia

Kennaook / Cape Grim
- Cape
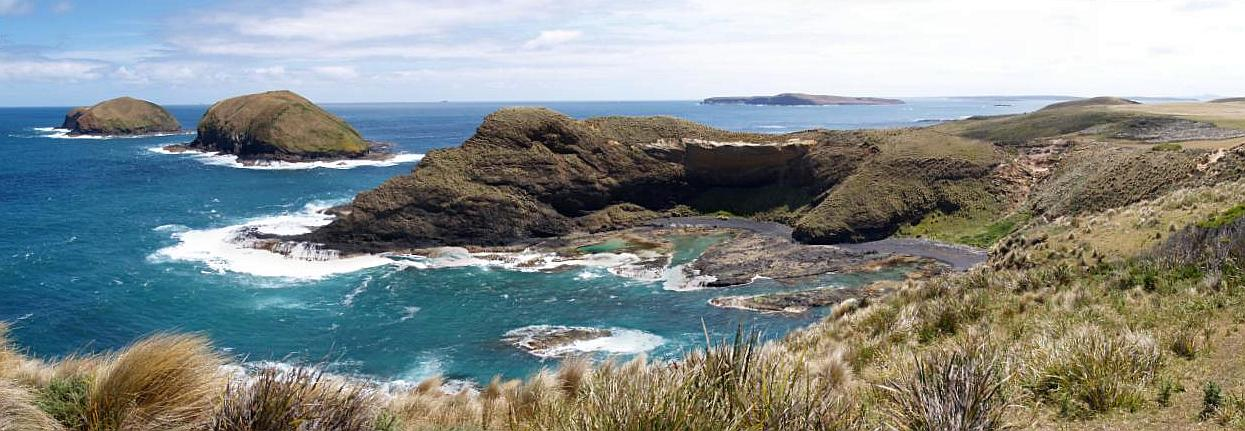
- Cape Grim, looking North. The Doughboys on the left, Trefoil Island in middle distance, Hunter Island and Three Hummock Island beyond to the right.

- Location within Tasmania
- Coordinates: 40°40′25.8″S 144°41′11″ECoordinates
- Location: Tasmania, Australia
- Water bodies: Southern Indian Ocean; Great Australian Bight; Bass Strait

Cape Grim, officially Kennaook / Cape Grim, is the northwestern peninsula of Tasmania, Australia. The Peerapper name for the cape is recorded as Kennaook.

It is the location of the Cape Grim Baseline Air Pollution Station and of the Cape Grim Air Archive which is operated by the Australian Bureau of Meteorology in a joint programme with the CSIRO. The station was established in 1976 and has been operating ever since. The data from Cape Grim have been used extensively in assessments of climate change and ozone depletion.

== Geography ==
Cape Grim's isolated geographic location makes it unique. The next land mass directly west of Cape Grim (on the same parallel) is not Africa, but the southern extremity of provincia of Buenos Aires in Argentina. Winds that make their way to Cape Grim from Antarctica and the Indian Ocean hit no significant land mass. Air pollution values collected at Cape Grim are the closest attainable representation of a global average.

=== Climate ===
Kennaook experiences an oceanic climate bordering on a Warm-summer Mediterranean climate (Köppen: Cfb/Csb) The climate is highly influenced by the cape's position in the Roaring Forties. Hence, all months have recorded a wind gust speed exceeding 125 km/h (78 mph). The wettest recorded day was 2 February 1990 with 109.2 mm (4.30 in) of rainfall. Extreme temperatures ranged from 30.5 °C (86.9 °F) on 29 January 2009 to −0.4 °C (31.3 °F) on 25 July 1986.

The Baseline Air Pollution Station also recorded climate data for temperature, precipitation and 3 pm conditions from 1985 to 2023.

Climate data for Cape Grim BAPS (Comparison) (40.68°S 144.69°E) (94 m (308 ft) AMSL) (1985-2023)
Month	Jan	Feb	Mar	Apr	May	Jun	Jul	Aug	Sep	Oct	Nov	Dec	Year
Record high °C (°F)	30.5 (86.9)	29.0 (84.2)	28.0 (82.4)	25.4 (77.7)	21.0 (69.8)	17.0 (62.6)	16.6 (61.9)	18.3 (64.9)	21.0 (69.8)	21.9 (71.4)	27.2 (81.0)	27.0 (80.6)	30.5 (86.9)
Mean daily maximum °C (°F)	19.2 (66.6)	19.6 (67.3)	18.7 (65.7)	16.6 (61.9)	14.6 (58.3)	13.1 (55.6)	12.6 (54.7)	12.7 (54.9)	13.4 (56.1)	14.5 (58.1)	16.0 (60.8)	17.5 (63.5)	15.7 (60.3)
Mean daily minimum °C (°F)	13.3 (55.9)	13.8 (56.8)	13.0 (55.4)	11.5 (52.7)	10.2 (50.4)	8.9 (48.0)	8.2 (46.8)	8.1 (46.6)	8.6 (47.5)	9.3 (48.7)	10.6 (51.1)	11.9 (53.4)	10.6 (51.1)
Record low °C (°F)	7.0 (44.6)	8.0 (46.4)	4.2 (39.6)	4.9 (40.8)	2.6 (36.7)	0.0 (32.0)	−0.4 (31.3)	1.6 (34.9)	3.0 (37.4)	3.0 (37.4)	4.1 (39.4)	6.6 (43.9)	−0.4 (31.3)
Average precipitation mm (inches)	36.7 (1.44)	34.2 (1.35)	49.2 (1.94)	63.8 (2.51)	84.6 (3.33)	84.6 (3.33)	109.7 (4.32)	102.8 (4.05)	77.7 (3.06)	65.9 (2.59)	53.0 (2.09)	44.1 (1.74)	803.3 (31.63)
Average precipitation days (≥ 0.2 mm)	11.1	10.3	14.4	17.9	21.4	21.5	24.0	24.1	22.0	18.9	14.8	13.4	213.8
Average afternoon relative humidity (%)	69	68	69	72	75	76	75	74	72	70	71	69	72
Average dew point °C (°F)	11.4 (52.5)	12.0 (53.6)	11.1 (52.0)	9.8 (49.6)	8.8 (47.8)	7.6 (45.7)	6.9 (44.4)	6.7 (44.1)	6.8 (44.2)	7.4 (45.3)	9.1 (48.4)	10.0 (50.0)	9.0 (48.1)
Source: Bureau of Meteorology (1985-2023)

A newer weather station opened in 2010. It records climate data for temperature and precipitation.

Climate data for Kennaook (40.68°S 144.69°E) (86 m (282 ft) AMSL) (2010-2025)
Month	Jan	Feb	Mar	Apr	May	Jun	Jul	Aug	Sep	Oct	Nov	Dec	Year
Record high °C (°F)	30.0 (86.0)	27.6 (81.7)	26.3 (79.3)	25.3 (77.5)	20.3 (68.5)	16.9 (62.4)	16.3 (61.3)	17.4 (63.3)	20.7 (69.3)	21.7 (71.1)	23.4 (74.1)	26.3 (79.3)	30.0 (86.0)
Mean daily maximum °C (°F)	19.7 (67.5)	19.7 (67.5)	18.9 (66.0)	16.7 (62.1)	14.5 (58.1)	13.0 (55.4)	12.5 (54.5)	12.6 (54.7)	13.3 (55.9)	14.3 (57.7)	15.7 (60.3)	17.5 (63.5)	15.7 (60.3)
Mean daily minimum °C (°F)	13.8 (56.8)	13.9 (57.0)	13.3 (55.9)	11.7 (53.1)	10.2 (50.4)	8.8 (47.8)	8.4 (47.1)	8.2 (46.8)	8.7 (47.7)	9.3 (48.7)	10.7 (51.3)	12.1 (53.8)	10.8 (51.4)
Record low °C (°F)	8.4 (47.1)	8.5 (47.3)	3.9 (39.0)	5.1 (41.2)	2.4 (36.3)	2.8 (37.0)	2.7 (36.9)	1.5 (34.7)	3.0 (37.4)	3.8 (38.8)	4.6 (40.3)	6.4 (43.5)	1.5 (34.7)
Average precipitation mm (inches)	37.7 (1.48)	33.3 (1.31)	58.5 (2.30)	53.9 (2.12)	93.6 (3.69)	101.0 (3.98)	121.3 (4.78)	120.4 (4.74)	81.3 (3.20)	71.3 (2.81)	61.2 (2.41)	43.4 (1.71)	876.9 (34.52)
Average precipitation days (≥ 0.2 mm)	9.9	9.6	14.9	17.9	22.3	21.4	23.5	24.1	20.8	18.3	16.6	13.6	212.9
Source: Bureau of Meteorology (2010-2025)

== History ==
Western Tasmanian languages were spoken by Tasmanian Aborigines in the area but became extinct during the 19th century.

The headland was first charted and named Cape Grim by Matthew Flinders on 7 December 1798, as he sailed from the east on the Norfolk and found a long swell coming from the south-west, confirming for the first time that Van Diemen's Land was separated from the Australian mainland by a strait, which he named Bass Strait.

In 1828, Victory Hill at Cape Grim was the site of the Cape Grim massacre of thirty Peerapper people by four shepherds.

Cape Grim received dual naming in March 2021.

== See also ==
- Woolnorth Wind Farm
