= List of Dutch explorations =

The following list is composed of (largely) unknown lands that were discovered by people from the Netherlands, or being the first documented Europeans to discover certain areas.

== Explorations ==
=== Orange Islands (1594) ===
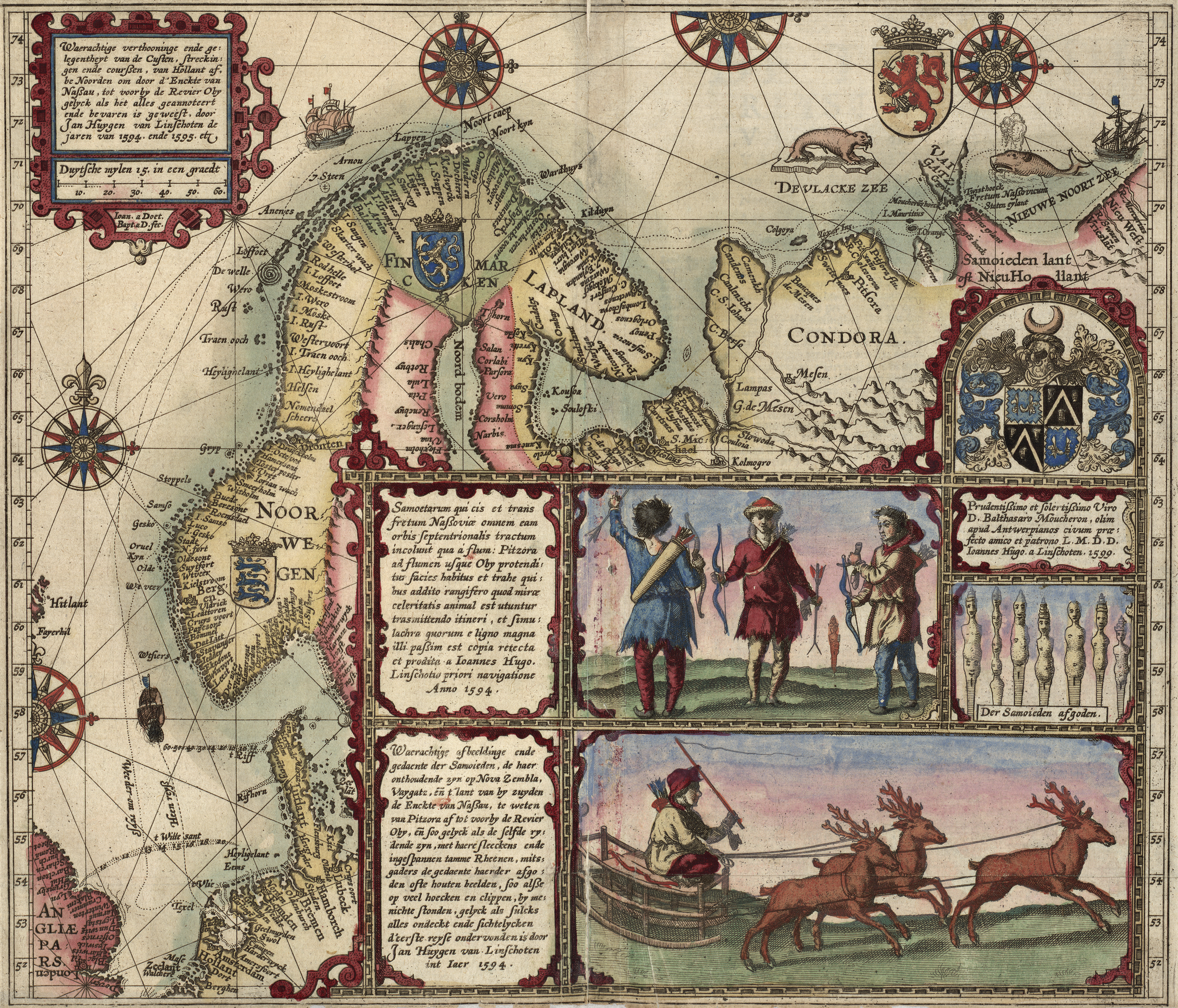
Map of Willem Barentsz' first voyage

During his first journey in 1594, Dutch explorer Willem Barentsz discovered the Orange Islands, at the northern extremity of Nova Zembla.

=== Svalbard (1596) ===
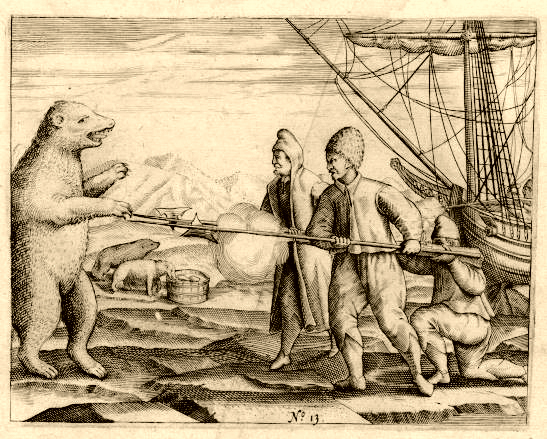
Crew of Willem Barentsz fighting a polar bear

On 10 June 1596, Barentsz and Dutchman Jacob van Heemskerk discovered Bear Island, a week before their discovery of Spitsbergen Island.

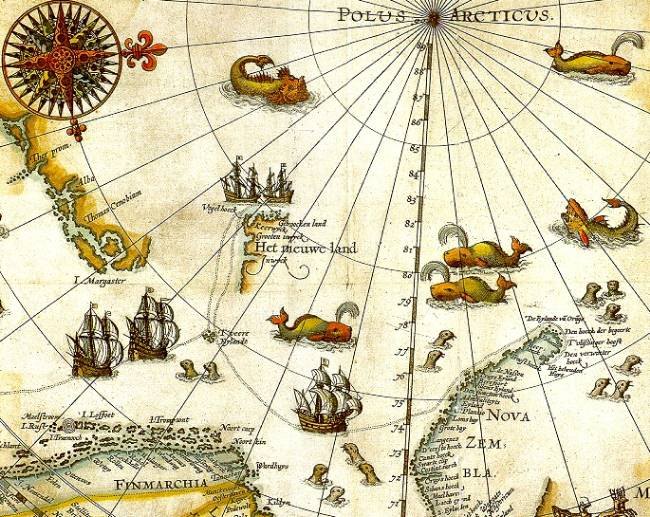
Portion of 1599 map of Arctic exploration by Willem Barentsz. Spitsbergen, here mapped for the first time, is indicated as "Het Nieuwe Land" (Dutch for "the New Land"), center-left.

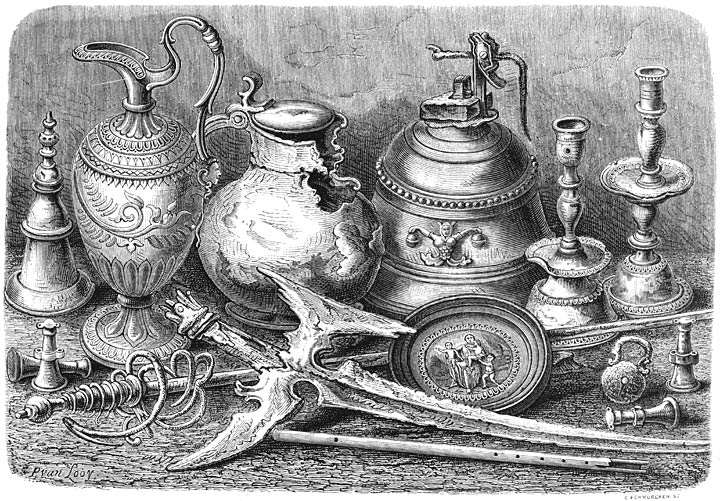
Objects found in Het Behouden Huys (The Saved House) on Novaya Zemlya.

The first undisputed discovery of the archipelago was an expedition led by the Dutch mariner Willem Barentsz, who was looking for the Northern Sea Route to China. He first spotted Bjørnøya on 10 June 1596 and the northwestern tip of Spitsbergen on 17 June. The sighting of the archipelago was included in the accounts and maps made by the expedition and Spitsbergen was quickly included by cartographers. The name Spitsbergen, meaning "pointed mountains" (from the Dutch spits – pointed, bergen – mountains), was at first applied to both the main island and the Svalbard archipelago as a whole.

=== Winter surviving in the High Arctic (1596–1597) ===
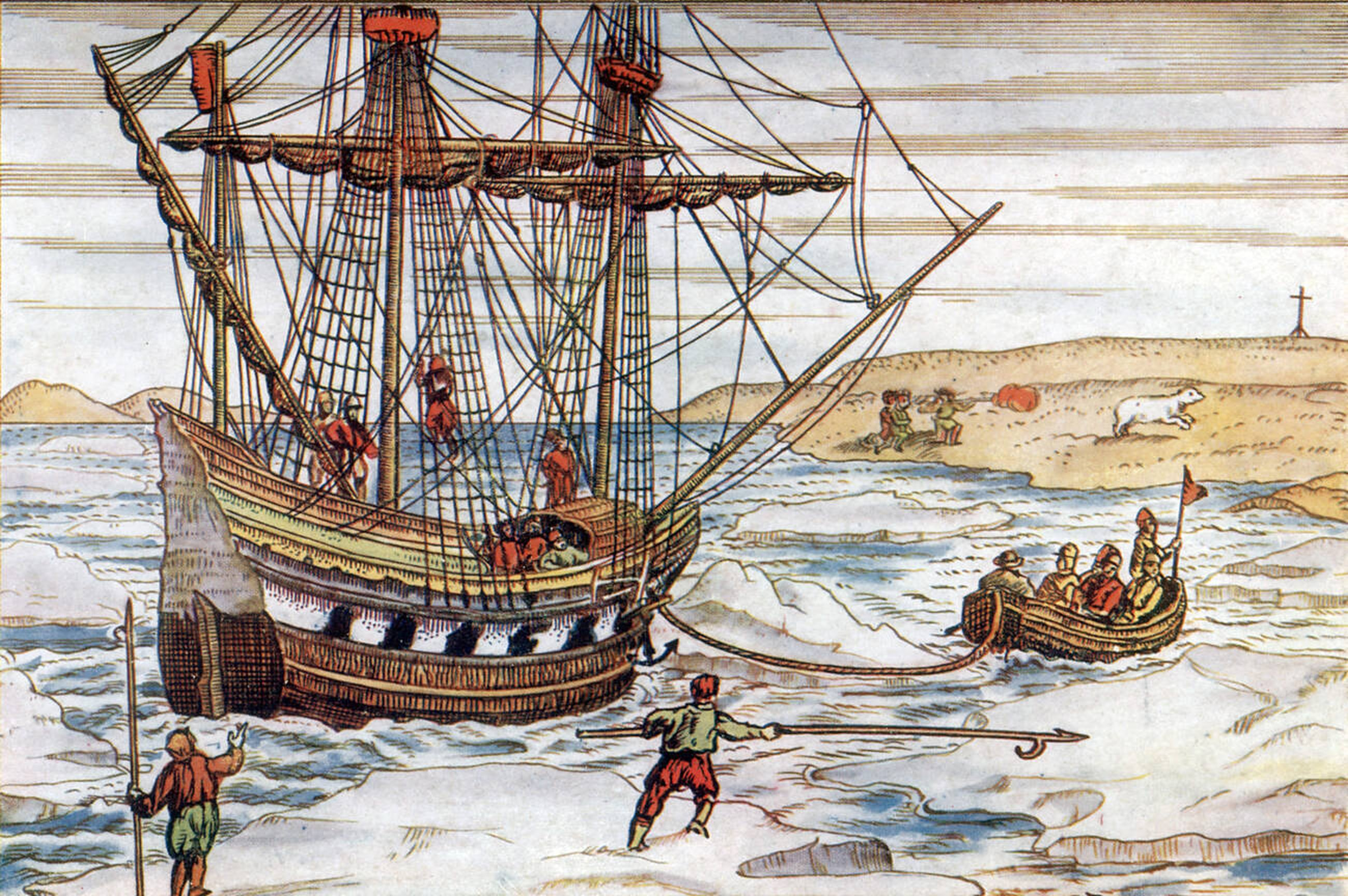
Willem Barentsz' ship among the Arctic ice

The search for the Northern Sea Route in the 16th century led to its exploration. Dutch explorer Willem Barentsz reached the west coast of Novaya Zemlya in 1594, and in a subsequent expedition of 1596 rounded the Northern point and wintered on the Northeast coast. Willem Barentsz, Jacob van Heemskerck and their crew were blocked by the pack ice in the Kara Sea and forced to winter on the east coast of Novaya Zemlya. The wintering of the shipwrecked crew in the 'Saved House' was the first successful wintering of Europeans in the High Arctic. Twelve of the 17 men managed to survive the polar winter (De Veer, 1917). Barentsz died during the expedition, and may have been buried on the northern island.

=== Falkland Islands/Sebald Islands (1600) ===
In 1600 the Dutch navigator Sebald de Weert made the first undisputed sighting of the Falkland Islands. It was on his homeward leg back to the Netherlands after having left the Straits of Magellan that Sebald De Weert noticed some unnamed and uncharted islands, at least islands that did not exist on his nautical charts. There he attempted to stop and replenish but was unable to land due to harsh conditions. The islands Sebald de Weert charted were a small group off the northwest coast of the Falkland Islands and are in fact part of the Falklands. De Weert then named these islands the "Sebald de Weert Islands" and the Falklands as a whole were known as the Sebald Islands until well into the 18th century.

=== Pennefather River, Northern Australia (1606) ===
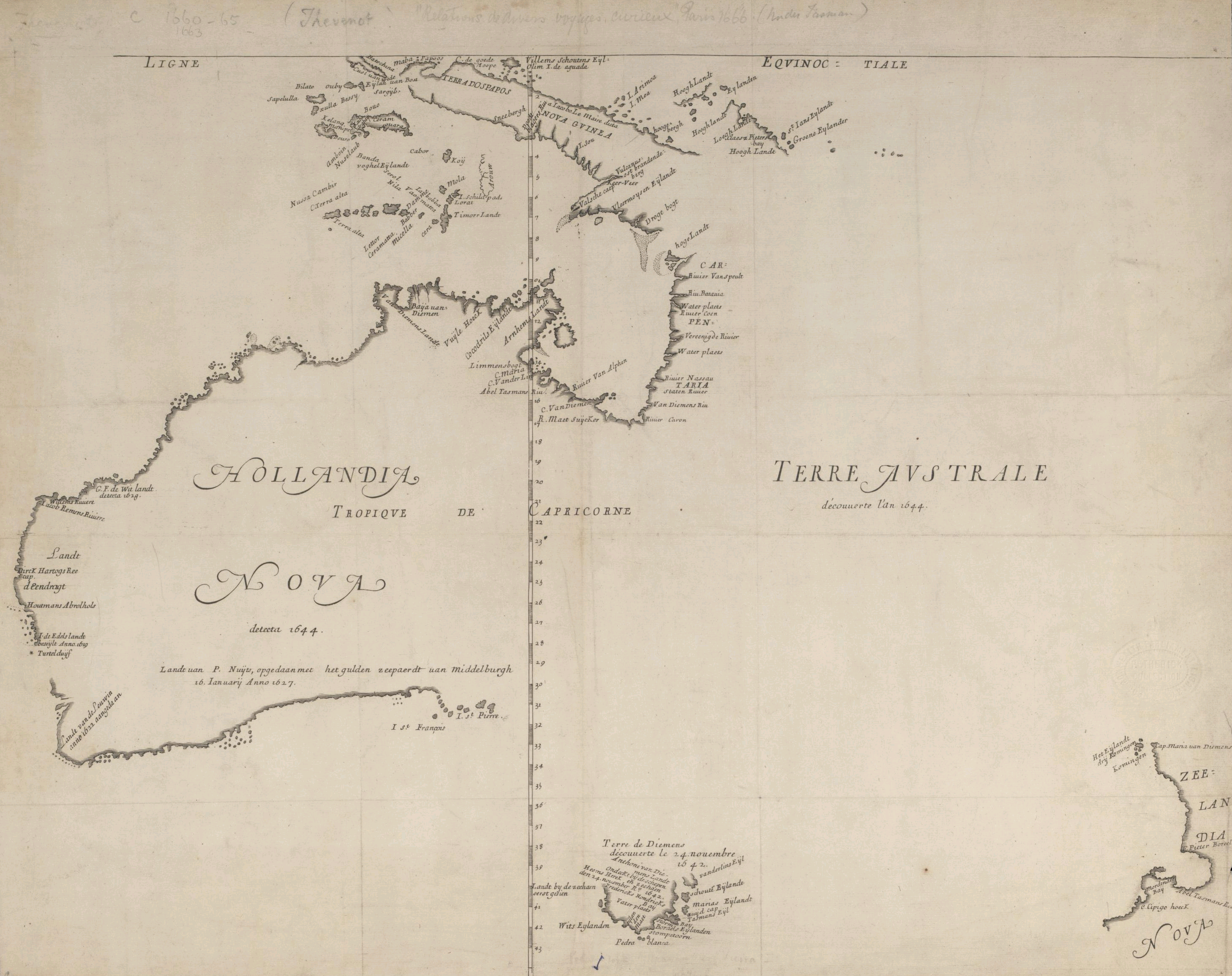
Hollandia Nova, 1659 map prepared by Joan Blaeu based on voyages by Abel Tasman and Willem Jansz, this image shows a French edition of 1663.

The Dutch ship, Duyfken, led by Willem Janszoon, made the first documented European landing in Australia in 1606. Although a theory of Portuguese discovery in the 1520s exists, it lacks definitive evidence. Precedence of discovery has also been claimed for China, France, Spain, India, and even Phoenicia.

The Janszoon voyage of 1605–06 led to the first undisputed sighting of Australia by a European was made on 26 February 1606. Dutch vessel Duyfken, captained by Janszoon, followed the coast of New Guinea, missed Torres Strait, and explored perhaps 350 kilometres (220 mi) of western side of Cape York, in the Gulf of Carpentaria, believing the land was still part of New Guinea. The Dutch made one landing, but were promptly attacked by Aboriginals and subsequently abandoned further exploration.

The first recorded European sighting of the Australian mainland, and the first recorded European landfall on the Australian continent, are attributed to the Dutch navigator Willem Janszoon. He sighted the coast of Cape York Peninsula in early 1606, and made landfall on 26 February at the Pennefather River near the modern town of Weipa on Cape York. The Dutch charted the whole of the western and northern coastlines and named the island continent "New Holland" during the 17th century, but made no attempt at settlement.

=== First charting of Manhattan, New York (1609) ===
The area that is now Manhattan was long inhabited by the Lenape Indians. In 1524, Florentine explorer Giovanni da Verrazzano – sailing in service of the king Francis I of France – was the first European to visit the area that would become New York City. It was not until the voyage of Henry Hudson, an Englishman who worked for the Dutch East India Company, that the area was mapped.

=== Hudson Valley (1609) ===
At the time of the arrival of the first Europeans in the 17th century, the Hudson Valley was inhabited primarily by the Algonquian-speaking Mahican and Munsee Native American people, known collectively as River Indians. The first Dutch settlement was in the 1610s at Fort Nassau, a trading post (factorij) south of modern-day Albany, that traded European goods for beaver pelts. Fort Nassau was later replaced by Fort Orange. During the rest of the 17th century, the Hudson Valley formed the heart of the New Netherland colony operations, with the New Amsterdam settlement on Manhattan serving as a post for supplies and defense of the upriver operations.

=== Brouwer Route (1610–1611) ===
The Brouwer Route was a route for sailing from the Cape of Good Hope to Java. The Route took ships south from the Cape into the Roaring Forties, then east across the Indian Ocean, before turning northwest for Java. Thus it took advantage of the strong westerly winds for which the Roaring Forties are named, greatly increasing travel speed. It was devised by Dutch sea explorer Hendrik Brouwer in 1611, and found to halve the duration of the journey from Europe to Java, compared to the previous Arab and Portuguese monsoon route, which involved following the coast of East Africa northwards, sailing through the Mozambique Channel and then across the Indian Ocean, sometimes via India. The Brouwer Route played a major role in the discovery of the west coast of Australia.

=== Jan Mayen Island (1614) ===
After unconfirmed reports of Dutch discovery as early as 1611, the island was named after Dutchman Jan Jacobszoon May van Schellinkhout, who visited the island in July 1614. As locations of these islands were kept secret by the whalers, Jan Mayen got its current name only in 1620.

=== Hell Gate, Long Island Sound, Connecticut River and Fisher's Island (1614) ===
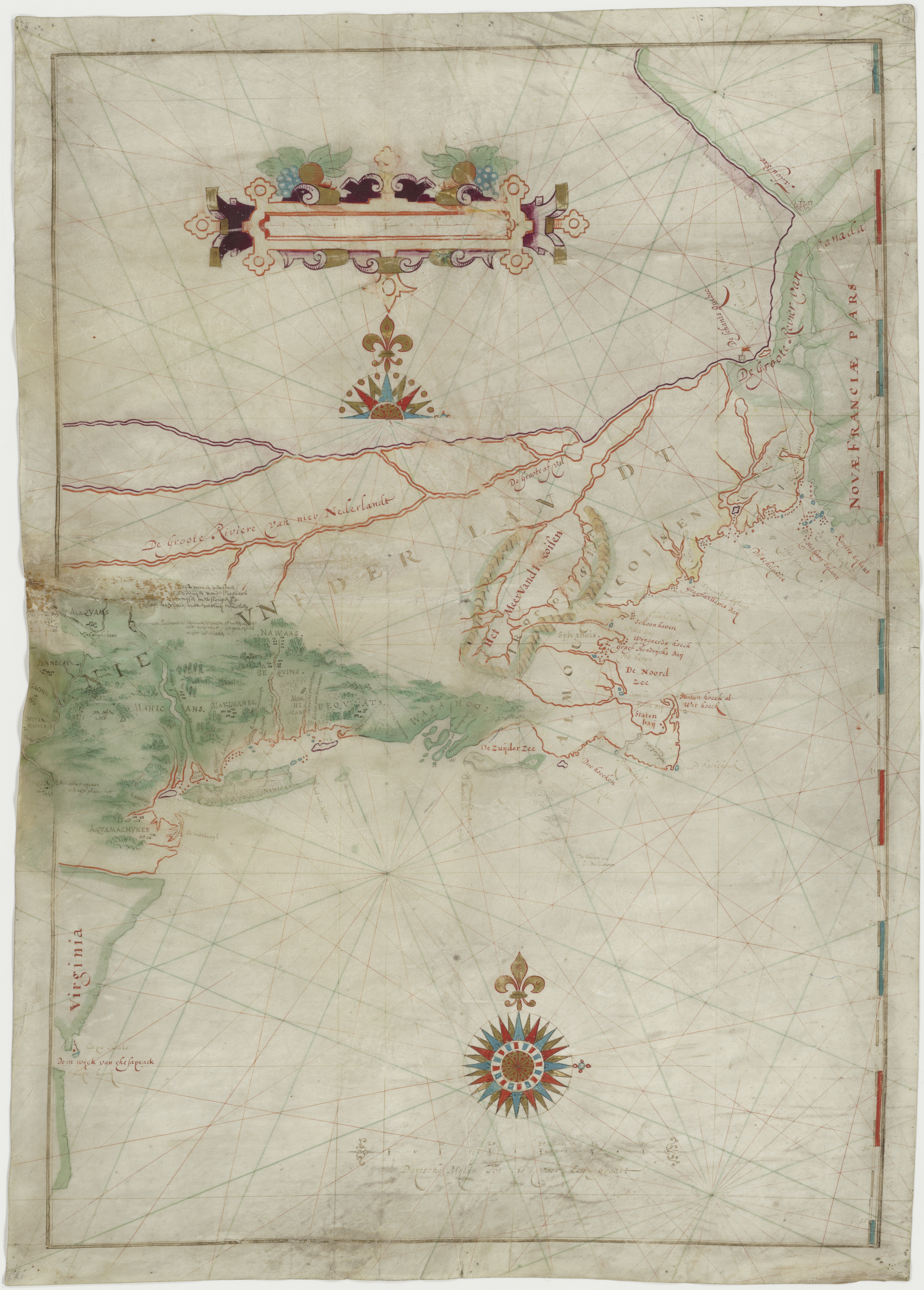
Block's map of his 1614 voyage, with the first appearance of the term "New Netherland"

The name "Hell Gate" is a corruption of Dutch phrase Hellegat, which could mean either "hell's hole" or "bright gate/passage". It was originally applied to the entirety of the East River. The strait was described in the journals of Dutch explorer Adriaen Block, who is the first European known to have navigated the strait, during his 1614 voyage aboard the Onrust.

The first European to record the existence of Long Island Sound and the Connecticut River was Dutch explorer Adriaen Block, who entered it from the East River in 1614.

Fishers Island was called Munnawtawkit by the Native American Pequot nation. Block named it Visher's Island in 1614, after one of his companions. For the next 25 years, it remained a wilderness, visited occasionally by Dutch traders.

=== Staten Island (Argentina), Cape Horn, Tonga, Hoorn Islands (1615) ===
On 25 December 1615, Dutch explorers Jacob le Maire and Willem Schouten aboard the Eendracht, discovered Staten Island, close to Cape Horn.

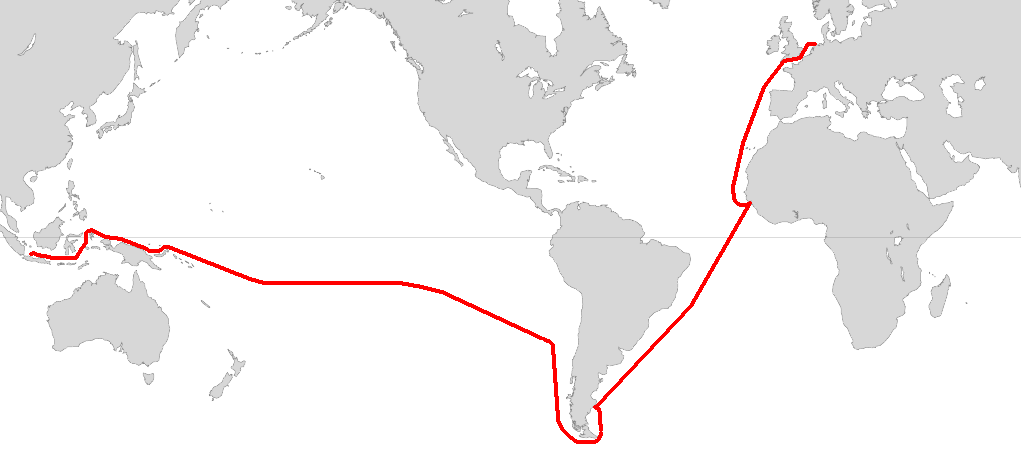
The voyage of Willem Schouten and Jacob le Maire in 1615–1616

On 29 January 1616, they sighted land they called Cape Horn, after the city of Hoorn. Aboard the Eendracht was the crew of the recently wrecked ship called Hoorn.

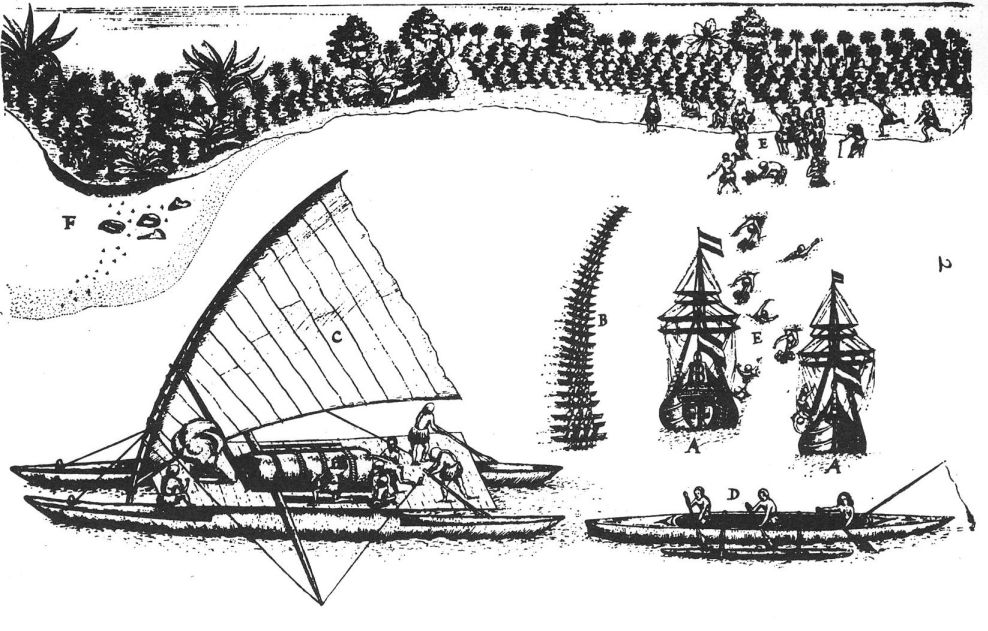
Arrival of Abel Tasman in Tongatapu, 1643, drawing by Isaack Gilsemans

They discovered Tonga on 21 April 1616 and the Hoorn Islands on 28 April 1616.

They discovered New Ireland around May–July 1616.

They discovered the Schouten Islands (also known as Biak Islands or Geelvink Islands) on 24 July 1616.

The Schouten Islands (also known as Eastern Schouten Islands or Le Maire Islands) of Papua New Guinea, were named after Schouten, who visited them in 1616.

=== Dirk Hartog Island (1616) ===
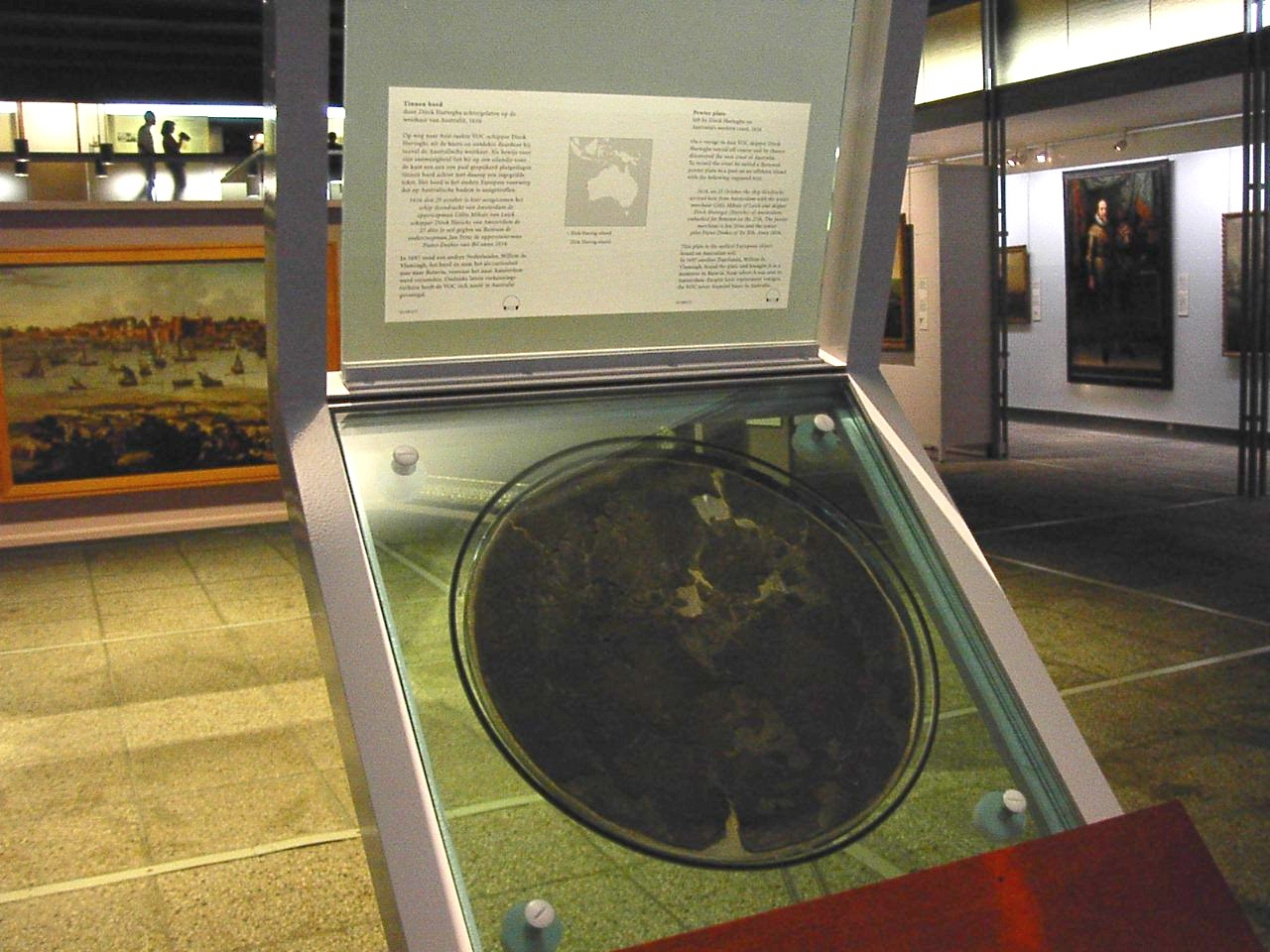
Dirk Hartog's plate in the Rijksmuseum Amsterdam

Map of Shark Bay area showing Dirk Hartog Island and Cape Inscription

Hendrik Brouwer's discovery that sailing east from the Cape of Good Hope until land was sighted, and then sailing north along the west coast of Australia was a much quicker route than around the coast of the Indian Ocean made Dutch landfalls on the west coast inevitable. The first such landfall was in 1616, when Dirk Hartog landed at Cape Inscription on what is now known as Dirk Hartog Island, off the coast of Western Australia, and left behind an inscription on a pewter plate. In 1697 the Dutch captain Willem de Vlamingh landed on the island and discovered Hartog's plate. He replaced it with one of his own, which included a copy of Hartog's inscription, and took the original plate home to Amsterdam, where it is still kept in the Rijksmuseum Amsterdam.

=== Houtman Abrolhos (1619) ===
The first sighting of the Houtman Abrolhos by Europeans was by Dutch VOC ships Dordrecht and Amsterdam in 1619, three years after Hartog made the first authenticated sighting of what is now Western Australia, 13 years after the first authenticated voyage to Australia, that of the Duyfke in 1606. Discovery of the islands was credited to Frederick de Houtman, Captain-General of the Dordrecht, as it was Houtman who later wrote of the discovery in a letter to Company directors.

=== Carstensz Glacier, Carstensz Pyramid/Puncak Jaya (1623) ===
The first person to spot Carstensz Pyramid (or Puncak Jaya) is reported to be the Dutch navigator and explorer Jan Carstensz in 1623, for whom the mountain is named. Carstensz was the first non-native to sight the glaciers on the peak of the mountain on a rare clear day. The sighting went unverified for over two centuries, and Carstensz was ridiculed in Europe when he said he had seen snow and glaciers near the equator. The snowfield of Puncak Jaya was reached as early as 1909 by a Dutch explorer, Hendrik Albert Lorentz with six of his indigenous Dayak Kenyah porters recruited from the Apo Kayan in Borneo. The now highest Carstensz Pyramid summit was not climbed until 1962, by an expedition led by the Austrian mountaineer Heinrich Harrer with three other expedition members – the New Zealand mountaineer Philip Temple, the Australian rock climber Russell Kippax, and the Dutch patrol officer Albertus (Bert) Huizenga.

=== Gulf of Carpentaria (Northern Australia) (1623) ===
The first known European explorer to visit the region was Dutch Willem Janszoon (also known as Willem Jansz) on his 1605–06 voyage. His fellow countryman, Jan Carstenszoon (also known as Jan Carstensz), visited in 1623 and named the gulf in honour of Pieter de Carpentier, at that time the governor-general of Dutch East Indies. Abel Tasman explored the coast in 1644.

=== Staaten River (Cape York Peninsula, Northern Australia) (1623) ===
The Staaten River is a river in the Cape York Peninsula, Australia that rises more than 200 kilometres (120 mi) to the west of Cairns and empties into the Gulf of Carpentaria. The river was first named by Carstenszoon in 1623.

=== Arnhem Land and Groote Eylandt (Gulf of Carpentaria, Northern Australia) (1623) ===
In 1623 Dutch East India Company captain Willem van Colster sailed into the Gulf of Carpentaria. Cape Arnhem is named after his ship, the Arnhem, which itself was named after the city of Arnhem.

Groote Eylandt was first sighted the Arnhem. Only in 1644, when Abel Tasman arrived, was the island given a European name, Dutch for "Great Island" in an archaic spelling. The modern Dutch spelling is Groot Eiland.

=== Hermite Islands (1624) ===
In February 1624, Dutch admiral Jacques l'Hermite discovered the Hermite Islands at Cape Horn.

=== Southern Australia coast (1627) ===
In 1627, Dutch explorers François Thijssen and Pieter Nuyts discovered the south coast of Australia and charted about 1,800 kilometres (1,100 mi) of it between Cape Leeuwin and the Nuyts Archipelago. François Thijssen, captain of the ship 't Gulden Zeepaert (The Golden Seahorse), sailed to the east as far as Ceduna in South Australia. The first known ship to have visited the area is the Leeuwin ("Lioness"), a Dutch vessel that charted some of the nearby coastline in 1622. The log of the Leeuwin has been lost, so very little is known of the voyage. However, the land discovered by the Leeuwin was recorded on a 1627 map by Hessel Gerritsz: Caert van't Landt van d'Eendracht ("Chart of the Land of Eendracht"), which appears to show the coast between present-day Hamelin Bay and Point D’Entrecasteaux. Part of Thijssen's map shows the islands St Francis and St Peter, now known collectively with their respective groups as the Nuyts Archipelago. Thijssen's observations were included as soon as 1628 by the VOC cartographer Hessel Gerritsz in a chart of the Indies and New Holland. This voyage defined most of the southern coast of Australia and discouraged the notion that "New Holland", as it was then known, was linked to Antarctica.

St Francis Island (originally in Dutch: Eyland St. François) is an island on the south coast of South Australia near Ceduna. It is now part of the Nuyts Archipelago Wilderness Protection Area. It was one of the first parts of South Australia to be discovered and named by Europeans, along with St Peter Island. Thijssen named it after his patron saint, St. Francis.

St Peter Island is an island on the south coast of South Australia near Ceduna to the south of Denial Bay. It is the second largest island in South Australia at about 13 km long. It was named in 1627 by Thijssen after Pieter Nuyts' patron saint.

=== Western Australia (1629) ===
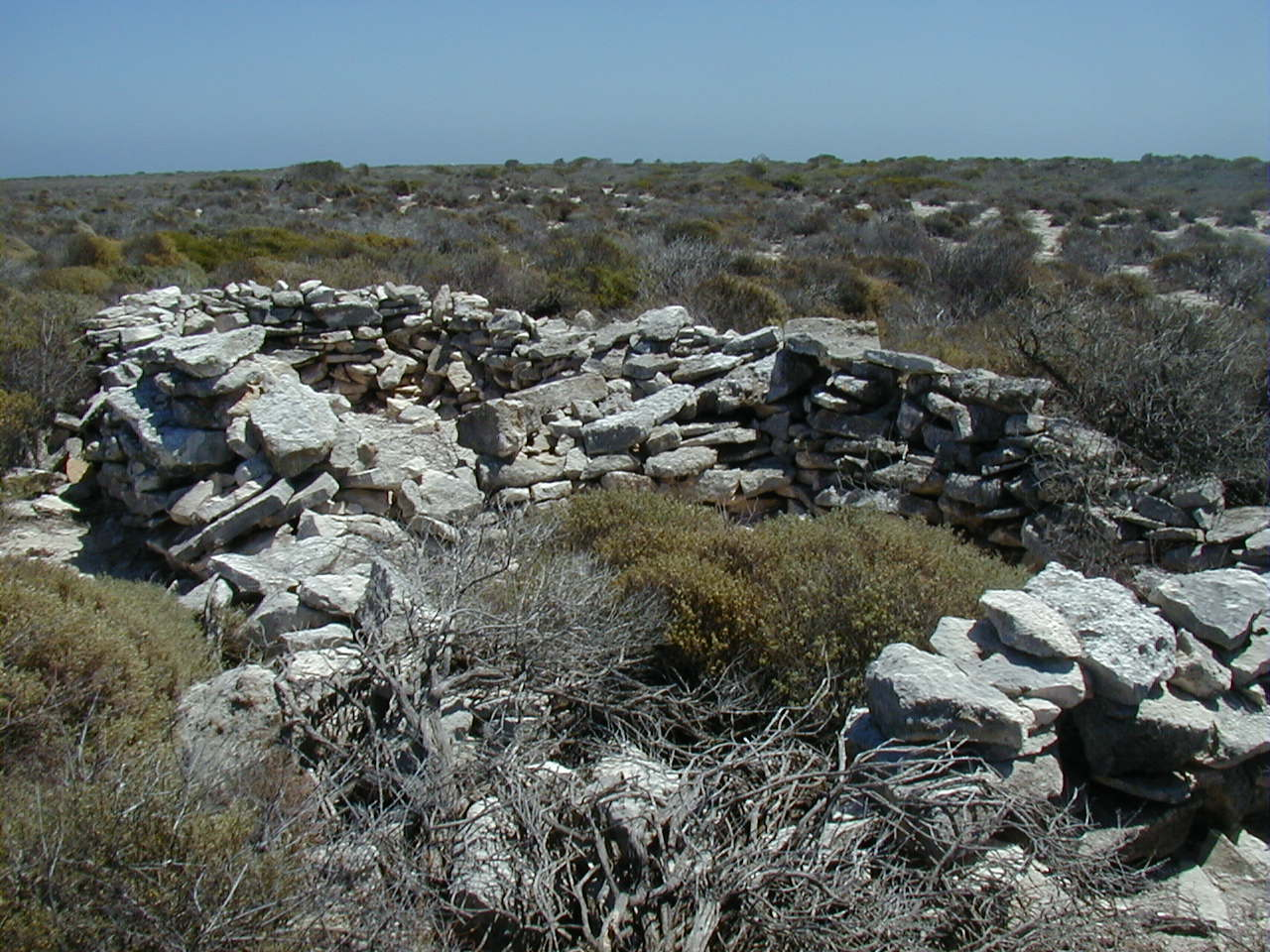
Wiebbe Hayes Stone Fort on the West Wallabi Island

The Weibbe Hayes Stone Fort, remnants of improvised defensive walls and stone shelters built by Wiebbe Hayes and his men on the West Wallabi Island, are Australia's oldest known European structures, more than 150 years before expeditions to the Australian continent by James Cook and Arthur Phillip.

=== Tasmania and the surrounding islands (1642) ===
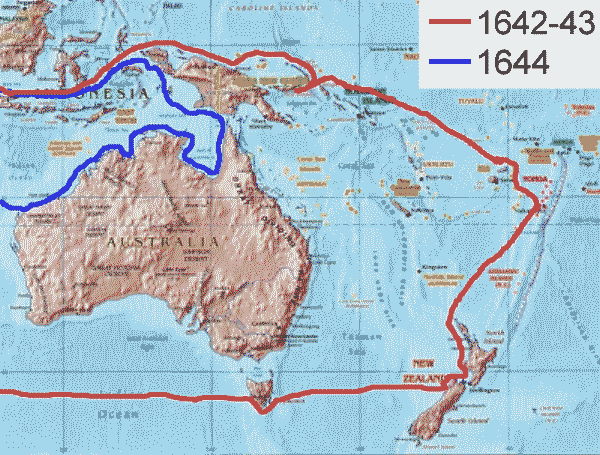
Tasman's routes of the first and second voyage

In 1642, Abel Tasman sailed from Mauritius and on 24 November, sighted Tasmania. He named Tasmania Van Diemen's Land, after Anthony van Diemen, the Dutch East India Company's governor-general, who had commissioned his voyage. It was officially renamed Tasmania in honour of its first European discoverer on 1 January 1856.

Maatsuyker Islands, a group of small islands that are the southernmost point of the Australian continent. were discovered and named by Tasman in 1642 after a Dutch official. The main islands of the group are De Witt Island (354 m), Maatsuyker Island (296 m), Flat Witch Island, Flat Top Island, Round Top Island, Walker Island, Needle Rocks and Mewstone.

Maria Island was discovered and named in 1642 by Tasman after Maria van Diemen (née van Aelst), wife of Anthony. The island was known as Maria's Isle in the early 19th century.

Tasman's journal entry for 29 November 1642 records that he observed a rock which was similar to a rock named Pedra Branca off China, presumably referring to the Pedra Branca in the South China Sea.

Schouten Island is a 28 square kilometres (11 sq mi) island in eastern Tasmania, Australia. It lies 1.6 kilometres south of Freycinet Peninsula and is a part of Freycinet National Park. In 1642, while surveying the south-west coast of Tasmania, Tasman named the island after Joost Schouten, a member of the Council of the Dutch East India Company.

Tasman also reached Storm Bay, a large bay in the south-east of Tasmania, Australia. It is the entrance to the Derwent River estuary and the port of Hobart, the capital city of Tasmania. It is bordered by Bruny Island to the west and the Tasman Peninsula to the east.

=== New Zealand and Fiji (1642) ===
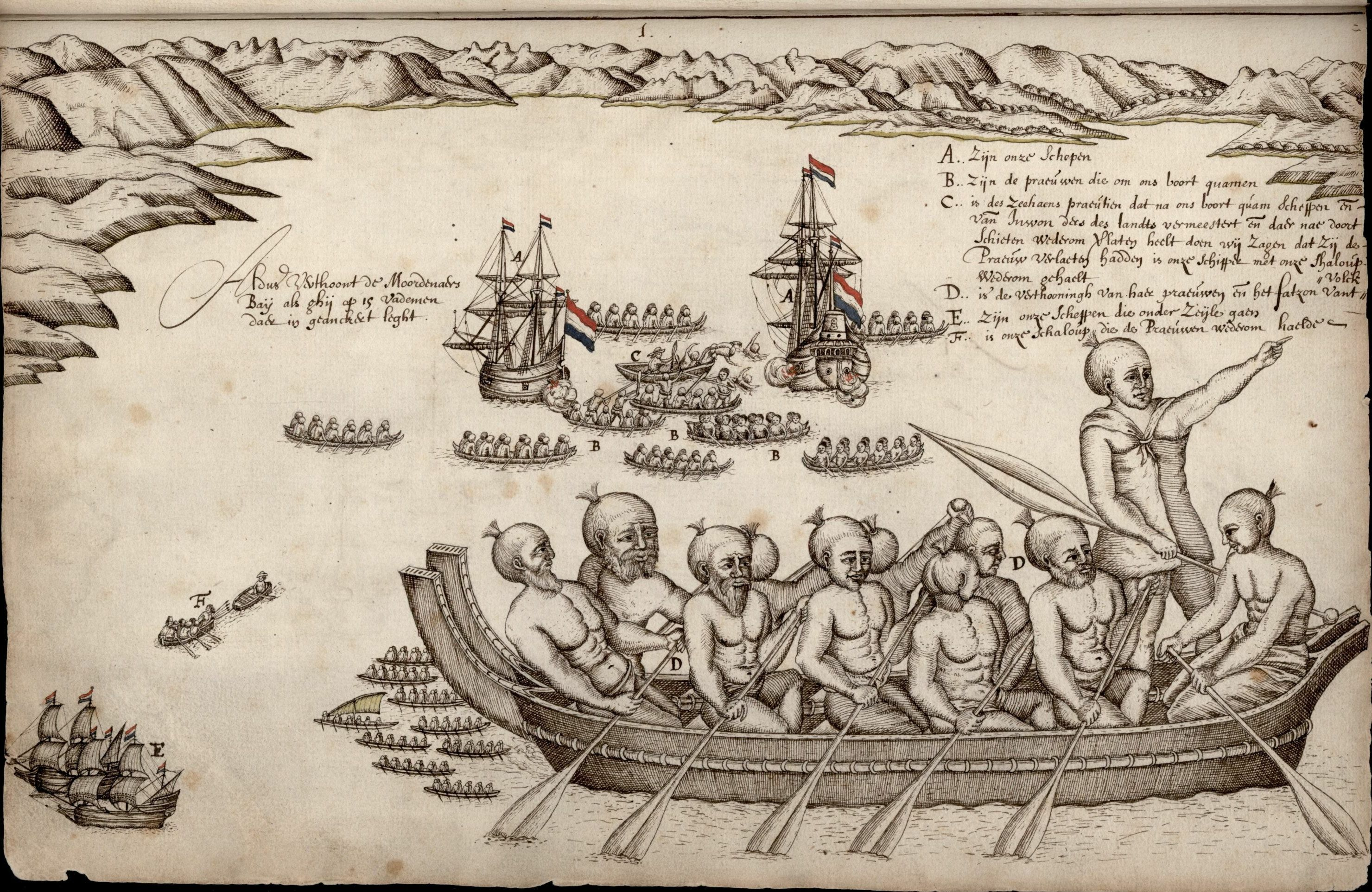
Murderers' Bay, drawing by Isaack Gilsemans, 1642

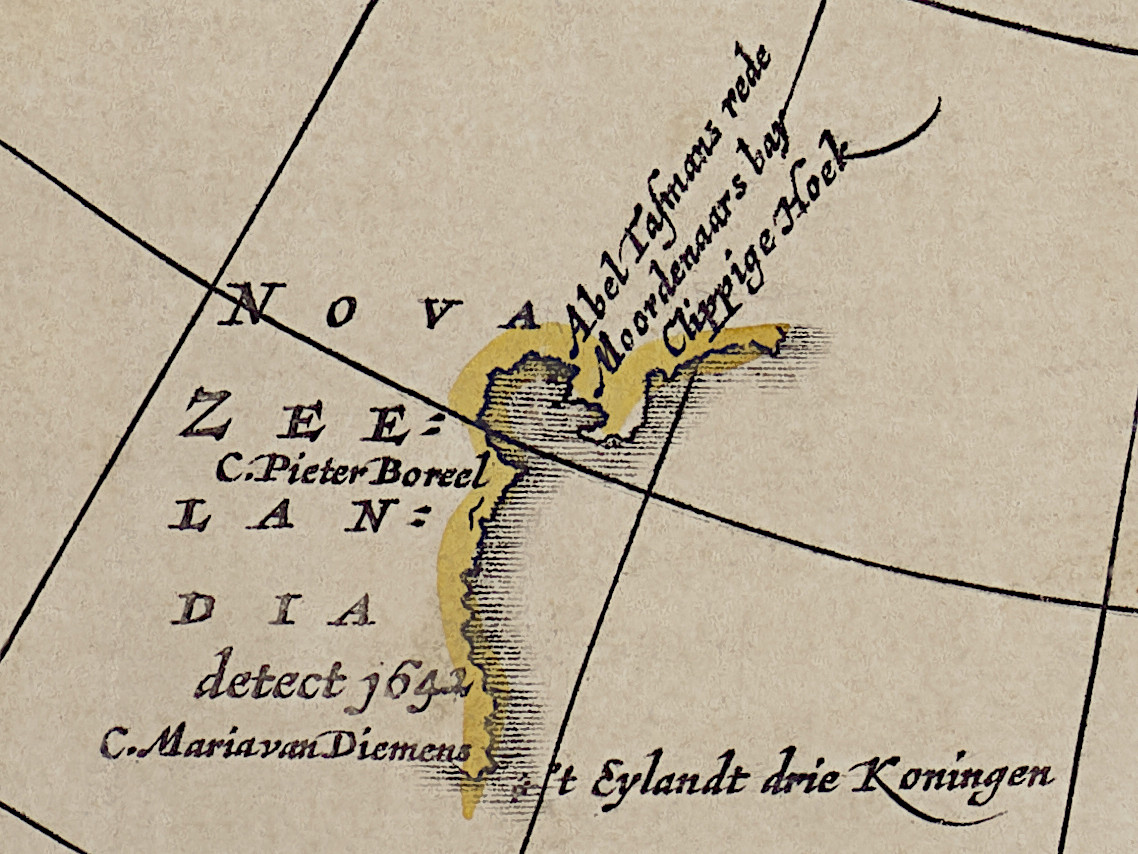
Detail from a 1666 map by Jan Janssonius, showing the western coastline of Nova Zeelandia.

In 1642, the first Europeans known to reach New Zealand were the crew of Dutch explorer Abel Tasman who arrived in his ships Heemskerck and Zeehaen. Tasman anchored at the northern end of the South Island in Golden Bay (he named it Murderers' Bay) in December 1642 and sailed northward to Tonga following a clash with local Māori. Tasman sketched sections of the two main islands' west coasts. Tasman called them Staten Landt, after the States General of the Netherlands, and that name appeared on his first maps of the country. In 1645 Dutch cartographers changed the name to Nova Zeelandia in Latin, from Nieuw Zeeland, after the Dutch province of Zeeland. It was subsequently Anglicised as New Zealand by British naval captain James Cook

Various claims have been made that New Zealand was reached by other non-Polynesian voyagers before Tasman, but these are not widely accepted. Peter Trickett, for example, argues in Beyond Capricorn that the Portuguese explorer Cristóvão de Mendonça reached New Zealand in the 1520s, and the Tamil bell discovered by missionary William Colenso has given rise to a number of theories, but historians generally believe the bell 'is not in itself proof of early Tamil contact with New Zealand'.

In 1643, still during the same expedition, Tasman discovered Fiji.

=== Tongatapu and Haʻapai (Tonga) (1643) ===
Tasman discovered Tongatapu and Haʻapai in 1643 commanding two ships, the Heemskerck and the Zeehaen commissioned by the Dutch East India Company. The expedition's goals were to chart the unknown southern and eastern seas and to find a possible passage through the South Pacific and Indian Ocean providing a faster route to Chile.

=== Sakhalin (Cape Patience) (1643) ===
The first European known to visit Sakhalin was Martin Gerritz de Vries, who mapped Cape Patience and Cape Aniva on the island's east coast in 1643.

=== Kuril Islands (1643) ===
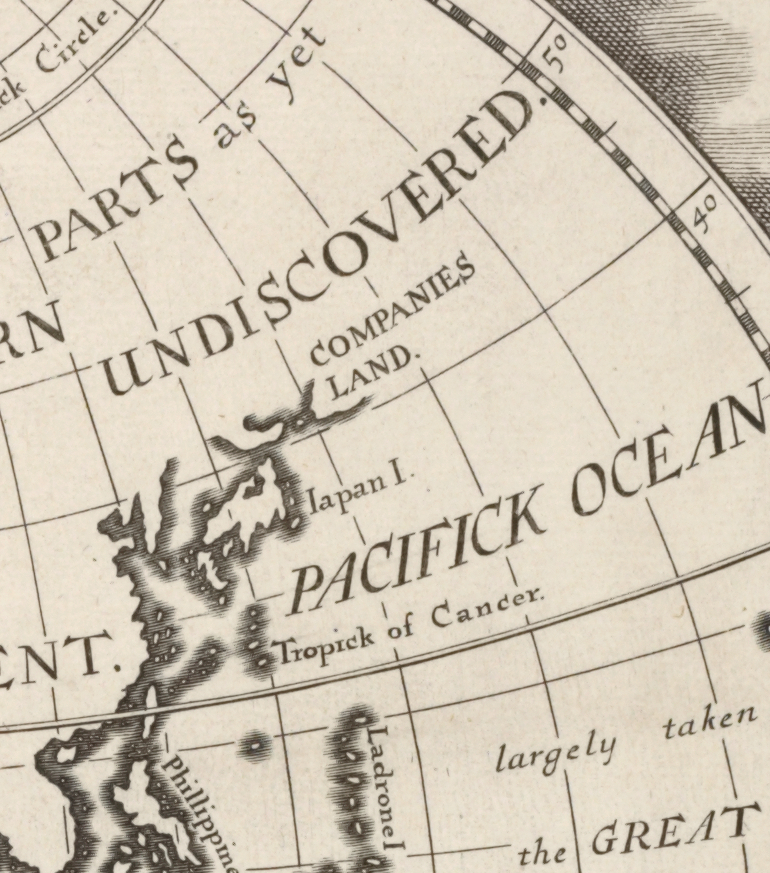
"Companies Land" occupying a vaguely huge region northeast of Japan on an English map from 1700.

In the summer of 1643, the Castricum under Martin Gerritz de Vries explored the waters north of Japan. They are sometimes credited with the discovery of various parts of the Kuril Islands but in fact recorded exaggerated nonsense or phantom islands. The Company Land—named for the VOC—is sometimes presented as Urup but was actually describing an enormous nonexistent extension of Asia or North America that filled European maps for the next century until well after Martin Spanberg proved its nonexistence. Similarly, Staten Island—named for the States General—is sometimes connected to Iturup but was actually described as a large and prosperous island similar to Japan.

Having long occupied maps, Vries Strait—the supposed division between these imaginary places—survived as the name for the strait separating Urup and Iturup, a main division within the Kurils. Similarly, Cape Patience and the Gulf of Patience southeast of Sakhalin in the Sea of Okhotsk preserves the legacy of the sailors on the Castricum who had to wait out thick fog when they first entered the area.

=== Rottnest Island and Swan River (1696) ===
The first Europeans known to land on the Rottnest Island were 13 Dutch sailors including Abraham Leeman from the Waeckende Boey who landed near Bathurst Point on 19 March 1658 while their ship was nearby. The ship had sailed from Batavia in search of survivors of the missing Vergulde Draeck which was later found wrecked 80 kilometres (50 mi) north near present-day Ledge Point. The island was given the name "Rotte nest" (meaning "rat nest" in the 17th century Dutch language) by Dutch captain Willem de Vlamingh who spent six days exploring the island from 29 December 1696, mistaking the quokkas for giant rats. De Vlamingh led a fleet of three ships, De Geelvink, De Nijptang and Weseltje and anchored on the northern side of the island, near The Basin.

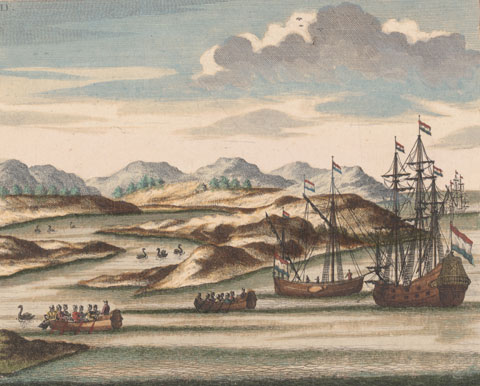
Willem de Vlamingh's ships, with black swans, at the entrance to the Swan River, Western Australia, coloured engraving (1796), derived from an earlier drawing (now lost) from the de Vlamingh expeditions of 1696–97.

On 10 January 1697, de Vlamingh ventured up the Swan River. He and his crew are believed to have been the first Europeans to do so. He named the Swan River (Zwaanenrivier in Dutch) after the large numbers of black swans that he observed there.

=== Easter Island and Samoa (1722) ===
On Easter Sunday, 5 April 1722, Dutch explorer Jacob Roggeveen discovered Easter Island. Easter Island is one of the most remote inhabited islands in the world. The nearest inhabited land (50 residents) is Pitcairn Island 2,075 kilometres (1,289 mi) away, the nearest town with a population over 500 is Rikitea on island Mangareva 2,606 km (1,619 mi) away, and the nearest continental point lies in central Chile, 3,512 kilometres (2,182 mi) away.

The name "Easter Island" was given by the island's first recorded European visitor, the Dutch explorer Jacob Roggeveen, who encountered it on Easter Sunday (5 April) 1722, while searching for Davis or David's island. Roggeveen named it Paasch-Eyland (18th century Dutch for "Easter Island"). The island's official Spanish name, Isla de Pascua, also means "Easter Island".

On 13 June Roggeveen discovered the islands of Samoa.

=== Orange River (1779) ===
The Orange River was named by Colonel Robert Gordon, commander of the Dutch East India Company garrison at Cape Town, on a trip to the interior in 1779.
