= Louisa Island (Tasmania) =

Island in South West Tasmania, Australia

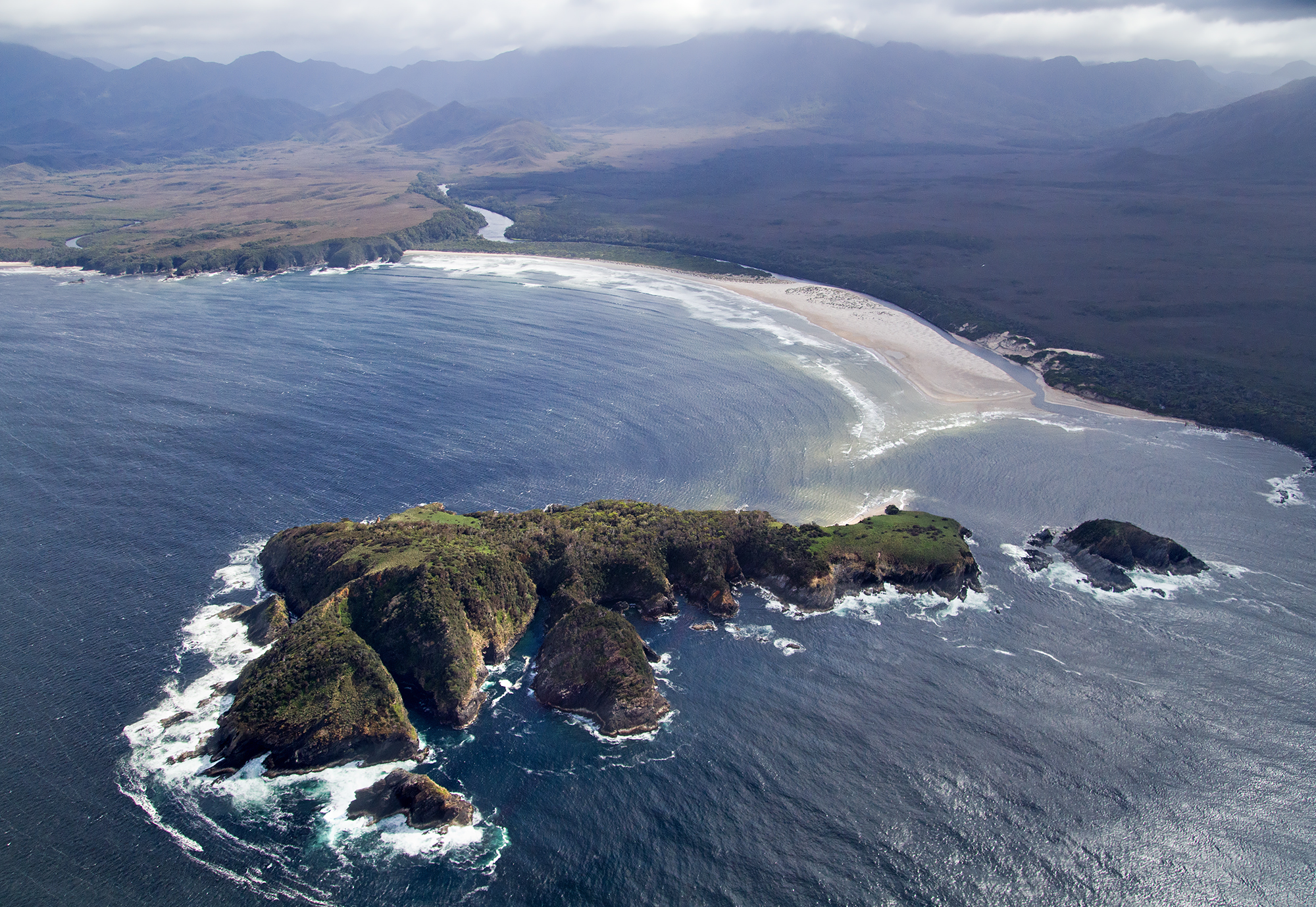
- Louisa Island and Louisa Bay from the air

- Location within Tasmania

Geography
- Location: South West Tasmania
- Coordinates: 43°32′02″S 146°21′32″E
- Archipelago: Maatsuyker Islands Group
- Adjacent to: Southern Ocean
- Area: 23 ha (57 acres)
- Highest elevation: 80 m (260 ft)

Administration
- Australia
- State: Tasmania
- Region: South West

Demographics
- Population: Unpopulated

Louisa Island is an island with a short sandy tombolo, located adjacent to the south-western coast of Tasmania, Australia. The irregularly shaped 23-hectare (0.089 sq mi) island is part of the Maatsuyker Islands Group, and comprises part of the Southwest National Park and the Tasmanian Wilderness World Heritage Site.

The island's highest point is 80 metres (260 ft) above sea level and, at low tide, the island is joined to the mainland by a 250 metres (820 ft) sand spit.

== Flora and fauna ==
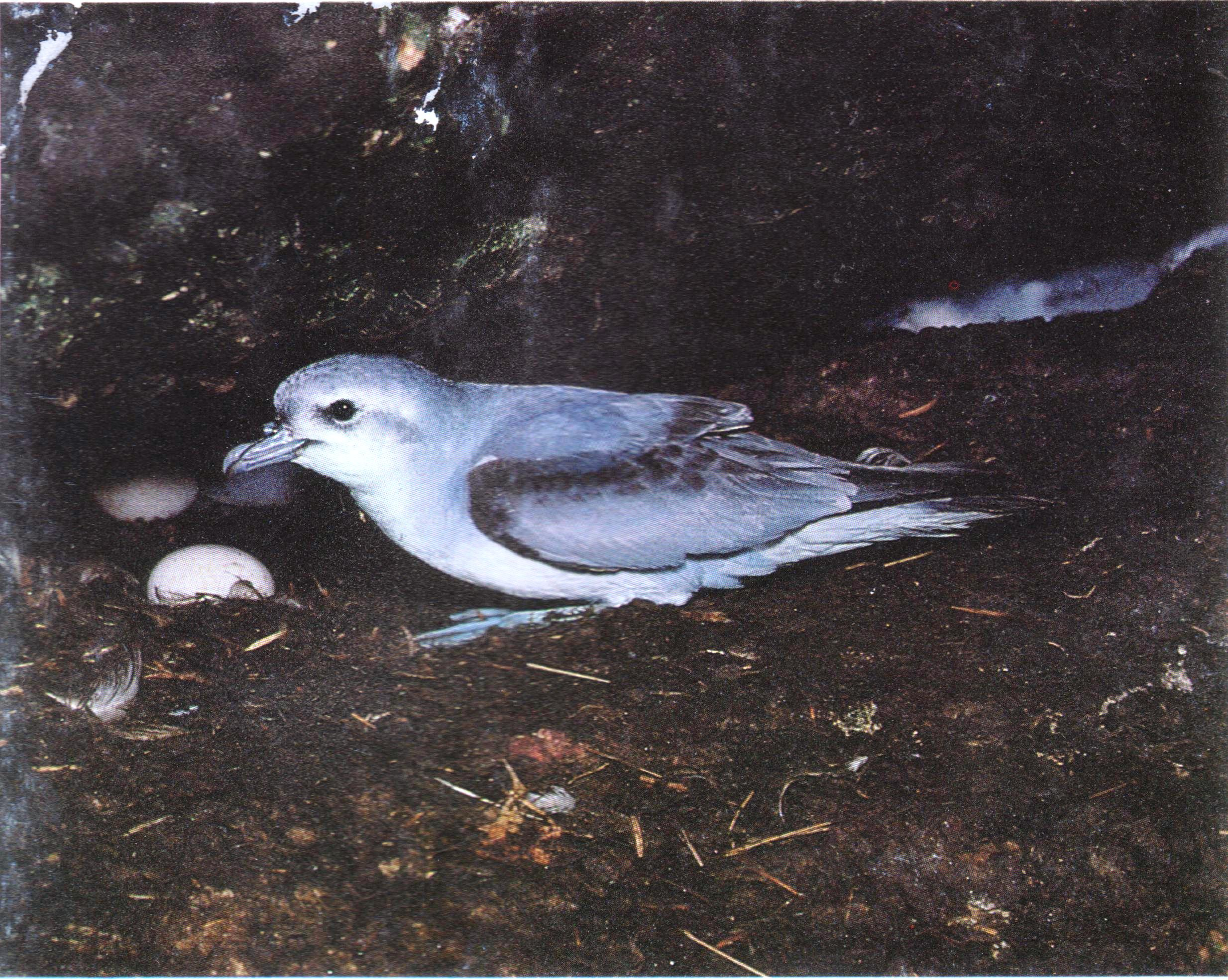
The island is a breeding site for fairy prions

The central parts of the island are lightly forested with Eucalyptus nitida and Eucalyptus ovata, with an understorey of Leptospermum scoparium and Melaleuca squarrosa. Bracken covers areas subjected to recent fires.

The island is part of the Maatsuyker Island Group Important Bird Area, identified as such by BirdLife International because of its importance as a breeding site for seabirds. Recorded breeding seabird and wader species are the little penguin, short-tailed shearwater (206,000 pairs), fairy prion (400 pairs), common diving-petrel (1600 pairs), Pacific gull, sooty oystercatcher and pied oystercatcher. Mammals present include the Tasmanian pademelon and long-nosed potoroo. The Tasmanian tree skink is present.

== See also ==
- South East Cape
- South West Cape
- List of islands of Tasmania
