= Needle Rocks =

Group of islets in Tasmania, Australia

Nickname: The Needles
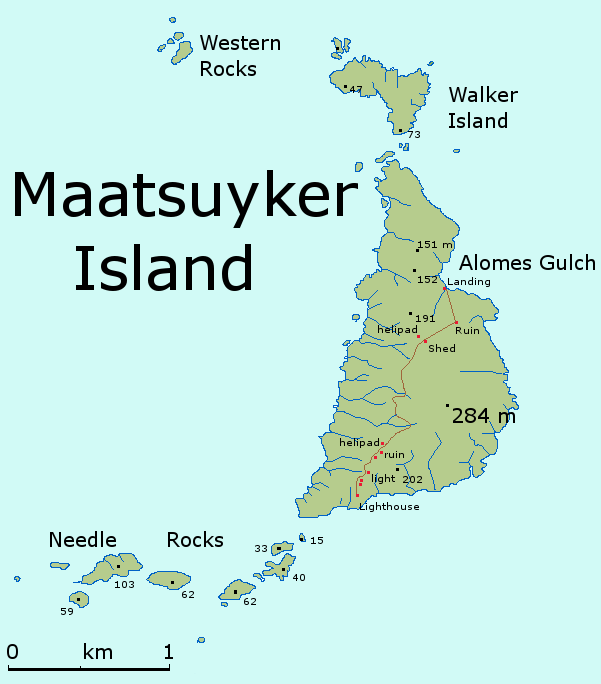
- Detailed map of Needle Rocks, with Maatsuyker Island, Walker Island and Western Rocks

- Location within Tasmania

Geography
- Location: South West Tasmania
- Coordinates: 43°39′45″S 146°15′19″E
- Archipelago: Maatsuyker Islands Group
- Adjacent to: Southern Ocean
- Area: 10.5 ha (26 acres)

Administration
- Australia
- State: Tasmania
- Region: South West

Demographics
- Population: Unpopulated

The Needle Rocks, also known as the Needles, are a group of five main rock islets located close to the south-western coast of Tasmania, Australia. With a combined area of approximately 10.5 hectares (0.041 sq mi), the islets are part of the Maatsuyker Islands Group, and comprise part of the Southwest National Park and the Tasmanian Wilderness World Heritage Site.

The Maatsuyker Island Lighthouse is located on Maatsuyker Island and illuminates the Needle Rocks.

== Fauna ==
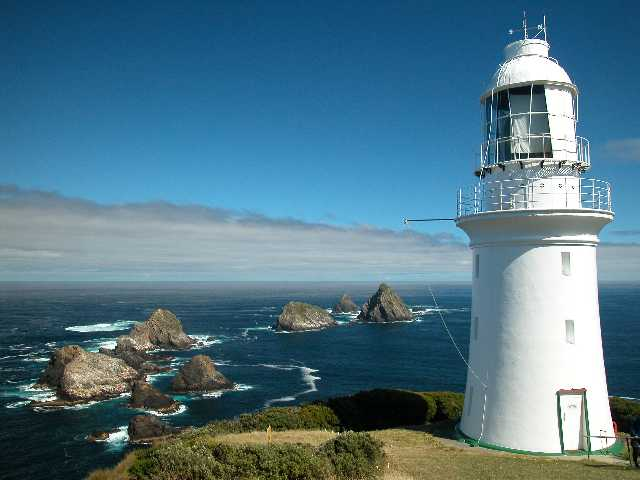
Maatsuyker Island Lighthouse and Needle Rocks

The vegetation is dominated by the pig face, a succulent plant.

The islets are part of the Maatsuyker Island Group Important Bird Area, identified as such by BirdLife International because of its importance as a breeding site for seabirds. Recorded breeding seabird and wader species are the little penguin (40 pairs), short-tailed shearwater (860 pairs), fairy prion (10,600 pairs), Pacific gull, silver gull, sooty oystercatcher and black-faced cormorant. The metallic skink is present. Up to 1200 Australian fur seals use the rocks as a regular haul-out site.

== See also ==
- South East Cape
- South West Cape
- List of islands of Tasmania
