= Ile du Golfe =

Island in Tasmania, Australia

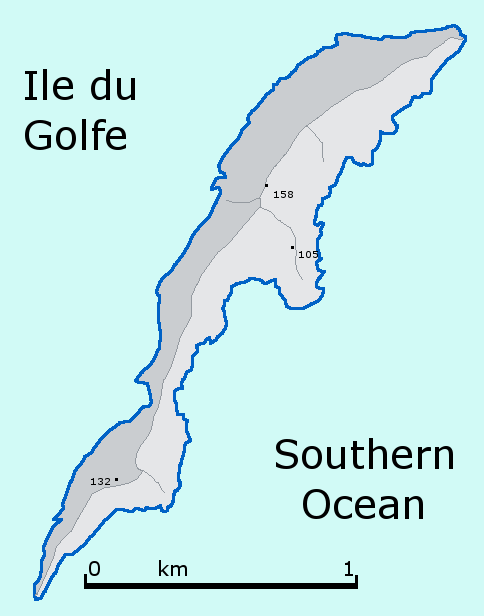
- A map of Ile Du Golfe

- Location within Tasmania

Geography
- Location: South West Tasmania
- Coordinates: 43°34′12″S 146°31′12″E
- Archipelago: Maatsuyker Islands Group
- Adjacent to: Southern Ocean
- Area: 68 ha (170 acres)
- Highest elevation: 156 m (512 ft)

Administration
- Australia
- State: Tasmania
- Region: South West

Demographics
- Population: Unpopulated

The Ile du Golfe is a limestone island located close to the south-western coast of Tasmania, Australia. The long, narrow dolphin-shaped 68-hectare (0.26 sq mi) island is part of the Maatsuyker Islands Group, and comprises part of the Southwest National Park and the Tasmanian Wilderness World Heritage Site.

The island's highest point is 156 metres (512 ft) above sea level.

== Fauna ==
The island is part of the Maatsuyker Island Group Important Bird Area, identified as such by BirdLife International because of its importance as a breeding site for seabirds. Recorded breeding seabird and wader species are the little penguin, short-tailed shearwater (134,000 pairs), fairy prion (356,000 pairs), Pacific gull, silver gull, sooty oystercatcher and black-faced cormorant. The swamp antechinus has been recorded. Reptiles present include the Tasmanian tree skink, metallic skink and three-lined skink.

== See also ==
- South East Cape
- South West Cape
- List of islands of Tasmania
