= De Witt Island =

Island in Tasmania, Australia

Nickname: Big Witch
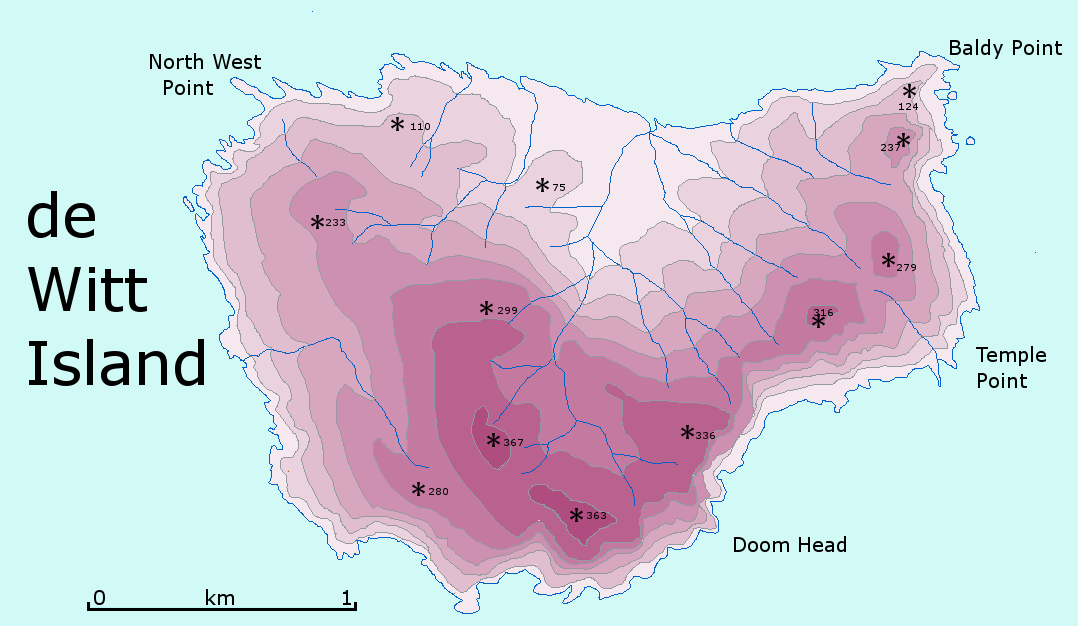
- Detailed map of De Witt Island

- Location within Tasmania
- Etymology: Cornelis Jan Witsen, a Commissioner of the Dutch East India Company

Geography
- Location: South West Tasmania
- Coordinates: 43°35′24″S 146°21′00″E
- Archipelago: Maatsuyker Islands Group
- Adjacent to: Southern Ocean
- Area: 516 ha (1,280 acres)
- Width: 3 km (1.9 mi)
- Highest elevation: 340 m (1120 ft)

Administration
- Australia
- State: Tasmania
- Region: South West

Demographics
- Population: Unpopulated

Additional information
- Register of the National Estate

De Witt Island, also known as Big Witch, is an island located close to the south-western coast of Tasmania, Australia. The 516-hectare (1.99 sq mi) island is the largest of the Maatsuyker Islands Group, and comprises part of the Southwest National Park and the Tasmanian Wilderness World Heritage Site. The island is listed on the Australian Register of the National Estate.

== Location and features ==
De Witt Island lies some 6 kilometres (3.7 mi) south of Louisa Bay, on Tasmania's south coast. Abel Tasman discovered it in 1642 and named it Witsen or Wits Eijlanden. The island is broadly triangular in shape, some 3 kilometres (1.9 mi) across, with cliffs ranging from 250 to 300 metres (820 to 980 ft) high to the south on all sides except a part of the central north coast. The highest parts of the island are located very close to the south coast, and enclose a north-facing basin. The island's 340-metre (1,120 ft) summit is located very close to its southernmost point. Although currently uninhabited, it has a long history of human usage, including logging and occasional habitation. The island is part of the Maatsuyker Island Group Important Bird Area, identified as such by BirdLife International because of its importance as a breeding site for seabirds.

The island is extensively forested with the principal species being Eucalyptus nitida, swamp gum and messmate. Sheltered areas also have leatherwood and myrtle beech.

Recorded breeding seabird and wader species are the little penguin (500 pairs), short-tailed shearwater (11,000 pairs), fairy prion (50 pairs), silver gull and sooty oystercatcher. Swift parrots have been recorded. Mammals present include the Tasmanian pademelon, long-nosed potoroo and swamp rat. Reptiles recorded are the metallic skink and Tasmanian tree skink.

== See also ==
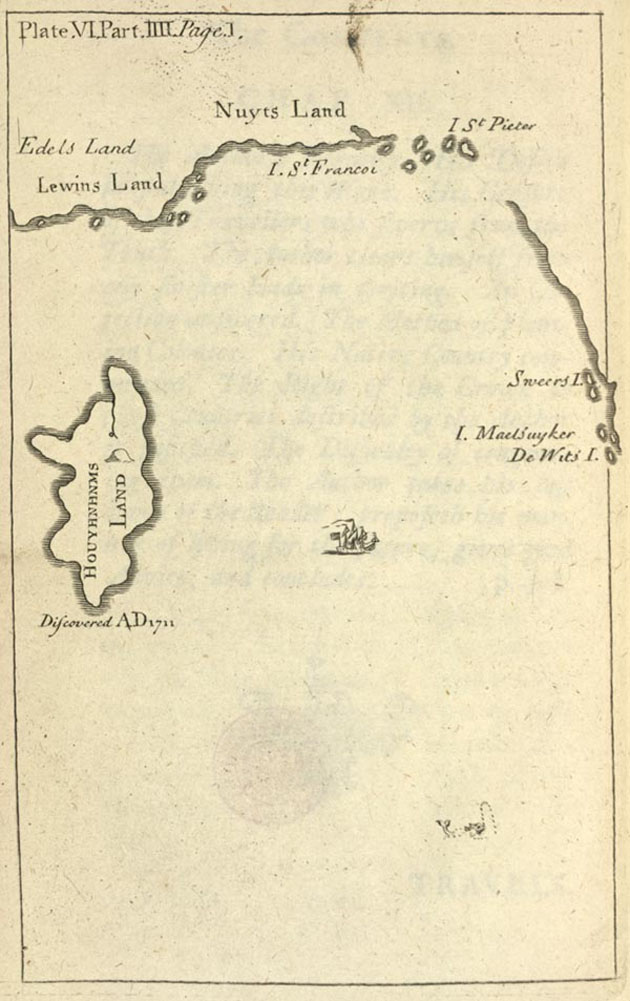
De Wit I was on the map of Houyhnhnms Land in Gulliver's Travels

- South East Cape
- South West Cape
- List of islands of Tasmania
