= Chicken Island (Tasmania) =

Island in Tasmania, Australia

- Location within Tasmania

Geography
- Location: South West Tasmania
- Coordinates: 43°34′12″S 146°36′00″E
- Archipelago: Maatsuyker Islands Group
- Adjacent to: Southern Ocean
- Area: 1.95 ha (4.8 acres)

Administration
- Australia
- State: Tasmania
- Region: South West

Demographics
- Population: Unpopulated

Chicken Island is an island located close to the south-western coast of Tasmania, Australia. The low, flat, 1.95-hectare (0.0075 sq mi) island is part of the Maatsuyker Islands Group, and comprises part of the Southwest National Park and the Tasmanian Wilderness World Heritage Site.

== Flora and fauna ==
The vegetation is dominated by Sarcocornia quinqueflora and Senecio pinnatifolius. Recorded breeding seabird and wader species are the little penguin, short-tailed shearwater, fairy prion, common diving-petrel, Pacific gull, silver gull, sooty oystercatcher and Caspian tern.

== See also ==
- South East Cape
- South West Cape
- List of islands of Tasmania
