= Flat Top Island =

Island in Australia

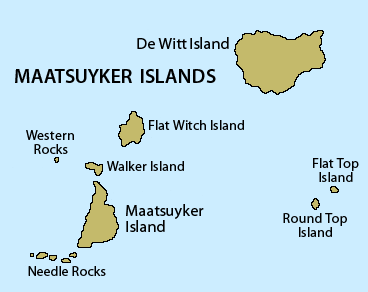
- Detailed map of the Maatsuyker Islands Group, showing Flat Top Island on the right

- Location within Tasmania

Geography
- Location: South West Tasmania
- Coordinates: 43°37′48″S 146°22′48″E
- Archipelago: Maatsuyker Islands Group
- Adjacent to: Southern Ocean
- Area: 1.58 ha (3.9 acres)

Administration
- Australia
- State: Tasmania
- Region: South West

Demographics
- Population: Unpopulated

Flat Top Island is an island located close to the south-western coast of Tasmania, Australia. The 1.58-hectare (0.0061 sq mi) island is part of the Maatsuyker Islands Group, and comprises part of the Southwest National Park and the Tasmanian Wilderness World Heritage Site.

== Fauna ==
The island is part of the Maatsuyker Island Group Important Bird Area, identified as such by BirdLife International because of its importance as a breeding site for seabirds. Recorded breeding seabird species are the short-tailed shearwater (400 pairs), fairy prion (5000 pairs), common diving-petrel (1000 pairs) and Pacific gull. The island is a haul-out site for the Australian fur seal. The Tasmanian tree skink is present.

== See also ==
- South East Cape
- South West Cape
- List of islands of Tasmania
