= Walker Island (Southern Tasmania) =

Island in southern Tasmania, Australia

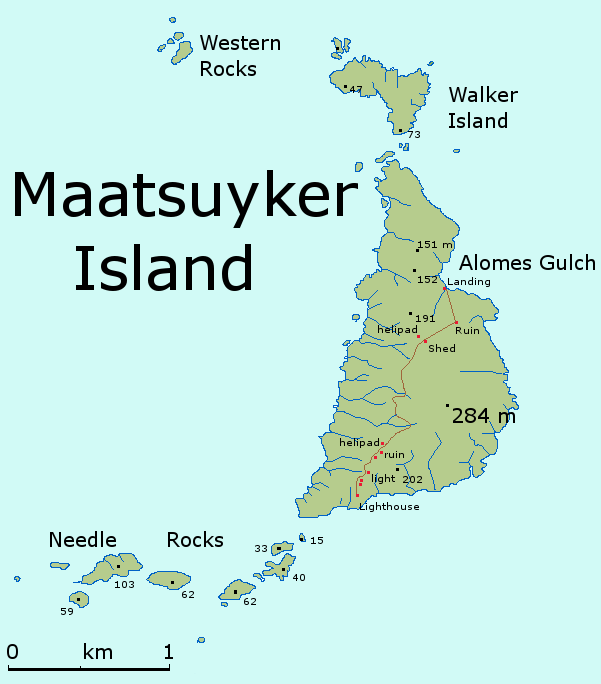
- Detailed map of Maatsuyker Island, showing Walker Island to the north and Needle Rocks to the south

- Location within Tasmania

Geography
- Location: South West Tasmania
- Coordinates: 43°37′48″S 146°16′12″E
- Archipelago: Maatsuyker Islands Group
- Adjacent to: Southern Ocean
- Area: 15 ha (37 acres)

Administration
- Australia
- State: Tasmania
- Region: South West

Demographics
- Population: Unpopulated

Walker Island is an island located close to the south-western coast of Tasmania, Australia. The 15-hectare (0.058 sq mi) island is part of the Maatsuyker Islands Group, and comprise part of the Southwest National Park and the Tasmanian Wilderness World Heritage Site.

== Fauna ==
Walker Island is part of the Maatsuyker Island Group Important Bird Area, identified as such by BirdLife International because of its importance as a breeding site for seabirds. Recorded breeding seabird and wader species are the little penguin (2-300 pairs), short-tailed shearwater (146,000 pairs), fairy prion (3,000 pairs), common diving-petrel (500 pairs), silver gull and sooty oystercatcher. The island is a haul-out site for the Australian fur seal and an occasional breeding site for the New Zealand fur seal. The Tasmanian tree skink is present.

== See also ==
- South East Cape
- South West Cape
- List of islands of Tasmania
