= Hen Island (Tasmania) =

Island in Tasmania, Australia

- Location within Tasmania

Geography
- Location: South West Tasmania
- Coordinates: 43°34′12″S 146°34′48″E
- Archipelago: Maatsuyker Islands Group
- Adjacent to: Southern Ocean
- Area: 7.6 ha (19 acres)
- Highest elevation: 75 m (246 ft)

Administration
- Australia
- State: Tasmania
- Region: South West

Demographics
- Population: Unpopulated

Hen Island is an island located close to the south-western coast of Tasmania, Australia. The 7.6-hectare (0.029 sq mi) island is part of the Maatsuyker Islands Group, and comprises part of the Southwest National Park and the Tasmanian Wilderness World Heritage Site.

The island's highest point is 75 metres (246 ft) above sea level.

== Fauna ==
The island is part of the Maatsuyker Island Group Important Bird Area, identified as such by BirdLife International because of its importance as a breeding site for seabirds. Recorded breeding seabird and wader species are the little penguin (90 pairs), short-tailed shearwater (12,000 pairs), fairy prion (27,000 pairs), Pacific gull and sooty oystercatcher. The metallic skink is present.

== See also ==
- South East Cape
- South West Cape
- List of islands of Tasmania
