= Flat Witch Island =

Island in Tasmania, Australia

Nickname: Little Witch Island
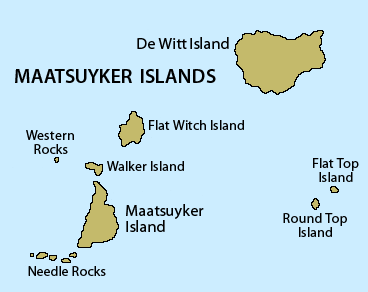
- Detailed map of the Maatsuyker Islands Group, showing Flat Witch Island in the centre.

- Location within Tasmania

Geography
- Location: South West Tasmania
- Coordinates: 43°37′12″S 146°17′24″E
- Archipelago: Maatsuyker Islands Group
- Adjacent to: Southern Ocean
- Area: 64 ha (160 acres)
- Highest elevation: 100 m (300 ft)

Administration
- Australia
- State: Tasmania
- Region: South West

Demographics
- Population: Unpopulated

Flat Witch Island, also known as Little Witch Island, is an island located close to the south-western coast of Tasmania, Australia. The 64-hectare (0.25 sq mi) island is part of the Maatsuyker Islands Group, and comprises part of the Southwest National Park and the Tasmanian Wilderness World Heritage Site.

The island's highest point is 100 metres (330 ft) above sea level.

== Fauna ==
The island is part of the Maatsuyker Island Group Important Bird Area, identified as such by BirdLife International because of its importance as a breeding site for seabirds. Recorded breeding seabird and wader species are the little penguin (400 pairs), short-tailed shearwater (500,000 pairs), fairy prion (10,000 pairs), common diving-petrel (100 pairs), Pacific gull, silver gull and sooty oystercatcher. The swamp antechinus has been recorded. Australian and New Zealand fur seals use a haul-out site on the south side of the island, and the latter species has bred there in small numbers. The Tasmanian tree skink is present.

== See also ==
- South East Cape
- South West Cape
- List of islands of Tasmania
