= Round Top Island =

Island in Tasmania, Australia

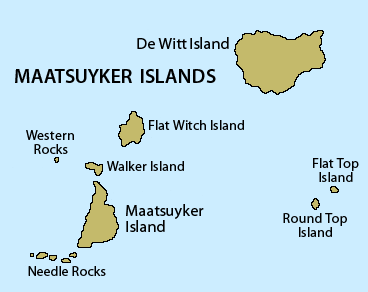
- Detailed map of the Maatsuyker Islands Group, showing Round Top Island in the bottom right.

- Location within Tasmania

Geography
- Location: South West Tasmania
- Coordinates: 43°38′24″S 146°22′12″E
- Archipelago: Maatsuyker Islands Group
- Adjacent to: Southern Ocean
- Area: 6.25 ha (15.4 acres)
- Highest elevation: 165 m (541 ft)

Administration
- Australia
- State: Tasmania
- Region: South West

Demographics
- Population: Unpopulated

Round Top Island is an island located close to the south-western coast of Tasmania, Australia. The 6.25-hectare (0.0241 sq mi) island is part of the Maatsuyker Islands Group, and comprises part of the Southwest National Park and the Tasmanian Wilderness World Heritage Site.

The island's highest point is 165 metres (541 ft) above sea level.

== Fauna ==
The island is part of the Maatsuyker Island Group Important Bird Area, identified as such by BirdLife International because of its importance as a breeding site for seabirds. Recorded breeding seabird species are the short-tailed shearwater (8900 pairs), fairy prion (9300 pairs), common diving-petrel (8700 pairs), Pacific gull and silver gull. The metallic skink and Tasmanian tree skink are present.

== See also ==
- South East Cape
- South West Cape
- List of islands of Tasmania
