= Maatsuyker Island =

Island in Tasmania, Australia

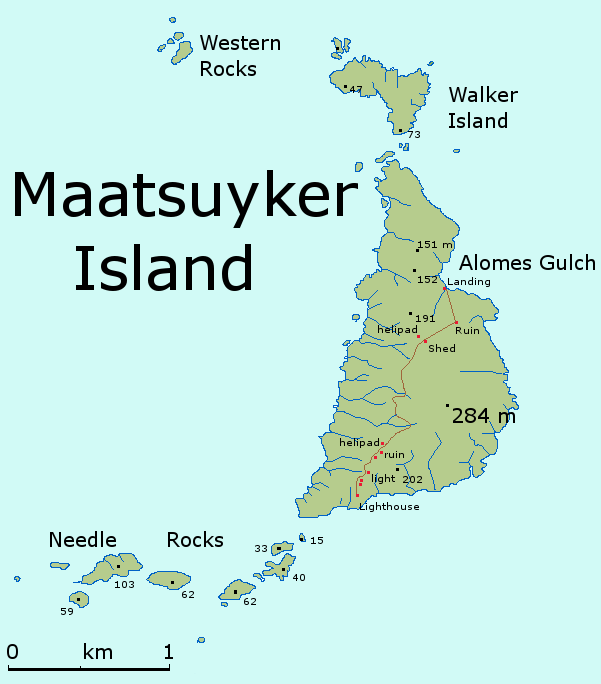
- Detailed map of Maatsuyker Island

- Location within Tasmania
- Etymology: Joan Maetsuicker

Geography
- Location: South West Tasmania
- Coordinates: 43°39′00″S 146°16′12″E
- Archipelago: Maatsuyker Islands Group
- Adjacent to: Southern Ocean
- Area: 186 ha (460 acres)
- Highest elevation: 284 m (932 ft)

Administration
- Australia
- State: Tasmania
- Region: South West

Demographics
- Population: A small number of volunteers

Maatsuyker Island is an island located close to the south coast of Tasmania, Australia. The 186-hectare (0.72 sq mi) island is part of the Maatsuyker Islands Group, and comprises part of the Southwest National Park and the Tasmanian Wilderness World Heritage Site.

The Maatsuyker Island Lighthouse, the southernmost Australian lighthouse, is located on the southern tip of the island. The island is part of the Maatsuyker Island Group Important Bird Area, identified as such by BirdLife International because of its importance as a breeding site for seabirds.

Maatsuyker Island is currently inhabited by volunteers, swapped out every 6 months, the improvements on it are being maintained by the Tasmanian Government and volunteer organisations interested in preserving the history of the island and the lighthouse.

== Flora and fauna ==
The vegetation is dominated by the woody shrub Leptospermum scoparium, or tea tree, which covers most parts of the island, reaching a canopy height of 6 m in sheltered places.

Recorded breeding seabird and wader species are the little penguin (700 pairs), short-tailed shearwater (800,000 pairs), sooty shearwater, fairy prion (5000 pairs), common diving-petrel (10,000 pairs), soft-plumaged petrel, Pacific gull, silver gull and sooty oystercatcher. The swamp antechinus has been recorded.

The island is a haul-out site for the Australian fur seal and a breeding site for the New Zealand fur seal. It is visited by southern elephant seals, which occasionally breed there. Reptiles recorded include the metallic skink, three-lined skink and Tasmanian tree skink.

== Traffic ==
Access to the island has traditionally been by boat, but today helicopters have almost totally taken over this role.

== Climate ==
Because the island is so far south and is entirely dominated by circumpolar weather systems, mean temperatures are significantly colder than most of Australia. Maatsuyker Island has an annual mean temperature of around 11 °C (52 °F) with strikingly cool summers that are reminiscent of those in northern Scotland, despite sharing a latitude with Nice in southern France. Wind is almost constant and often vigorous.

Weather conditions in the area can be extreme, with the Roaring Forties wind being a particular problem. The maximum wind gust recorded was 185 km/h (115 mph). There are an average of 250 rain days a year. Snow falls occasionally to beach level, while sleet is a common occurrence.

Reportedly, the first keepers of the light took chickens with them to Maatsuyker but the fowls were blown away into the ocean. Given the wind and lack of shelter, this is possible if they were left outside during storms. Vegetables get blown flat by the wind, but surprisingly, can be grown successfully, even though the garden is on the west side of the island, facing into the prevailing winds. Due to the high vegetation in patches on the top of the island, it is possible to shelter on the "jeep trail" that runs from the lighthouse to the landing. Several vehicles have been used here over the years, including Suzuki Sierras in the 1980s.

Weather observations have been recorded continuously from the island since 1891 for rainfall; mean temperatures from 1936, and extreme temperatures from 1957.

Climate data for Maatsuyker Island Lighthouse (43.66° S, 146.27° E)
Month	Jan	Feb	Mar	Apr	May	Jun	Jul	Aug	Sep	Oct	Nov	Dec	Year
Record high °C (°F)	34.1 (93.4)	34.7 (94.5)	32.4 (90.3)	31.0 (87.8)	22.0 (71.6)	20.0 (68.0)	17.8 (64.0)	21.8 (71.2)	25.6 (78.1)	28.0 (82.4)	33.0 (91.4)	32.9 (91.2)	34.7 (94.5)
Mean daily maximum °C (°F)	17.1 (62.8)	17.3 (63.1)	16.3 (61.3)	14.5 (58.1)	12.8 (55.0)	11.5 (52.7)	11.0 (51.8)	11.2 (52.2)	12.2 (54.0)	13.3 (55.9)	14.4 (57.9)	15.7 (60.3)	13.9 (57.1)
Mean daily minimum °C (°F)	10.9 (51.6)	11.2 (52.2)	10.7 (51.3)	9.6 (49.3)	8.5 (47.3)	7.4 (45.3)	6.7 (44.1)	6.5 (43.7)	6.9 (44.4)	7.5 (45.5)	8.5 (47.3)	9.7 (49.5)	8.7 (47.6)
Record low °C (°F)	3.5 (38.3)	5.0 (41.0)	1.7 (35.1)	0.2 (32.4)	0.7 (33.3)	−1.1 (30.0)	−1 (30)	0.0 (32.0)	0.6 (33.1)	−1.1 (30.0)	2.0 (35.6)	3.2 (37.8)	−1.1 (30.0)
Average precipitation mm (inches)	77.4 (3.05)	69.4 (2.73)	84.4 (3.32)	107.1 (4.22)	115.9 (4.56)	116.3 (4.58)	128.3 (5.05)	123.6 (4.87)	107.6 (4.24)	104.8 (4.13)	90.8 (3.57)	88.9 (3.50)	1,213.9 (47.79)
Average precipitation days (≥ 0.2 mm)	17.4	14.7	18.3	20.7	22.8	22.0	24.2	24.6	22.8	22.7	20.1	19.2	249.5
Average afternoon relative humidity (%)	76	76	78	80	82	82	81	80	79	78	77	77	79
Source: Bureau of Meteorology

== See also ==
- South East Cape
- South West Cape
- List of islands of Tasmania
