= Walker Island =

Walker Island or Walker's Island can refer to:

In Tasmania:

- Walker Island (Southern Tasmania), near Maatsuyker Island
- Walker Island (Northern Tasmania), near Robbins Island

In the United States:

- Conch Key, Florida is also known as Walker's Island
