= Western Rocks =

Western Rocks may refer to

- Western Rocks, Isles of Scilly, a group of uninhabited islets in south-western England
- Western Rocks (Tasmania), a group of uninhabited islets in south-eastern Australia
