= Maatsuyker Islands =

Islands in Tasmania, Australia

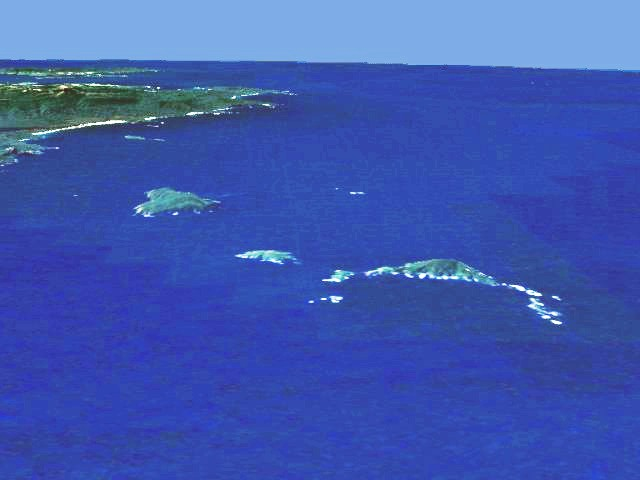
- Aerial view of the group from the west. Needle Rocks is on the right and to the left of them is Maatsuyker Island. De Witt is the larger island on the left. Tasmania and the South East Cape are in the background. The view was computer generated from satellite data using NASA World Wind.

- Location within Tasmania
- Etymology: Joan Maetsuicker

Geography
- Location: Southern Tasmania
- Coordinates: 43°38′24″S 146°16′12″E
- Total islands: 8-12 (depending on sources)
- Major islands: De Witt Island; Maatsuyker Island; Flat Witch Island

Administration
- Australia
- State: Tasmania
- Region: Southern

Demographics
- Population: Unpopulated

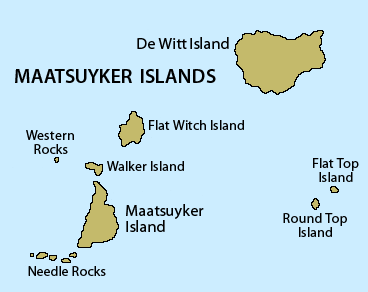
The Maatsuyker Islands

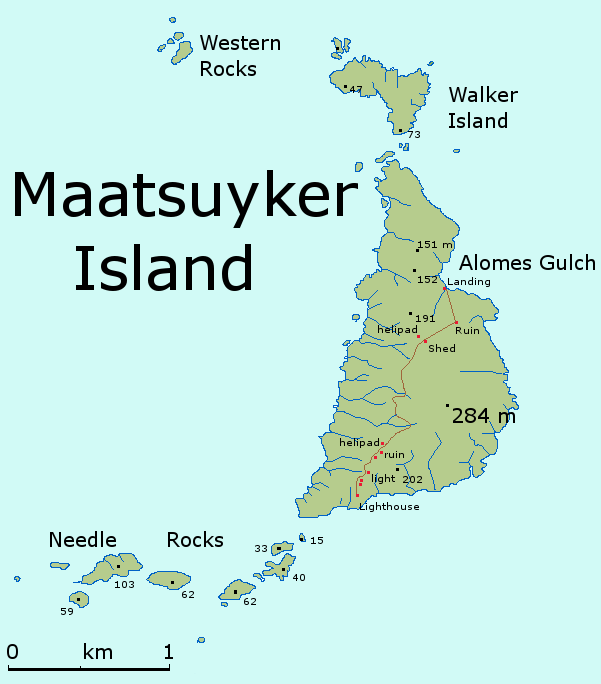
Maatsuyker Island

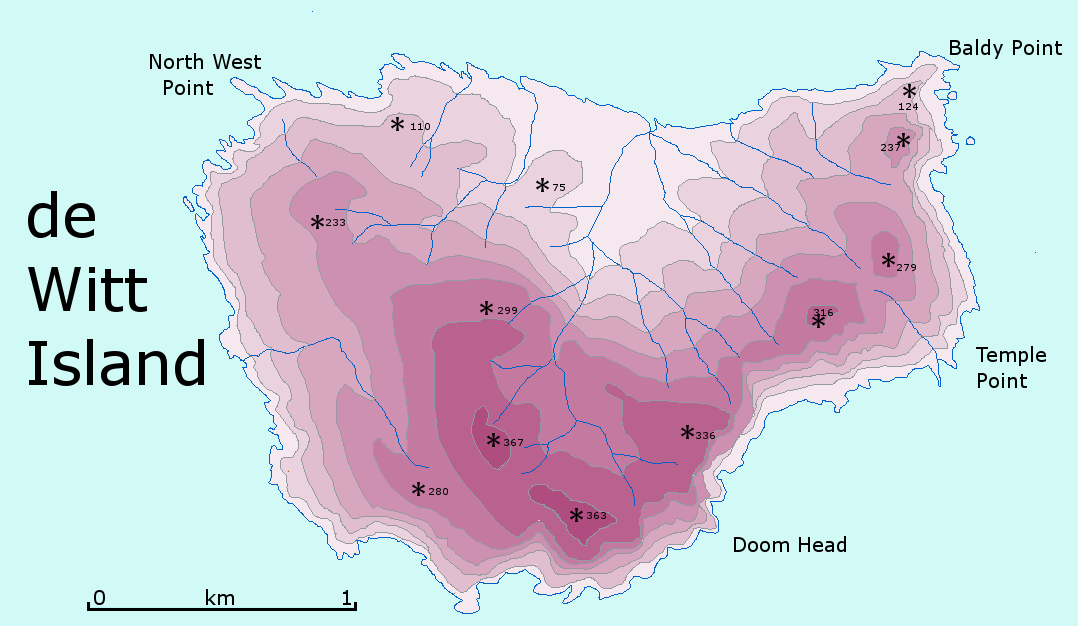
de Witt Island

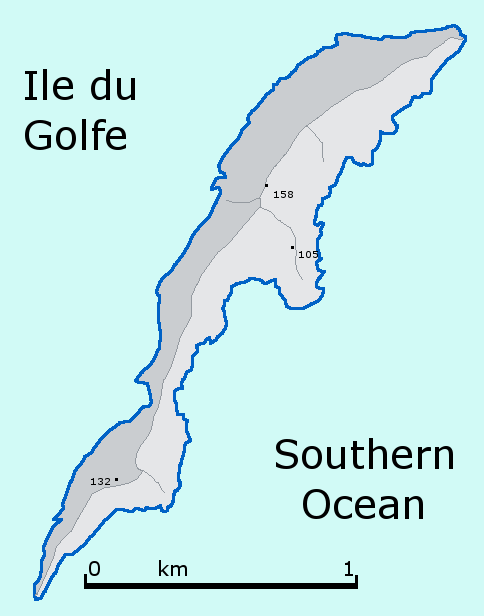
Outline of Ile du Golfe shaped like a dolphin

The Maatsuyker Islands are a group of islands and rocks 5.5 kilometres (3.4 mi) off the south coast of Tasmania, Australia. Maatsuyker Island is the southernmost island of the group and of the Australian continental shelf. There are exposed rocks further south of Maatsuyker but they do not meet the definition of "islands". Macquarie Island, far to the south, is also Australian territory but it is an upthrust piece of ocean floor in the remote Southern Ocean and is in a geological sense completely separate from the continent.

The group is noted for its rich marine wildlife, predominantly wet and windy weather conditions, and Australia's most southerly lighthouse. The group are contained within the Southwest National Park, part of the Tasmanian Wilderness World Heritage Site.

== Geography ==
=== Main group ===
The group consists of at least six islands and two groups of rocks. The main island after which the group is named, Maatsuyker Island, is approximately 2.6 kilometres (1.6 mi) long north/south at its longest on a bearing of 196°, by 1.2 kilometres (0.75 mi) wide east/west at its widest on a bearing of 105°. Needle Rocks, also known unofficially as The Needles, lie just off the south west tip of Maatsuyker Island. Walker Island, Flat Witch Island and the Western Rocks lie just to the north. De Witt Island lies 6.5 kilometres (4.0 mi) to the north-east, and the remaining two islands, Flat Top Island and Round Top Island, are 7 kilometres (4.3 mi) to the east. Maatsuyker Island is near the south side of the group, and its distance from the Tasmanian mainland is around 10.4 kilometres (6.5 mi).

Main group locations
Name	Coordinates	Aliases
De Witt Island	43°35′51″S 146°21′35″E	Big Witch
Flat Top Island	43°38′24″S 146°23′03″E	
Flat Witch Island	43°37′08″S 146°17′35″E	Little Witch
Maatsuyker Island	43°39′18″S 146°16′23″E	
Needle Rocks	43°39′45″S 146°15′19″E	The Needles
Round Top Island	43°38′37″S 146°22′33″E	
Walker Island	43°37′57″S 146°16′33″E	
Western Rocks	43°37′46″S 146°15′29″E	Black Rocks

Sources differ on whether nearby islands are part of the group. The Tasmanian Parks and Wildlife Service includes only the base set above. In his seminal work, Tasmania's offshore islands, Nigel Brothers includes four extra in an extended group.

Extended group locations
Chicken Island	43°34′23″S 146°36′04″E
Hen Island	43°34′12″S 146°34′59″E
Ile du Golfe	43°34′15″S 146°31′30″E
Louisa Island	43°32′13″S 146°20′42″E

The islands are erosional remnants of the Tasmanian mainland, and are typically steep-sided and rocky.

=== Related islands ===
White and Brothers refer to islands in addition to those in the group. These include Breaksea Islands, Eddystone, Kathleen Island, Mewstone, Pedra Branca, Shanks Islands and Trumpeter Islets. Several of these are quite distant from Maatsuyker Island.

== History ==
=== Etymology ===
Abel Tasman led the first known European expedition to reach Tasmania. His journal records that he first sighted Tasmania on 24 November 1642. The translation of the journal entry for 1 December 1642, seven days later, refers to Wit's islands, Sueers islands, Maetsuickers islands (Maatsuyker Islands) and Boereels islands. The names of all of these islands and Tasmania itself under its then name of Van Diemens Land were all names of then members of the Council of India of Tasman's employer, the Dutch East India Company (see Tasman's 1642 orders in Appendix D of the journal). Antonio Van Diemen was the Governor-General and so got the name of the largest island. This journal entry for 1 December came only 7 days after the first sighting of Tasmania, so it is evident that the Maatsuyker Islands Group was named in honour of Joan Maetsuycker (today's spelling would be Johan), who was also a councillor.

Other, more recent theories about the origin of the name have also been offered:

- The island was named after a member of Abel Tasman's crew, Mr. Maatsuyker. However, the ship's log book has been preserved and there was not anyone on board with that name.
- It has been suggested that the word in Dutch means "mate seeker" and that the sealers of old stopped at the island seeking Aboriginal women as wives. However, "seeker" in Dutch is "zoeker", not "suicker." Nevertheless, there is direct evidence that Aborigine people visited the island possibly thousands of years before European settlement.
- The word in Dutch means "measure of sugar". This has led some people to suggest - erroneously - that the island, capped with guano, may have resembled a tablespoon of sugar rising above the surface of the sea and that inspired the name.

=== Lighthouse ===
In 1891 a lighthouse was completed on Maatsuyker Island and until today it remains Australia's most southerly lighthouse. From the inauguration until the installation of the automated light, the lighthouse was maintained by a small staff of lighthouse keepers, who constituted the total population of the island.

Maatsuyker Island Lighthouse was the last Australian lighthouse still being officially operated by lightkeepers. A second, smaller and automated lighthouse was installed in 1996 but it is unclear whether volunteers are going to continue to work the lights on Maatsuyker Island.

== Climate ==
Because the island is so far south and is entirely dominated by circumpolar weather systems, mean temperatures are significantly colder than most of Australia. Maatsuyker Island has an annual mean temperature of around 11 °C (52 °F) with strikingly cool summers that are reminiscent of those in northern Scotland, despite sharing a latitude with Nice in southern France. Wind is almost constant and often vigorous.

Weather conditions in the area can be extreme, with the Roaring Forties wind being a particular problem. The maximum wind gust recorded was 185 km/h (115 mph). There are an average of 250 rain days a year. Snow falls occasionally to beach level, while sleet is a common occurrence.

Reportedly, the first keepers of the light took chickens with them to Maatsuyker but the fowls blew away into the ocean. Given the wind and lack of shelter, this is possible if they were left outside during storms. Vegetables get blown flat by the wind, but surprisingly, can be grown successfully, even though the garden is on the west side of the island, facing into the prevailing winds. Due to the high vegetation in patches on the top of the island, it is possible to shelter on the "jeep trail" that runs from the lighthouse to the landing. Several vehicles have been used here over the years, including Suzuki Sierras in the 1980s.

Weather observations have been recorded continuously from the island since 1891 for rainfall; mean temperatures from 1936, and extreme temperatures from 1957.

Climate data for Maatsuyker Island Lighthouse (43.66° S, 146.27° E)
Month	Jan	Feb	Mar	Apr	May	Jun	Jul	Aug	Sep	Oct	Nov	Dec	Year
Record high °C (°F)	34.1 (93.4)	34.7 (94.5)	32.4 (90.3)	31.0 (87.8)	22.0 (71.6)	20.0 (68.0)	17.8 (64.0)	21.8 (71.2)	25.6 (78.1)	28.0 (82.4)	33.0 (91.4)	32.9 (91.2)	34.7 (94.5)
Mean daily maximum °C (°F)	17.1 (62.8)	17.3 (63.1)	16.3 (61.3)	14.5 (58.1)	12.8 (55.0)	11.5 (52.7)	11.0 (51.8)	11.2 (52.2)	12.2 (54.0)	13.3 (55.9)	14.4 (57.9)	15.7 (60.3)	13.9 (57.1)
Mean daily minimum °C (°F)	10.9 (51.6)	11.2 (52.2)	10.7 (51.3)	9.6 (49.3)	8.5 (47.3)	7.4 (45.3)	6.7 (44.1)	6.5 (43.7)	6.9 (44.4)	7.5 (45.5)	8.5 (47.3)	9.7 (49.5)	8.7 (47.6)
Record low °C (°F)	3.5 (38.3)	5.0 (41.0)	1.7 (35.1)	0.2 (32.4)	0.7 (33.3)	−1.1 (30.0)	−1 (30)	0.0 (32.0)	0.6 (33.1)	−1.1 (30.0)	2.0 (35.6)	3.2 (37.8)	−1.1 (30.0)
Average precipitation mm (inches)	77.4 (3.05)	69.4 (2.73)	84.4 (3.32)	107.1 (4.22)	115.9 (4.56)	116.3 (4.58)	128.3 (5.05)	123.6 (4.87)	107.6 (4.24)	104.8 (4.13)	90.8 (3.57)	88.9 (3.50)	1,213.9 (47.79)
Average precipitation days (≥ 0.2 mm)	17.4	14.7	18.3	20.7	22.8	22.0	24.2	24.6	22.8	22.7	20.1	19.2	249.5
Average afternoon relative humidity (%)	76	76	78	80	82	82	81	80	79	78	77	77	79
Source: Bureau of Meteorology

== Flora and fauna ==
=== Flora ===
Maatsuyker Island supports a surprising variety of flora and fauna, although the flora is limited in size by the windy conditions. The soil is reportedly extremely rich due to thousands of years of sea bird guano deposits, and supports a variety of native and imported flora. As a testament to fertility, potatoes sown by former lighthouse keepers now grow wild.

=== Fauna ===
Seals are common and include both New Zealand and Australian fur seals, and southern elephant seal.

The Maatsuyker group is well known for its abundant bird life. Sea birds present include the critically endangered northern soft-plumaged petrel (Pterodroma mollis deceptornis). The first record of soft-plumaged petrels breeding in Australia is from Maatsuyker. The group has been identified by BirdLife International as an Important Bird Area (IBA) because it supports over 1% of the world populations of short-tailed shearwaters (about 1.5 million pairs), fairy prions and black-faced cormorants, as well as thousands of pairs of little penguins and common diving-petrels.

== See also ==
- South East Cape
- South West Cape
- List of islands of Tasmania
