= Western Rocks (Tasmania) =

Islets in Tasmania, Australia

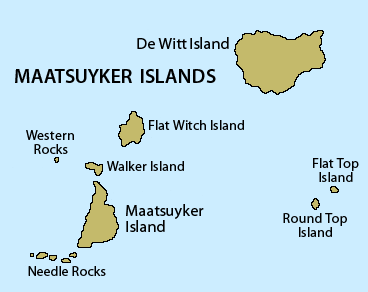
- Detailed map of the Maatsuyker Islands Group, showing Western Rocks mid-left.

- Location within Tasmania

Geography
- Location: South West Tasmania
- Coordinates: 43°37′48″S 146°15′00″E
- Archipelago: Maatsuyker Islands Group
- Adjacent to: Southern Ocean
- Area: 0.29 ha (0.72 acres)
- Highest elevation: 165 m (541 ft)

Administration
- Australia
- State: Tasmania
- Region: South West

Demographics
- Population: Unpopulated

The Western Rocks, also known as Black Rocks, are a pair of islets located close to the south-western coast of Tasmania, Australia. The steep, wave-washed 0.29-hectare (0.0011 sq mi) islets are part of the Maatsuyker Islands Group, and comprises part of the Southwest National Park and the Tasmanian Wilderness World Heritage Site.

== Fauna ==
The only recorded breeding seabird species is the fairy prion with up to 20 pairs in a small patch of succulent vegetation.

== See also ==
- South East Cape
- South West Cape
- List of islands of Tasmania
