= Maatsuyker Island Lighthouse =

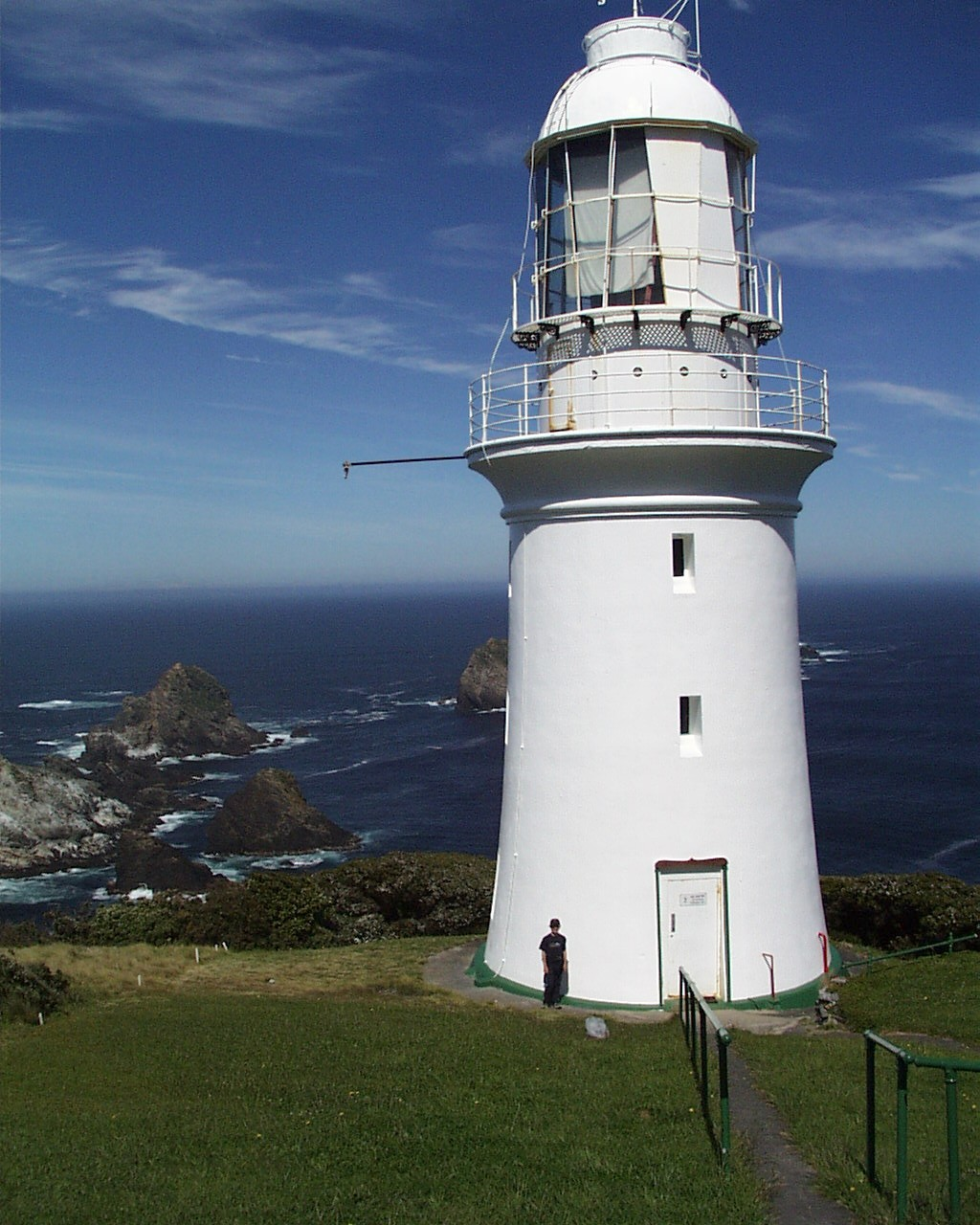
- Maatsuyker Island Lighthouse and the Needle Rocks on a clear day in December 2005.
- Location: Maatsuyker Island; Tasmania; Australia
- Coordinates: 43°39′25″S 146°16′17″E

Tower
- Constructed: 1891 (first)
- Construction: brick tower (first) fiberglass tower (current)
- Height: 15 metres (49 ft) (first)
- Shape: conical tower with balcony and lantern (first)
- Markings: white tower and lantern
- Operator: Australian Maritime Safety Authority
- Heritage: listed on the Tasmanian Heritage Register

Light
- First lit: 1996 (current)
- Deactivated: 1996 (first)
- Focal height: 140 metres (460 ft) (current)
- Lens: First order Fresnel by Chance Brothers
- Range: 26 nautical miles (48 km; 30 mi) (first)
- Characteristic: Fl W 7.5 s. except every fourth flash omitted

Maatsuyker Island Lighthouse is a lighthouse on Maatsuyker Island, Tasmania, Australia. It was the last Australian lighthouse still being officially operated by lightkeepers. A second, smaller, and automated lighthouse was installed in 1996 but it is unclear whether volunteers are going to continue to work the lights on Maatsuyker Island.

== Location ==
The lighthouse is located near the south-west tip of Maatsuyker Island, probably because its main function originally would have been to warn ships approaching from the west and being blown in an easterly direction by the prevailing westerly winds of the Roaring Forties. Many ships were shipwrecked on the south and west coasts of Tasmania from the earliest days of sail, until the advent of modern navigation aids, because of a combination of the westerly gales and the dangerous coastline.

== History ==
In 1891 the lighthouse was completed and until today it remains Australia's most southerly lighthouse. A first order Fresnel lens made by Chance Brothers was used in the lantern and is still operational. From the inauguration until the installation of the automated light, the lighthouse was staffed by volunteer lighthouse keepers, who constituted the total population of the island.

In August 2019, two volunteer lighthouse caretakers became engaged to be married at the lighthouse.

== See also ==
- History of Tasmania
- List of lighthouses in Tasmania
