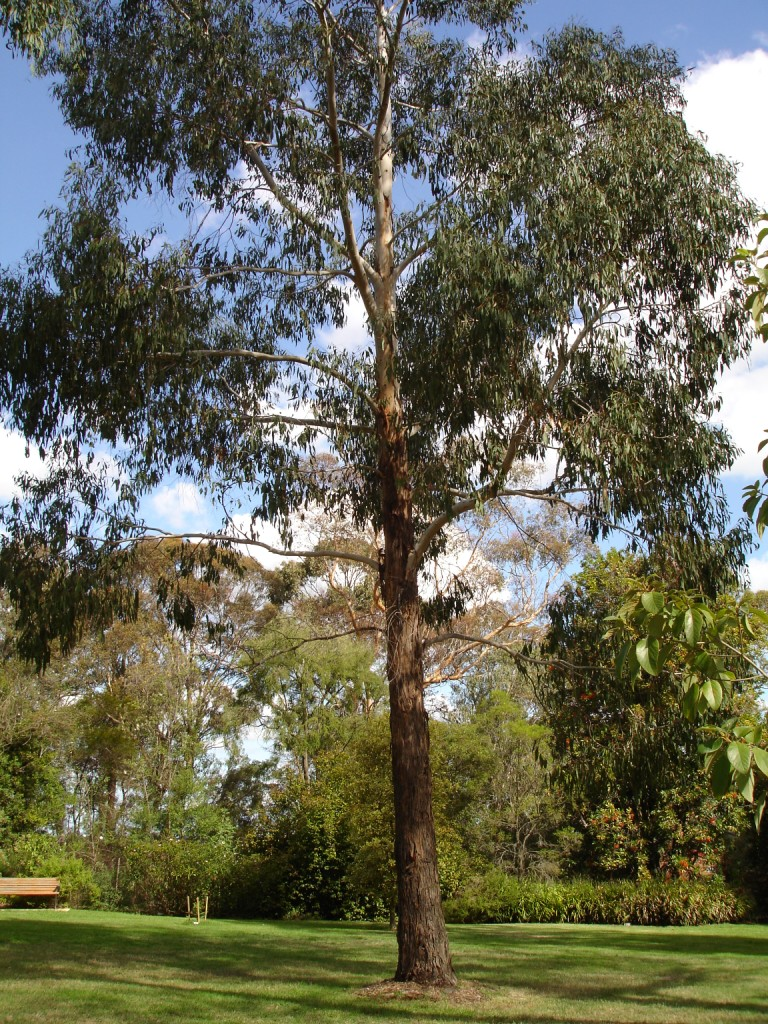
- In Maranoa Gardens

Conservation status
- Vulnerable (IUCN 3.1)

Scientific classification
- Kingdom: Plantae
- Clade: Tracheophytes
- Clade: Angiosperms
- Clade: Eudicots
- Clade: Rosids
- Order: Myrtales
- Family: Myrtaceae
- Genus: Eucalyptus
- Species: E. ovata

Binomial name
- Eucalyptus ovata Labill.
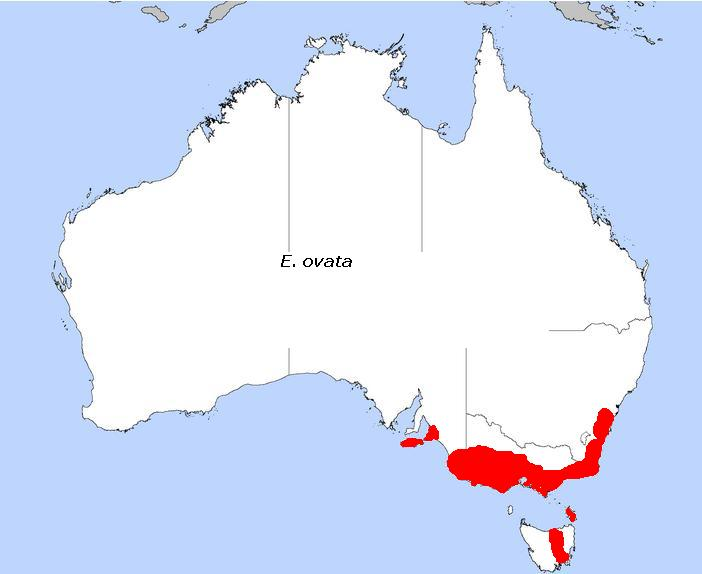
- E. ovata, field distribution

Synonyms
- Eucalyptus muelleri Naudin nom. illeg.

= Eucalyptus ovata =

Swamp gum

Species of eucalyptus

Eucalyptus ovata, commonly known as swamp gum or black gum, is a small to medium-sized tree species that is endemic to south-eastern Australia. It has mostly smooth bark, glossy green, lance-shaped to egg-shaped adult leaves, green flower buds in groups of seven, white flowers and conical to bell-shaped fruit.

== Description ==
Eucalyptus ovata is a tree that typically grows to a height of 17–30 m (56–98 ft) and forms a lignotuber, but with a variable habit, from a straggly sapling in east Gippsland to stout-boled elsewhere. It has smooth, grey, whitish or pinkish-grey new bark, sometimes with loose rough bark near the base of larger trees. Young plants and coppice regrowth have elliptical to egg-shaped leaves that are 30–85 mm (1.2–3.3 in) long and 25–60 mm (0.98–2.36 in) wide. Adult leaves are the same shade of glossy green on both sides, lance-shaped to egg-shaped, 80–180 mm (3.1–7.1 in) long and 16–50 mm (0.63–1.97 in) wide, tapering to a petiole 15–33 mm (0.59–1.30 in) long. The flower buds are arranged in leaf axils on an unbranched peduncle, 3–14 mm (0.12–0.55 in) long, the individual buds on pedicels 2–4 mm (0.079–0.157 in) long. Mature buds are diamond-shaped, 5–9 mm (0.20–0.35 in) long and 4–6 mm (0.16–0.24 in) wide with a conical operculum. Flowering mainly occurs from June to November and the flowers are white. The fruit is a woody, conical to slightly bell-shaped capsule 3–8 mm (0.12–0.31 in) long and 4–8 mm (0.16–0.31 in) wide with the valves near rim level.

== Taxonomy and naming ==
Eucalyptus ovata was first formally described in 1806 by Jacques Labillardière in Novae Hollandiae Plantarum Specimen. The specific epithet (ovata) is from the Latin ovatus, referring to the leaf shape.

In 1916, Joseph Maiden described two varieties of E. ovata in his book, A Critical Revision of the Genus Eucalyptus, and the names are accepted by the Australian Plant Census:

- Eucalyptus ovata subsp. grandiflora Maiden;
- Eucalyptus ovata Labill. subsp. ovata.

== Distribution and habitat ==
Swamp gum is widespread in south-eastern Australia and is found from the western end of Kangaroo Island and the southern Mount Lofty ranges in the south-east of South Australia, to Tasmania, the southern half of Victoria and to south-eastern New South Wales as far north as Oberon and Hill Top. It grows in grassy woodland in low, temporarily or permanently damp sites. It can be found in many wetlands alongside Callitris oblonga (river pine) and together they form the Eucalyptus ovata—Callitris oblonga forests.

In Victoria, Eucalyptus ovata subsp. ovata is known to hybridise with Eucalyptus camaldulensis subsp. camaldulensis as Eucalyptus × studleyensis.
