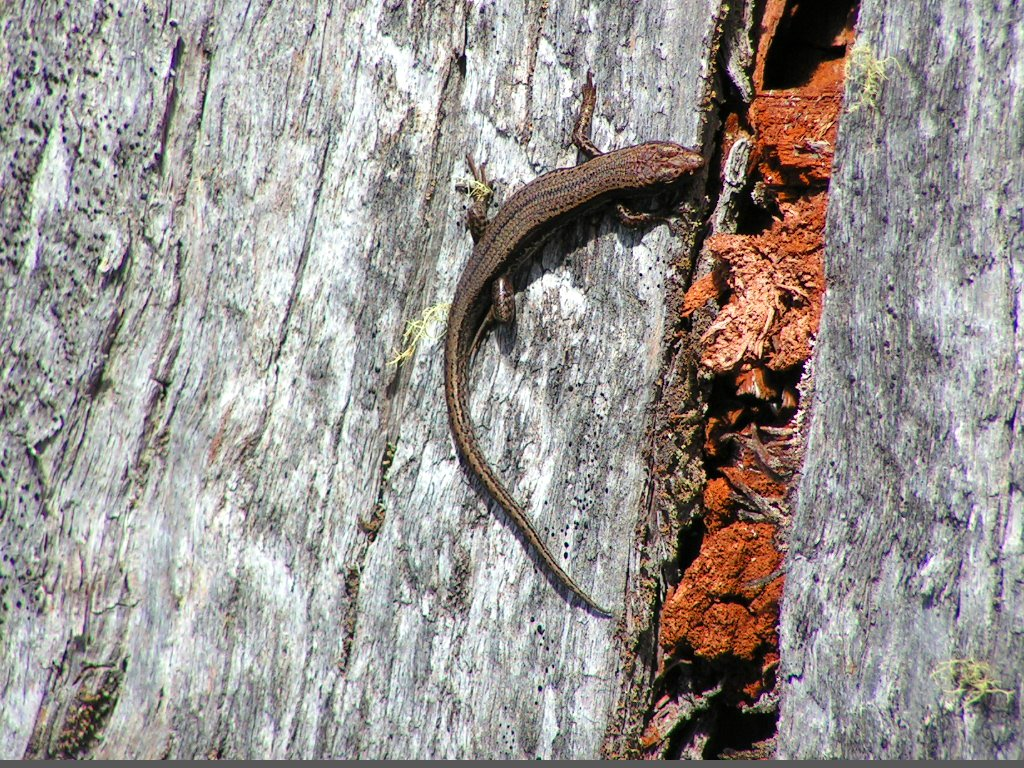
- Cradle Mountain, Tasmania

Scientific classification
- Kingdom: Animalia
- Phylum: Chordata
- Class: Reptilia
- Order: Squamata
- Family: Scincidae
- Genus: Carinascincus
- Species: C. pretiosus

Binomial name
- Carinascincus pretiosus (O'Shaughnessy, 1874)

Synonyms
- Mocoa pretiosa O'Shaughnessy, 1874; Leiolopisma pretiosum (O'Shaughnessy, 1874); Lygosoma pretiosa (O'Shaughnessy, 1874); Niveoscincus pretiosus (O'Shaughnessy, 1874)

= Tasmanian tree skink =

Species of lizard

The Tasmanian tree skink (Carinascincus pretiosus), also known commonly as the agile cool-skink, is a species of lizard in the subfamily Eugongylinae of the family Scincidae. The species is endemic to Tasmania and the Bass Strait islands. It is viviparous, and may be found in a wide variety of habitats, from tall forests to rocky coastlines.
