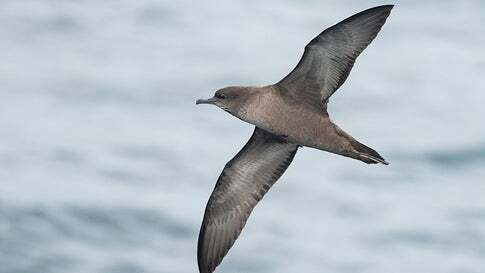

Conservation status
- Least Concern (IUCN 3.1)

Scientific classification
- Kingdom: Animalia
- Phylum: Chordata
- Class: Aves
- Order: Procellariiformes
- Family: Procellariidae
- Genus: Ardenna
- Species: A. tenuirostris

Binomial name
- Ardenna tenuirostris (Temminck, 1836)

Synonyms
- Puffinus tenuirostris

= Short-tailed shearwater =

Short-tailed shearwater, Slender-billed shearwater

Species of bird

The short-tailed shearwater or slender-billed shearwater (Ardenna tenuirostris), also called yula or moonbird, and commonly known as the muttonbird both in early Australia and in New Zealand, is the most abundant seabird species in Australian waters, and is one of the few Australian native birds in which the chicks are commercially harvested. It is a migratory species that breeds mainly on small islands in Bass Strait and Tasmania and migrates to the Northern Hemisphere for the boreal summer.

== Taxonomy ==
This shearwater appears to be related to the sooty and great shearwaters, which are also blunt-tailed, black-billed species, but its precise relationships are obscure (Austin, 1996; Austin et al., 2004). These are among the larger species of shearwater, which have been moved to a separate genus, Ardenna based on a phylogenetic analysis of mitochondrial DNA (Penhallurick & Wink, 2004).

== Ecology ==
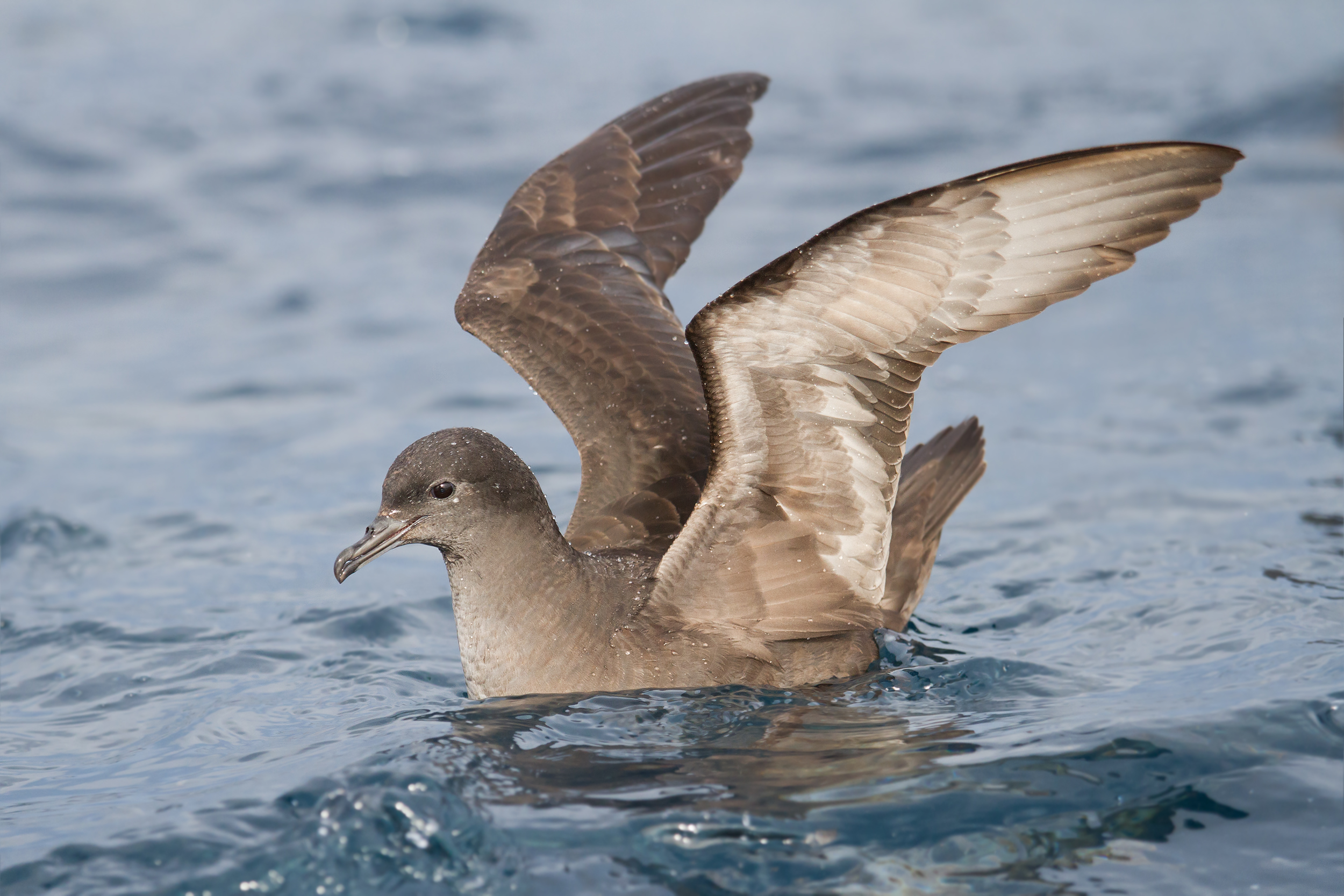

Each parent feeds the single chick for 2–3 days and then leaves for up to three weeks in search of food. These foraging trips can cover a distance of 1,500 km (930 mi) and mean the chick may be left unattended for over a week. When the chicks fledge they weigh around 900 g (2 lb), and may be heavier than their parents. In Tasmania, and especially on the muttonbird islands of the Furneaux Group, the chicks are harvested at this time for food and oil. The largest population in the world (2.8 million pairs - about 12% of the species) seems to be located on Babel Island. Adult birds foraging for food on the open ocean mistake plastic debris for food and then feed it to their chicks. This ingested plastic, as well as other factors, likely contribute to contamination of chicks. Thousands of Short-tailed shearwater fledglings are attracted to artificial lights during their maiden flights from nests to the open ocean. Fledglings are vulnerable to injury or death by collisions with human infrastructure and once grounded, to predation or becoming road casualties.

== Migration ==
Each austral winter, the shearwaters migrate to the seas off the Aleutian Islands and Kamchatka. In the austral spring, they travel down the coast of California before crossing the Pacific back to Australia.

In 2020, a long distance vagrant was found in Ireland. This marked the first confirmed sighting of the species in the Western Palearctic. It was taken to a rehabilitation center and subsequently died; it is now deposited at the Natural History Museum of Ireland.

== Harvest ==
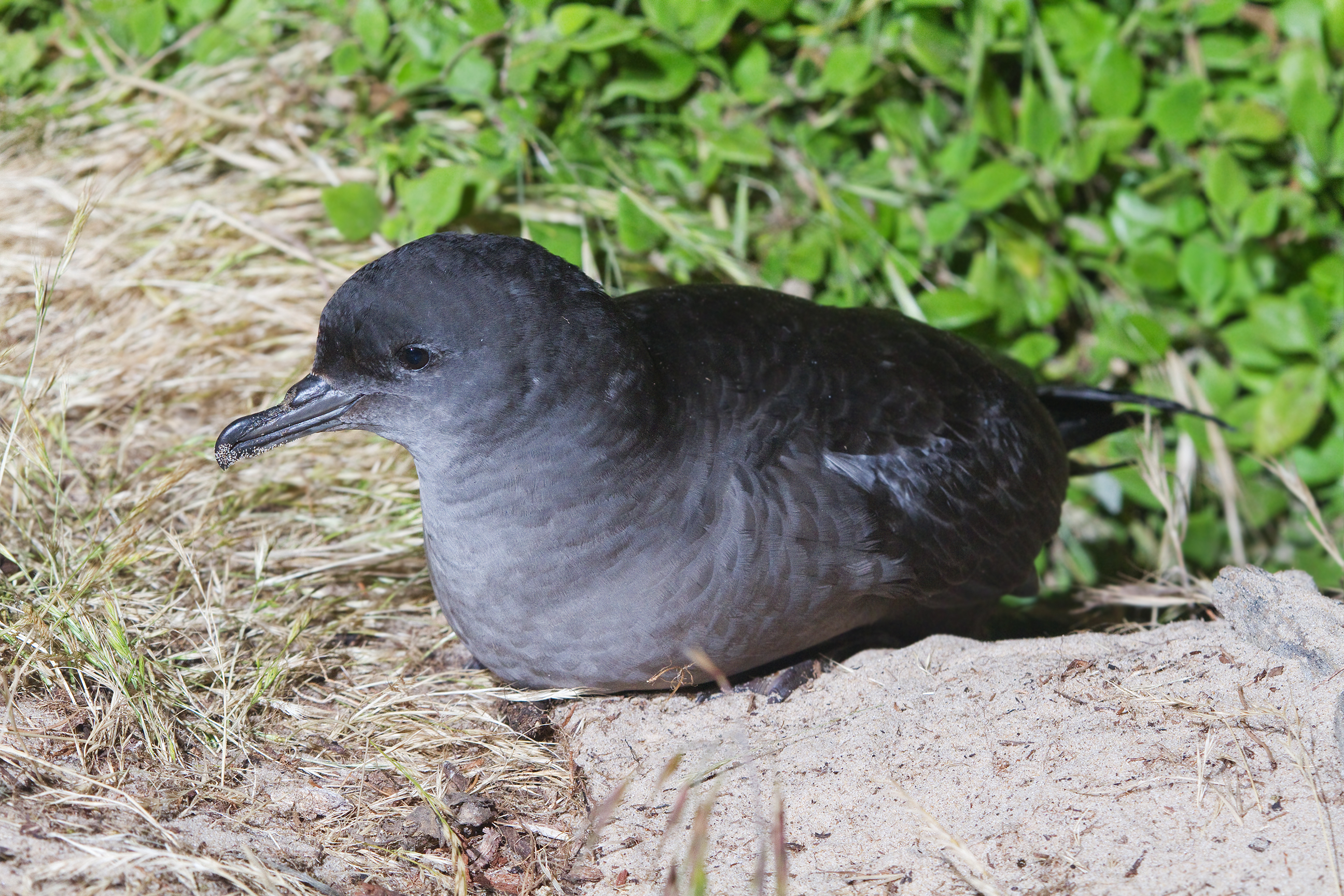
Adult near Burrow on Bruny Island. The photograph was taken at night.

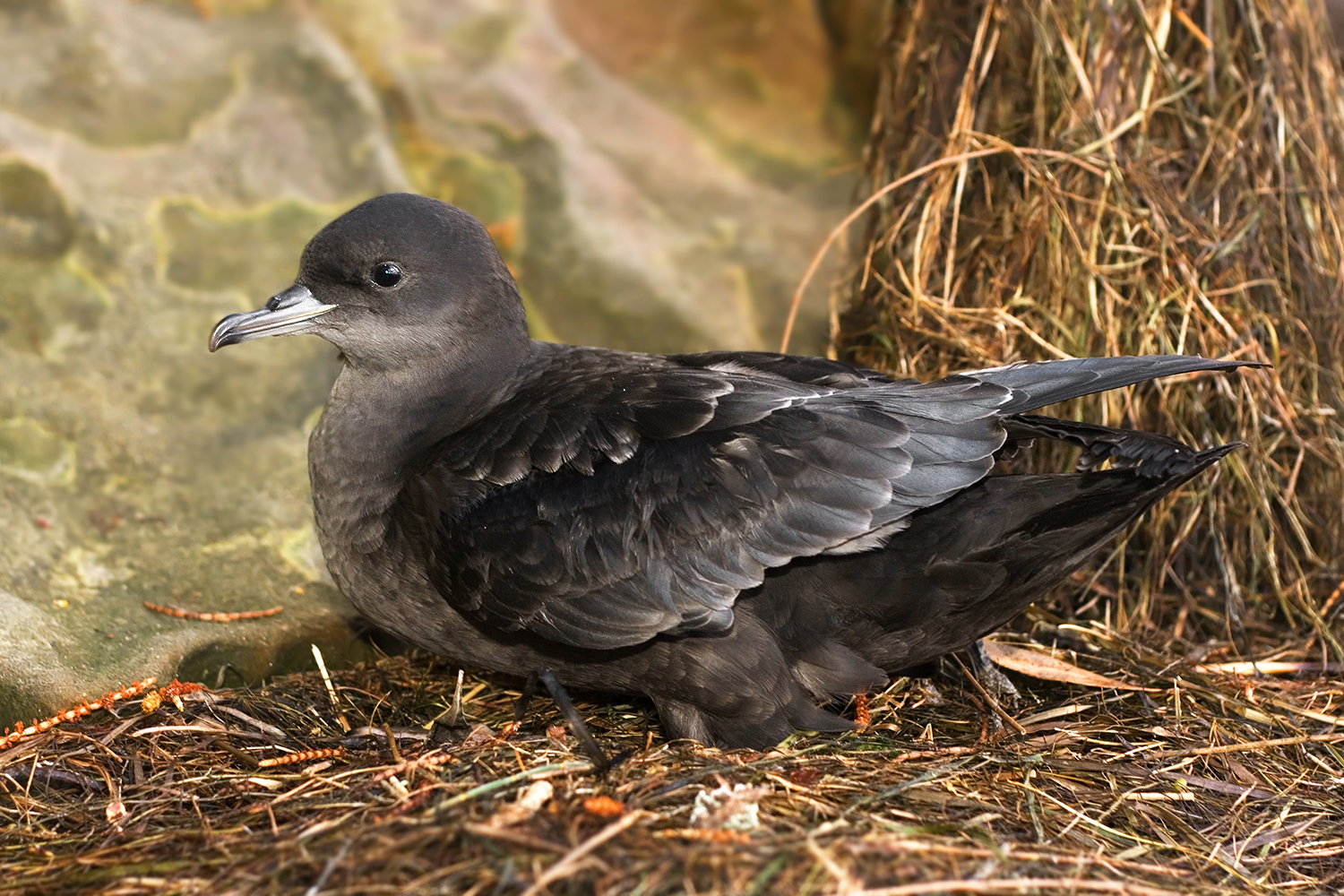
Fledgling, Austins Ferry, Tasmania, Australia

The practice of harvesting the various species of bird known as muttonbirds is known as muttonbirding. The name muttonbird was first used by the early settlers on Norfolk Island, who each year harvested adult providence petrels (Pterodroma solandri) for food. The petrels were similar to, but larger than the short-tailed shearwater. An officer in the Royal Marines called them "the flying sheep".

Aboriginal Tasmanians have harvested muttonbirds and their eggs for many generations, and a number of families continue this cultural practice. The muttonbird is one of the few Australian native birds that is commercially harvested. During the muttonbird season, chicks are taken for their feathers, flesh, and oil. The industry was established by early European sealers and their Aboriginal families. The recreational harvesting of short-tailed shearwaters is limited to the open season that is declared each year. A muttonbird licence must be obtained.
