= South East Cape =

Southernmost point of Australia when including Tasmania

- Cape
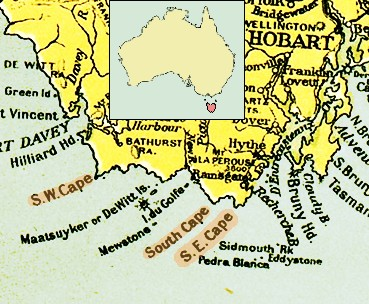
- 1916 map of the south coast of Tasmania, showing South East Cape

- Location within Tasmania
- Coordinates: 43°38′37″S 146°49′39″E
- Location: South Coast

UNESCO World Heritage Site
- Official name: Tasmanian Wilderness
- Location: Oceania
- Criteria: iii, iv, vi, vii, viii, ix, x
- Reference: 181
- Inscription: 1982 (6th Session)

South East Cape is a cape located at the southernmost point of the main island of Tasmania, the southernmost state in Australia. The cape is situated in the southern and south-eastern corner of the Southwest National Park, part of the Tasmanian Wilderness World Heritage Area, approximately 94 kilometres (58 mi) southwest of Hobart in Tasmania and about 65 kilometres (40 mi) east and slightly south of South West Cape. South East Cape marks the official dividing line between the Pacific and Indian Oceans.

== Location and features ==
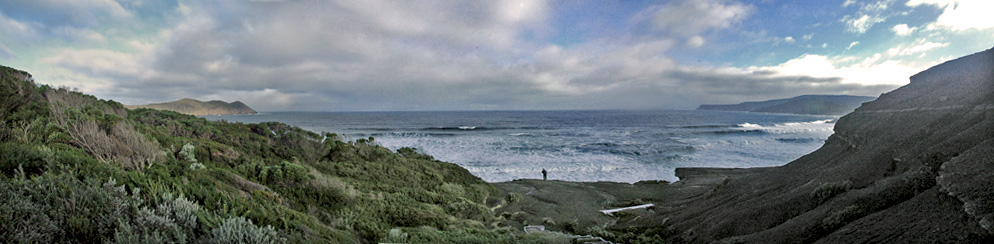
South East Cape from South Cape Bay

South East Cape is the southernmost point of the mainland of Tasmania but not of the state of Tasmania. The Maatsuyker Islands and the Pedra Branca island group, just offshore, are also part of the state of Tasmania and lie further south than South East Cape. The state of Tasmania also includes Macquarie Island, which is about 1,600 km SE of South East Cape.

South East Cape is one of the five southernmost capes that can be rounded by sailors in the earth's southern regions.

The cape is also a reference point for sectors of the southern coastline of Tasmania. Much sea traffic passes near it, and many ships and boats have been wrecked or grounded there.

== See also ==
- South West Cape
- South Coast Track
- Extreme points of Australia
