= South West Cape (Tasmania) =

Cape in Tasmania, Australia

- Cape
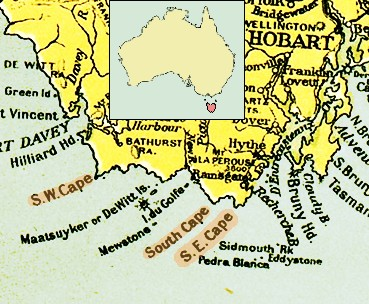
- 1916 map of the south coast of Tasmania, showing South West Cape.

- Location within Tasmania
- Coordinates: 43°34′12″S 146°01′48″E
- Location: South West Tasmania

UNESCO World Heritage Site
- Official name: Tasmanian Wilderness
- Location: Oceania
- Criteria: iii, iv, vi, vii, viii, ix, x
- Reference: 181
- Inscription: 1982 (6th Session)

South West Cape is a cape located at the south-west corner of Tasmania, Australia. The cape is situated in the south-western corner of the Southwest National Park, part of the Tasmanian Wilderness World Heritage Area, approximately 140 kilometres (87 mi) southwest of Hobart in Tasmania, and about 65 kilometres (40 mi) west and slightly north of South East Cape.

The cape is bound to the southeast and southwest by the Indian Ocean and is located south of Low Rocky Point and Point Hibbs.

The South West Cape Range provides a buffer between the cape and the inland wilderness area to the east and north, and the next range to the east is the Melaleuca Range. The high point of the southern end of the range, closest to the cape, is Mount Karamu at 439 metres (1,440 ft). The mount is named after the USS steam ship which foundered off the cape in 1925.

Wrecks and foundering of boats up to 500 kilometres (270 nmi; 310 mi) away in distance, are usually referred to this cape as an identification point, and mapping of the area usually uses the cape as a boundary between sections of the coast.

== See also ==
- South East Cape
- South Coast Track
