= List of birds of South Georgia and the South Sandwich Islands =

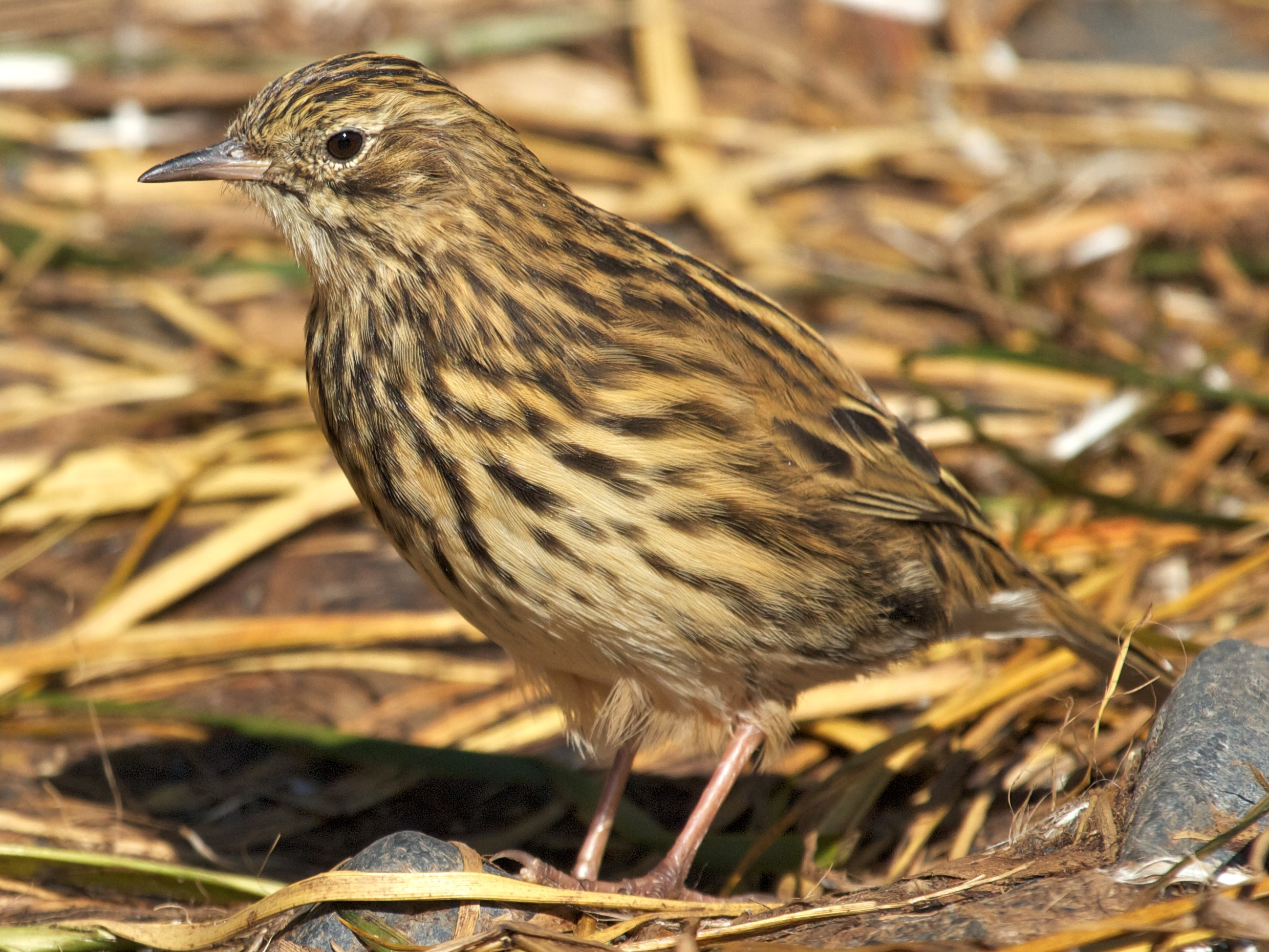
The South Georgia pipit is endemic to South Georgia Island

This is a list of the bird species recorded in South Georgia and the South Sandwich Islands. The avifauna of South Georgia and the South Sandwich Islands include a total of 100 confirmed species, of which two are endemic, one has been introduced by humans, and 45 are rare or vagrants.

The following tags have been used to highlight several categories of occurrence in addition to non-endemic resident species and regular visitors.

- (V) Vagrant - a species that rarely or accidentally occurs in South Georgia
- (E) Endemic - a species endemic to South Georgia
- (I) Introduced - a species introduced to South Georgia as a consequence, direct or indirect, of human actions

== Ducks ==
Order: Anseriformes Family: Anatidae

Anatidae includes the ducks and most duck-like waterfowl, such as geese and swans. These birds are adapted to an aquatic existence with webbed feet, flattened bills, and feathers that are excellent at shedding water due to an oily coating.

- Black-necked swan (Cygnus melancoryphus) (V)
- Upland goose (Chloephaga picta) (I)
- Blue-winged teal (Spatula discors) (V)
- Chiloe wigeon (Mareca sibilatrix) (V)
- Yellow-billed pintail (Anas georgica)
  - South Georgia pintail (Anas georgica georgica) (E)
- Yellow-billed teal (Anas flavirostris)

== Pigeons ==
Order: Columbiformes Family: Columbidae

Pigeons and doves are stout-bodied birds with short necks and short slender bills with a fleshy cere.

- Eared dove, Zenaida auriculata (V)

== Rails ==
Order: Gruiformes Family: Rallidae

Rallidae is a large family of small to medium-sized birds which includes the rails, crakes, coots, and gallinules. Typically they inhabit dense vegetation in damp environments near lakes, swamps, or rivers. In general they are shy and secretive birds, making them difficult to observe. Most species have strong legs and long toes which are well adapted to soft uneven surfaces. They tend to have short rounded wings and to be weak fliers.

- Allen's gallinule (Porphyrio alleni) (V)
- Purple gallinule, Porphyrio martinica (V)

== Plovers ==
Order: Charadriiformes Family: Charadriidae

The family Charadriidae includes the plovers, dotterels, and lapwings. They are small to medium-sized birds with compact bodies, short thick necks, and long, usually pointed, wings. They are found in open country worldwide, mostly in habitats near water.

- American golden plover (Pluvialis dominica) (V)
- Rufous-chested dotterel (Charadrius modestus) (V)

== Sheathbills ==
Order: Charadriiformes Family: Chionididae

The sheathbills are scavengers of the Antarctic regions. They have white plumage and look plump and dove-like but are believed to be similar to the ancestors of the modern gulls and terns.

- Snowy sheathbill, Chionis alba

== Sandpipers ==
Order: Charadriiformes Family: Scolopacidae

Scolopacidae is a large diverse family of small to medium-sized shorebirds including the sandpipers, curlews, godwits, shanks, tattlers, woodcocks, snipes, dowitchers, and phalaropes. The majority of these species eat small invertebrates picked out of the mud or soil. Variation in length of legs and bills enables multiple species to feed in the same habitat, particularly on the coast, without direct competition for food.

- Upland sandpiper (Bartramia longicauda) (V)
- Ruddy turnstone (Arenaria interpres) (V)
- Baird's sandpiper (Calidris bairdii) (V)
- Little stint (Calidris minuta) (V)
- Least sandpiper (Calidris minutilla) (V)
- White-rumped sandpiper (Calidris fuscicollis) (V)
- Pectoral sandpiper (Calidris melanotos) (V)
- Solitary sandpiper (Tringa solitaria) (V)
- Wilson's phalarope (Steganopus tricolor) (V)

== Skuas ==
Order: Charadriiformes Family: Stercorariidae

The family Stercorariidae are, in general, medium to large birds, typically with gray or brown plumage, often with white markings on the wings. They nest on the ground in temperate and arctic regions and are long-distance migrants.

- Long-tailed jaeger (Stercorarius longicaudus) (V)
- Pomarine jaeger (Stercorarius pomarinus) (V)
- South Polar skua (Stercorarius maccormicki)
- Brown skua (Stercorarius antarcticus)
- Chilean skua (Stercorarius chilensis)

== Gulls and Terns ==
Order: Charadriiformes Family: Laridae

Laridae is a family of medium to large seabirds and includes gulls, kittiwakes, and terns. Gulls are typically gray or white, often with black markings on the head or wings. They have longish bills and webbed feet. Terns are a group of generally medium to large seabirds typically with gray or white plumage, often with black markings on the head. Most terns hunt fish by diving but some pick insects off the surface of fresh water. Terns are generally long-lived birds, with several species known to live in excess of 30 years.

- Brown-hooded gull (Chroicocephalus maculipennis) (V)
- Dolphin gull (Leucophaeus scoresbii) (V)
- Olrog's gull (Larus atlanticus) (V)
- Kelp gull (Larus dominicanus)
- Arctic tern (Sterna paradisaea)
- Antarctic tern (Sterna vittata)

== Penguins ==
Order: Sphenisciformes Family: Spheniscidae

The penguins are a group of flightless aquatic birds living almost exclusively in the Southern Hemisphere. Most penguins feed on krill, fish, squid, and other forms of sealife caught while swimming underwater.

- King penguin (Aptenodytes patagonicus)
- Emperor penguin (Aptenodytes forsteri) (V)
- Gentoo penguin (Pygoscelis papua)
- Adelie penguin (Pygoscelis adeliae)
- Chinstrap penguin (Pygoscelis antarcticus)
- Macaroni penguin (Eudyptes chrysolophus)
- Southern rockhopper penguin (Eudyptes chrysocome)
- Magellanic penguin (Spheniscus magellanicus) (V)

== Albatrosses ==
Order: Procellariiformes Family: Diomedeidae

The albatrosses are among the largest of flying birds, and the great albatrosses from the genus Diomedea have the largest wingspans of any extant birds.

- Northern royal albatross (Diomedea sanfordi)
- Southern royal albatross (Diomedea epomophora)
- Snowy albatross (Diomedea exulans)
- Tristan albatross (Diomedea dabbenena) (V)
- Antipodean albatross (Diomedea antipodensis)
- Sooty albatross (Phoebetria fusca)
- Light-mantled albatross (Phoebetria palpebrata)
- Atlantic yellow-nosed albatross (Thalassarche chlororhynchos)
- Grey-headed albatross (Thalassarche chrysostoma)
- Black-browed albatross (Thalassarche melanophris)
- Shy albatross (Thalassarche cauta)

== Southern storm-petrels ==
Order: Procellariiformes Family: Oceanitidae

The storm-petrels are the smallest seabirds, relatives of the petrels, feeding on planktonic crustaceans and small fish picked from the surface, typically while hovering. The flight is fluttering and sometimes bat-like. Until 2018, this family's species were included with the other storm-petrels in family Hydrobatidae.

- Wilson's storm-petrel (Oceanites oceanicus)
- Grey-backed storm-petrel (Garrodia nereis)
- White-faced storm-petrel (Pelagodroma marina)
- White-bellied storm-petrel (Fregetta grallaria)
- Black-bellied storm-petrel (Fregetta tropica)

== Shearwaters, Petrels, and Prions ==
Order: Procellariiformes Family: Procellariidae

The procellariids are the main group of medium-sized "true petrels", characterized by united nostrils with medium septum and a long outer functional primary.

- Northern giant petrel (Macronectes halli)
- Southern giant petrel (Macronectes giganteus)
- Southern fulmar (Fulmarus glacialoides)
- Antarctic petrel (Thalassoica antarctica)
- Pintado petrel (Daption capense)
- Snow petrel (Pagodroma nivea)
- Blue petrel (Halobaena caerulea)
- Broad-billed prion (Pachyptila vittata)
- Salvin's prion (Pachyptila salvini)
- Antarctic prion (Pachyptila desolata)
- Slender-billed prion (Pachyptila belcheri)
- Fairy prion (Pachyptila turtur)
- MacGillivray's prion (Pachyptila macgillivrayi) (V)
- Fulmar prion (Pachyptila crassirostris)
- Kerguelen petrel (Aphrodroma brevirostris)
- Soft-plumaged petrel (Pterodroma mollis)
- Atlantic petrel (Pterodroma incerta)
- White-headed petrel (Pterodroma lessonii)
- Great-winged petrel (Pterodroma macroptera)
- Grey petrel (Procellaria cinerea)
- White-chinned petrel (Procellaria aequinoctialis)
- Westland petrel (Procellaria westlandica) (V)
- Sooty shearwater (Ardenna grisea)
- Great shearwater (Ardenna gravis)
- Flesh-footed shearwater (Ardenna carneipes)
- Manx shearwater (Puffinus puffinus) (V)
- Little shearwater (Puffinus assimilis)
- Subantarctic shearwater (Puffinus elegans)
- Magellanic diving petrel (Pelecanoides magellani) (V)
- South Georgia diving petrel (Pelecanoides georgicus)
- Common diving petrel (Pelecanoides urinatrix)

== Northern storm-petrels ==
Order: Procellariiformes Family: Hydrobatidae

Though the members of this family are similar in many respects to the southern storm-petrels, including their general appearance and habits, there are enough genetic differences to warrant their placement in a separate family.

- Leach's storm-petrel, Hydrobates leucorhous (V)

== Cormorants ==
Order: Suliformes Family: Phalacrocoracidae

Phalacrocoracidae is a family of medium to large coastal, fish-eating seabirds that includes cormorants and shags. Plumage coloration varies, with the majority having mainly dark plumage, some species being black-and-white, and a few being colorful.

- South Georgia shag (Leucocarbo georgianus) (E)

== Herons ==
Order: Pelecaniformes Family: Ardeidae

The family Ardeidae contains the bitterns, herons, and egrets. Herons and egrets are medium to large wading birds with long necks and legs. Bitterns tend to be shorter necked and more wary. Members of Ardeidae fly with their necks retracted, unlike other long-necked birds such as storks, ibises and spoonbills.

- Western cattle egret (Ardea ibis) (V)
- Great egret (Ardea alba) (V)
- Snowy egret (Egretta thula) (V)

== Barn owls ==
Order: Strigiformes Family: Tytonidae

Barn owls are medium to large owls with large heads and characteristic heart-shaped faces. They have long strong legs with powerful talons.

- American barn-owl, Tyto furcata (V)

== Falcons ==
Order: Falconiformes Family: Falconidae

Falconidae is a family of diurnal birds of prey. They differ from hawks, eagles, and kites in that they kill with their beaks instead of their talons.

- Peregrine falcon, Falco peregrinus (V)

== Tyrant flycatchers ==
Order: Passeriformes Family: Tyrannidae

Tyrant flycatchers are passerine birds which occur throughout North and South America. They superficially resemble the Old World flycatchers, but are more robust and have stronger bills. They do not have the sophisticated vocal capabilities of the songbirds. Most, but not all, have plain coloring. As the name implies, most are insectivorous.

- White-crested elaenia (Elaenia albiceps) (V)
- Eastern kingbird (Tyrannus tyrannus) (V)
- Austral negrito (Lessonia rufa) (V)
- Dark-faced ground tyrant (Muscisaxicola maclovianus) (V)

== Swallows ==
Order: Passeriformes Family: Hirundinidae

The family Hirundinidae is adapted to aerial feeding. They have a slender streamlined body, long pointed wings, and a short bill with a wide gape. The feet are adapted to perching rather than walking, and the front toes are partially joined at the base.

- Western house martin (Delichon urbicum) (V)
- Cliff swallow (Petrochelidon pyrrhonota) (V)
- Barn swallow (Hirundo rustica) (V)
- Chilean swallow (Tachycineta leucopyga) (V)

== Old World sparrows ==
Order: Passeriformes Family: Passeridae

Sparrows are small passerine birds. In general, sparrows tend to be small, plump, brown or gray birds with short tails and short powerful beaks. Sparrows are seed eaters, but they also consume small insects.

- House sparrow, Passer domesticus (I)(V)

== Pipits and wagtails ==
Order: Passeriformes Family: Motacillidae

Motacillidae is a family of small passerine birds with medium to long tails which includes the wagtails, longclaws, and pipits. They are slender ground-feeding insectivores of open country.

- South Georgia pipit (Anthus antarcticus) (E)

== Icterids ==
Order: Passeriformes Family: Icteridae

The icterids are a group of small to medium-sized, often colorful, passerine birds restricted to the New World and include the grackles, New World blackbirds, and New World orioles. Most species have black as the predominant plumage color, often enlivened by yellow, orange, or red.

- Long-tailed meadowlark, Leistes loyca (V)

== See also ==
- List of birds
- Lists of birds by region
