= Atlantic: The Wildest Ocean on Earth =

- Also known as: Wild Atlantic
- Genre: Nature documentary
- Narrated by: Cillian Murphy
- Composer: Barnaby Taylor
- Country of origin: United Kingdom
- Original language: English
- No. of episodes: 3

Production
- Executive producers: Tim Martin; Tim Scoones
- Producer: Dan Rees
- Running time: 59-60 minutes
- Production companies: BBC Natural History Unit; National Geographic Channel; WDR

Original release
- Network: BBC Two; BBC Two HD
- Release: 30 July – 13 August 2015

Atlantic: The Wildest Ocean on Earth (also known as Wild Atlantic for European release) is a three-part BBC nature documentary series exploring the natural history of the Atlantic Ocean. It was first broadcast on BBC Two and BBC Two HD in the United Kingdom. A ten-minute making-of feature Atlantic Diaries airs at the end of each episode, taking the total running time to 60 minutes. In English speaking territories the show is narrated by Irish actor Cillian Murphy. The series will broadcast internationally on BBC Earth.

== Episodes ==
Episode	Title	Original release date
1	"Life Stream"	30 July 2015
Humpback whale lunging in the center of a bubble net spiral Animals: Herring · Humpback whale · Fin whale · Killer whale · Bluefin tuna · Swordfish · Marlin · Sailfish · Dolphin · Horse · Harp seal · Lion's mane jellyfish · Leatherback sea turtle · Sand eel · Northern gannet · Haddock · Cod · Basking shark · Atlantic puffin · Sprat · Pink sea fan · Common cuttlefish
2	"Mountains of the Deep"	6 August 2015
Half a million penguins nest on the beaches of South Georgia, just one of eighty-seven species of bird that live on the island Animals: Blue jack mackerel · Common dolphin · Atlantic spotted dolphin · Shearwater · Sea fan · Sponge · Soft coral · Anglerfish · Squid · Octopus · Sixgill shark · Decorator crab · Comb jelly · Krill · Histioteuthis · Barracuda · Mobula · Blue shark · Sperm whale · Black triggerfish · Ascension land crab · Mole crab · Red-footed booby · Fairy tern · Black noddy · Spinner dolphin · Tiger shark · Wandering albatross · Hoff crab · Chinstrap penguin · Saffron sea cucumber · Lobster krill · Gentoo penguin · South American sea lion · Commerson's dolphin · Humpback whale · King penguin · Elephant seal · South Georgia pintail · Imperial shag
3	"From Heaven to Hell"	13 August 2015
