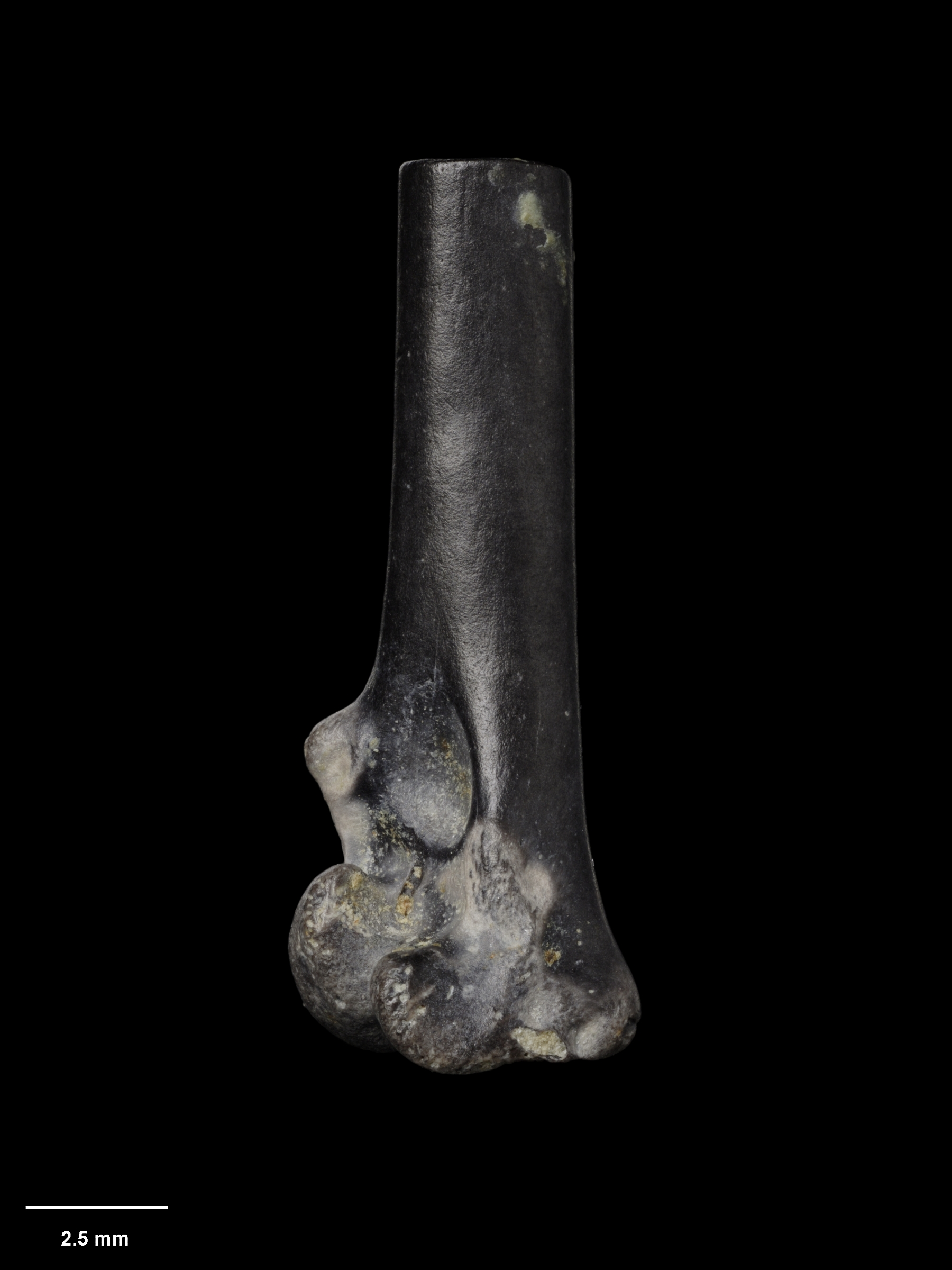
- Humerus fossil of the species holotype

Scientific classification
- Kingdom: Animalia
- Phylum: Chordata
- Class: Aves
- Order: Procellariiformes
- Family: Procellariidae
- Genus: Pelecanoides
- Species: P. miokuaka

Binomial name
- Pelecanoides miokuaka Worthy et al., 2007

= Pelecanoides miokuaka =

Extinct species of bird

Pelecanoides miokuaka is an extinct species of diving petrel of New Zealand. Described in 2007, it is known only from a single humerus bone that was discovered from early Miocene sediments of the Manuherikia Group.

== Taxonomy ==
The bone, a humerus, was discovered in a cliff at Mata Creek, in Otago, New Zealand. It was collected on 5 September 2002 by Trevor Worthy and Alan Tennyson. This location represents early Miocene (19–16 mya) sediments of the Manuherikia Group. Several characteristics of the bone identify it as a diving petrel: the flattened shaft, the proximal origin of the dorsal condyle, the short and blunt supracondylaris process, the shallow fossa m. brachialis, and the elongated epicondylaris venralis. The species epithet miokuaka combines the words "miocene" and kuaka, the Maori word for diving petrels. It has been given the common name of Miocene diving petrel.

== Description ==
The humerus has a maximum distal width (through the condyles) of 6.4 millimetres, with a shaft width at the proximal side of the dorsal supracondylar process of 3.6 millimetres. It is similar in size to the South Georgia diving petrel (Pelecanoides georgicus), and slightly smaller than the common diving petrel (Pelecanoides urinatrix). Several characteristics distinguish it from these and all other Pelecanoides species. Within the brachial fossa, the impression of its musculus brachialis anticus is deeper, and extends dorsally to the base of the dorsal supracondylar process. The ventral condyle is not linked to the ventral supracondylar tubercle by a ridge; as a result, the facies between the ventral supracondylar tubercle and the ventral condyle are flat rather than housing a broad fossa, and the ventral epicondyle has smaller ligamental attachment points and is smaller than other Pelecanoides.
