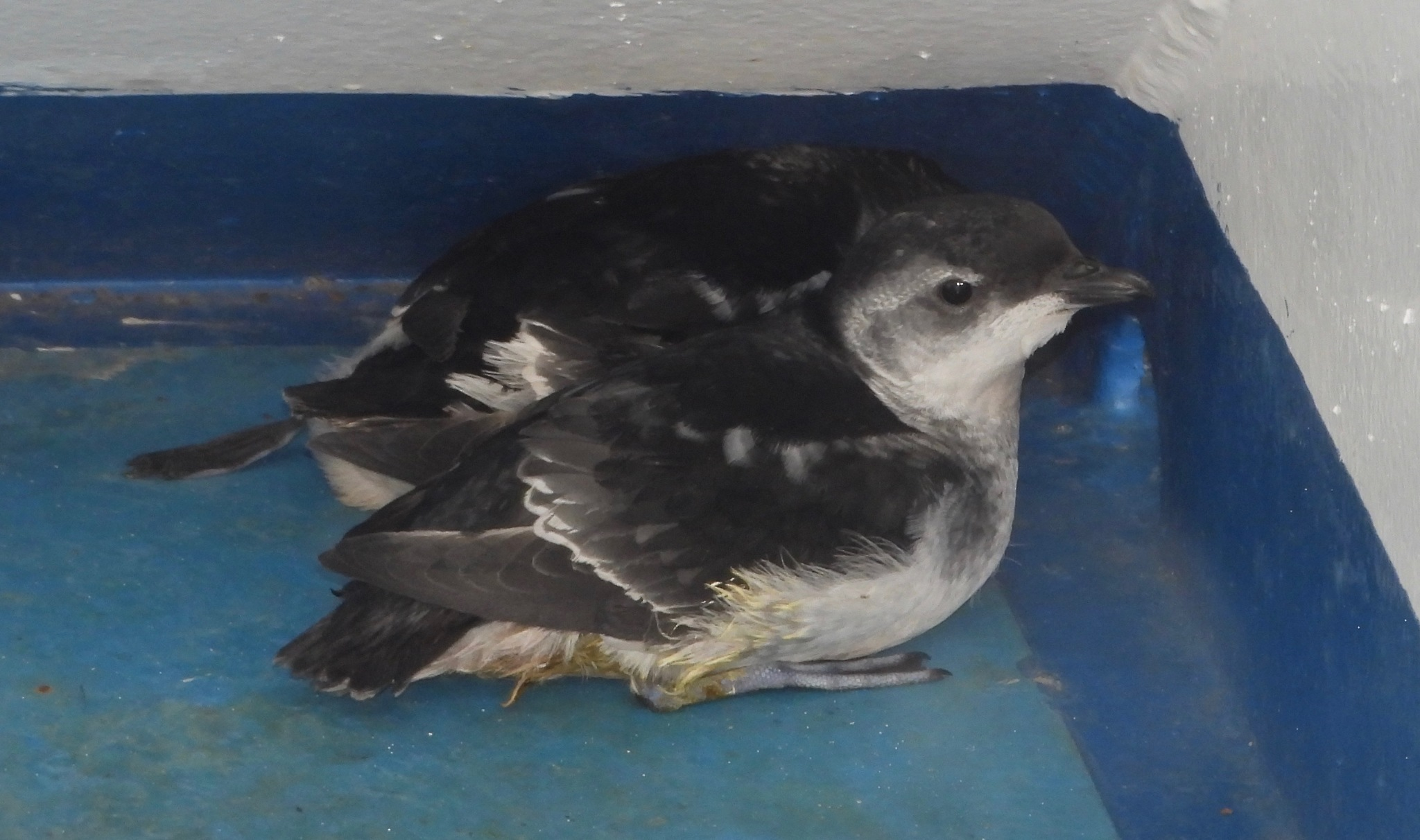

Conservation status
- Least Concern (IUCN 3.1)

Scientific classification
- Kingdom: Animalia
- Phylum: Chordata
- Class: Aves
- Order: Procellariiformes
- Family: Procellariidae
- Genus: Pelecanoides
- Species: P. magellani

Binomial name
- Pelecanoides magellani (Mathews, 1912)
- Distribution of P. magellani

= Magellanic diving petrel =

Species of bird

The Magellanic diving petrel (Pelecanoides magellani) is a species of diving petrel, one of five very similar, small, auk-like petrels found exclusively in the southern oceans. It is one of the smaller species of diving petrels, though size differences are seemingly indistinguishable between species unless seen up close. It is probably the least known of all five species.

== Taxonomy ==
The Magellanic diving petrel was formally described in 1912 by the Australian born ornithologist Gregory Mathews as a subspecies of the Peruvian diving petrel with the trinomial name Pelecanoides garnotii magellani. It is now considered as a separate species with the binomial name Pelecanoides magellani. The genus name combines the Ancient Greek pelekan meaning "pelican" and "-oidēs" meaning "resembling". The specific epithet magellani refers to the Straits of Magellan. The species is monotypic: no subspecies are recognised.

According to HBW, this species is more closely related to the South Georgian and Peruvian diving petrels. The diving petrels bear strong resemblances to the smaller auk species (i.e. the Dovekie or Little Auk), though they are not closely related. This likeness is a prime example of convergent evolution, since the two have similar niches in their ecosystem, therefore they have evolved similar traits.

== Description ==
This short, compact petrel ranges from 19 to 22 cm (7.5 to 8.7 in) in length, and weighs anywhere between 5 and 6 oz (males are typically heavier than females). The head of P. magellani is black, bordered by a contrasting white that leads into a distinctive white crescent extending up towards the back of the neck. The rest of the body follows a strong penguin-like black above, white below scheme, with some white streaks around the sides of the nape and on the scapulars. They also have some blackish-grey mottling on the flank region and sometimes on the sides of the breast. The upperwing is mostly black, with white edges on the secondaries; the underwing coverts are white (with some fragments of black on the "arm"), while the underside of the flight feathers are light grey. The tail feathers (rectrices) are mostly black above (but may appear brown in some lighting) with nearly invisible white tips, and mainly white to a very light grey below. The bill is mostly black, as well as the upward-facing nostrils (which are unique only to the diving petrels), the legs and feet are a light slate-blue to light blue with black-brownish webs, and black claws, and the eyes are a very dark brown color. It only overlaps with the Peruvian diving petrel, P. garnotii, but the two are distinguishable by the visible white crescent of the Magellanic vs. the nearly all-black head of the Peruvian.

== Distribution and habitat ==
The Magellanic diving petrel breeds on vegetated slopes on coastal and nearshore islands, typically in fjords and channels, in southern Chile, Argentina, and Tierra del Fuego and forages in offshore and inshore waters in the area.

== Behavior and ecology ==
=== Feeding ===
Being the most elusive of the Pelecanoides species, not much is known about the ecology of the Magellanic diving petrel. Like all diving petrel species, P. magellani is a strong swimmer capable of performing dives of over 10 ft to pursue prey, staying submerged anywhere from 10 seconds to potentially over a minute. The birds usual dive from the surface, though are capable of dropping a few feet from the air into the ocean. They move through the water by propelling themselves with their wings and steering with their tails and feet. The prey of P. magellani is shown to consist of small crustaceans, aquatic invertebrates like copepods, amphipods, and plankton, and perhaps small fish could be in their diet as well. They likely carry food back to their chicks via their gular pouches then regurgitating food through them.

=== Breeding ===
Breeding habits of the Magellanic diving petrel are little known. It is known that eggs are laid from November to December, and fledglings have been spotted in March. Like its congeners, P. magellani nests in burrows in dense colonies on coastal islands. They lay one egg and are most likely monogamous like other Procellariiformes. Both parents take shifts between incubation and going out to sea to feed during the incubation period, and both take turns feeding their chick, which will reach sexual maturity anywhere from 2–3 years of age. After raising their offspring, the adults go into what is called post-nuptial moult, where they shed old feathers to grow fresh feathers, most notably their flight feathers. During this time, for all Pelecanoides species, they become flightless until their feathers have been fully replaced.

== Status and conservation ==
The Magellanic diving petrel is considered as Least Concern on the IUCN Red List. Their population is estimated anywhere from 6,700 to 330,000 individuals; they are under no immediate threat, but are presumed to be affected by invasive species (i.e. rats or mice) and human activity, namely periodic guano harvests, could be a threat. However, the species is not well-known, and extensive research is required to evaluate current population trends and new threats.
