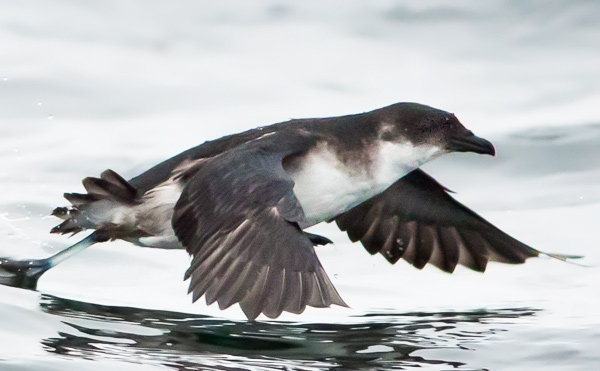
- fledgling

Conservation status
- Near Threatened (IUCN 3.1)

Scientific classification
- Kingdom: Animalia
- Phylum: Chordata
- Class: Aves
- Order: Procellariiformes
- Family: Procellariidae
- Genus: Pelecanoides
- Species: P. garnotii

Binomial name
- Pelecanoides garnotii (Lesson, RP & Garnot, 1828)

= Peruvian diving petrel =

Species of bird

The Peruvian diving petrel (Pelecanoides garnotii) (local name in Peru: potoyunco) is a small seabird that feeds in offshore waters in the Humboldt Current off Peru and Chile.

== Taxonomy ==
The Peruvian diving petrel was formally described in 1828 by the French naturalists René Lesson and Prosper Garnot under the binomial name Puffinuria garnotti. In his book Manuel d'ornithologie Lesson quotes the text of a description written by Garnot. The Peruvian diving petrel is now placed in the genus Pelecanoides was originally introduced in 1799 by the French naturalist Bernard Germain de Lacépède for the common diving petrel. The species is monotypic: no subspecies are recognised.

== Description ==
Peruvian diving petrel is 20–24 cm (7.9–9.4 in) in overall length. Like the rest of the diving petrels it is a nondescript bird, with a dark back and pale belly, and blue feet, and can be separated from the rest of its family only by differences in its beak and nostrils.

== Behaviour ==
=== Food and feeding ===
Unlike the common diving petrel and the South Georgia diving petrel it feeds in cold, offshore, often pelagic water, obtaining small fish larvae and planktonic crustaceans by pursuit diving. The main part of his food is made up by plankton organisms (85.3-91.1%). The remaining percentage of the Peruvian diving petrel's food is fish, mainly anchovies. Peruvian diving petrels can dive up to 83 metres (270 ft) deep but the average depth was recorded at around 30 metres (100 ft). It was long thought that the Peruvian diving petrel was rather bad in flying. However, great numbers of birds have been observed fishing regularly in the area between Asia Island and Pachacamac Island at a distance of 150-200 kilometres north of their Peruvian breeding grounds.

== Conservation status ==
The Peruvian diving petrel has become locally extinct on many of its former colonies and now nests only on a few offshore islands. A total population of 12,216 breeding pairs was estimated for San Gallán and La Vieja Islands in Peru, with some small additional breeding colonies reported for Corcovado Island in Peru, as well as Pan de Azucar Island, Choros islands, Grande and Pajaros islands in Chile. They breed year round, laying a single egg in a burrow dug into guano.

Peruvian diving petrels are considered Near Threatened. They formerly numbered in the millions, but the pressures of guano extraction (which destroyed nests, eggs and chicks), and being directly taken for food by guano workers and introduced species (particularly foxes and feral cats), have caused the number to crash. Although all of the Peruvian breeding sites are located in protected areas (Paracas National Reserve and Guano Islands National Reserve) some guano extraction still continues and the reserves are ineffectively policed.
