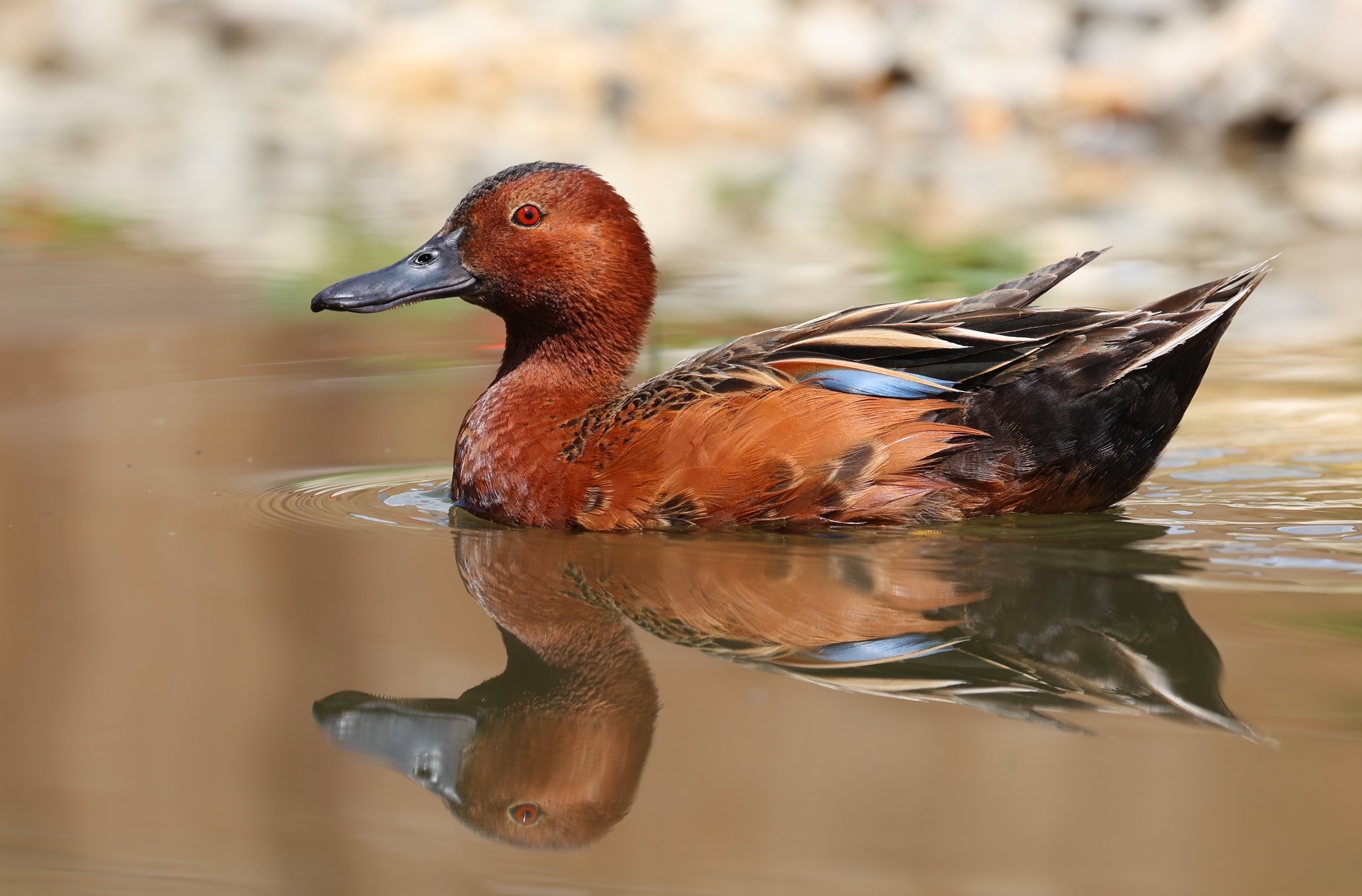
- Male
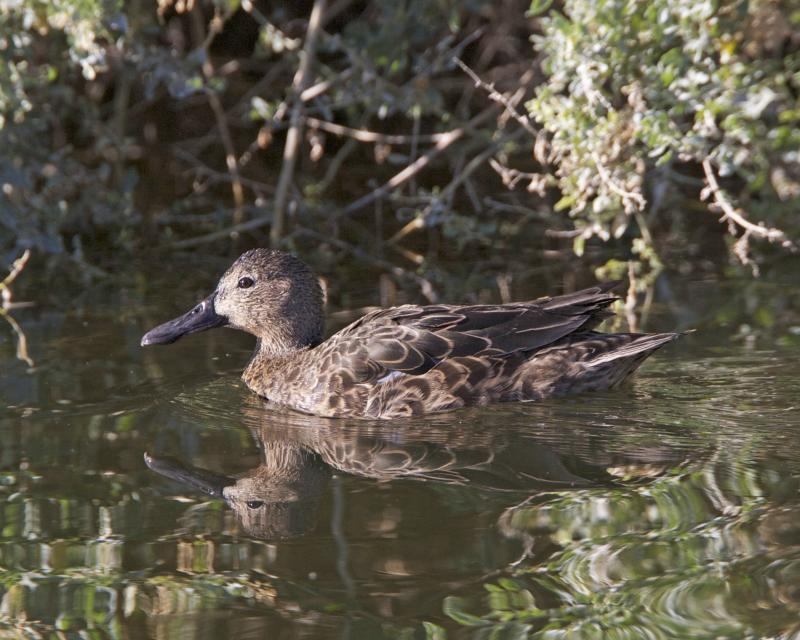
- Female

Conservation status
- Least Concern (IUCN 3.1)

Scientific classification
- Kingdom: Animalia
- Phylum: Chordata
- Class: Aves
- Order: Anseriformes
- Family: Anatidae
- Genus: Spatula
- Species: S. cyanoptera

Binomial name
- Spatula cyanoptera (Vieillot, 1816)

Subspecies
- 4 living, 1 possibly extinct; see text
- Breeding Migration Year-round Nonbreeding

Synonyms
- Anas cyanoptera Vieillot, 1816

= Cinnamon teal =

Species of bird

The cinnamon teal (Spatula cyanoptera) is a species of duck found in western North and South America. It is a small dabbling duck, with bright reddish plumage on the male and duller brown plumage on the female. It lives in marshes and ponds, and feeds mostly on plants.

== Description ==
The adult male has a cinnamon-red head and body with a brown back, a red eye and a dark bill. The adult female has a mottled brown body, a pale brown head, brown eyes and a grey bill and is very similar in appearance to a female blue-winged teal; however, its overall color is richer, the lores, eye line, and eye ring are less distinct. Its bill is longer and more spatulate. Male juvenile resembles a female cinnamon or blue-winged teal but their eyes are red. They are 16 in (41 cm) long, have a 22-inch (560 mm) wingspan, and weigh 14 oz (400 g). They have 2 adult molts per year and a third molt in their first year.

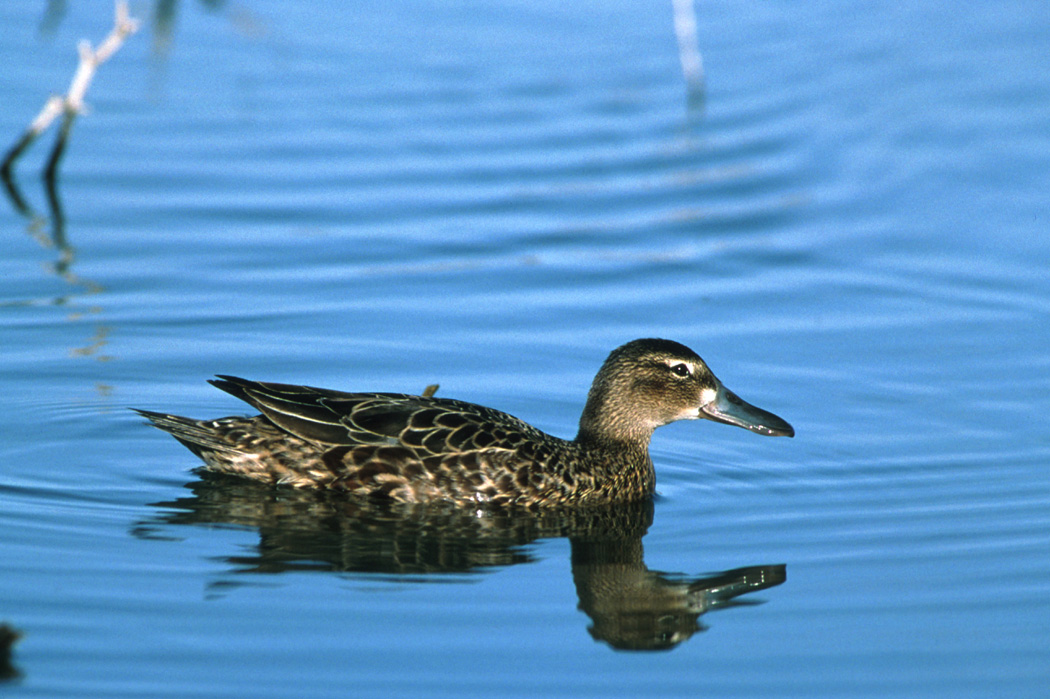
Female Spatula cyanoptera septentrionalium

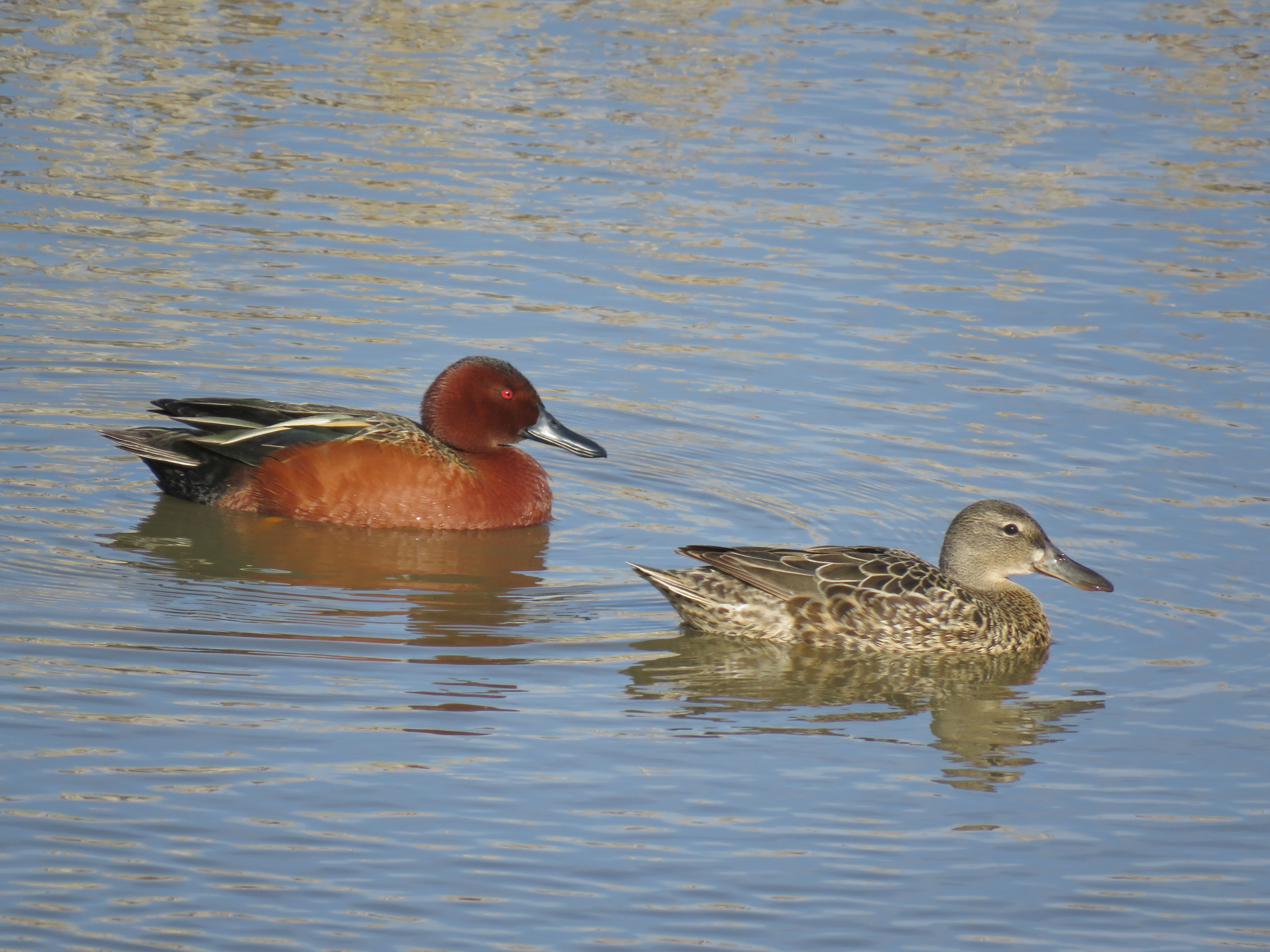
Male (left) and female

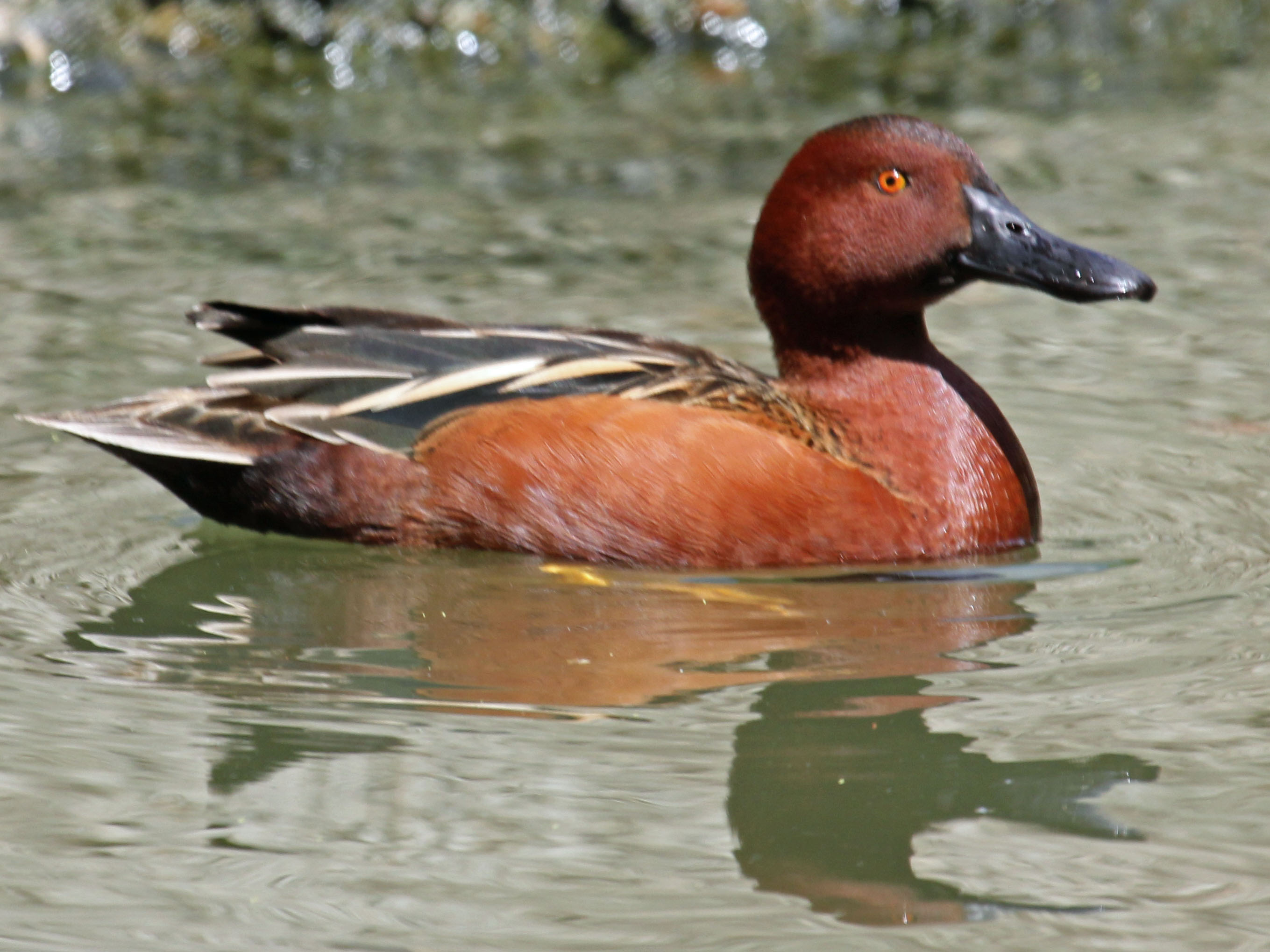
Male

== Distribution ==
Their breeding habitat is marshes and ponds in western United States and extreme southwestern Canada, and are rare visitors to the eastern United States. One young male duck was spotted in Grimsby, Ontario, and became a tourist attraction due to its rarity outside of western Canada. Cinnamon teal generally select new mates each year. They are migratory and most winter in northern South America and the Caribbean, generally not migrating as far as the blue-winged teal. Some winter in California and southwestern Arizona. Two subspecies of cinnamon teal reside within the Andes of South America. The smaller S. c. cyanoptera is widespread within low elevations (<1000m) such as the coast of Peru and southern Argentina, whereas the larger subspecies S. c. orinomus occupies elevations of 3500–4600 meters in the central Andes.

== Behavior ==
Cinnamon teal are dabbling ducks, taking most of their food at or near the surface of a body of water; a breeding population studied in Arizona ate primarily seeds (especially Carex sp.), aquatic fly larvae, and snails. They mainly eat plants; their diet may also include molluscs and aquatic insects. They can also feed like northern shovelers, following each other in tight groups as they slowly feed across an area.

Each clutch consists of 4 to 16 creamy white colored eggs, measuring 4.4–5 cm (1.7–2 in) in length and 3.33–3.5 cm (1.3–1.4 in) in width.

== Taxonomy ==
They are known to interbreed with blue-winged teals, which are very close relatives.

Subspecies are:

- S. c. septentrionalium (Oberholser, 1906) northern cinnamon teal breeds from British Columbia to northwestern New Mexico, and they winter in northwestern South America.
- S. c. tropica (Snyder & Lumsden, 1951) tropical cinnamon teal occurs in the Cauca Valley and Magdalena Valley in Colombia.
- S. c. borreroi (Snyder & Lumsden, 1951) Borrero's cinnamon teal (possibly extinct) occurs in the eastern Andes of Colombia with records of apparently resident birds from northern Ecuador. It is named for Colombian ornithologist José Ignacio Borrero.
- S. c. orinoma (Snyder & Lumsden, 1951) Andean cinnamon teal occurs in the Altiplano of Peru, northern Chile and Bolivia.
- S. c. cyanoptera (Vieillot, 1816) Argentine cinnamon teal occurs in southern Peru, southern Brazil, Argentina, Chile, and the Falkland Islands.

== Works cited ==
- Clements, James (2007). The Clements Checklist of the Birds of the World. Ithaca, NY: Cornell University Press
- Dunn, J. & Alderfer, J. (2006) National Geographic Field Guide to the Birds of North America 5th ed.
- Floyd, T (2008) Smithsonian Field Guide to the Birds of North America. New York: HarperCollins.
- Herrera, Néstor; Rivera, Roberto; Ibarra Portillo, Ricardo & Rodríguez, Wilfredo (2006). "Nuevos registros para la avifauna de El Salvador" ("New records for the avifauna of El Salvador") (Spanish with English abstract). Boletín de la Sociedad Antioqueña de Ornitología 16(2): 1–19.
