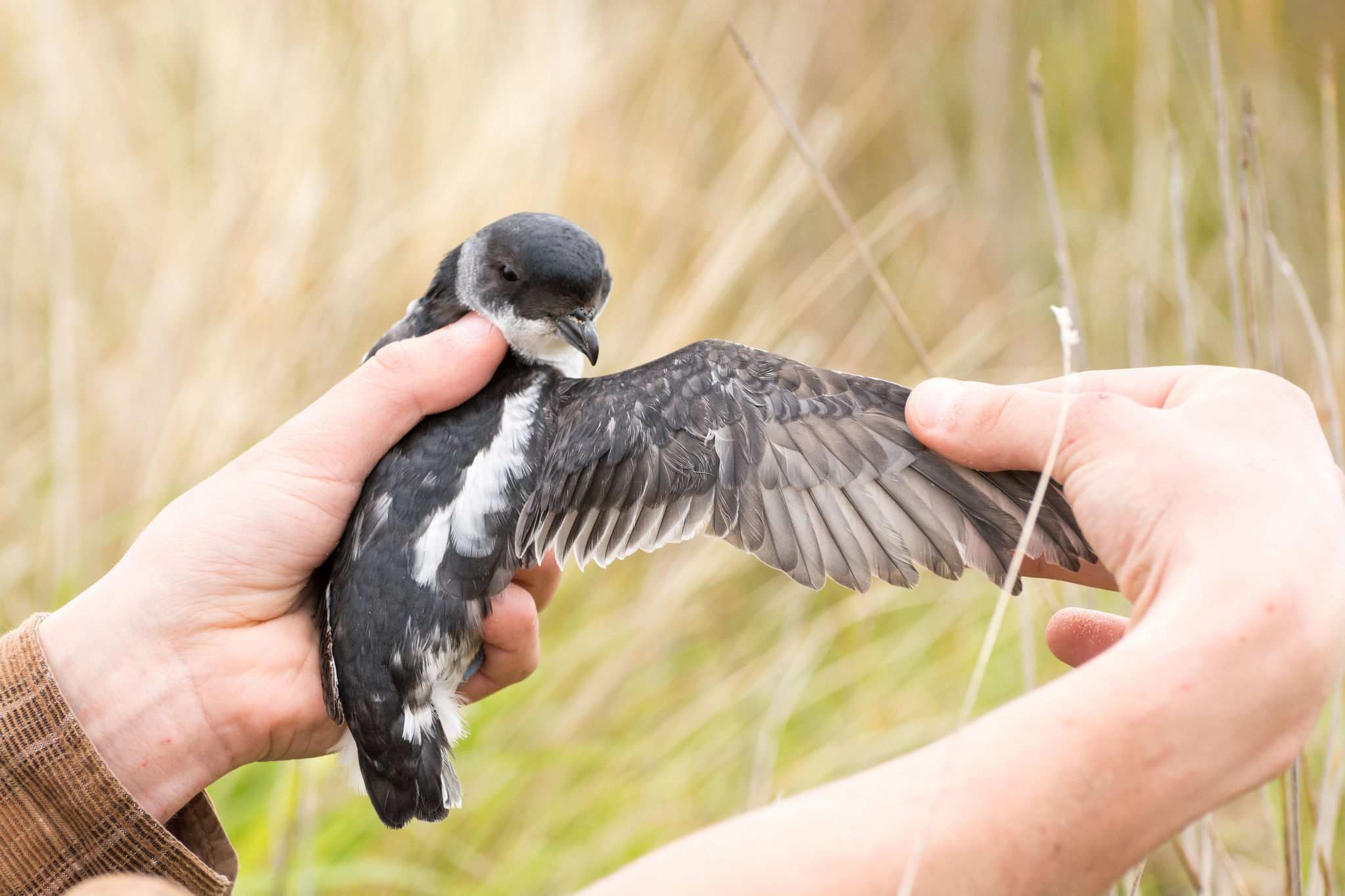

Conservation status
- Critically Endangered (IUCN 3.1)

Scientific classification
- Kingdom: Animalia
- Phylum: Chordata
- Class: Aves
- Order: Procellariiformes
- Family: Procellariidae
- Genus: Pelecanoides
- Species: P. georgicus
- Subspecies: P. g. whenuahouensis

Trinomial name
- Pelecanoides georgicus whenuahouensis Fischer et al., 2018

= Whenua Hou diving petrel =

Subspecies of bird

The Whenua Hou diving petrel (Pelecanoides georgicus whenuahouensis) known also as Kuaka, is a highly endangered subspecies of the South Georgia diving petrel that is endemic to New Zealand.

The subspecies was first described by Johannes H. Fischer and collaborators in 2018. While formerly considered a unique population of the South Georgia diving petrel, differences in habitat preference and analyses of phenotypic differentiations indicates that it could be considered as a distinct species. Only one extremely small population (less than 150 individuals) currently exists, breeding on the predator-free Whenua Hou island. There, it displays the unique nesting practice of burrowing into the sand dunes overlooking Sealers Bay, unlike the South Georgia diving petrel which nests on rocky slopes or flat land.

Based on subfossil remains, this subspecies formerly nested on Auckland Island and Stewart Island, and possibly on the Chatham and Macquarie islands as well. It was extirpated from Auckland due to nest destruction by New Zealand sea lions, while on Stewart it was extirpated due to nest predation by the introduced Polynesian rat. The remaining population itself is highly threatened by storm events; one such event in 2003 led to the collapse of many dunes, killing many birds. They are also threatened by the advance of coastal forest and invasive grasses and herbs over the dunes, as well as sea level rise due to climate change. While the petrel's foraging areas are unknown, an oil spill over this area would be devastating for this subspecies.
