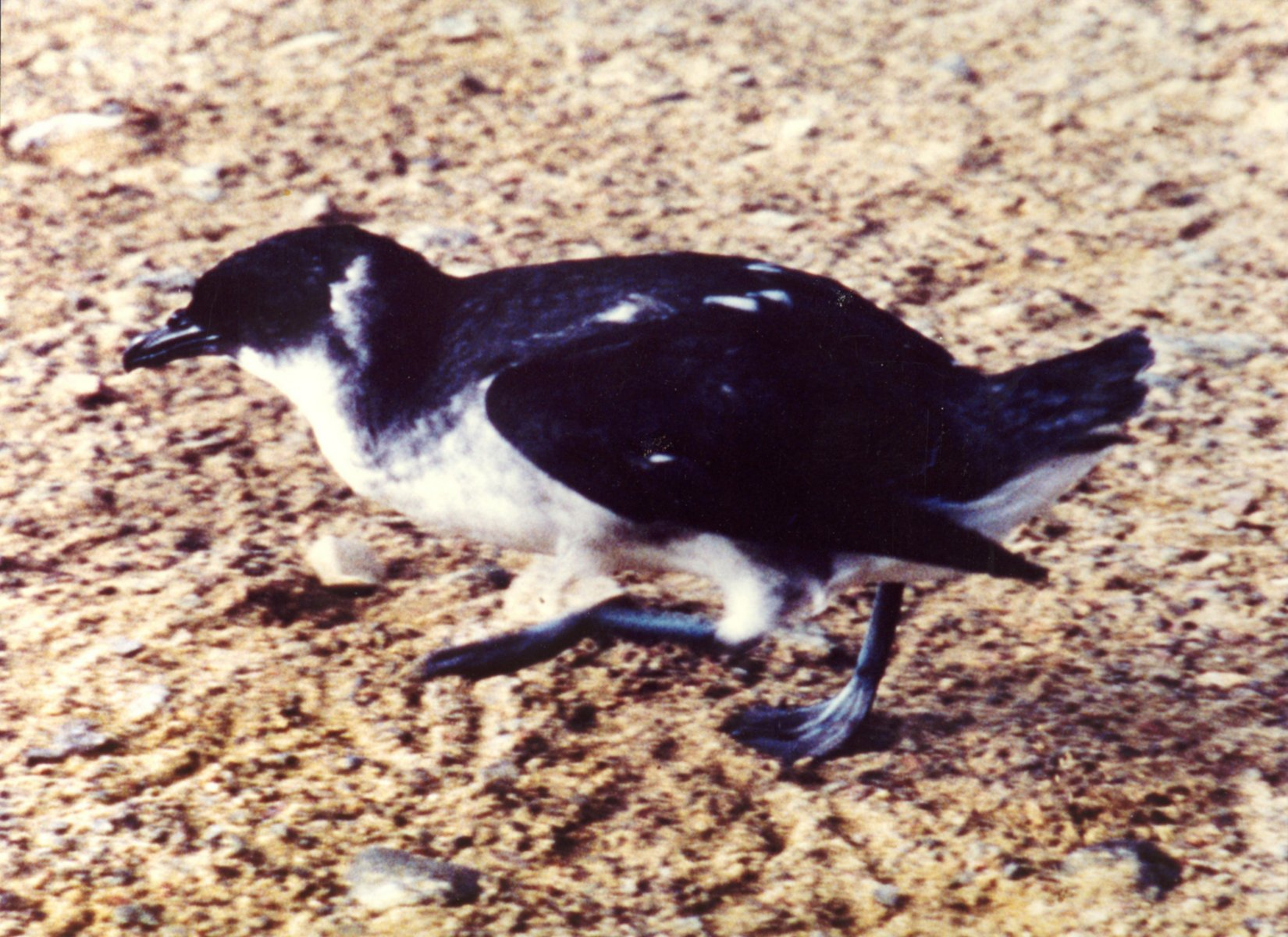
- Peruvian diving petrel (Pelecanoides garnotii)

Scientific classification
- Kingdom: Animalia
- Phylum: Chordata
- Class: Aves
- Order: Procellariiformes
- Family: Procellariidae
- Genus: Pelecanoides; Lacépède, 1799

Type species
- Procellaria urinatrix (common diving petrel) Gmelin, 1789

Species
- Pelecanoides garnotii Pelecanoides magellani Pelecanoides georgicus Pelecanoides urinatrix

Synonyms
- Haladroma Illiger, 1811 Onocralus Rafinesque, 1815 (nomen novum) Puffinuria R.-P. Lesson, 1828 Porthmornis Murphy & Harper, 1921 Pelagodyptes Murphy & Harpter, 1921

= Diving petrel =

Genus of birds

The diving petrels form a genus, Pelecanoides, of seabirds in the family Procellariidae. There are four very similar species of diving petrels, distinguished only by small differences in the coloration of their plumage, habitat, and bill construction. They are only found in the southern hemisphere. The diving petrels were formerly placed in their own family, the Pelecanoididae.

Diving petrels are auk-like small petrels of the southern oceans. The resemblances with the auks are due to convergent evolution, since both families feed by pursuit diving, although some researchers have in the past suggested that the similarities are due to relatedness. Among the Procellariiformes the diving petrels are the family most adapted to life in the sea rather than flying over it, and are generally found closer inshore than other families in the order.

== Taxonomy ==
The genus Pelecanoides was introduced in 1799 by the French naturalist Bernard Germain de Lacépède for the common diving petrel. The genus name combines the Ancient Greek pelekan meaning "pelican" and "-oidēs" meaning "resembling".

The diving petrels were formerly placed in their own family, Pelecanoididae. When genetic studies found that they were embedded within the family Procellariidae, the family Pelecanoididae were merged into Procellariidae.

=== Extant Species ===
Four species are usually recognised:

Image	Scientific name	Common name	Distribution
	Pelecanoides garnotii	Peruvian diving petrel	Coasts and islands of Peru and Chile.
	Pelecanoides magellani	Magellanic diving petrel	Channels and fjords of southern Chile and Tierra del Fuego.
	Pelecanoides georgicus	South Georgia diving petrel	South Georgia and surrounding islets in the south Atlantic, and on the Prince Edward Islands, Crozet Islands, Kerguelen Islands and Heard Island and McDonald Islands in the southern Indian Ocean
	Pelecanoides urinatrix	Common diving petrel	Most widespread species; found on New Zealand islands such as the Solander Islands / Hautere, Snares Islands / Tini Heke, Chatham Islands, Auckland Islands, Antipodes Islands, Campbell Island / Motu Ihupuku, and numerous islands off the North Island; islands off southeast Australia and Tasmania, islands around the Australia-administered Macquarie Island, subantarctic islands of the Indian Ocean including the Prince Edward Islands, Crozet Islands, Kerguelen Islands, and Heard and McDonald Islands; in the Atlantic, it breeds at South Georgia, Tristan da Cunha Islands, Gough Island, Falkland Islands, and subspecies coppingeri assumed to breed in uncertain areas in Chile.

A fifth species, the Whenua Hou diving petrel (Pelecanoides whenuahouensis), is sometimes recognised. It was first described in 2018 and is found around Codfish Island / Whenua Hou, New Zealand. In the bird list maintained by Frank Gill, Pamela Rasmussen and David Donsker on behalf of the International Ornithological Committee the Whenua Hou diving petrel is treated as a subspecies of the South Georgia diving petrel.

The evolution and systematics of these birds is not well researched. Several populations were described as distinct species and while most of them are only subspecies, some may indeed be distinct. The prehistoric fossil record was long limited to very fragmentary remains described as P. cymatotrypetes found in Early Pliocene deposits of Langebaanweg, South Africa; while this bird apparently was close to the common diving petrel, no members of the genus are known from South African waters today.

In 2007, a humerus piece from New Zealand was described as P. miokuaka. This was found in Early/Middle Miocene deposits and just as may be expected, it far more resembles diving petrels than any other known bird, but presents a less apomorphic condition.

== Description ==
The diving petrels are small petrels that measure between 19–23 cm (7.5–9 in) and weigh 120–200 g (4.2–7.1 oz). They are highly uniform in appearance, and very difficult to distinguish when seen at sea. They are best distinguished by the size and shape of their short bills. The plumage is shining black on the top and white on the underside. Their wings are short, particularly with regards to overall body size, and used in a highly characteristic whirring flight. This flight is low over the water and diving petrels will fly through the crests of waves without any interruption of their flight path. In the water these wings are half folded and used as paddles to propel the bird after its prey.

== Behaviour ==
=== Food and feeding ===
Diving petrels are plankton feeders, taking mostly crustacean prey such as krill, copepods and the amphipod Themisto gaudichaudii, also taking small fish and squid. They have several adaptations for obtaining their prey including short powerful wings, a gular pouch for storing food, and their nostrils open upwards rather than pointing forward as in other tubenoses.

=== Breeding ===
These birds nest in colonies on islands. One white egg is laid in a burrow in turf or soft soil that is usually covered with vegetation, feathers, or small rocks. They are nocturnal at the breeding colonies. It has a long period of parental care (around 45 to 60 days) in the burrow, but once the chick fledges out to sea it is on its own.

=== Migration ===
The patterns of the diving petrel are largely sedentary. The common diving petrel takes a seasonal migration between New Zealand's coastal and subantarctic islands to the Antarctic front. This takes place after the breeding season.

== Status and conservation ==
Of the four species, two, the Peruvian diving petrel and the Magellanic diving petrel, have highly restricted ranges around South America's coasts, while the common diving petrel and the South Georgia diving petrel range widely across the southern oceans, breeding on islands off New Zealand, Subantarctic islands in the Indian Ocean, and islands in the south Atlantic (like Tristan da Cunha). The subspecies, the Whenua Hou diving petrel, has an extremely restricted range, breeding only on New Zealand's Codfish Island / Whenua Hou.

Diving petrels are among the world's most numerous birds, with common and South Georgia diving petrels numbering several million pairs each. The Peruvian and Whenua Hou diving petrels, on the other hand, are highly threatened by guano extraction, introduced species and climate change, and are considered endangered species.
