= Niceforo's pintail =

Conservation status
- Extinct (1950s)

Scientific classification
- Kingdom: Animalia
- Phylum: Chordata
- Class: Aves
- Order: Anseriformes
- Family: Anatidae
- Genus: Anas
- Species: A. georgica
- Subspecies: †A. g. niceforoi

Trinomial name
- †Anas georgica niceforoi Wetmore & Borrero, 1946

Synonyms
- Anas niceforoi

Subspecies of bird

Niceforo's pintail (Anas georgica niceforoi) is an extinct subspecies of the yellow-billed pintail (Anas georgica), a duck in the dabbling duck subfamily Anatinae. One of three subspecies, it was found in central Colombia but became extinct in the 1950s, being last seen in 1952.

== Description ==
Niceforo's pintail was darker and richer in colouration than the nearest other subspecies, the Chilean pintail A. g. spinicauda, with the head and neck more streaked, the crown dark brown and with a less pointed tail.

== Distribution ==
The former range of included subtropical and temperate zones of north-central Colombia, 1000–3000 m above sea level in the upper Cauca Valley, the central part of the Cordillera Oriental, the Bogota Savannah and Cundinamarca.
