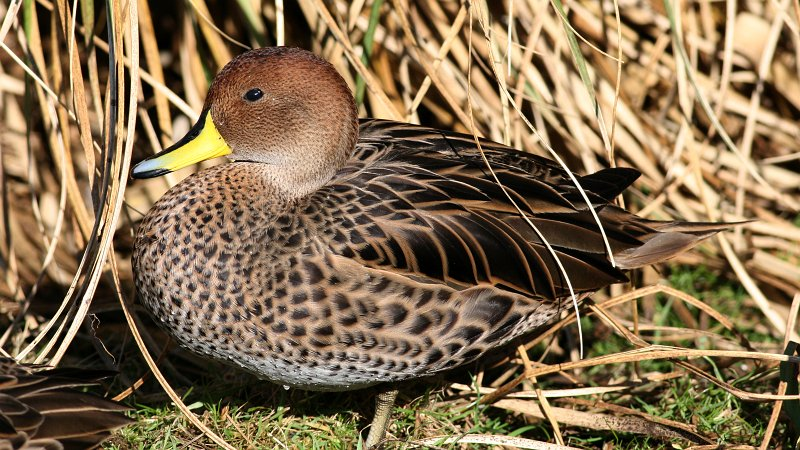

Conservation status
- Least Concern (IUCN 3.1)

Scientific classification
- Kingdom: Animalia
- Phylum: Chordata
- Class: Aves
- Order: Anseriformes
- Family: Anatidae
- Genus: Anas
- Species: A. georgica

Binomial name
- Anas georgica Gmelin, 1789

Subspecies
- See text

Synonyms
- Dafila georgica

= Yellow-billed pintail =

Species of bird

The yellow-billed pintail (Anas georgica) is a South American dabbling duck of the genus Anas with three described subspecies.

== Taxonomy ==
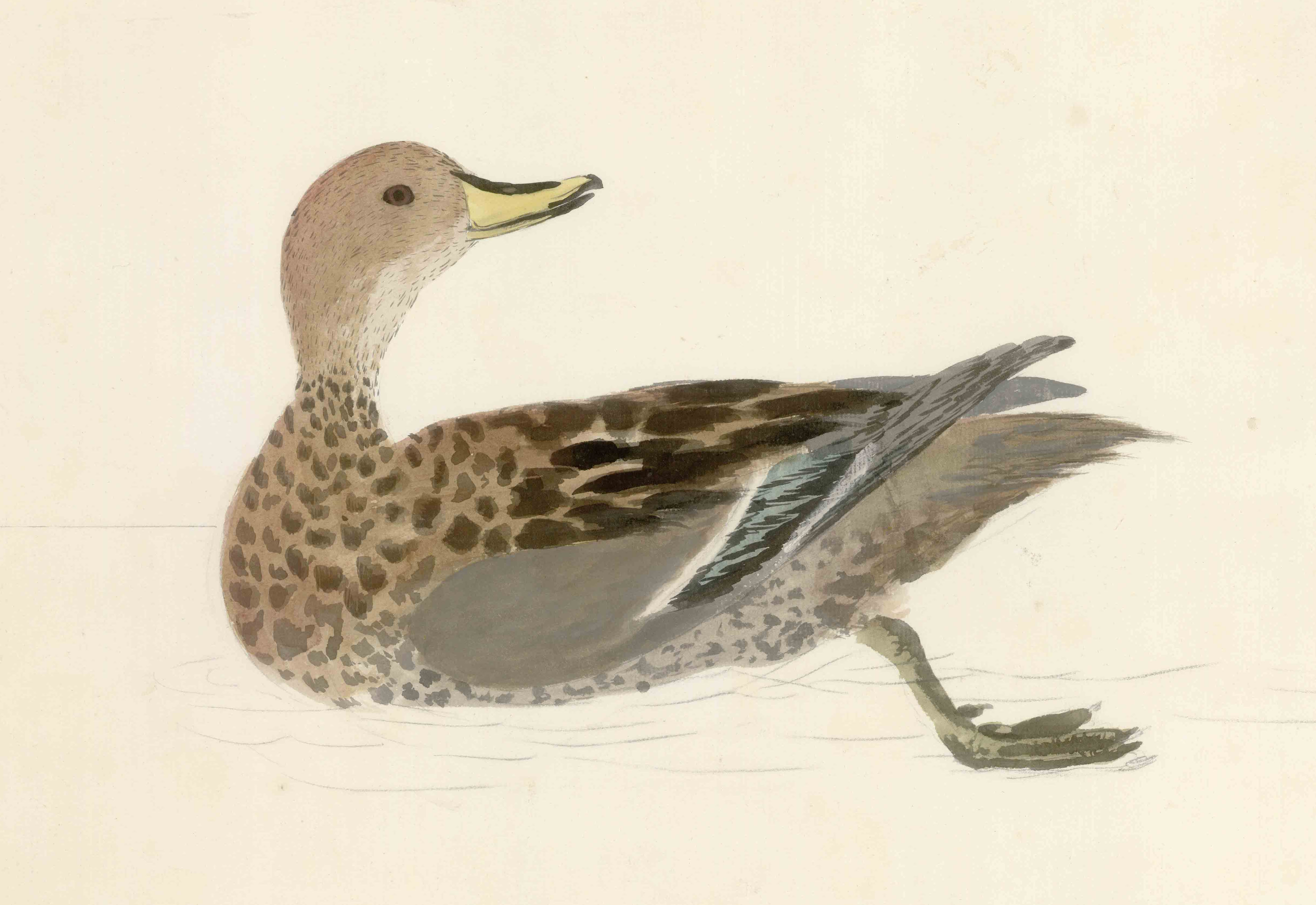
Watercolour made by Georg Forster in 1775 on James Cook's second voyage to the Pacific Ocean. This picture is the holotype for the species.

The yellow-billed pintail was formally described in 1789 by the German naturalist Johann Friedrich Gmelin in his revised and expanded edition of Carl Linnaeus's Systema Naturae. He placed it with all the ducks, geese, and swans in the genus Anas and coined the binomial name Anas georgica. Gmelin based his description on the "Georgia duck" that had been described in 1785 by the English ornithologist John Latham in his A General Synopsis of Birds. The naturalist Joseph Banks had provided Latham with a water-colour drawing of the duck by Georg Forster who had accompanied James Cook on his second voyage to the Pacific Ocean. The watercolour was painted in 1775 in South Georgia. This picture is now the holotype for the species and is held by the Natural History Museum in London. The genus name Anas is the Latin word for a duck.

Three subspecies are recognised:

- † A. g. niceforoi Wetmore & Borrero, 1946 – east-central Colombia (extinct)
- A. g. spinicauda Vieillot, 1816 – south Colombia to south Argentina, south Chile, and the Falkland Islands
- A. g. georgica Gmelin, JF, 1789 – South Georgia

== Description ==
The yellow-billed pintail has a brown head and neck. The bill is yellow with a black tip and a black stripe down the middle. The tail is brownish and pointed. The upper wing is grayish-brown, and the secondaries are blackish-green. The rest of the body is buffish brown with varying-sized black spots. The species is sometimes confused with yellow-billed teal (Anas flavirostris) but can be differentiated by the yellow stripes on its bill, its larger size, and its tendency not to form large groups. The nominate subspecies is smaller and darker than Anas g. spinicauda. The yellow-billed pintail forms a superspecies with the northern pintail (Anas acuta).

== Distribution and habitat ==
The range includes much of South America, the Falkland Islands, and South Georgia. The nominate and smallest subspecies, the South Georgia pintail A. g. georgica, is thought to number between 1000 and 1500 pairs and is found only in South Georgia. The Chilean, or brown, pintail A. g. spinicauda is widespread on the South American mainland from extreme southern Colombia southwards, as well as in the Falkland Islands, and numbers well over 110,000. Niceforo's pintail A. g. niceforoi, formerly found in central Colombia, is believed to be extinct, having been last recorded in 1952 (and described only in 1946). Their habitat ranges from high-elevation lakes and marshes to low-elevation lakes and rivers and coasts in open country.

== Breeding ==
The nest is placed on the ground in vegetation close to water. It is lined with grass and down. The clutch is 4 to 10 eggs which hatch after incubation for around 26 days. The chicks have dark brown down above and yellow down below.

== Physiology ==
In high-altitude populations of yellow-billed pintail, hemoglobin has a higher affinity for oxygen than in lower-altitude populations, which can be attributable to substitutions in their beta-globin gene. These substitutions are shared by speckled teal because of introgressive hybridization between the two species. Gene flow between populations also suggests that yellow-billed pintails that are heterozygous for the βA hemoglobin subunit may be able to acclimate to high altitudes more efficiently than those that are homozygous for the βA hemoglobin subunit.

== Gallery ==
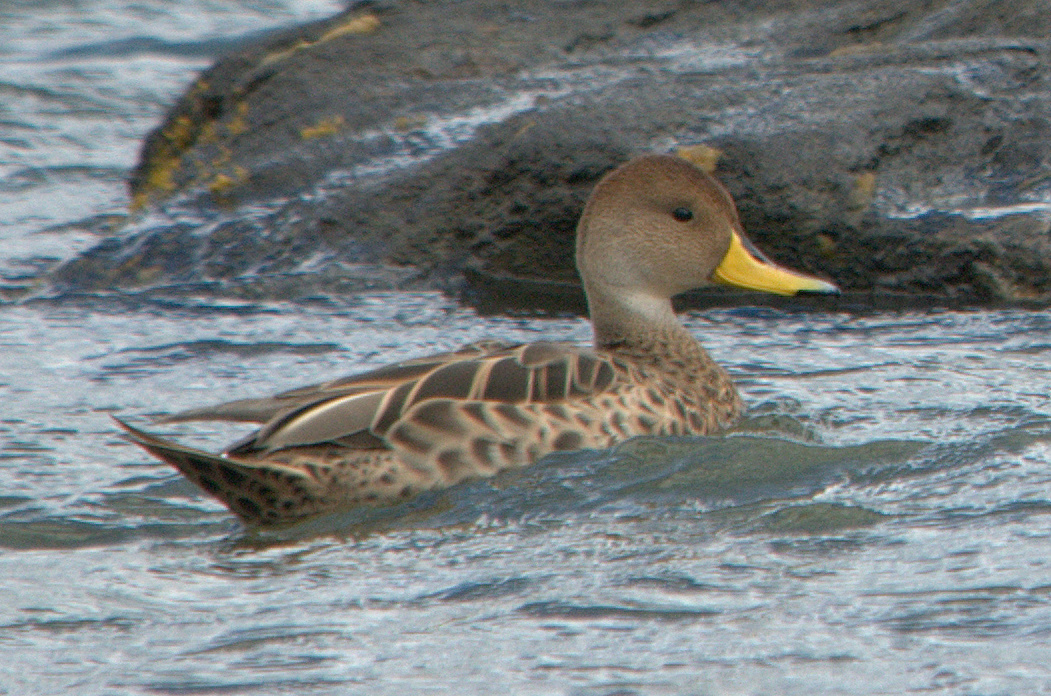

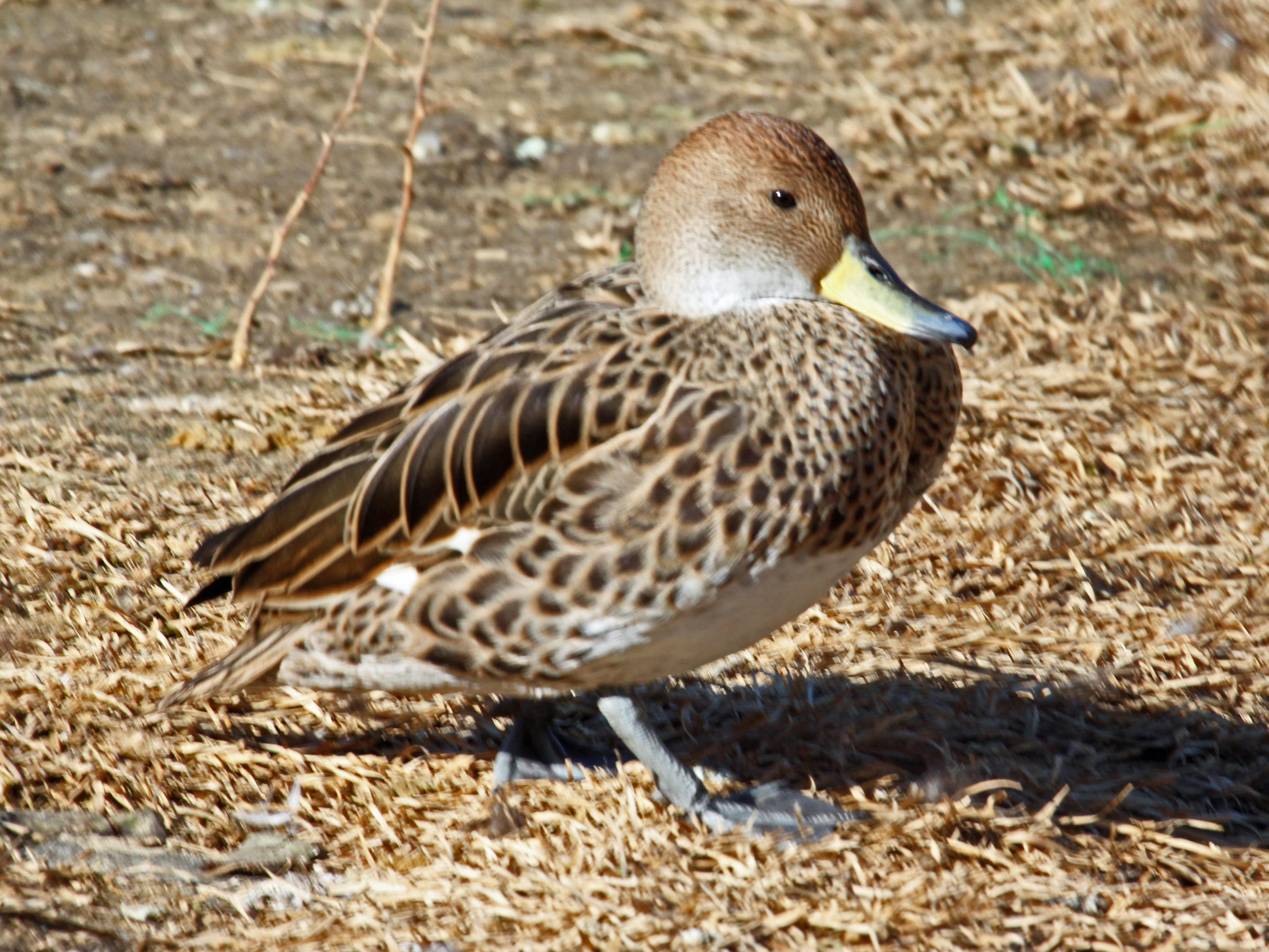
