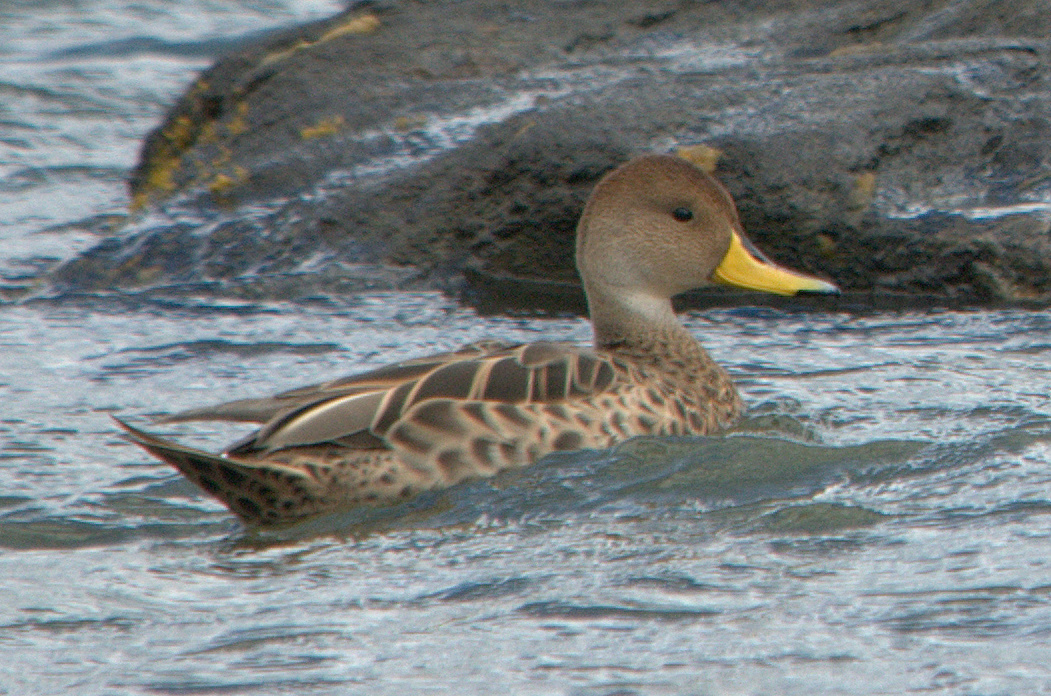
- In Patagonia

Scientific classification
- Kingdom: Animalia
- Phylum: Chordata
- Class: Aves
- Order: Anseriformes
- Family: Anatidae
- Genus: Anas
- Species: A. georgica
- Subspecies: A. g. spinicauda

Trinomial name
- Anas georgica spinicauda Vieillot, 1816

Synonyms
- Anas spinicauda

= Chilean pintail =

Subspecies of bird

The Chilean pintail (Anas georgica spinicauda), also known as the golden peck duck or brown pintail, is a subspecies of the yellow-billed pintail (Anas georgica), a duck in the dabbling duck subfamily Anatinae. Its local names are pato jergón grande, pato maicero and pato piquidorado in Spanish, and marreca-parda or marreca-danada in Portuguese.

== Distribution and habitat ==
The Chilean pintail is one of three subspecies of the yellow-billed pintail, and by far the most numerous and widespread. It is found throughout much of South America from extreme southern Colombia southwards to Tierra del Fuego, as well as in the Falkland Islands. The two other subspecies are the smaller South Georgia pintail which is limited to the subantarctic island of South Georgia and which is sometimes considered a separate species, and the extinct Niceforo's pintail, which occurred formerly in central Colombia.

Chilean pintails inhabit freshwater lakes, rivers, marshes, lagoons and flooded meadows up to 4600 m above sea level in the puna zone of the Andes. Populations in the northern parts of the range are mainly sedentary; those further south migrate for the austral winter as far north as southern Brazil.

== Description ==
Chilean pintails are about 65 cm long. Males weigh 740-830 g and the females 660-770 g. The head and neck are brown with fine black mottling; the throat and foreneck paler. The body is mainly buff-brown with dark centres to the feathers, the birds appearing as spotted on the breast, and paler on the underparts. The feathers of the upperparts are brown-black with buff edges. The wings are grey-brown with buff-tipped greater coverts and glossy black secondaries with buff tips. The speculum is glossy black edged with buff. Females are similar to males though slightly duller in appearance. Juveniles are similar to the adults, but greyer, and with streaking on the breast and underparts. Chilean pintails are generally paler than Niceforo's pintail, and both greyer and distinctly larger than the South Georgia pintail.

== Breeding ==
In the south of their range, the pintails start breeding from October to December, while in the north, in Peru, they breed from August to March. The cream to pale pinkish eggs are about 56 × 40 mm in size, with a weight of 42 g. Incubation takes about 26 days and the period from hatching to fledging 45–60 days.
