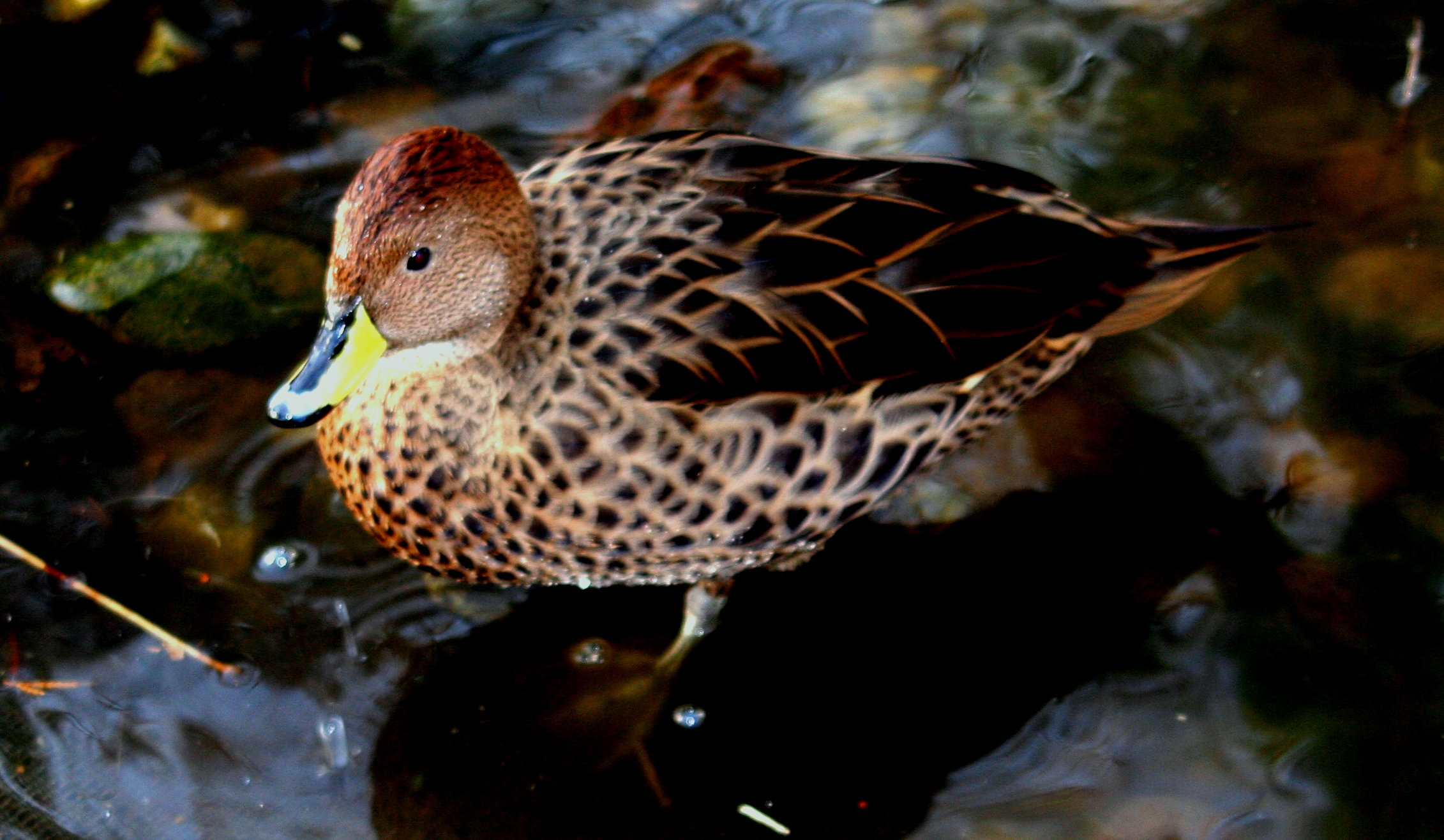

Scientific classification
- Kingdom: Animalia
- Phylum: Chordata
- Class: Aves
- Order: Anseriformes
- Family: Anatidae
- Genus: Anas
- Species: A. georgica
- Subspecies: A. g. georgica

Trinomial name
- Anas georgica georgica Gmelin, 1789

Synonyms
- Nettion georgica; Nettium georgica; Querquedula georgica; Anas georgica

= South Georgia pintail =

Subspecies of bird

The South Georgia pintail (Anas georgica georgica), also misleadingly known as the South Georgian teal, is the nominate subspecies of the yellow-billed pintail (Anas georgica), a duck in the dabbling duck subfamily Anatinae. It is endemic to the large (3,756 km^{2}) subantarctic island of South Georgia and its accompanying archipelago, and is a vagrant to the South Sandwich Islands. It was among the birds noted by James Cook in January 1775, on the occasion of the first recorded landing on South Georgia, and was formerly considered a full species.

== Taxonomy ==
The duck has long been recognised as a distinct taxon, with its affinities previously considered to be with the teals. Robert Cushman Murphy was the first to demonstrate that it is a pintail, its closest relatives the yellow-billed pintails of South America (now split as the Chilean pintail A. g. spinicauda and the extinct Niceforo's pintail A. g. niceforoi), though he retained it as a full species for its isolated distribution and its 16 (rather than 14) rectrices, or tail feathers. However, the number of rectrices in the ducks is variable, with many mainland pintails also having 16 rectrices and a few South Georgia pintails even having 18, and the three ducks are now usually lumped as the yellow-billed pintail.

== Description ==
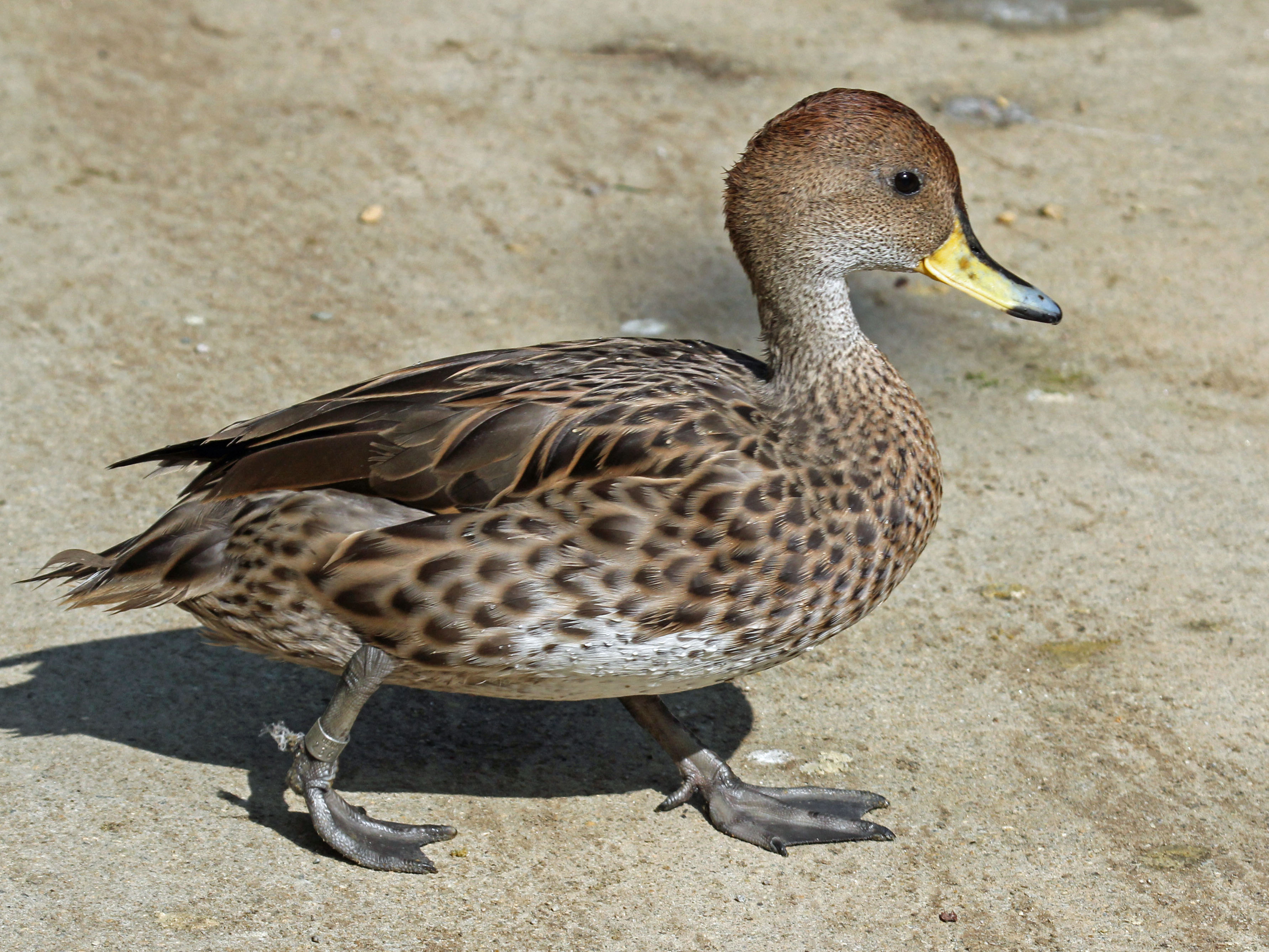

The duck is a distinctive small, mottled, predominantly brown pintail. It is smaller and stockier than the remaining mainland subspecies (A. g. spinicauda), with more uniform and darker plumage. It has a reddish crown, light brown cheeks and throat, dark grey underwings and a pointed tail. The back, breast and flanks are scalloped with buff; the underparts are buffy white, mottled with brown. The bill is yellow with a blue and black line on the culmen and tip, and the feet are greenish-grey. The downy chick is dark brown with yellowish buff markings.

Unlike other pintails, the males are similar in appearance to the females, though larger. The ducks are 45 to 65 cm in length, the males weighing 610 to 660 g, the females 460 to 610 g. Minor differences are that the male has uniformly brownish-grey upperwing coverts and a glossy greenish-black speculum, while the female has mottled upperwing coverts and a dull brown speculum.

=== Identification ===
The only species it is likely to be confused with is the yellow-billed teal, a relatively recent self-introduction first recorded breeding on South Georgia in 1971. The speckled teal also has a yellow bill but differs in being smaller and more compact, with less spotting on the flanks, and having a buff bar in front of the speculum, a central white stripe on the underwing, and a shorter and less pointed tail.

== Distribution and habitat ==
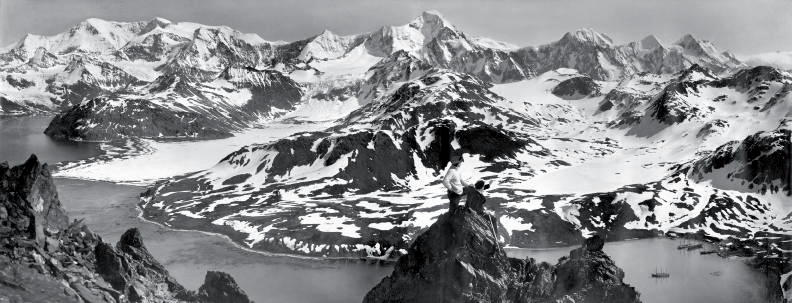
South Georgian panorama

The pintail is widely distributed along the north coast, and the western third of the south coast, of South Georgia, as well as on its offshore islands. It is largely absent from most of the south coast of the main island because of unfavourable topography.

Favoured habitat includes freshwater pools and streams fringed by tussock grassland, seal wallows and poorly drained land next to wetlands and melting snow, as well as coastal habitats.

== Behaviour ==
Outside the breeding season, and when food is locally abundant, the ducks may congregate in small flocks, sometimes of up to about a hundred. Murphy noted:

On December 20th, 1912, I photographed a pair of teals feeding in a trickle of water which ran through tall tussock grass from the melting edge of a glacier. The birds were well hidden by the screen of grass, and I almost stumbled over them before seeing them. They appeared quite unconcerned, however, and continued prodding about in the mud. When I had come within two steps of them, they raised their heads and waddled farther off among the hummocks, from where they peered out through drooping grass. All but the bright eyes and yellow bills blended completely with the surroundings. Matthews has well said that their pattern fits in so thoroughly with the environment that it is sometimes only the movement of the conspicuous yellow bill that calls one’s attention to their presence. Many observers have noted the birds’ preference to lose themselves in the grass when they are approached, rather than to seek safety in the air, and it is likely that before the arrival of men and guns at South Georgia they used their wings only for relatively short and infrequent flights.

=== Feeding ===
The ducks are omnivorous; they feed on vegetation, including marine and freshwater algae, dabbling and diving in the sea when the water is calm. They also consume a range of invertebrates, including freshwater fairy shrimp (Brachinecta gaini), marine amphipods, Diptera, small clams, nematodes and snails, foraging in the intertidal zone and sometimes scavenging at seal carcasses.

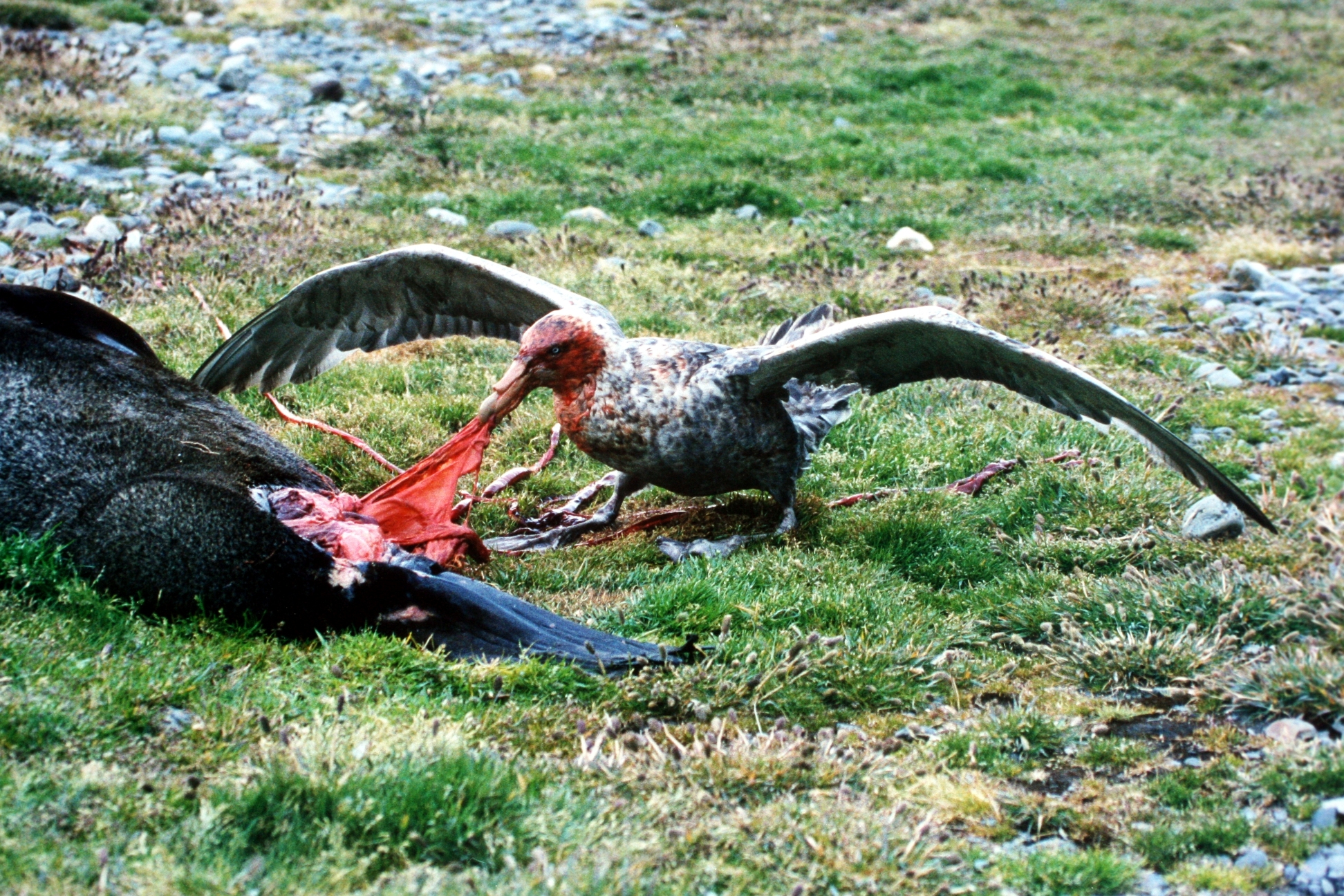
Giant petrel feeding on seal carcass on South Georgia

David Parmelee describes the latter behaviour from Bird Island as follows:

"One might surmise that the delicate little pintails wait their turn to pick at the bones and small scraps left by the larger predators. Wrong assumption! As soon as there is a small opening in the seal carcass the ducks dive headlong into the hole, which conceals from view their bills and at times even their heads.
"The head is methodically withdrawn time and again for surveillance, but it is not unusual to see both giant petrels and pintails simultaneously picking at the same carcass. The ducks are so clever in maneuvering that not many are caught unaware. Unlike the giant petrels that acquire grisly scarlet heads while gorging on the bloody flesh, the fastidious pintails remain remarkably clean by dipping frequently into streams or pools of water."

=== Breeding ===
South Georgia pintails breed in solitary pairs during a long breeding season from late October to early March. Their nests are frequently sited some distance away from water; they are well concealed in tussock grass, often on a shallow platform of grass stems and down feathers above the ground and shielded from above by overhanging vegetation. When returning from feeding, they usually land some distance away from the nest before creeping to it through the undergrowth, so as not to lead predatory birds to the vulnerable eggs and chicks. They lay small clutches of three to five pale cinnamon-pink eggs, and their chicks' down is dark. They mate for life, with males assisting in raising the young.

The preferred habitat for raising broods is tussock-rimmed freshwater ponds where the chicks feed around the edges while the female stays in more open water. The broods are moved overland through the tussock from pond to pond. Niall Rankin, who led an expedition to South Georgia after the Second World War, said:

I never discovered a nest with eggs, but found two ducklings on Albatross Island, about two days old, on December 18th, also another brood about a week old on March 11th.
Their speed was incredible, dashing from clump to clump like small rats, and it took considerable time to catch them. The parent meanwhile showed little concern, resting on a rock at the edge of the sea some 30 yards away. Their only natural enemy is the skua and time must have shown that so long as the ducklings remain amongst the alleyways between the overhanging clumps little harm can befall them.

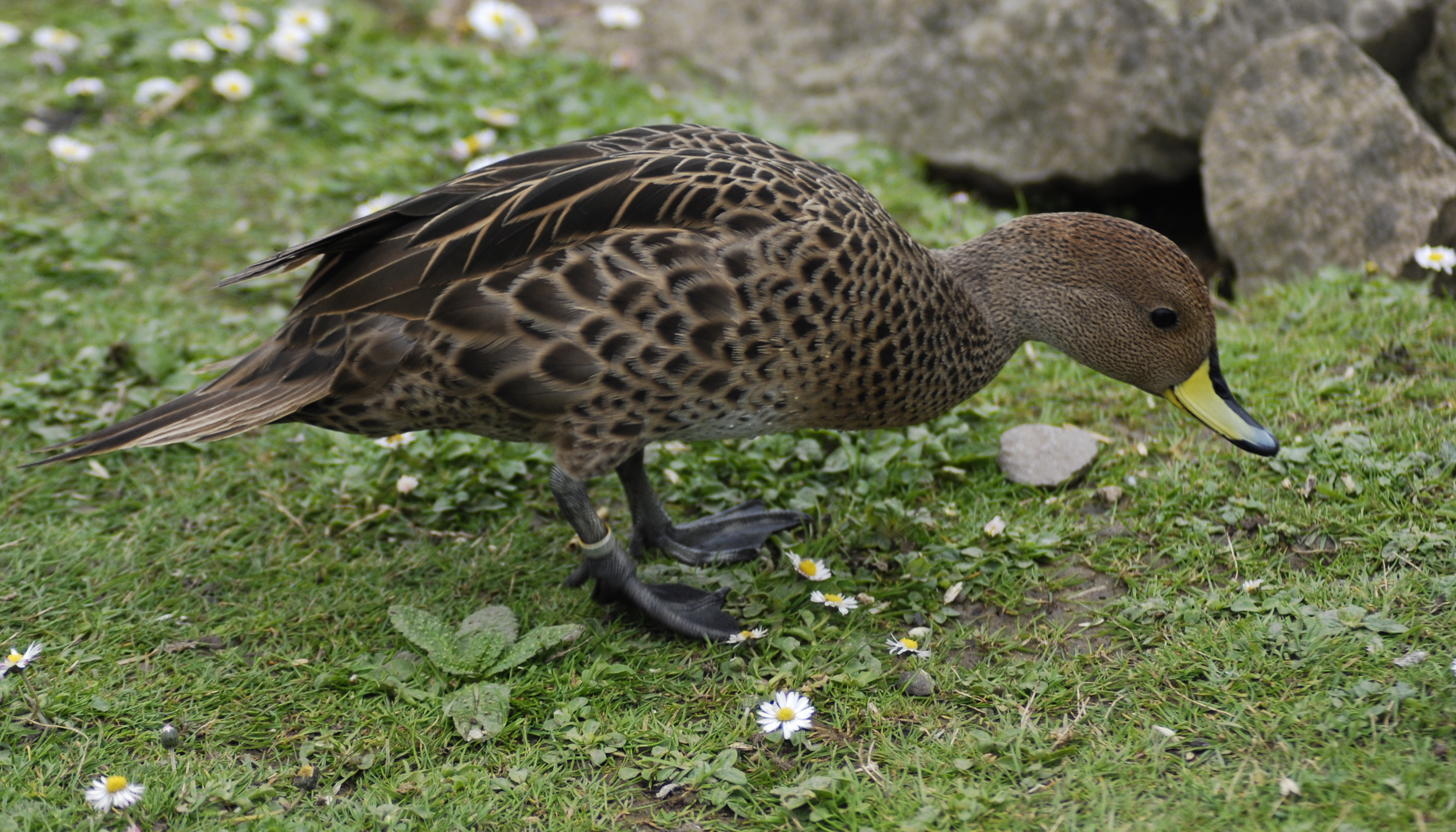
South Georgia pintail

=== Vocalisations ===
Calls recorded from the adult male include a burp – a wheezy, hollow-sounding geee-geeee, rising and falling in pitch, with a concurrent double-noted whistle. Females have been heard to give a decrescendo call similar to that of the northern pintail, as well as a creaking “inciting call” and a rasping “repulsion call”. Murphy notes “The call of the male is a shrill whistle, repeated several times and frequently uttered in flight. The duck utters a soft quack, and a gurgling note which von den Steinen likened to the bursting of large bubbles.”

== Conservation and status ==
=== Population ===
In the late 19th and early 20th centuries the pintails were considered common; though Murphy reported that, by 1912, intensive hunting by whalers and sealers had reduced the population considerably. Rankin, who visited the island in 1946–47 when it was still a base for whaling operations, commented:

”Formerly this little duck was common throughout the coastal belt of the island, but as soon as whaling stations started to spring up and its flesh became appreciated the bird stood little chance of survival if it ventured near any of the populated fjords. Numbers have steadily decreased and while 40 years ago a flock of 100 teal was not an uncommon sight in the winter season, now it is unusual to see more than half a dozen together. In late autumn the most I myself ever saw was four.

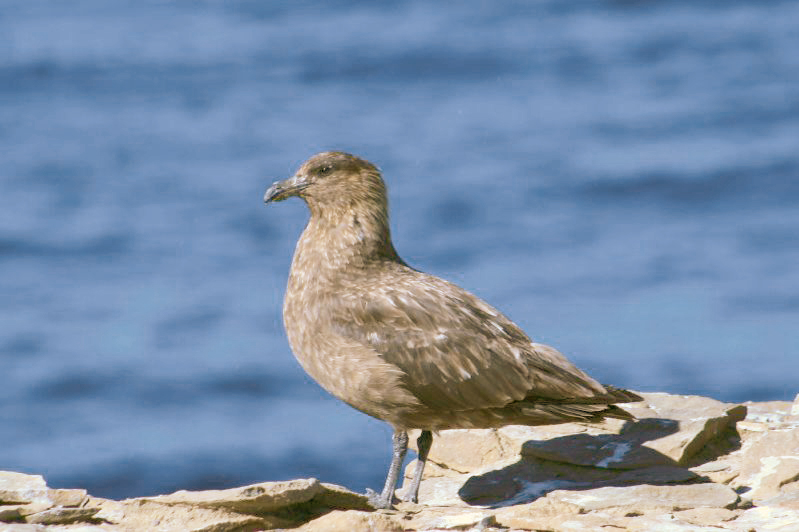
Brown Skua – a predator of eggs and chicks

Numbers have since recovered with the abandonment of South Georgia as a whaling base; the population probably exceeds 2,000 and is about as abundant as can be expected for the available habitat. The pintail was described in 1979 as being widespread in small numbers and frequenting most bays and coastal areas of South Georgia.

=== Threats ===
Hunting by humans is no longer a serious threat. The eggs and chicks of the ducks were at risk from introduced brown rats which were eradicated in 2018 and are at risk from predatory birds, especially brown skuas. There is a record of an adult bird being killed and eaten by a leopard seal.

=== Parasites ===
The ducks are recorded as hosting the ectoparasitic nasal mite Rhinonyssus rhinolethrum.
