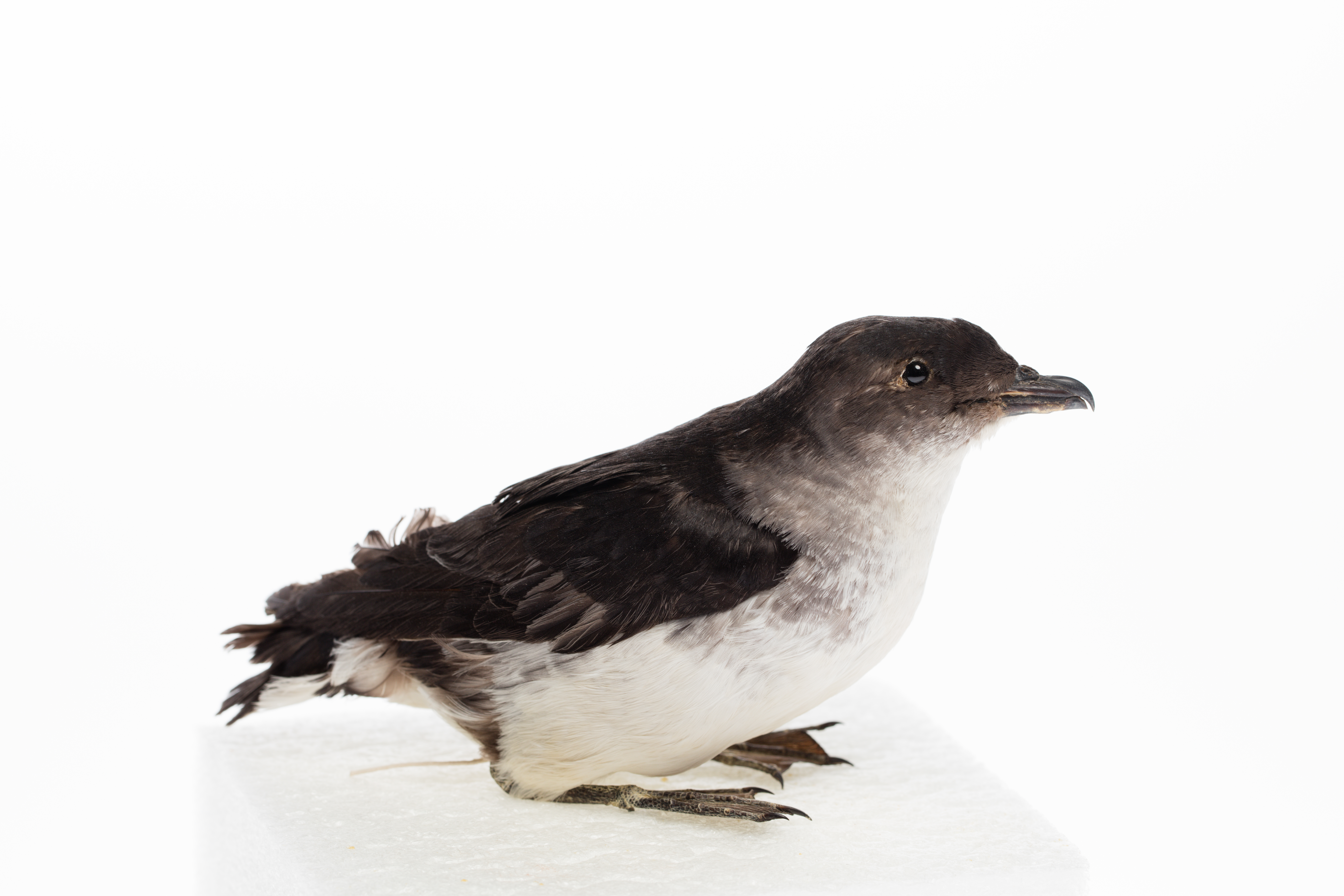
- Nominate adult Pelecanoides urinatrix specimen.

Conservation status
- Least Concern (IUCN 3.1)

Scientific classification
- Kingdom: Animalia
- Phylum: Chordata
- Class: Aves
- Order: Procellariiformes
- Family: Procellariidae
- Genus: Pelecanoides
- Species: P. urinatrix

Binomial name
- Pelecanoides urinatrix (Gmelin, JF, 1789)

= Common diving petrel =

Species of bird

The common diving petrel (Pelecanoides urinatrix), also known as the smaller diving petrel or simply the diving petrel, is a diving petrel, one of four very similar auk-like small petrels of the southern oceans. It is native to South Atlantic islands and islands of the subantarctic southern Indian Ocean, islands and islets off New Zealand and south-eastern Australian islands.

== Taxonomy ==
The common diving petrel was formally described in 1789 by the German naturalist Johann Friedrich Gmelin. He placed it with the other petrels in the genus Procellaria and coined the binomial name Procellaria urinatrix. Gmelin based his description on the "diving petrel" that had been described in 1785 by the English ornithologist John Latham in the second volume of his A General Synopsis of Birds. Latham reported that they were found in great numbers in Queen Charlotte Sound at the northern end of South Island, New Zealand. The common diving petrel is now one of four petrels placed in the genus Pelecanoides that was introduced in 1799 by the French naturalist Bernard Germain de Lacépède. The genus name, Pelecanoides, means "Pelican-resembling", which was assigned to the diving petrels on account of their expandable throat pouches that they use to carry food. Its specific name, urinatrix, is derived from the Latin term, urinator, which means "diver". Its subspecies' names include chathamensis, referring to the Chatham Islands, exsul, meaning "isolated" or "remote", dacunhae, referring to the Tristan da Cunha Islands, berard, honoring French navigator Auguste Bérard, and coppingeri, which honors Royal Navy surgeon and naturalist Richard William Coppinger.

There are six subspecies (also listed above), which vary in body measurements, particularly bill size:

- P. u. urinatrix (J. F. Gmelin, 1789): Australia, Tasmania and North Island, New Zealand.
- P. u. chathamensis (Murphy & Harper, 1916): Stewart, Snares, and Chatham Islands of New Zealand.
- P. u. exsul (Salvin, 1896): South Georgia, Subantarctic islands of the Indian Ocean such as the Kerguelen, Heard and McDonald islands, etc., and subantarctic islands of New Zealand, including the Auckland Islands, Antipodes Island, and Campbell Island.
- P. u. dacunhae (Nicoll, 1906): Tristan da Cunha archipelago and Gough Island.
- P. u. berard (Gaimard, 1823): Falkland Islands, also distributed throughout the Southwest Atlantic.
- P. u. coppingeri (Mathews, 1912): Distribution uncertain, possibly breeds in Southern Chile.

== Description ==
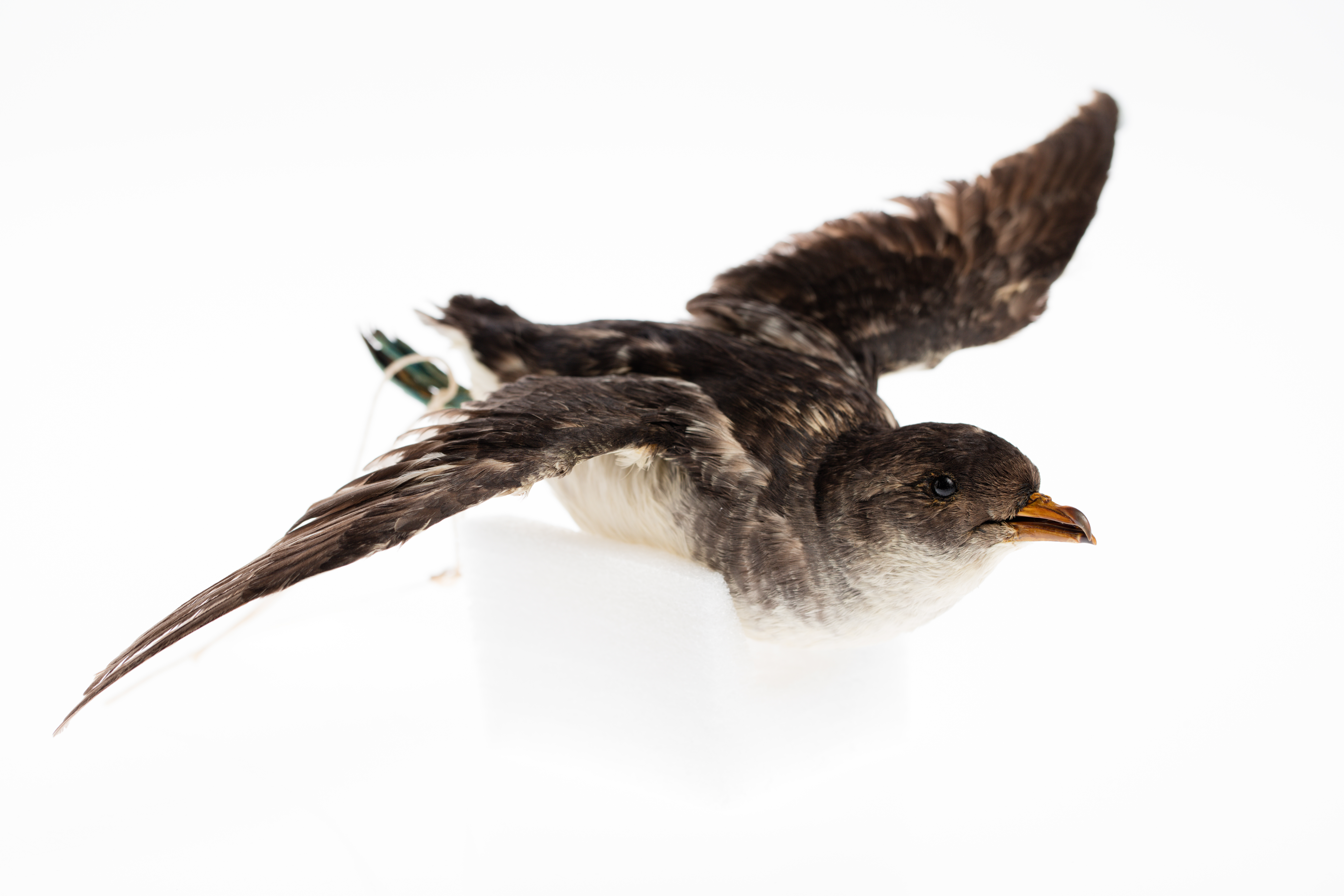
Adult specimen in flight.

The common diving petrel is a small, plump petrel, 200 to 250 mm (7.9–9.8 in) in length and weighing around 86 to 186 g (3.0–6.6 oz). The plumage is black above and dull white below and it has a relatively short black bill. The wings have thin white strips. The face and neck can be more brown than black. The legs and feet are blue with blackish-brown webbing in between the toes. Unless seen very close, it is almost indistinguishable from the South Georgian diving petrel, P. georgicus. The common diving petrel has brown inner web primary feathers, whereas the South Georgia petrel has light inner web feathering. Common petrels have smaller and narrower bills than the South Georgia petrel. Another difference is that the South Georgia diving petrel has a posterior black line down the tarsi. The common species is also slightly larger than the South Georgian species.

== Distribution and habitat ==
The common diving petrel is found between latitudes 35 and 55 degrees south, mostly around islands. While the population is decreasing, it is not believed to be rapid enough to be of concern. While 1.5 m (4.9 ft) burrows are usually dug in vegetated slopes, though they are occasionally built in flatland.

== Behaviour ==
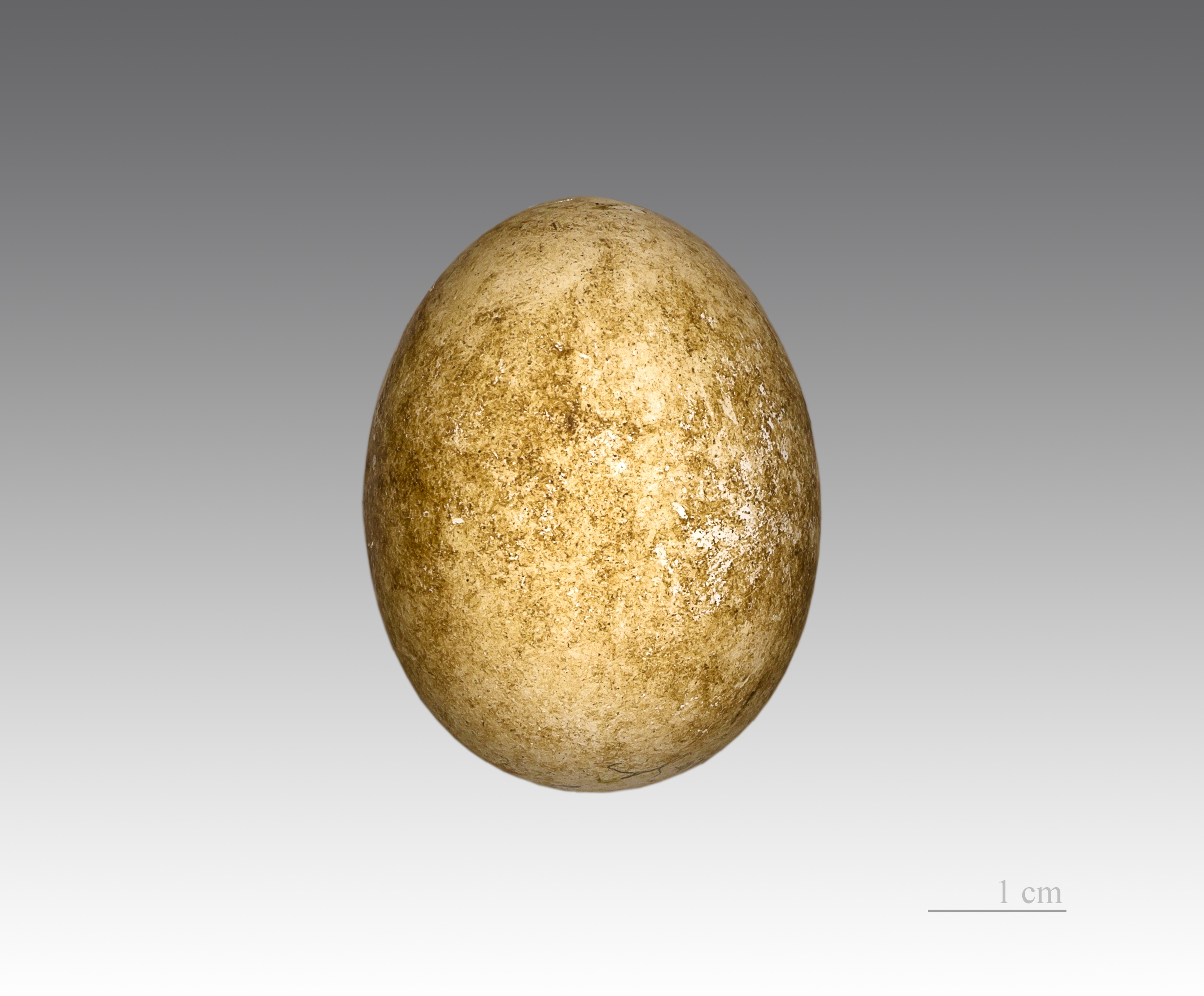
Pelecanoides urinatrix egg.

The common diving petrel feeds on the continental shelf during the breeding season, its movements during the non-breeding season are poorly known and whether it disperses more widely is not known. Like other members of their family they catch prey by wing-propelled diving, and are capable of diving to 60 m (200 ft). The diet of this species is dominated by crustaceans. They are known to forage at night on vertically migrating plankton. Feeding is mostly done in the ocean near the shore, but sometimes in the deeper pelagic zone during non-breeding season, which is only 2 months of the year.

=== Breeding ===
The mating habits are not well documented, although pairs form monogamous relationships. Breeding colonies are large and there is about one nest per 1 square metre (11 sq ft). The nest is a burrow around 50 cm long with a chamber at the bottom which may or may not be lined with dried grass. Females lay a single white egg, which measures 38 x 29 mm, and is incubated for 53–55 days. The young are brooded for 10–15 days and fledgling occurs at 45–59 days. Both parents take care of the young, which are grey-grown when hatched. The life expectancy is 6.5 years.

== Gallery ==
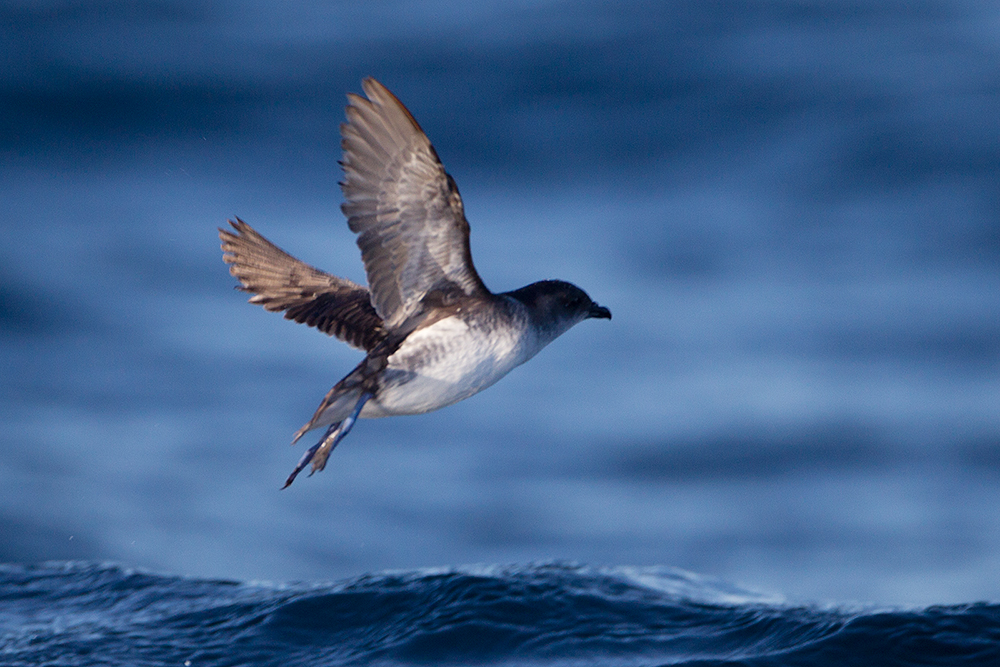
Bird flying above the ocean

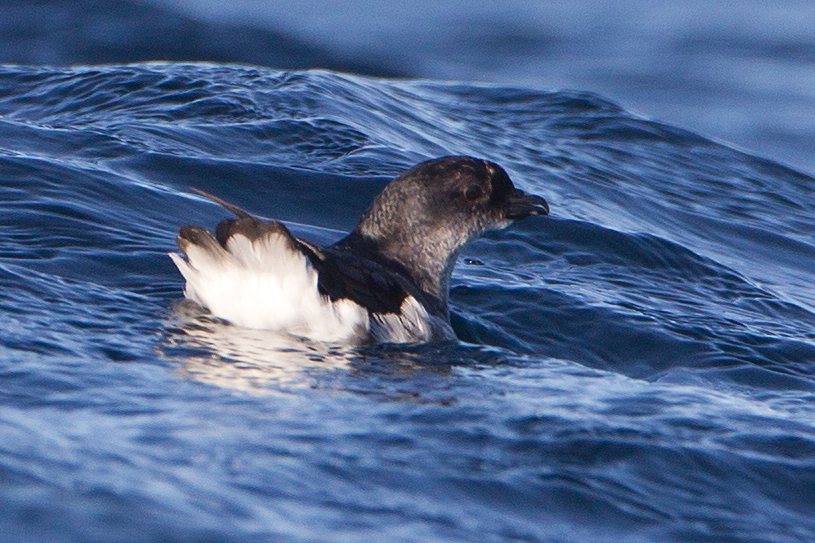
Bird resting on the ocean's surface
