= José Ignacio Borrero =

Colombian ornithologist

José Ignacio Borrero (1921–2004) was a Colombian ornithologist. He was a professor in the Department of Biology at the University of Valle at Cali. He is commemorated in the name of the possibly extinct Borrero's Cinnamon Teal (Anas cyanoptera borreroi).

== Works ==
BORRERO H., J. I. 1955. Apuntes sobre aves colombianas (Nº 2). Lozania, Acta Zoológica Colombiana 9:1-15.

BORRERO H., J. I. 1958. Aves de Caza Colombianas, Parte Anatidae. Rev. Universidad Nacional de Colombia 23:111-188.

BORRERO H., J. I. 1962. Notas varias sobre Asio ammeus bogotensis en Colombia. Rev. Biol. Trop. 10(1):45-59.

BORRERO H., J. I. 1963. El Lago de Tota. Revista de la. Facultad Nacional de Agronomía 23(58):1-15.

BORRERO H., J. I. 1967. Mamíferos Neotropicales. Universidad del Valle, Departamento de Biología, Cali.

BORRERO H., J. I. 1972. Aves de Caza Colombianas. Universidad del Valle, Departamento de Biología, Cali. (120 especies, ilustrado por Margot Bracholz).

BORRERO H., J. I. 1972. Historia natural de la Garza del Ganado Bubulcus ibis en Colombia. Cespedesia 1:387-479.

BORRERO H., J. I. 1974. Notes on the structure of the upper eyelid of Potoos (Nyctibius). Condor 76:210-240.

OLIVARES, A. 1958. Monografía de los tinamúes colombianos. Revista de la Universidad Nacional de Colombia 23:245-301.
