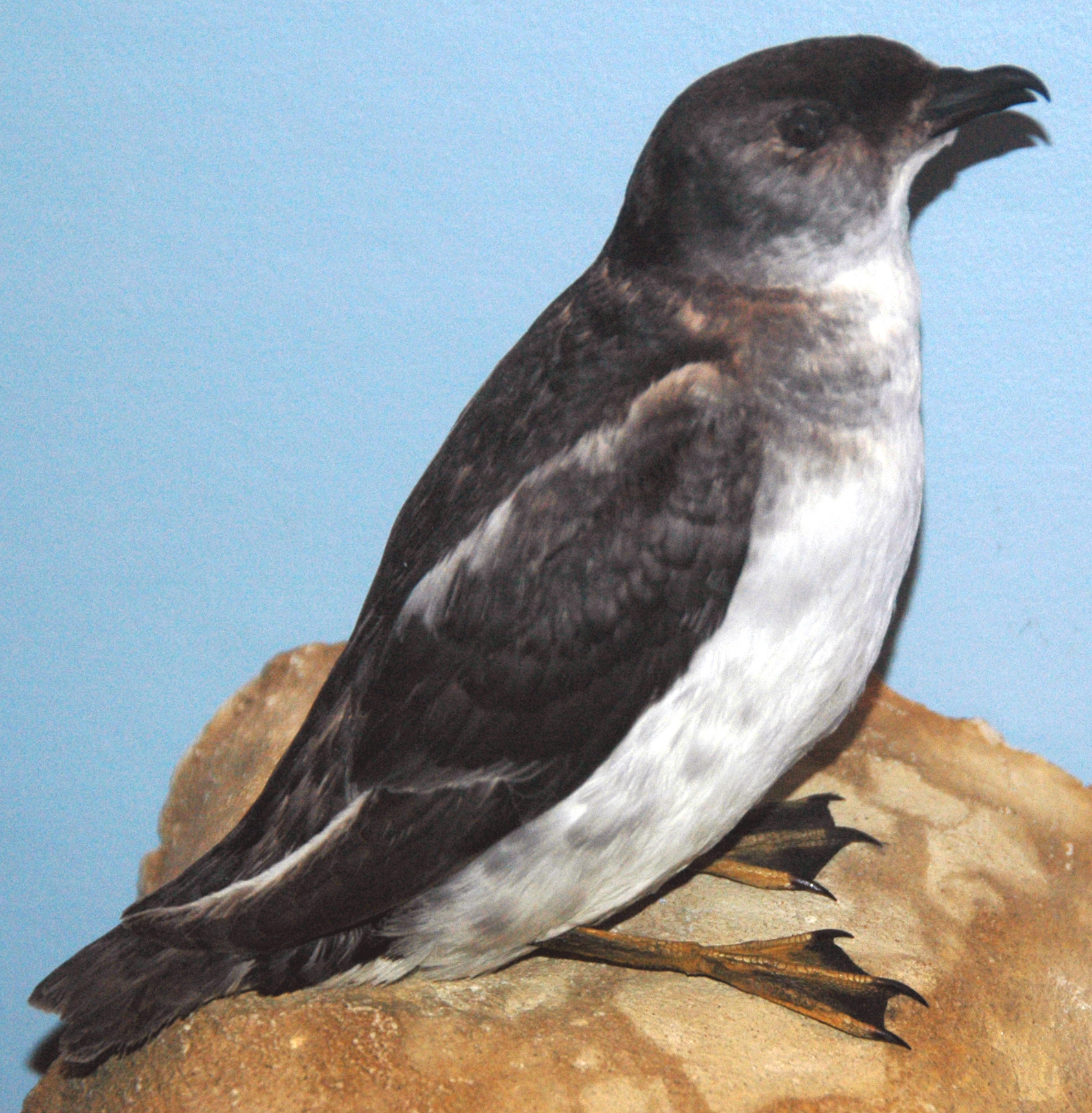

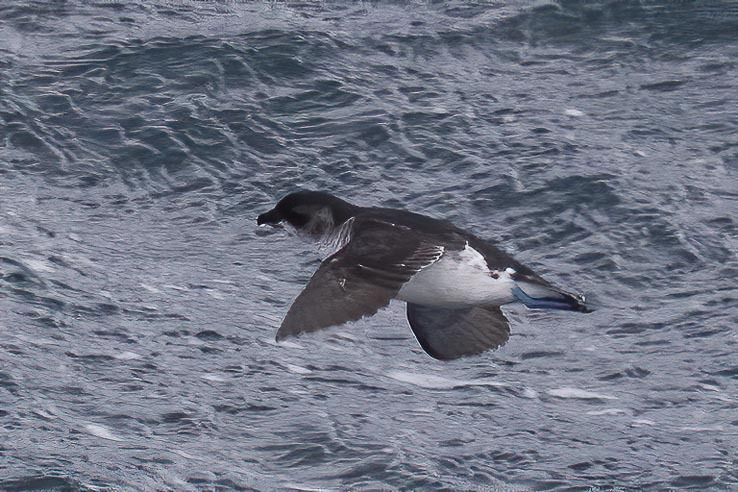

Conservation status
- Least Concern (IUCN 3.1)

Scientific classification
- Kingdom: Animalia
- Phylum: Chordata
- Class: Aves
- Order: Procellariiformes
- Family: Procellariidae
- Genus: Pelecanoides
- Species: P. georgicus

Binomial name
- Pelecanoides georgicus Murphy & Harper, 1916

= South Georgia diving petrel =

Species of bird

The South Georgia diving petrel or Georgian diving-petrel (Pelecanoides georgicus) is one of five very similar small auk-like diving petrels of the southern oceans. It is native to the South Atlantic and islands of the southern Indian Ocean and south-eastern Australia.

== Taxonomy and nomenclature ==
The American ornithologist Robert Cushman Murphy and the zoologist Francis Harper described the South Georgia diving petrel in 1916. Its specific name, georgicus, is derived from the South Georgia islands where they identified the species. Other common names include puffinure de Géorgie du Sud (French), Breitschnabel Lummensturmvogel (German), and potoyunco de Georgia (Spanish). A unique New Zealand population is now considered a separate species, the Whenua Hou diving petrel.

== Description ==
The South Georgia diving petrel is a small, plump petrel, 180 to 220 mm (7.1–8.7 in) in length and weighing around 90 to 150 g (3.2–5.3 oz). Its plumage is black above and dull white below, and it has a stubby black bill with pale blue edges. The wings have thin white strips. The face and neck can be more brown than black. The legs are blue with posterior black lines down the tarsi. Unless seen very close, it is almost indistinguishable from the common diving petrel; the common diving petrel has brown inner web primary feathers, whereas the South Georgia diving petrel has light inner web feathering. Common diving petrels have smaller and narrower bills than the South Georgia diving petrel, and there are also slight size differences.

== Distribution and habitat ==
This species nests in colonies on Subantarctic islands. It breeds on South Georgia in the south Atlantic and on the Prince Edward Islands, Crozet Islands, Kerguelen Islands and Heard Island and McDonald Islands in the southern Indian Ocean. It disperses to surrounding seas and vagrants have been recorded in the Falkland Islands and Australia. While 1.5 m (4.9 ft) nesting burrows are usually built on scree slopes above the vegetation line, they are occasionally built on flat land.

== Behaviour ==
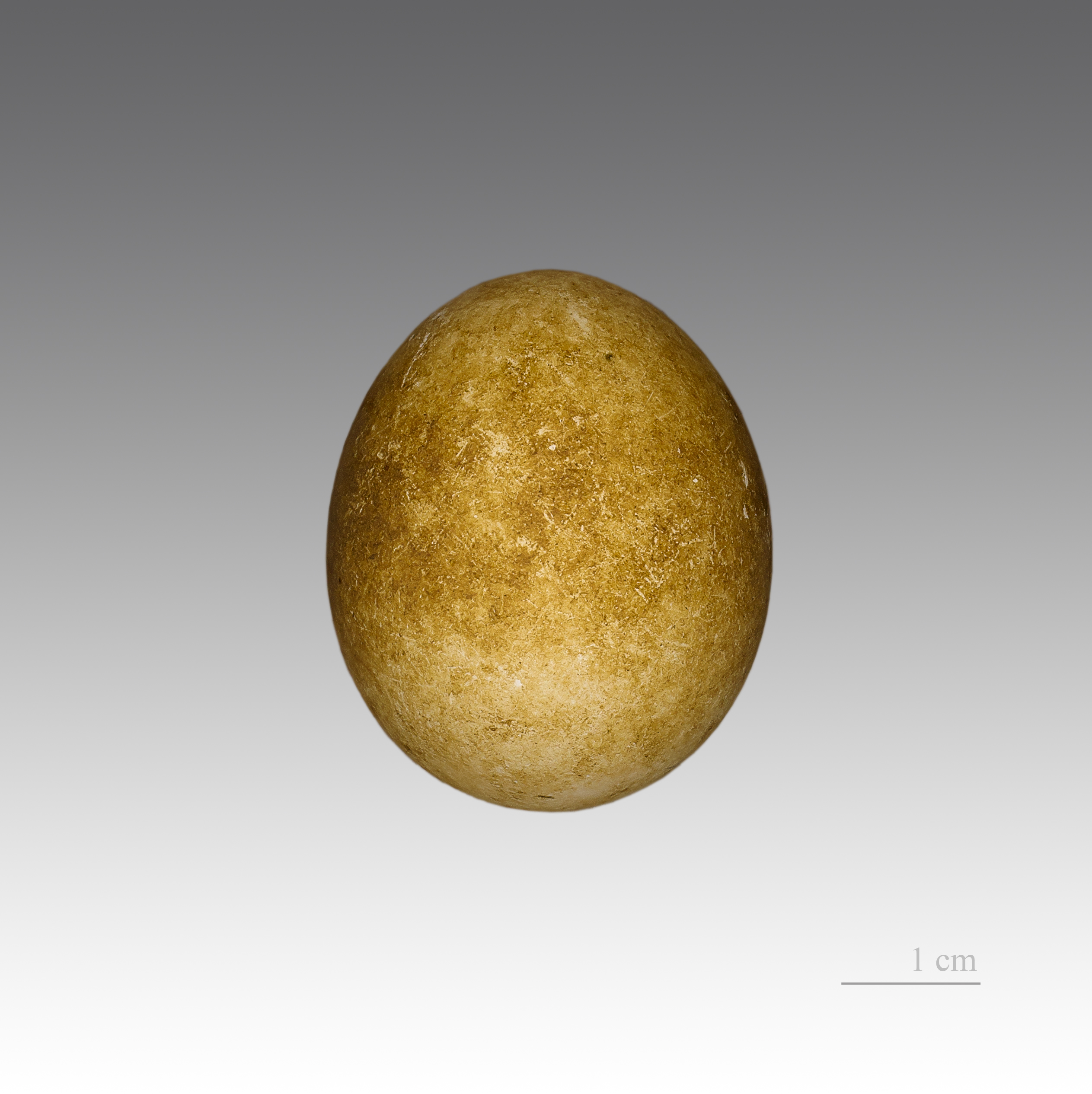
Egg of Pelecanoides georgicus

The South Georgia diving petrel feeds primarily on planktonic crustaceans, particularly krill, but will also feed on small fish and young cephalopods. Breeding season is October–February. The female lays one egg that is incubated for 44–52 days. Fledging occurs in 43–60 days. Threats to the South Georgia diving petrel include skuas, cats and rats. South Georgia diving petrels are noted for their diving capabilities: "The most proficient divers of the order Procellariformes are likely to be the diving petrels in the family Pelecanoididae." Dive depths for the South Georgia diving petrel have been recorded to 48.6 m (159 ft), with most in the range of 20.4 to 24.4 m (67–80 ft).
