= List of shipwrecks in July 1821 =

The list of shipwrecks in July 1821 includes ships sunk, wrecked or otherwise lost during July 1821.

== 1 July ==
List of shipwrecks: 1 July 1821
Ship	State	Description
Speedwell	United Kingdom	The sloop foundered off Kingsbarns, Fife.
Swallow	United Kingdom	The ship was captured by three Moorish vessels whilst on a voyage from Gibraltar to Oran, Algeria. Three of her crew were made prisoners and the vessel was subsequently broken up.

== 2 July ==
List of shipwrecks: 2 July 1821
Ship	State	Description
Autumn	United Kingdom	The ship was driven ashore at "Castalazzo", Kingdom of Lombardy–Venetia. She was on a voyage from Livorno, Grand Duchy of Tuscany to Trieste. Autumn was refloated on 7 July and resumed her voyage.

== 3 July ==
List of shipwrecks: 3 July 1821
Ship	State	Description
John	United Kingdom	The ship foundered in the Bristol Channel off Lundy Island, Devon with the loss of all hands. She was on a voyage from Swansea, Glamorgan to Portreath, Cornwall.

== 4 July ==
List of shipwrecks: 4 July 1821
Ship	State	Description
Laura Ann	United Kingdom	The ship was driven ashore in the Mississippi River.
Three Friends	United Kingdom	The ship struck a rock and foundered off the Isle of Skye. She was on a voyage from Greenock, Renfrewshire to Saint Petersburg, Russia.

== 9 July ==
List of shipwrecks: 9 July 1821
Ship	State	Description
Bridgewater	United Kingdom	The ship was in the Indian Ocean bound for China, No further trace, presumed foundered with the loss of all hands.
Phatisalam	India	The ship was beached on Hunter Island, Tasmania. All on board survived. The wreck was burnt in mid-October.

== 13 July ==
List of shipwrecks: 13 July 1821
Ship	State	Description
Estelle	France	The ship foundered off the coast of Cuba. Her crew were rescued.

== 15 July ==
List of shipwrecks: 15 July 1821
Ship	State	Description
Harriet	United Kingdom	The ship ran aground at Richibucto, New Brunswick, British North America. She was on a voyage from Richibucto to Liverpool, Lancashire.
Phœnix	United Kingdom	The ship was driven ashore and wrecked at Belford, Northumberland. Her crew were rescued. She was on a voyage from York to Newcastle upon Tyne, Northumberland.

== 17 July ==
List of shipwrecks: 17 July 1821
Ship	State	Description
Enigheid	Russia	The ship was destroyed by fire at Bordeaux, Gironde, France.
Jupiter	United Kingdom	The ship was driven ashore and damaged at Calcutta, India.

== 18 July ==
List of shipwrecks: 18 July 1821
Ship	State	Description
Ceres	(United Kingdom of Great Britain and Ireland) Jersey	The ship was lost on the Triangles. She was on a voyage from British Honduras to Jersey. Her crew were rescued.
Eclair	United Kingdom	The ship caught fire at Gibraltar and was scuttled.

== 19 July ==
List of shipwrecks: 19 July 1821
Ship	State	Description
Frieda	Prussia	The ship ran aground on the Shipwash Sand, in the North Sea off the coast of Essex, United Kingdom. She was on a voyage from Memel to London, United Kingdom. Frieda was later refloated and taken in to Harwich, Essex.

== 21 July ==
List of shipwrecks: 21 July 1821
Ship	State	Description
Blenden Hall	United Kingdom	The ship was wrecked on Inaccessible Island with the loss of two of her crew. She was on a voyage from London to Bombay, India

== 25 July ==
List of shipwrecks: 25 July 1821
Ship	State	Description
Kitty	United Kingdom	The ship was driven ashore at Silecroft, Cumberland. Her crew were rescued. She was on a voyage from Whitehaven, Cumberland to the River Duddon.

== 26 July ==
List of shipwrecks: 26 July 1821
Ship	State	Description
British King	United Kingdom	The ship was wrecked on Anticosti Island, Quebec, British North America. Her crew were rescued. She was on a voyage from Quebec to Belfast, County Antrim.

== 29 July ==
List of shipwrecks: 29 July 1821
Ship	State	Description
Hero	United Kingdom	The ship foundered off St. Anns Head, Pembrokeshire. Her crew were rescued by Testshill (United Kingdom). Hero was on a voyage from Kidwelly, Carmarthenshire to Pembroke.

== Unknown date ==
List of shipwrecks: Unknown date in July 1821
Ship	State	Description
Biene	Stettin	The ship was driven ashore near "Nordingen". She was on a voyage from Stettin to Havre de Grâce, Seine-Inférieure, France.
Duke of Bedford	United Kingdom	The ship was wrecked 3 leagues (9 nautical miles (17 km)) east of Cape St. Antonio, Jamaica. Six crew were rescued by Mary (United Kingdom). She was on a voyage from Jamaica to London.
Eclipse	United Kingdom	The full-rigged ship was lost in the Hooghly River on the "Mizen", between "Kegeree" and "Sauger" a few days before 15 July. She was on a voyage from Calcutta, India to London via the Cape of Good Hope.
San Martín	Chilean Navy	The 64-gun third rate ship of the line sank off Chorrilos, Peru. Crew saved but cargo of silver mostly lost.
Urania	United Kingdom	The ship was driven ashore near The Lizard, Cornwall. She was on a voyage from Bahia, Brazil to Hamburg. Urania was refloated on 14 November and taken in to Falmouth, Cornwall
