= Bears Island (Tasmania) =

Island in Tasmania, Australia

Coordinates: 40°26′S 144°50′E

Bears Island is a small island with an area of 0.34 ha, lying off the north-west tip of Three Hummock Island in Bass Strait, south-eastern Australia. It is part of Tasmania’s Hunter Island Group which lies between north-west Tasmania and King Island.

== Fauna ==
Breeding seabirds and shorebirds include little penguin, common diving-petrel, Pacific gull and sooty oystercatcher.
