= Mewstone =

Island in Tasmania, Australia

Nickname: Mewstone Island; The Mewstone
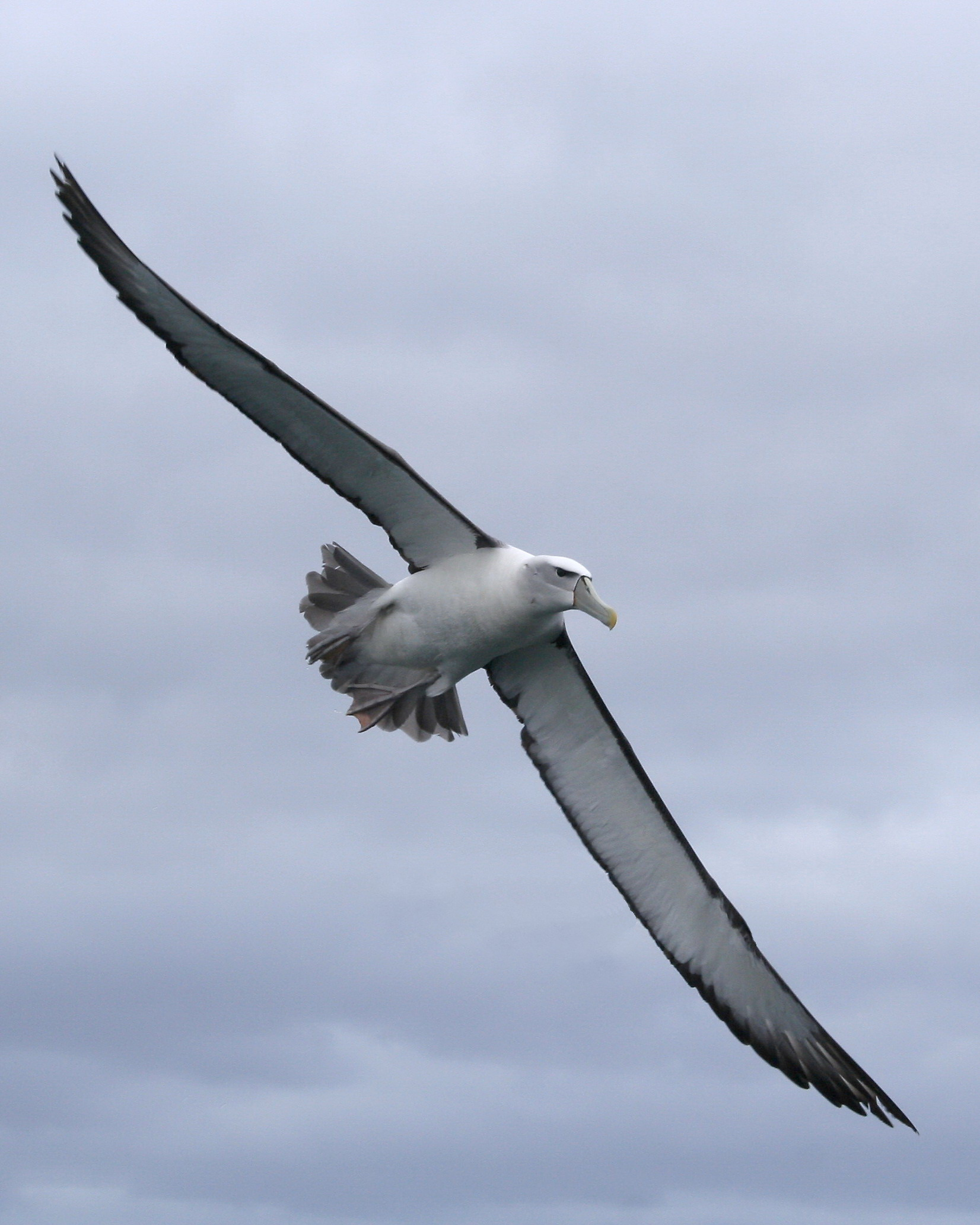
- Mewstone is an important breeding site for shy albatrosses

- Location within Tasmania
- Etymology: Great Mew Stone, an island near Plymouth, United Kingdom

Geography
- Location: South coast Tasmania
- Coordinates: 43°44′17″S 146°22′16″E
- Archipelago: Pedra Branca
- Adjacent to: Southern Ocean
- Area: 13.1 ha (32 acres)
- Highest elevation: 150 m (490 ft)

Administration
- Australia
- State: Tasmania
- Region: South coast

Demographics
- Population: Unpopulated

Mewstone is an unpopulated island, composed of muscovite granite, located close to the south coast of Tasmania, Australia. The 13.1-hectare (32-acre) island has steep cliffs and a small flat summit and is part of the Pedra Branca group, lying 12 kilometres (7.5 mi) southeast of Maatsuyker Island, and 22 kilometres (14 mi) off the south coast of Tasmania. Mewstone comprises part of the Southwest National Park and the Tasmanian Wilderness World Heritage Site.

The highest point of the island is approximately 150 metres (490 ft) above sea level. Mewstone has abundant bird life and has been identified by BirdLife International as an Important Bird Area (IBA) because it supports over 1% of the world populations of shy albatrosses and fairy prions.

== Etymology ==
In 1642 it was described by Abel Tasman, who said it "resembles a lion". In 1773 it was named by Tobias Furneaux in HMS Adventure. It is likely that Mewstone was named after the Great Mew Stone, an island about 8 kilometres (5.0 mi) south-southeast of Furneaux's birthplace in Plymouth, United Kingdom. The Great Mewstone got its name from the old English name for the herring gull; mew.

Although it is sometimes referred to as Mewstone Island or The Mewstone, its official name is simply Mewstone.

== Flora and fauna ==
There is very little flora due to the rocky nature of the island. What little plant life there is grows in crevices in the rocks where soil has accumulated.

Recorded breeding seabirds include fairy prion (20,000 pairs), silver gull, black-faced cormorant and shy albatross (7,500 pairs). Mewstone is the largest of only three shy albatross breeding colonies in the world, the other two being Albatross Island and Pedra Branca. Australian fur seals haul-out on small ledges. The Tasmanian tree skink is also present.

== See also ==
- List of islands of Tasmania
- South East Cape
- South West Cape
