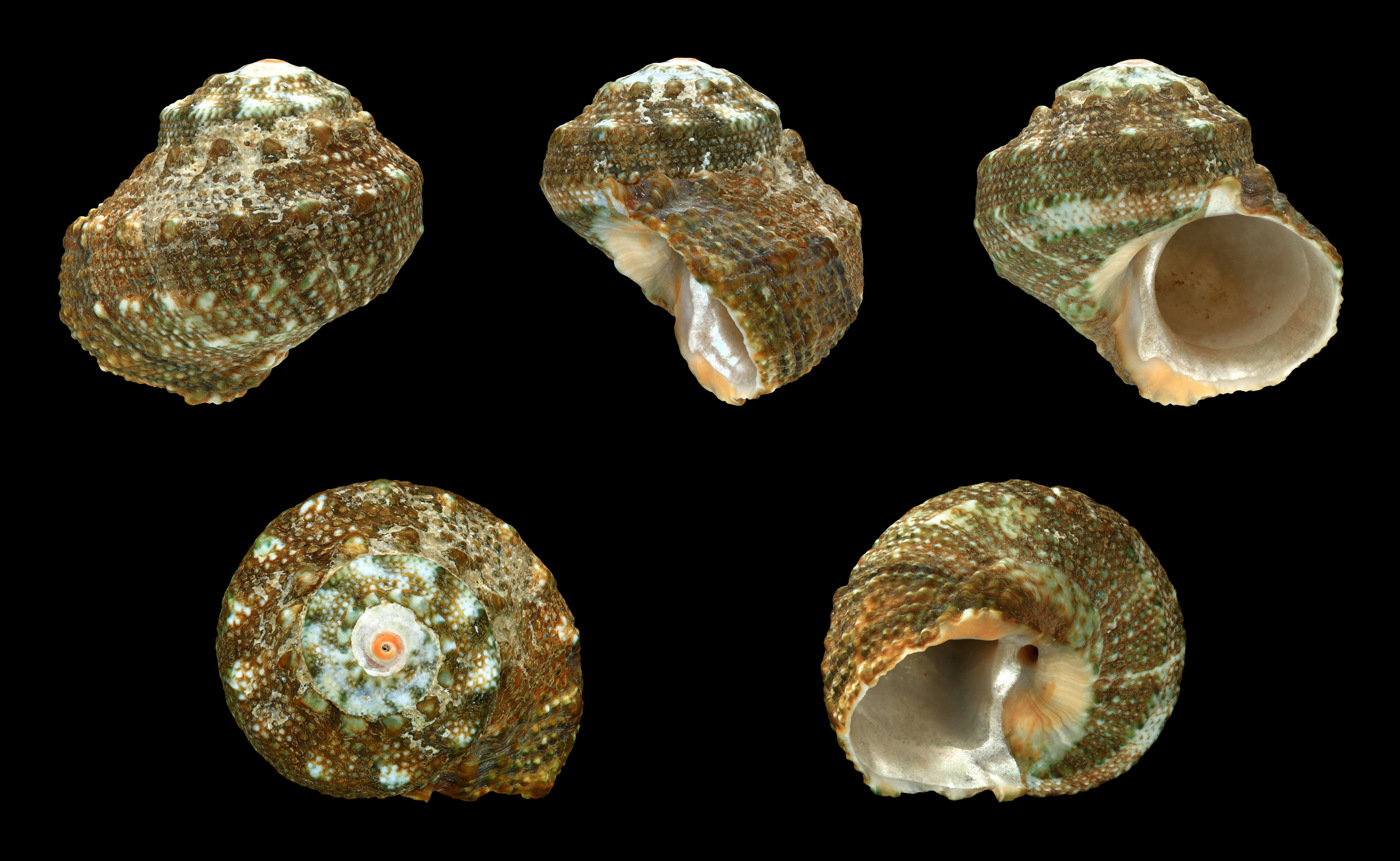

Scientific classification
- Kingdom: Animalia
- Phylum: Mollusca
- Class: Gastropoda
- Subclass: Vetigastropoda
- Order: Trochida
- Superfamily: Trochoidea
- Family: Turbinidae
- Genus: Lunella
- Species: L. correensis

Binomial name
- Lunella correensis (Récluz, 1853)

Synonyms
- Lunella coreensis (Récluz, 1853); Lunella coronata correensis (Récluz, 1853); Turbo (Lunella) coronatus coreensis (Récluz, 1853); Turbo correensis Récluz, 1853

= Lunella correensis =

Species of gastropod

Lunella correensis is a species of sea snail, a marine gastropod mollusk, in the subfamily Turbininae of the family Turbinidae, the turban snails.

== Description ==
The size of the shell varies between 12 mm and 27 mm. The shell is similar to Lunella granulata, but is imperforate.

== Distribution ==
This marine species occurs in the Northwest Pacific, especially off Korea and Japan.
