= Turbo versicolor =

Turbo versicolor can be:

- Turbo versicolor Gmelin, 1791 is a synonym of Lunella cinerea (Born, 1778)
- Turbo versicolor Usticke, 1959 is a synonym of Turbo castanea Gmelin, 1791
