= Edwards Islet (Tasmania) =

Island in Tasmania, Australia

Coordinates: 40°36′S 144°47′E

Edwards Islet is a small island with an area of 0.58 ha in Bass Strait, south-eastern Australia. It is part of Tasmania’s Hunter Island Group which lies between north-west Tasmania and King Island.

== Fauna ==
Breeding seabirds and shorebirds include little penguin, short-tailed shearwater, common diving-petrel, Pacific gull, silver gull, sooty oystercatcher and Caspian tern.
