= Dugay Islet =

Island in Tasmania, Australia

Coordinates: 40°36′S 144°46′E

Dugay Islet is a small island with an area of 0.44 ha in Bass Strait, north-western Tasmania.

It is part of Tasmania's Hunter Island Group which lies between north-west Tasmania and King Island.

== Fauna ==
Breeding seabirds and shorebirds include little penguin, short-tailed shearwater, common diving-petrel, Pacific gull and sooty oystercatcher.
