= Lunella moniliformis =

Scientific classification
- Kingdom: Animalia
- Phylum: Mollusca
- Class: Gastropoda
- Subclass: Vetigastropoda
- Order: Trochida
- Family: Turbinidae
- Genus: Lunella
- Species: L. moniliformis

Binomial name
- Lunella moniliformis Röding, 1798

Synonyms
- Turbo (Lunella) moniliformis (Röding, 1798); Turbo moniliformis (Röding, 1798)

Species of gastropod

Lunella moniliformis is a species of sea snail, a marine gastropod mollusk in the family Turbinidae, the turban snails.

This species is sometimes considered a synonym of Lunella granulata Gmelin, J.F., 1791

== Description ==
The length of the shell varies between 20 mm and 25 mm.

== Distribution ==
This marine species occurs off Vietnam.

== Notes ==
Additional information regarding this species:

- Taxonomic status: Some authors place the name in the subgenus Turbo (Lunella)
