= Black Pyramid Rock =

Nature reserve in Bass Strait, Australia

Coordinates: 40°28′S 144°21′E

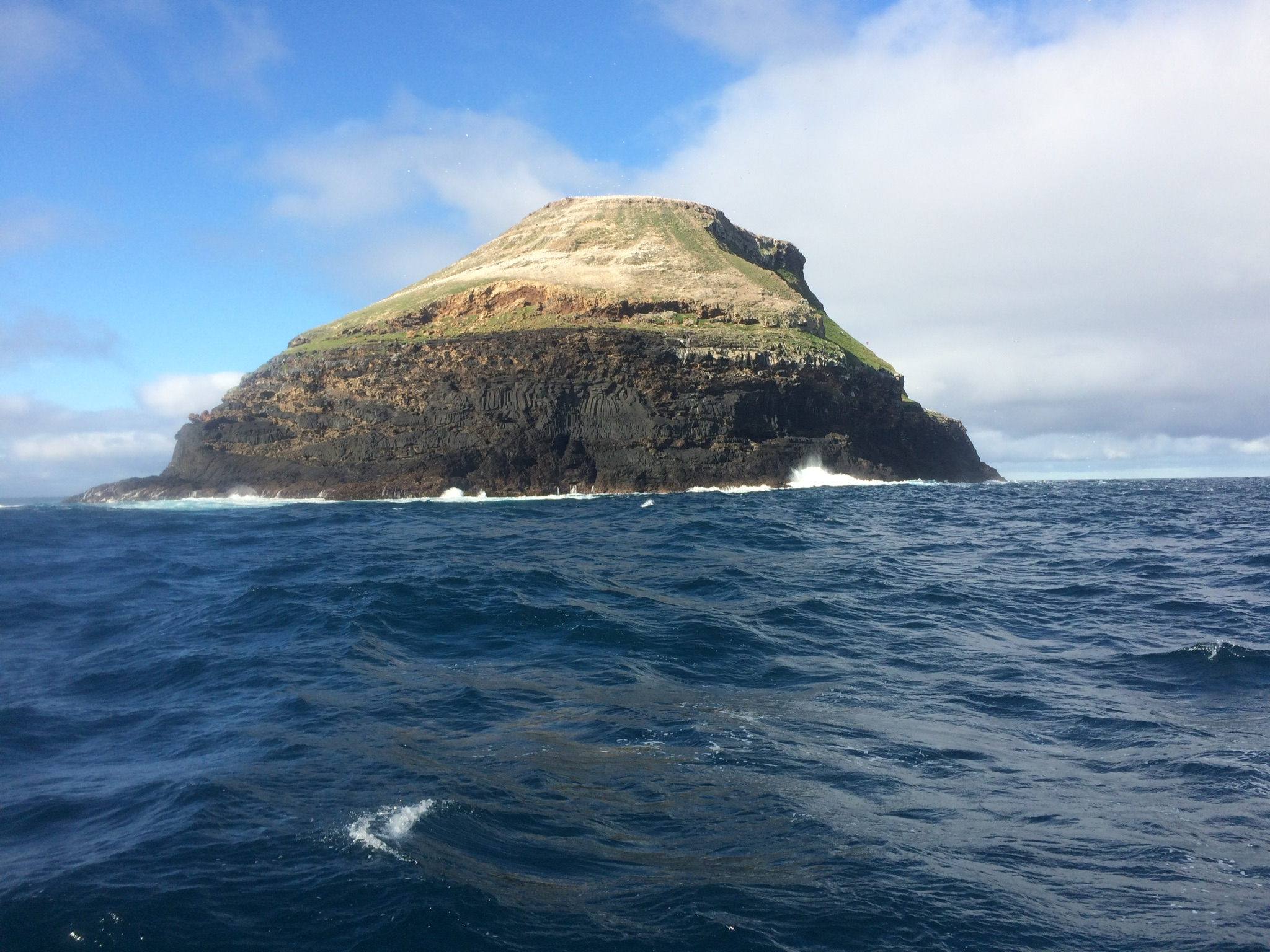
Black Pyramid Rock from the west

Black Pyramid Rock is an island nature reserve, with an area of 40 ha, in Bass Strait, south-eastern Australia. It is part of Tasmania’s Hunter Island Group which lies between north-west Tasmania and King Island. It is part of the Albatross Island and Black Pyramid Rock Important Bird Area. It is notable for its Australasian gannet colony which, at over 12,000 pairs, is the largest in Tasmania and supports about 20% of the world population of the species.

== Fauna ==
Apart from the gannets, breeding seabirds and shorebirds include little penguin, short-tailed shearwater, fairy prion (up to 340,000 breeding pairs), common diving-petrel (up to 200,000 breeding pairs), Pacific gull, silver gull and sooty oystercatcher. The only reptile recorded is White's skink. The island is used occasionally as a haul-out site by Australian fur seals.

== Geology ==
Black Pyramid Rock is a Tertiary basaltic volcanic rocks.
