= Nares Rocks =

Coordinates: 40°35′S 144°41′E

Nares Rocks are a group of three rocks with a total area of 0.76 ha in Bass Strait, part of Tasmania’s Hunter Island Group and lie between north-west Tasmania and King Island. They are steep and largely bare of vegetation.

== Fauna ==
Breeding seabirds and shorebirds include common diving-petrel, Pacific gull, silver gull, sooty oystercatcher and black-faced cormorant.
