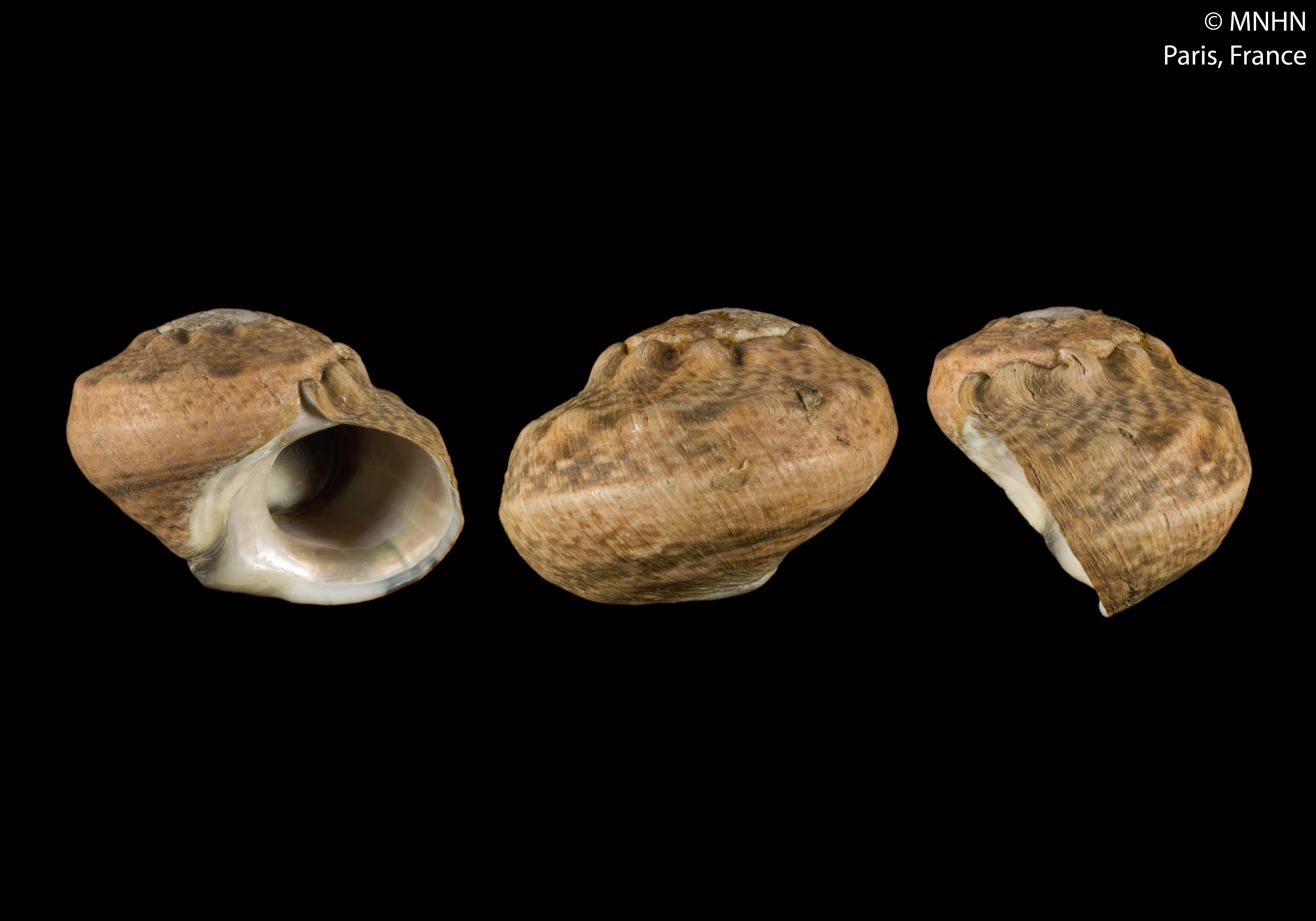
- Shell of Lunella viridicallus (syntype at MNHN, Paris)

Scientific classification
- Kingdom: Animalia
- Phylum: Mollusca
- Class: Gastropoda
- Subclass: Vetigastropoda
- Order: Trochida
- Family: Turbinidae
- Genus: Lunella
- Species: L. viridicallus

Binomial name
- Lunella viridicallus (Jousseaume, 1892)

Synonyms
- Turbo viridicallus (Jousseaume, 1892); Turbo (Lunella) viridicallus Jousseaume, 1892

= Lunella viridicallus =

Species of gastropod

Lunella viridicallus is a species of sea snail, a marine gastropod mollusk in the family Turbinidae, the turban snails.

== Description ==
The length of the shell attains 3.2 mm.

== Distribution ==
This species occurs in the Red Sea.
