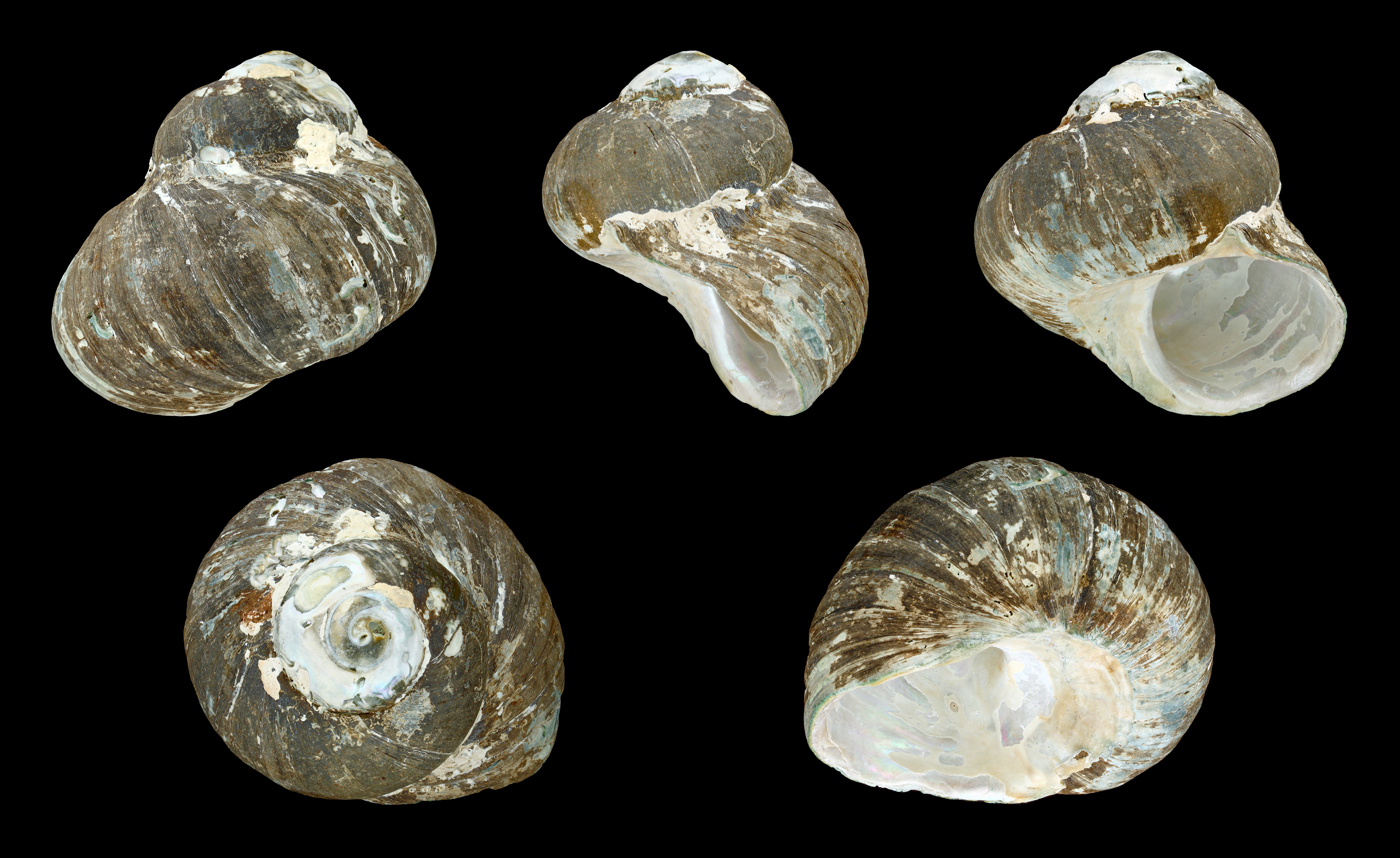
- A shell of an adult Lunella smaragda
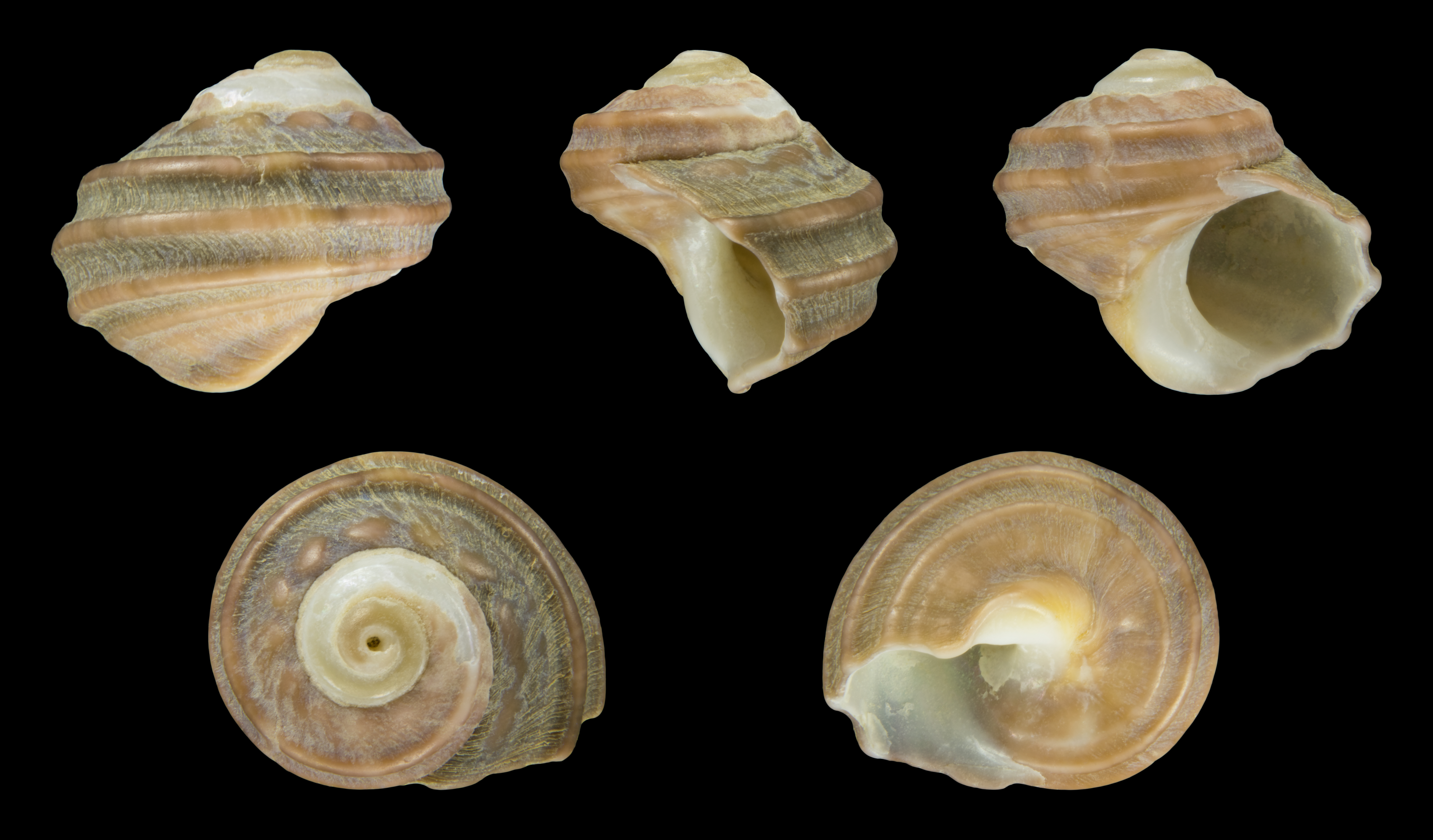
- A shell of a juvenile Lunella smaragda

Scientific classification
- Kingdom: Animalia
- Phylum: Mollusca
- Class: Gastropoda
- Subclass: Vetigastropoda
- Order: Trochida
- Family: Turbinidae
- Genus: Lunella
- Species: L. smaragda

Binomial name
- Lunella smaragda (Gmelin, 1791)

Synonyms
- Turbo helicinus Born, 1780; Turbo radina Webster, 1905; Turbo (Turbo) smaragdus Gmelin, 1791; Turbo smaragdus Gmelin, 1791; Turbo tricostatus Hutton, 1884

= Lunella smaragda =

Species of gastropod

Lunella smaragda, common name the cat's eye snail, is a species of sea snail, a marine gastropod mollusk in the family Turbinidae, the turban snails.

There has been little published on this species.

== Description ==
This species has a green operculum. The size of the shell varies between 35 mm and 70 mm.

The depressed, imperforate, solid shell has a heliciform shape. It is covered with a strong blackish cuticle, beneath which it is green. It is usually eroded at the apex and contains 4 to 5 whorls. The upper ones are spirally sulcate or carinate. The body whorl is large, flattened above, with incremental wrinkles and subobsolete spiral sulci. The large aperture is oblique, rounded, pearly white within. The outer lip is thin and black-edged. The arched columella has a pearly callus. The white umbilico-parietal area is excavated and concave.

The common name "cat's eye" for the synonym Turbo smaragdus is a reference to the attractively colored operculum of this species, which looks somewhat like an eye, and which is sometimes used for decorative purposes. The operculum is flat inside with four whorls. The nucleus is more than one-third the distance across the face. The outside is deep green except on the side of increment which is white. It is very minutely remotely granose.

== Distribution ==
Lunella smaragda is an endemic species found both at the intertidal and low subtidal rocky shores and soft substrates (including seaweeds) of New Zealand. It is found around the North, South, and Stewart islands, on rocks between low and mid tide.
