= Albatross Island (Tasmania) =

Island in Tasmania, Australia

Albatross Island (Tangatema)
- Location within Tasmania

Geography
- Location: Bass Strait
- Coordinates: 40°23′S 144°39′E
- Archipelago: Hunter Island Group
- Area: 18 ha (44 acres)

Administration
- Australia
- State: Tasmania

The Albatross Island, part of the Hunter Island Group, is an 18-hectare (44-acre) island and nature reserve located in Bass Strait, that lies between north-west Tasmania and King Island, Australia. The Peerapper name for the island is Tangatema.

The island is part of the Albatross Island and Black Pyramid Rock Important Bird Area that is notable for its breeding colony of 5,000 pairs of shy albatross, some 40% of the world population of the species.

== Fauna ==
Apart from shy albatross, breeding seabirds and shorebirds include little penguin, short-tailed shearwater, fairy prion, Pacific gull, silver gull and sooty oystercatcher. A pair of white-bellied sea eagles usually nests there annually. The island is visited regularly by Australian fur seals and New Zealand fur seals. Reptiles include the metallic skink and Tasmanian tree skink.

== See also ==
- List of islands of Tasmania
