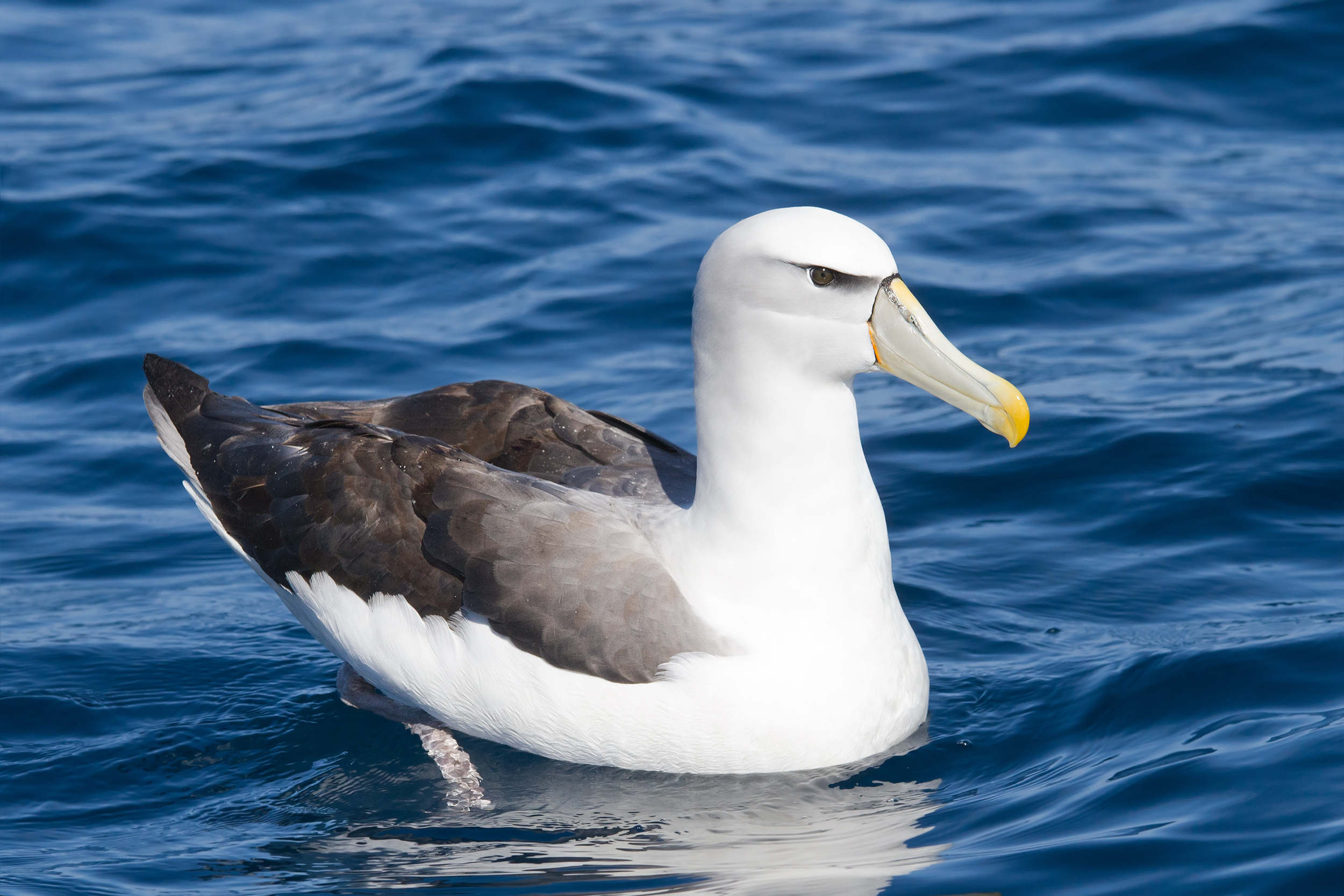

Conservation status
- Near Threatened (IUCN 3.1)

Scientific classification
- Kingdom: Animalia
- Phylum: Chordata
- Class: Aves
- Order: Procellariiformes
- Family: Diomedeidae
- Genus: Thalassarche
- Species: T. cauta

Binomial name
- Thalassarche cauta (Gould, 1841)

Synonyms
- Diomedea cauta

= Shy albatross =

Species of bird

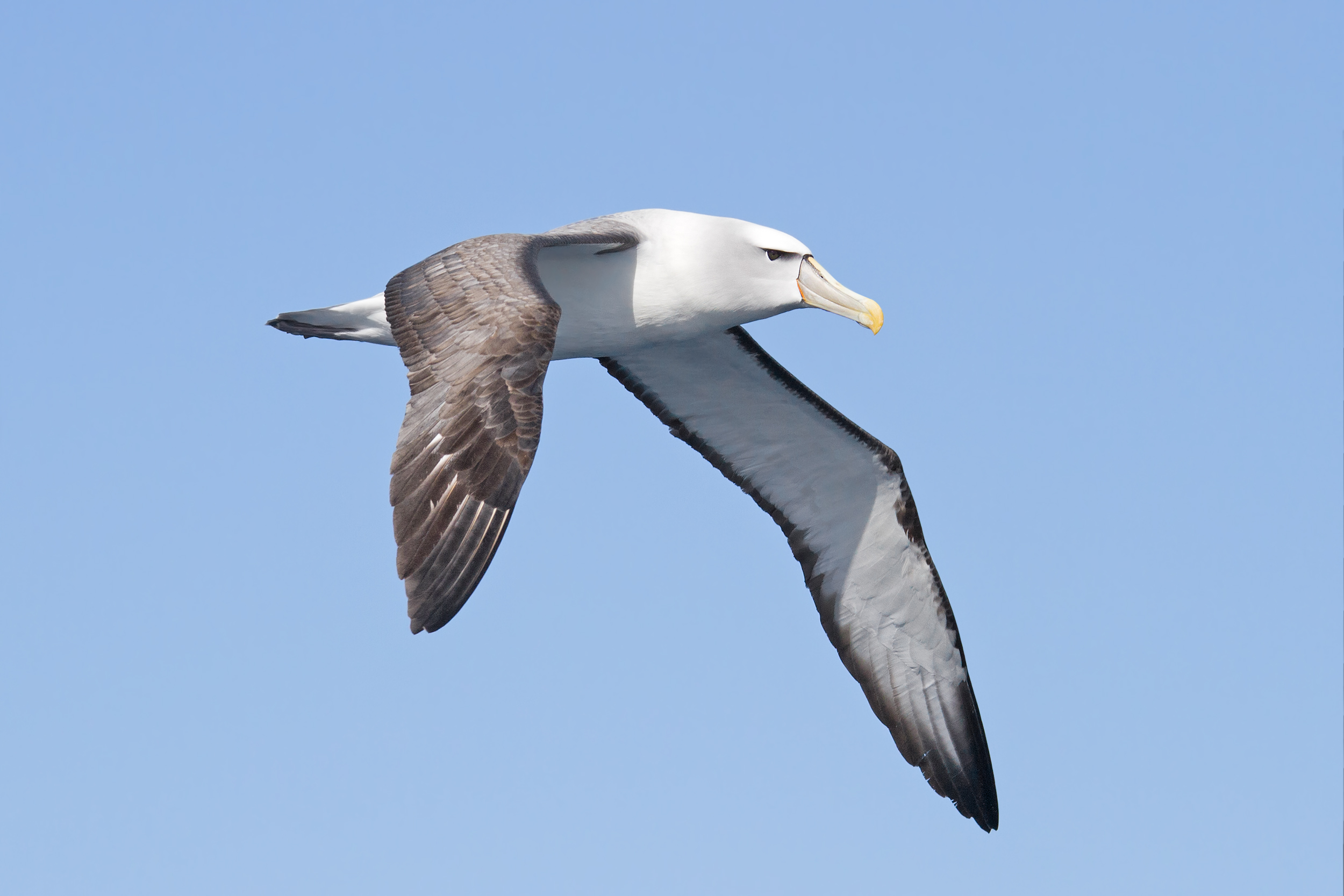
Over pelagic waters off the southeast coast of Tasmania

The shy albatross (Thalassarche cauta), also known as the shy mollymawk, is a medium-sized albatross that breeds on three remote islands off the coast of Tasmania, Australia, in the southern Indian Ocean. Its lifespan is about 60 years, and it has been seen as far afield as South Africa and the Pacific coast of the United States. As of June 2020, the species is listed as "Endangered" in Australia; there are thought to be 15,000 pairs of shy albatross left. It is Australia's only endemic albatross.

Some authorities call this species the white-capped albatross, but that name is more commonly applied to Thalassarche cauta steadi.

== Taxonomy ==
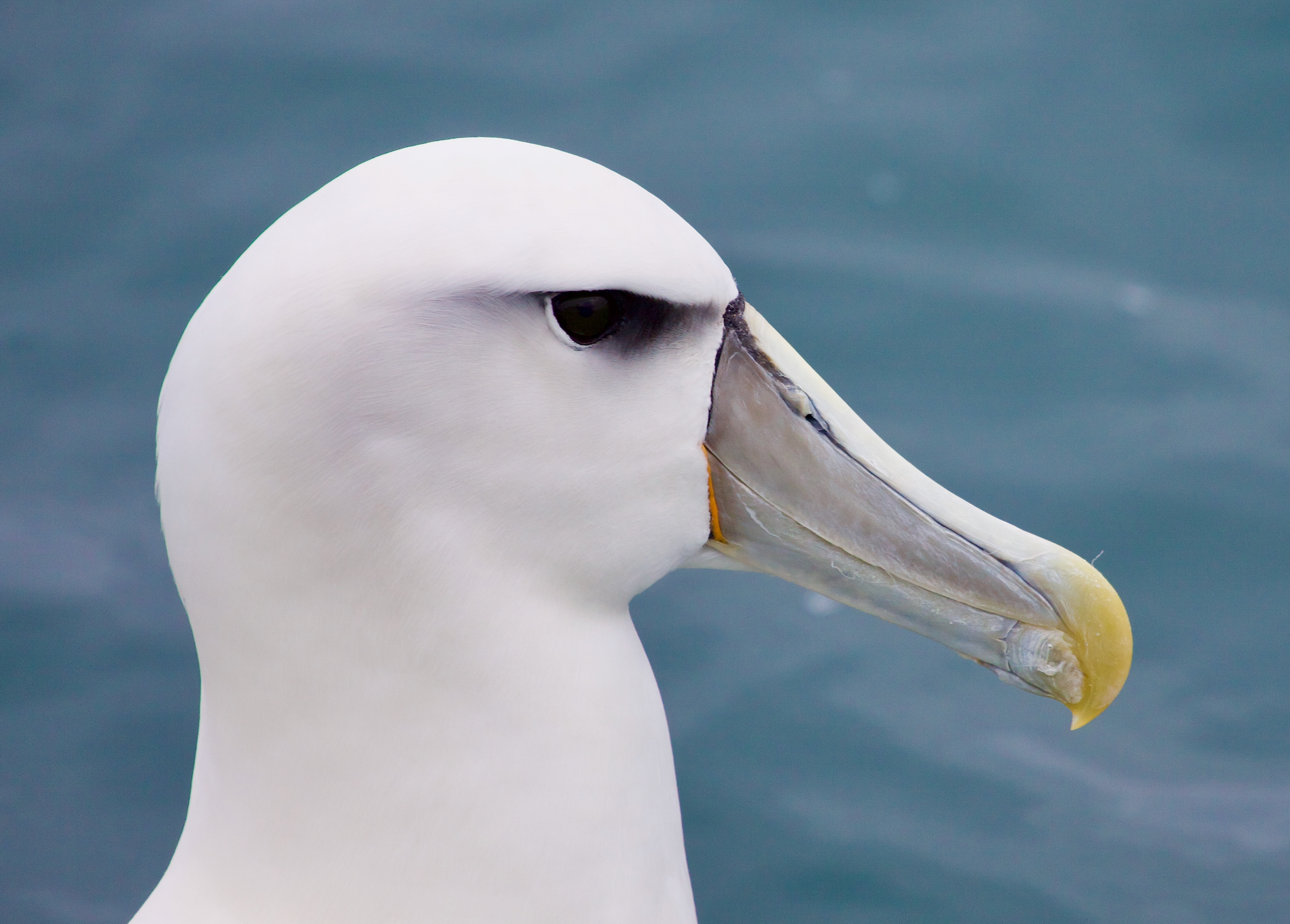
Thalassarche cauta steadi

This mollymawk was once considered to be the same species as the Salvin's albatross, Thalassarche salvini, and the Chatham albatross, Thalassarche eremita, but they were split around 2004. In 1998, Robertson and Nunn suggested a four-way split including the white-capped albatross, Thalassarche steadi. The three-way split was accepted by Brooke in 2004, the ACAP in 2006, SACC in 2008, and BirdLife International by 2000. James Clements was the last major holdout on the three-way split but later accepted it. The fourth split, steadi, was only accepted by the ACAP in 2006, and BirdLife International in 2008. Finally, following Brooke, this species was shifted from Diomedea to Thalassarche, which was generally agreed upon by most experts.

Some authorities, notably the American Ornithological Society, call this species the white-capped albatross.

Mollymawks belong to the albatross family, Diomedeidae, which shares the order Procellariiformes with shearwaters, fulmars, storm petrels, and diving petrels. Procellariiformes have certain identifying features. They have nasal passages that attach to the upper bill, called naricorns (although the nostrils on the albatross are on the sides of the bill). The bills are also unique in that they are split into between seven and nine horny plates. They produce a stomach oil made up of wax esters and triglycerides that is stored in the proventriculus. This is used against predators as well as an energy-rich food source for chicks and for the adults during their long flights. They also have a salt gland that is situated above the nasal passage and helps desalinate their bodies, required due to the high amount of ocean water that they imbibe. It excretes a high saline solution from their nose.

Within Australia, the bird is still shown as Diomedea cauta, Diomedea cauta cauta, or Thalassarche cauta cauta in some legislation and databases.

== Description ==
The shy albatross averages 90 to 99 cm (35–39 in) in length, 220 to 256 cm (87–101 in) wingspan, and 4.1 kg (9.0 lb) in weight. Alongside its similarly sized sister species, the Salvin's albatross, this species is considered the largest of the mollymawks or the small albatrosses. It is a black, white and slate-grey bird with the characteristic black thumb mark at the base of the leading edge of the underwing. Adults have a white forehead and a crown, which is bordered on the bottom with a dark eyebrow and pale grey face. Its mantle, tail and upperwing are grey-black, and the rest is white. Its bill is grey-yellow with a prominent yellow culmen and yellow tip.

It has a lifespan of about 60 years.

== Behaviour ==
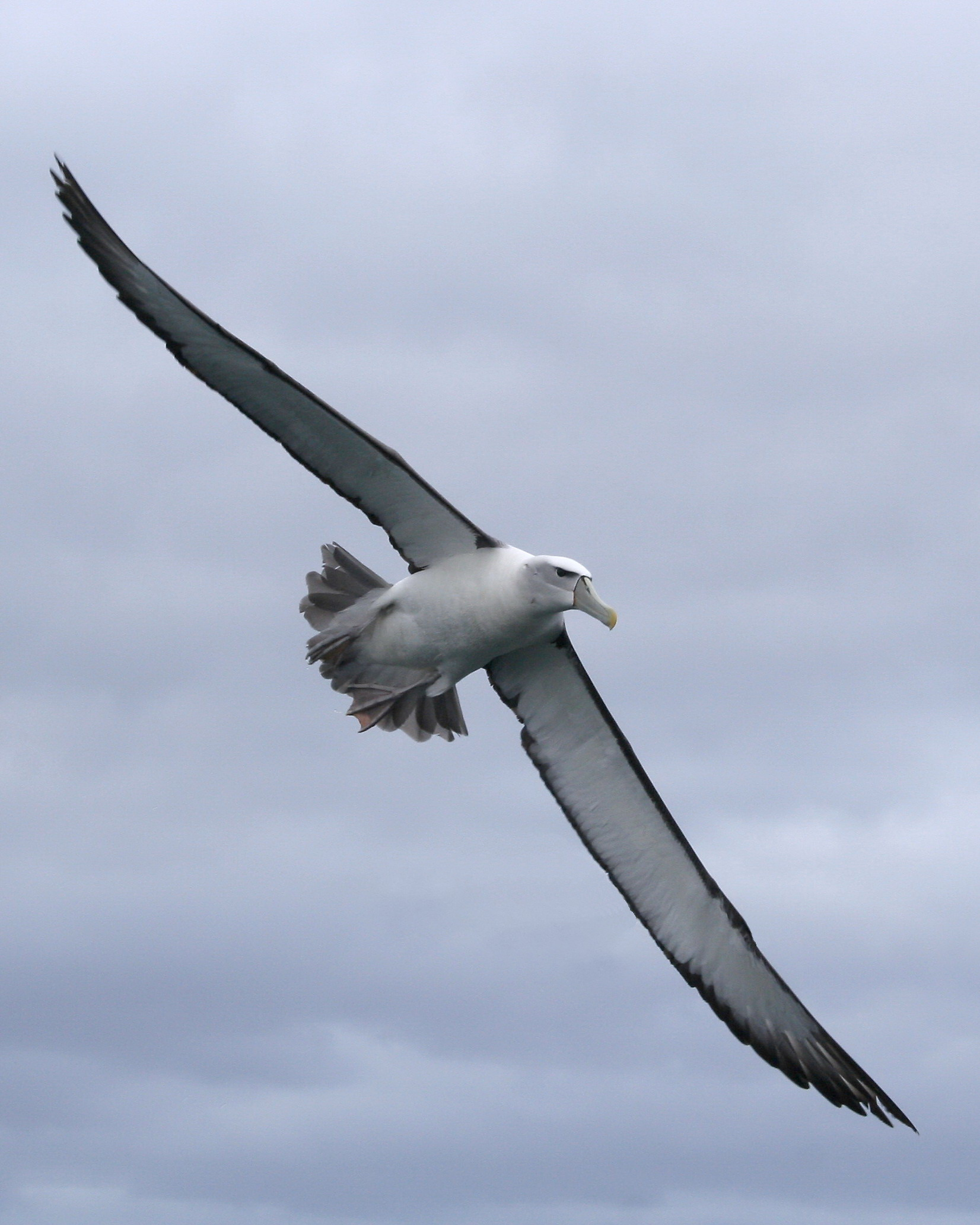
Shy albatross frequently follow fishing boats

=== Feeding ===
The shy albatross feeds by a combination surface-seizing and some pursuit diving – it has been recorded diving as deep as 5 m (16 ft). Fish, cephalopods, crustacea, and tunicates are the sustenance for this species.

=== Reproduction ===
The shy albatross breeds on rocky islands and builds mounded nests of soil, grass, and roots. They lay one egg in the second half of September.

=== Flight endurance ===
Some shy albatross are able to fly 1,000 kilometres (620 mi) in 24 hours.

== Range and habitat ==
Breeding population and trends
Location	Population	Date	Trend
Albatross Island	5,017 pairs	2007	Increasing 3% per yr
Mewstone	7,258 — 7,458 pairs	1996	
Pedra Branca	268 pairs	1996	Decreasing 10% per yr
Total	26,000	2007	Unknown

The shy albatross is endemic breeder to Australia and it breeds on three island colonies off Tasmania, in the southern Indian Ocean: Albatross Island, Pedra Branca, and the Mewstone. It is the only albatross endemic to Australia.

Juvenile birds are known to fly as far as South Africa; otherwise, non-breeding birds can be found throughout the southern oceans, but specifics are hard to determine due to their similarity to the other species. It is sometimes found off the Pacific coast of the United States.

== Conservation ==
The IUCN classifies this species as near threatened, with an occurrence range of 23,900,000 km^{2} (9,200,000 sq mi). The population from an estimate in 2007 was 25,500 breeding birds with 5,100 pairs on Albatross Island, 270 pairs on Pedra Branca, and 7,380 on the Mewstone. Historically, they were exploited for their feathers, and by 1909 there were only 300 pairs left on Albatross Island.

Today, longline fishing still impacts this species but their numbers have been maintained despite this threat. They also had an avian pox outbreak on Albatross Island that has impacted their numbers slightly. Finally, the Australasian gannet, Morus serrator is the primary threat to their survival.

In June 2020, the Australian Government changed the status of the bird under the Environment Protection and Biodiversity Conservation Act 1999 from "Vulnerable" to "Endangered", with the bird facing the main threats from climate change and fisheries (as bycatch victims, either caught in trawling nets, or on hooks in the longline fishing industry), as well as disease and competition with other seabirds. The change in status is not considered to be due to poor management. Listings under state and territory legislation were mostly still "vulnerable" at this time.

The bird can only be monitored on Albatross Island, as the other two islands are inaccessible, but there are thought to be 15,000 pairs of shy albatross left.
