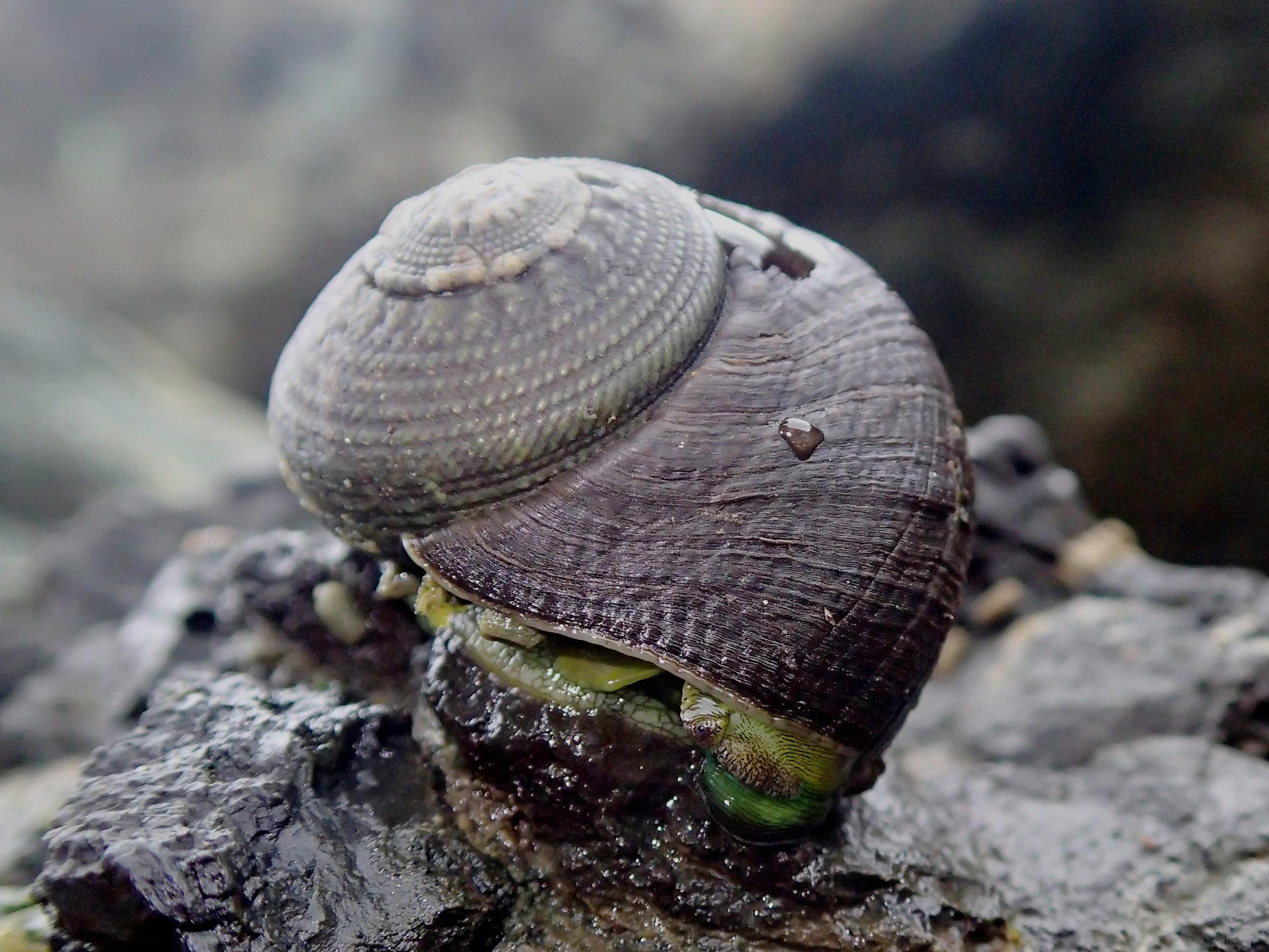

Scientific classification
- Kingdom: Animalia
- Phylum: Mollusca
- Class: Gastropoda
- Subclass: Vetigastropoda
- Order: Trochida
- Family: Turbinidae
- Genus: Lunella
- Species: L. ogasawarana

Binomial name
- Lunella ogasawarana Tomoyuki Nakano, Kyoko Takashashi & Tomowo Ozawa, 2007

Synonyms
- Turbo lugubris Kiener, 1847 (Invalid: junior homonym of Turbo lugubris Link, 1807)

= Lunella ogasawarana =

Species of gastropod

Lunella ogasawarana is a species of sea snail, a marine gastropod mollusc in the family Turbinidae, the turban snails.

== Etymology ==
The species name ‘ogasawarana’ is given to highlight its endemicity in Ogasawara Islands, Japan.

== Description ==
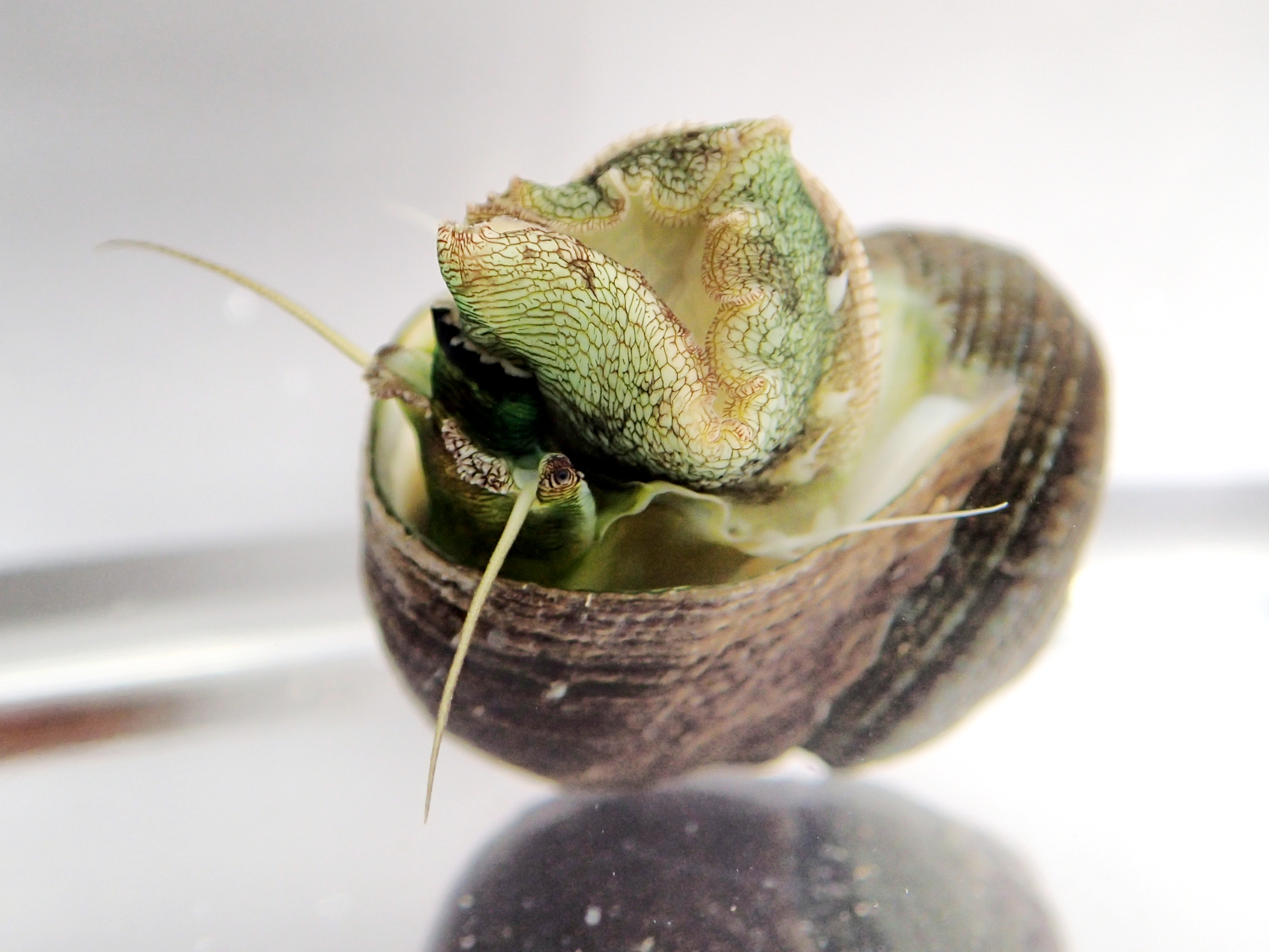

Shell: Shell thick, globose, with depressed, domed spire and large body whorl. Protoconch eroded. Teleconch consisting of about four convex whorls with rounded periphery and distinct suture. Initial part of teleconch sculptured with fine granules, regularly arranged to form seven spiral lines. Sculpture gradually disappearing and becoming smooth towards body whorl excepting irregular growth lines, but remaining faintly at base. Sutural ramp moderately rugose. Umbilicus circular, narrow and deep. Nacreous part of parietal wall widely extended beyond umbilicus by secondary resorption. Aperture nearly circular. Outer lip simple, sharp and thin. Lower part of columellar lip extended basally, especially in young specimens. Coloration dark greenish brown, aperture pearly white, umbilical area orange.

Operculum: Operculum calcareous, nearly circular, dome-shaped, minutely granulose, paucispiral; white in colour with green margin except at adaxial side. Inner side of operculum simple, dark brown with spiral line. External anatomy: Head with snout, cephalic lappets, cephalic tentacles and eystalks. Outer lip of mouth forming thick oral disk. Eyes open, plugged with vitreous body at tips of eyestalks. Inhalant and exhalant neck lobes present in neck region. Head part and eyestalks brown; black pigmentation present transversely at tip of snout. Foot with three pairs of epipodial tentacles. Operculum attached to opercular lobe of epipodium.

Radula: Radula rhipidoglossate, with formula n-5-1-5-n. Radular teeth rows bilaterally symmetrical. Central tooth subrectangular, plate-like, with straight cutting edge. Inner four lateral teeth slender, with reduced cusps. Outermost laterals spatulate, almost straight, with reduced cusps. Marginal teeth same both in size and shape, with reduced cusps. Shaft of marginal teeth long, almost straight and flat. Variations: Intraspecific variation extremely low. Shell uniformly thick, globose with dark brown colour.

== Distribution and habitat ==
Lunella ogasawarana is native to Chichijima and Anijima, Ogasawara Islands, Japan (27˚5´N, 142˚12´E), where it is found in the upper intertidal, on sandy beaches covered with boulders.
