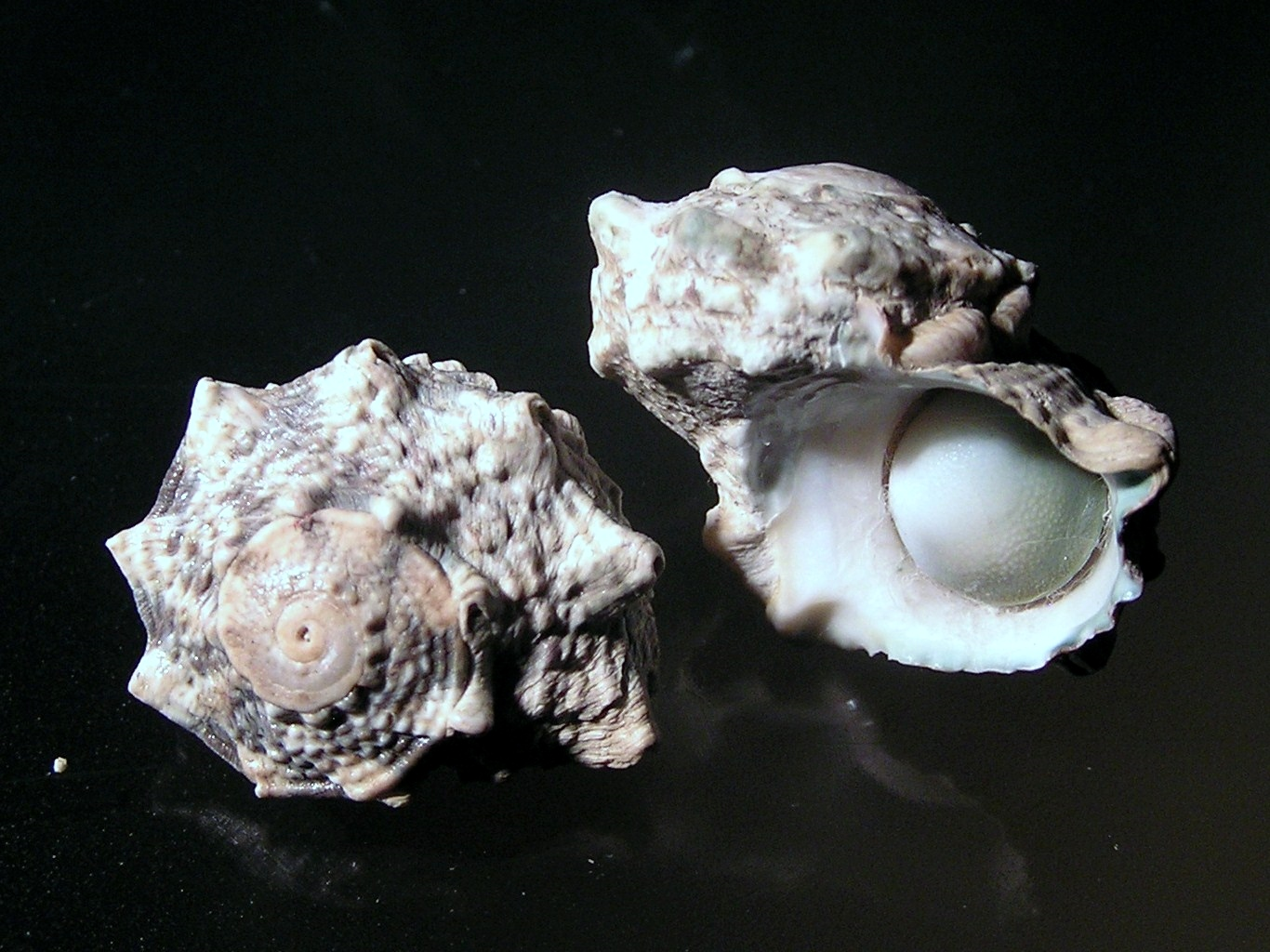
- Two shells of Lunella granulata

Scientific classification
- Kingdom: Animalia
- Phylum: Mollusca
- Class: Gastropoda
- Subclass: Vetigastropoda
- Order: Trochida
- Superfamily: Trochoidea
- Family: Turbinidae
- Genus: Lunella; Röding, 1798

Type species
- Turbo versicolor Gmelin, 1791

Synonyms
- Lunella (Lunella) Röding, 1798; Lunella (Ninella) Gray, 1850; Lunella (Subninella) Thiele, 1929; Ninella Gray, 1850; Subninella Thiele, 1929; Turbo (Lunella) Röding, 1798 (rank change)

= Lunella =

Genus of gastropods

Lunella is a genus of sea snails, marine gastropod mollusks in the family Turbinidae, the turban snails.

The Australian Faunal Directory classifies Lunella as Turbo (Lunella) Röding, 1798

== Species ==
Species within the genus Lunella include:

- Lunella cinerea (Born, 1778)
- Lunella coronata (Gmelin, 1791)
- Lunella correensis (Récluz, 1853)
- Lunella granulata (Gmelin, 1791)
- Lunella jungi (Lai, 2006)
- Lunella moniliformis Röding, 1798
- Lunella ogasawarana Tomoyulo Nakano, Kyoko Takashashi & Tomowo Ozawa, 2007
- Lunella smaragda (Gmelin, 1791)
- Lunella torquata (Gmelin, 1791)
- Lunella undulata (Lightfoot, 1786)
- Lunella viridicallus (Jousseaume, 1898)
