= Lunella jungi =

Scientific classification
- Kingdom: Animalia
- Phylum: Mollusca
- Class: Gastropoda
- Subclass: Vetigastropoda
- Order: Trochida
- Family: Turbinidae
- Genus: Lunella
- Species: L. jungi

Binomial name
- Lunella jungi (Lai, 2006)

Synonyms
- Lunella (Lunella) jungi (Lai, 2006); Turbo jungi Lai, 2006

Species of gastropod

Lunella jungi is a species of sea snail, a marine gastropod mollusk in the family Turbinidae, the turban snails.

== Distribution ==
This marine species occurs off Taiwan.
