= South Black Rock =

Island in Tasmania, Australia

Coordinates: 40°34′S 144°36′E

South Black Rock is a small island with an area of <1 ha, in Bass Strait, south-eastern Australia. It is part of Tasmania’s Hunter Island Group which lies between north-west Tasmania and King Island.

== Fauna ==
Breeding seabird and shorebird species include fairy prion, common diving-petrel, Pacific gull and black-faced cormorant.
