= Three Hummock Island =

Island in Tasmania, Australia

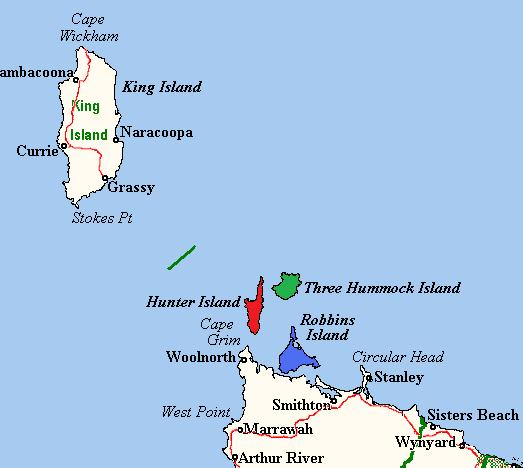
- Map of the Hunter Island Group, Three Hummock Island is shown in green

- Location within Tasmania
- Etymology: Three prominent hills: North, Middle and South Hummock

Geography
- Location: Bass Strait
- Coordinates: 40°26′24″S 144°54′36″E
- Archipelago: Hunter Group
- Area: 70 km^{2} (27 sq mi)
- Highest elevation: 237 m (778 ft)
- Highest point: South Hummock

Administration
- Australia
- State: Tasmania
- Largest settlement: Chimney Corner

Additional information
- Official website: threehummockisland.com.au

The Three Hummock Island, part of the Hunter Island Group, is a 70-square-kilometre (27 sq mi) granite island, located in the Bass Strait near King Island, lying off the north-west coast of Tasmania, Australia.

The island is named after its three most prominent hills, North, Middle and South Hummock, the latter being the highest, with an elevation of 237 metres (778 ft) above mean sea level. From the mid-19th century until the mid-1970s, most of the island was subject to a pastoral lease, allowing farming and grazing to take place.

The focus of human settlement on the island is the homestead at Chimney Corner at the westernmost point. There is an automated lighthouse at Cape Rochon in the north-east, as well as roads, three airstrips, fencing and a wharf. Seasonal muttonbirding occurs in March and April.

== Flora and fauna ==
Much of the island is composed of dense scrub, dominated by Leptospermum scoparium, Melaleuca ericifolia and Banksia marginata, while 25% of the area is covered by Eucalyptus nitida woodland.

The island forms part of the Hunter Island Group Important Bird Area. Breeding seabirds and shorebirds include little penguins, short-tailed shearwaters, Pacific gulls, pied oystercatchers, sooty oystercatchers and hooded plover. Mammals include the introduced eastern grey kangaroo, feral cats and house mice. Feral sheep were recorded in a 1999 survey. Tiger snakes are also present.

== European settlement ==
=== Warne Family ===
Elias Albert Warne acquired a lease over the island in 1926. His son, Cecil Vernon Warne, arrived from Melbourne in February 1926, aboard the Hillsmeads, bringing the first 500 sheep to the Island. During the following weeks, three more shipments arrived, making a total of 2,200 sheep. Some cattle were still on the island, having been left by previous lessors. They were rounded up, and some sold with a bull purchased from Hunter Island. Fences were repaired.

Two years previously, Cecil Warne had married Dulcie Ruby Trevena in Birchip, Victoria. Dulcie had remained in Melbourne for the birth of their first son, Colin Robert, on 8 April.

Cecil returned to Melbourne for the birth and came back with some family members. He set about constructing a shearing shed and sheep pens, and even constructed a cement-lined sheep dip, which still exists under a boxthorn hedge.

The family lived in a house built in 1910 and Dulcie baked bread in the big wood oven, made butter and sold some at times. An older house, built c.1850, was recycled for timber and nails to build the shearing shed. Tracks were cleared around the island, with only transport being horses pulling a sled for new fence posts, tools and, sometimes, family for a weekend picnic.

On 2 September, shearers arrived and helped with final work on the sheep dip. They spent almost five weeks until all sheep were shorn and dipped, with 48 bales of wool sent off to market aboard the Coomonderry. During their first year (1926) they were able to send to market the following: cattle 277, sheep 704, butter 9 boxes, wool 48 bales.

Cecil and Dulcie left the island in 1929 and went back to farming in the Mallee. Elias and other members of the Warne family remained on the island looking after the stock. During 1931, Elias advertised the island for stock agistment. In 1933, an auction was held for a new 16-year lease and the Nichols Family commenced their time on the island.

=== Nichols family ===
Bill and Amelia ("Ma") Nichols leased Three Hummock Island from 1933 till 1950, grazing cattle and sheep. They were also involved in fishing and muttonbirding. Over the years they owned several ships, including Lady Jean, Lady Flinders, and Jean Nichols, which were used to carry cargo and passengers to and from the Bass Strait islands and to Melbourne and Launceston. They built up a small community of workers on the island, including some of their relations. One of these workers was Peggy Puckett, from Stanley. Her story is told in A Walk Along the Shore in which she describes life on the island with the Nichols family during the six years she lived with them, from 1937 to 1943. Mrs Nichols named "Peg's Paddock" after her, mentioned in both A Walk Along the Shore and Eleanor Alliston's Escape to An Island.

The Nichols family left the island in 1950 and the Alliston family arrived in 1951.

=== Alliston family ===
Eleanor Alliston wrote Escape to an Island and Island Affair, about the life of her family on Three Hummock Island. The two books tell the story of how the Alliston family emigrated from England after the end of World War II to start a new life alone on the island, in the hope of providing a better and different childhood for their children. The second book ends in 1984, the island having a population of two, the author and her husband. Their four children, who were brought up on the island, had left it, were married with families, having a total of ten grandchildren. In the 1990s, one of the Alliston children, Rob, returned to the island to run a tourist venture. The Alliston family sold the lease in 2006.

The book Island Affair contains mention of Giuseppe Garibaldi's visit to the island in 1852 as a captain of the trading vessel Carmen, while in exile from Italy.

== Ecotourism ==
In 1978, the majority of the 7,400 hectares was declared a Nature Reserve, and in 2001 a State Reserve. John and Beverley O'Brien lived on Three Hummock Island from 2009-2018, as managers. Three Hummock Island now operates as an eco-tourism venture, with accommodation for up 14 people.
