= Hunter Island (Tasmania) =

Island in Tasmania, Australia

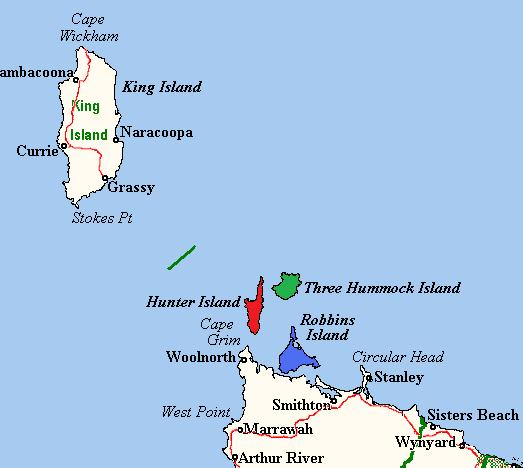
- Map of the Hunter Island Group

- Location of the Hunter Island in Bass Strait

Geography
- Location: Bass Strait
- Coordinates: 40°30′S 144°47′E
- Archipelago: Hunter Island Group
- Area: 7,330 ha (18,100 acres)
- Length: 25 km (15.5 mi)
- Width: 6.5 km (4.04 mi)

Administration
- Australia
- State: Tasmania

The Hunter Island, the main island of the Hunter Island Group, is a 7,330-hectare (18,100-acre) island, located in Bass Strait, that lies between King Island and north-west Tasmania, Australia.

The island is located near Three Hummock Island, several kilometres off the north-west coast of Tasmania. The island is run as a cattle property and there is a homestead on the island. A privately owned barge is used for transport to Smithton on the north coast of Tasmania. The island is approximately 25 kilometres (16 mi) long, and 6.5 kilometres (4.0 mi) wide at its widest point.

The East India Ship Phatisalam was wrecked on the island in 1821.

== Hunter Island Group ==
The Hunter Island Group includes:

- Hunter Island
- Albatross Island
- Bears Island
- Bird Island
- Black Pyramid Rock
- Dugay Islet
- Edwards Islet
- Nares Rocks
- Penguin Islet
- South Black Rock
- Steep Island
- Stack Island
- Three Hummock Island

== Birds ==
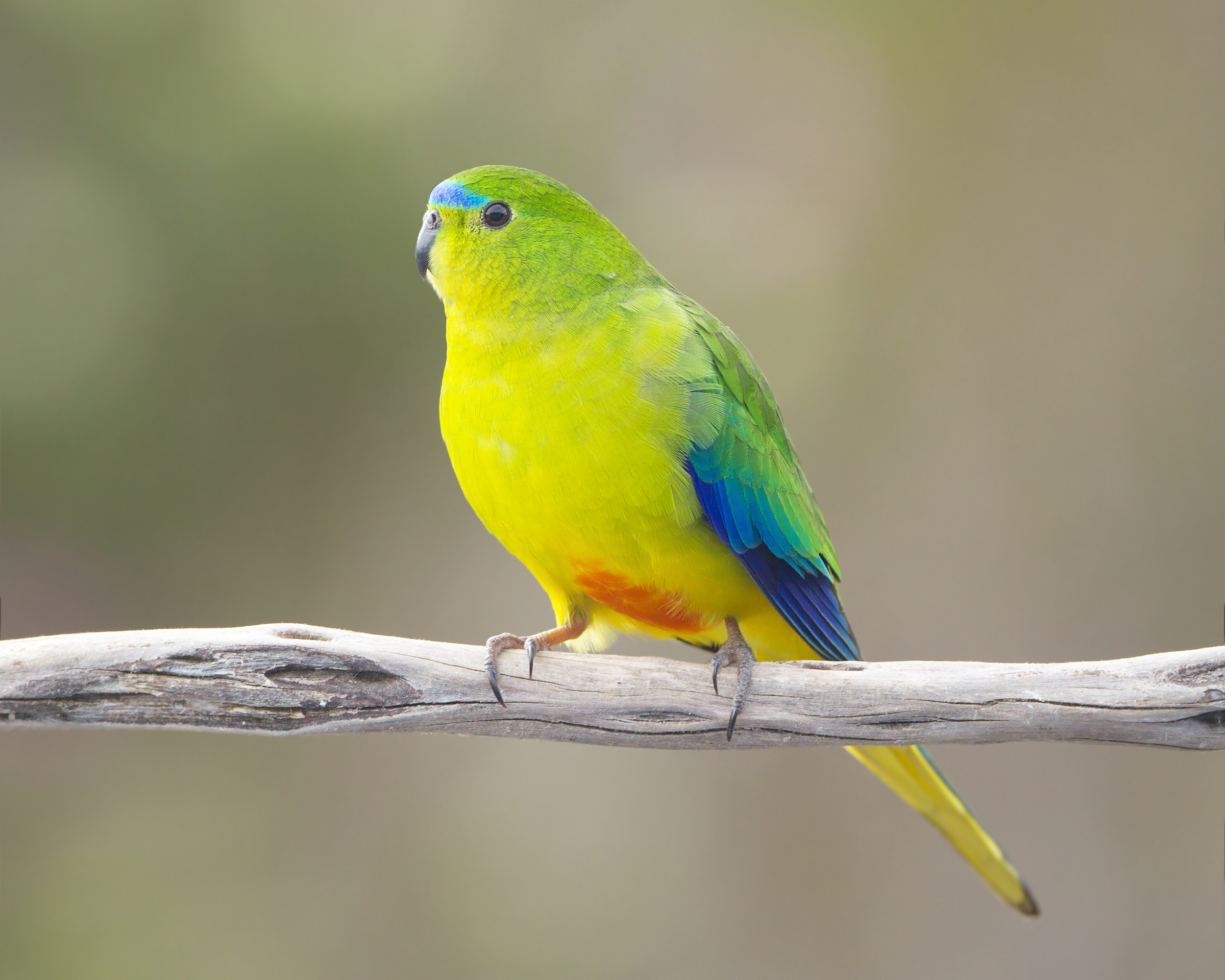
The island lies on the migration route of the orange-bellied parrot.

The island forms part of the Hunter Island Group Important Bird Area because it lies on the migration route of the critically endangered orange-bellied parrot between south-west Tasmania and mainland south-eastern Australia.

== See also ==
- List of islands of Tasmania
