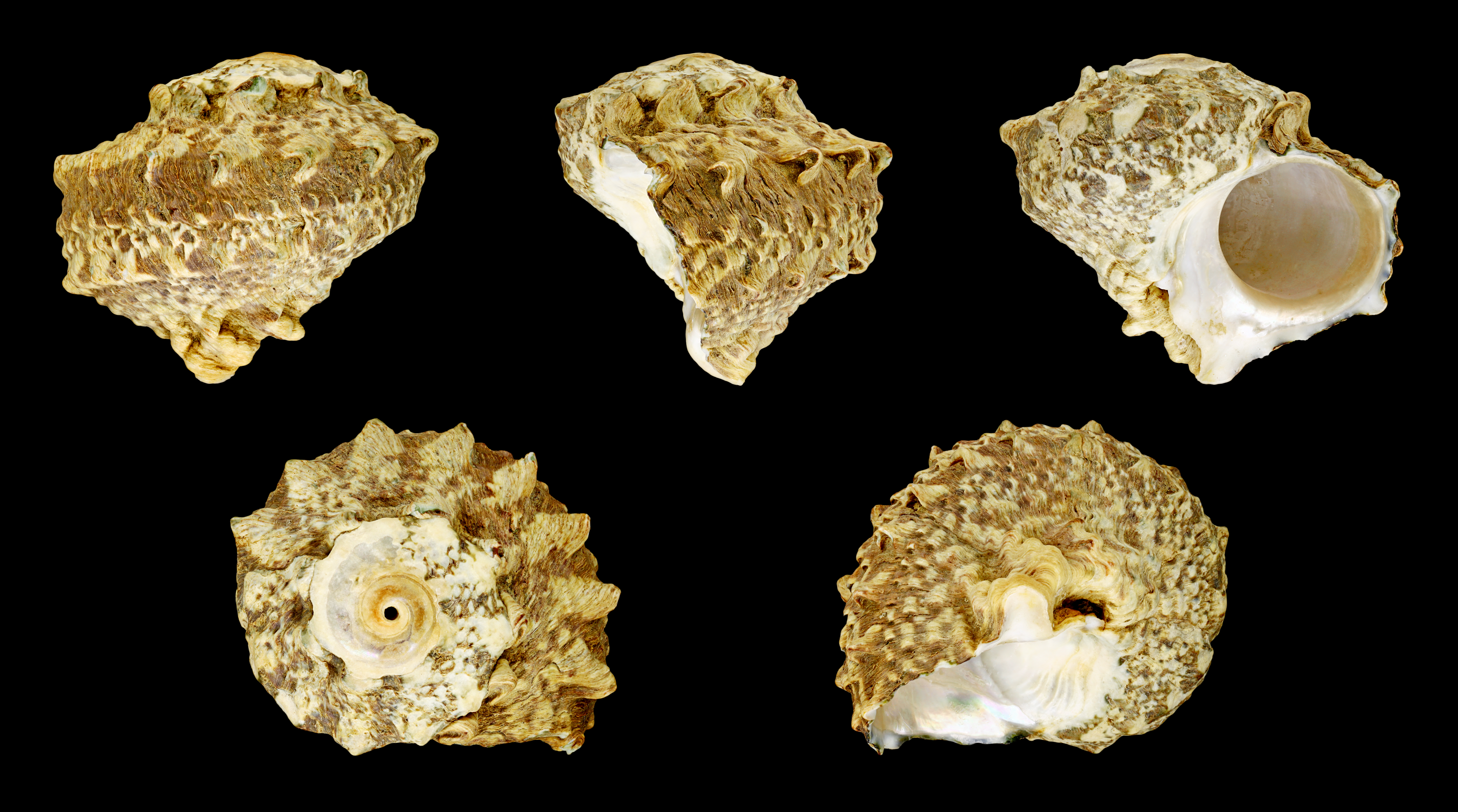
- Five views of a shell of Lunella coronata

Scientific classification
- Kingdom: Animalia
- Phylum: Mollusca
- Class: Gastropoda
- Subclass: Vetigastropoda
- Order: Trochida
- Family: Turbinidae
- Genus: Lunella
- Species: L. coronata

Binomial name
- Lunella coronata (Gmelin, 1791)

Synonyms
- Lunella coronata coronata (Gmelin, 1791); Turbo (Lunella) coronata (Gmelin, 1791); Turbo coronatus Gmelin, 1791; Turbo creniferus Gmelin, 1791; Turbo hemprichii Troschel, 1849; Turbo modestus Philippi, 1847; Turbo trochoides Reeve, 1848; Turbo viridana Röding, 1798

= Lunella coronata =

Species of gastropod

Lunella coronata, common name the crowned turban shell or the coronate moon turban, is a species of sea snail, a marine gastropod mollusk in the family Turbinidae, the turban snails.

== Description ==
The shell grows to a length of 4 cm, with conspicuous flattened, cup-like scales interspersed by small, regular rows of nodules. The colour of the shell is pale to greenish, flecked with purplish-brown markings (often encrusted with light pink coralline algae). The operculum is smooth to faintly granular with pale green centre. (Richmond, 1997).

The solid, imperforate shell has a depressed-turbinate shape with a diameter greater than the altitude. It is covered with an irregular spiral series of nodules and granules, of which the subsutural series and two on the median portion of the body whorl are more prominent. The spire is depressed, dome-shaped with an apex that is frequently eroded and red. The shell contains 4 to 5 whorls, the last very large. The large aperture is round and iridescent within. The wide columella is flattened and excavated, deflexed recurved and somewhat channelled at its base, The inside of the operculum is flat, greenish and golden, iridescent, with about 5–6 whorls and a subcentral nucleus. Its outside is convex, greenish, sparsely granulate all over.

The species is subject to a wide variation. The passage from the strongly tuberculate forms into those in which the transverse striae simply cut the lirae into diamonds or granules is made by imperceptible degrees.

== Habitat ==
This species can be found in the upper eulittoral zone, in pools or under stones.

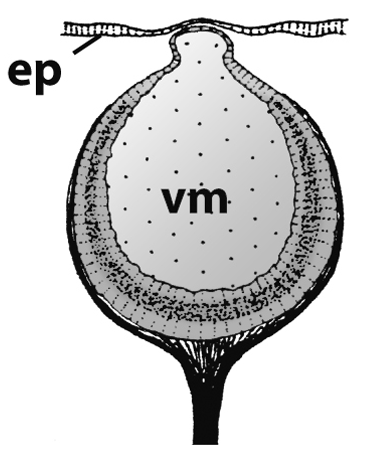
Closed eye of Lunella coronata; ep = epidermis; vm = vitreous mass

== Distribution ==
This marine species occurs in the Red Sea, off Southeast Africa, the Mascarene Basin and in the Indo-Pacific.
