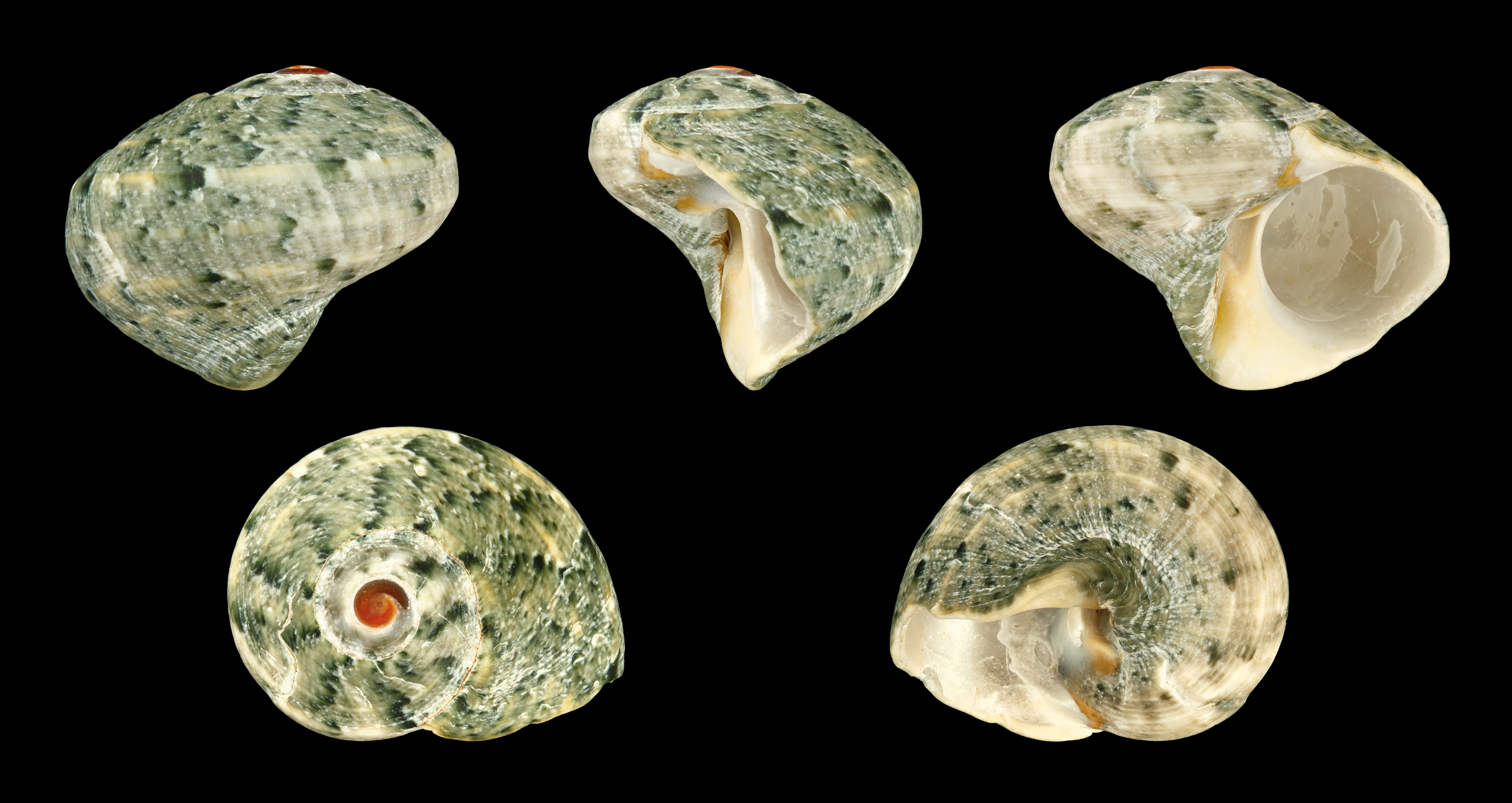

Scientific classification
- Kingdom: Animalia
- Phylum: Mollusca
- Class: Gastropoda
- Subclass: Vetigastropoda
- Order: Trochida
- Family: Turbinidae
- Genus: Lunella
- Species: L. cinerea

Binomial name
- Lunella cinerea (Born, 1778)

Synonyms
- Lunella (Lunella) cinereus Born, I. von, 1778; Turbo cinereus Born, 1778; Turbo lugubris Reeve, 1848; Turbo mespilus Gmelin, 1791; Turbo picta Röding, 1798; Turbo porcatus Reeve, 1848; Turbo porphyrites Gmelin, 1791; Turbo versicolor Gmelin, 1791; Turbo (Lunella) cinereus Born, 1778

= Lunella cinerea =

Species of gastropod

Lunella cinerea, common name the smooth moon turban, is a species of sea snail, a marine gastropod mollusk in the family Turbinidae, the turban snails.

== Description ==
The size of the shell varies between 20 mm and 50 mm. The solid, umbilicate shell has a depressed-globose shape with a strong spiral sculpture. The spire is obtuse. The suture is slightly undulating. The five whorls are spirally lirate, and with lirulae in the interstices.

== Distribution ==
This species occurs in the tropical Indo-West Pacific, off the Andaman Islands and Nicobar Islands, the Philippines, in the Red Sea, and off Australia (Northern Territory, Queensland, Western Australia).
