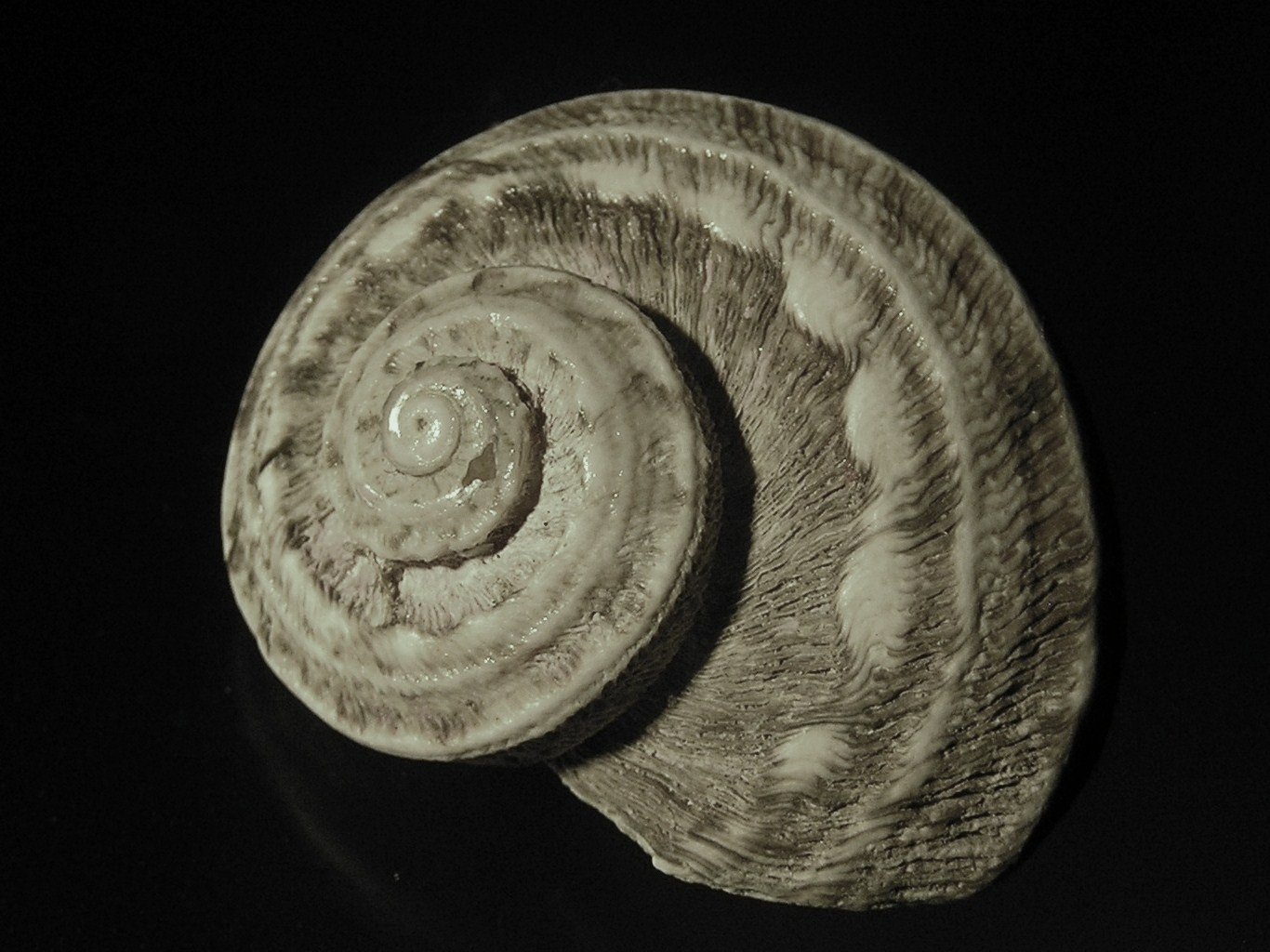
- Dorsal view of a shell of Lunella torquata
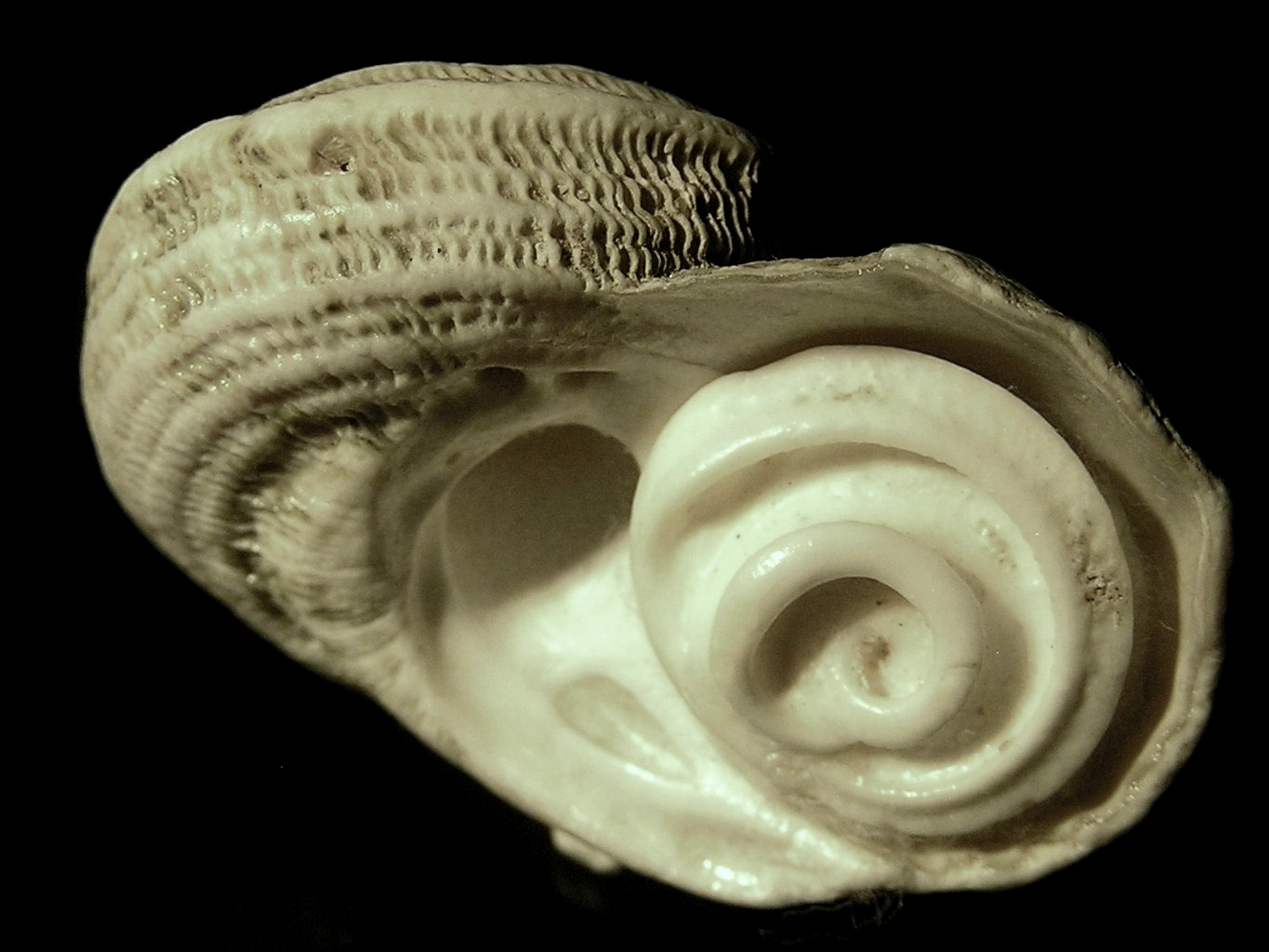
- Apertural view with operculum in place

Scientific classification
- Kingdom: Animalia
- Phylum: Mollusca
- Class: Gastropoda
- Subclass: Vetigastropoda
- Order: Trochida
- Family: Turbinidae
- Genus: Lunella
- Species: L. torquata

Binomial name
- Lunella torquata (Gmelin, 1791)

Synonyms
- Lunella (Ninella) torquata (Gmelin, 1791); Turbo lamellosus Broderip, 1831; Turbo stamineus Martyn, T., 1784; Turbo perforatus Perry, G., 1811; Turbo torquatus Gmelin, 1791 (original combination); Turbo torquatus f. whitleyi Iredale, 1949

= Lunella torquata =

Species of gastropod

Lunella torquata, common name the twisted necklace, is a species of sea snail, a marine gastropod mollusk in the family Turbinidae, the turban snails.

== Description ==
The length of the shell varies between 35 mm and 110 mm. The large, solid, umbilicate shell has an orbiculate, conic shape. It is whitish, mottled and strigate with dark brown. This species varies much in degree of elevation and carination. The six whorls show dense lamellose incremental striae and coarse spiral lirae. The upper ones are carinated, the carina becoming obsolete on the body whorl. The sutures are canaliculate, bordered below by a row of nodules. The round aperture is oblique and white within. The white columella is perforated by the wide and deep umbilicus, and with a spiral groove extending to the base.

The oval operculum is flat within, with four whorls. Its nucleus is situated one-third the distance across the face. Its outside is white, excavated at the center, with two strong spiral ribs, the inner one decidedly the stronger. It shows a sharply granular tract outside the outer rib.

== Distribution ==
This marine species occurs from New South Wales to Western Australia and off New Zealand.

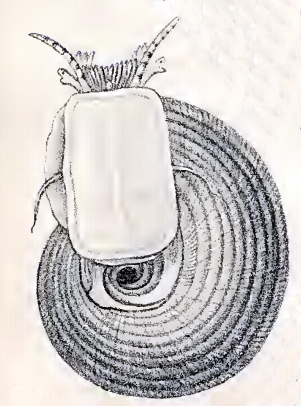
Drawing of the shell and the animal of Lunella torquata
