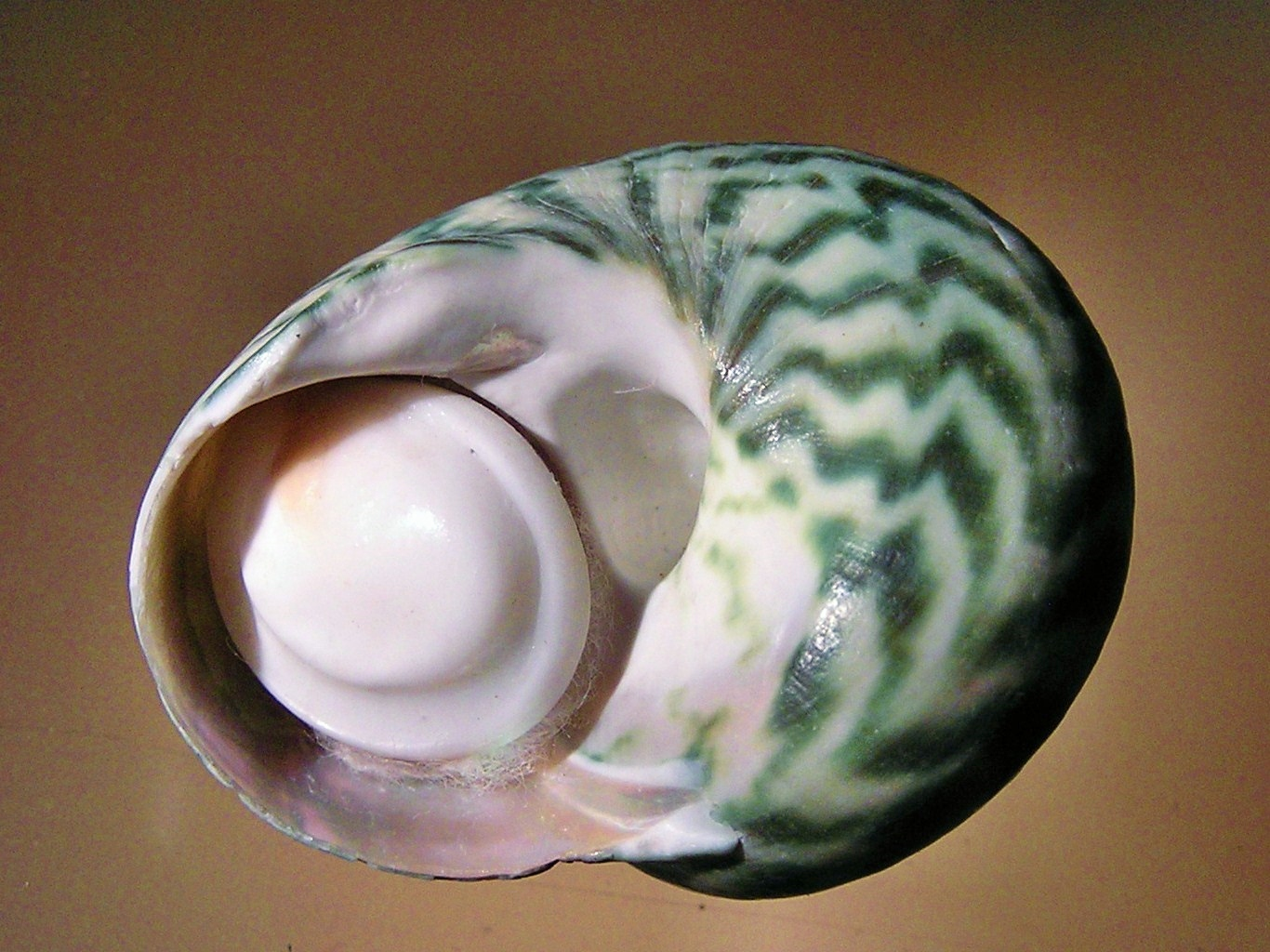
- Lunella undulata

Scientific classification
- Kingdom: Animalia
- Phylum: Mollusca
- Class: Gastropoda
- Subclass: Vetigastropoda
- Order: Trochida
- Family: Turbinidae
- Genus: Lunella
- Species: L. undulata

Binomial name
- Lunella undulata (Lightfoot, 1786)

Synonyms
- Lunella (Subninella) undulata (Lightfoot, 1786); Turbo anguis Gmelin, 1791; Turbo ludus Gmelin, 1791; Turbo simsoni Tenison-Woods, J.E., 1876; Turbo undulatus sensu Lightfoot, 1786 (original combination); Turbo (Subninella) undulatus (sensu Lightfoot, 1786)

= Lunella undulata =

Species of gastropod

Lunella undulata, common name the common warrener, the lightning turban, or periwinkle, is a species of sea snail, marine gastropod mollusk in the family Turbinidae.

== Description ==
The size of the shell varies between 33 mm and 75 mm. The solid, umbilicate shell has a depressed-globose shape. It is bright green, longitudinally strigate with white under a brown epidermis. The color pattern is sometimes unicolored green, or with the white strigations broken into tessellations. The obtuse spire is dome-shaped, or low-conic and contains five whorls. The upper ones are sometimes angulate, spirally lirate with the lirae wider than their interstices, on the body whorl often subobsolete. The last whorl descends, and is somewhat concave below the suture. The oval aperture is white within. The columella has a very wide white flattened callus which extends over the umbilical tract. The umbilicus is wide and deep.

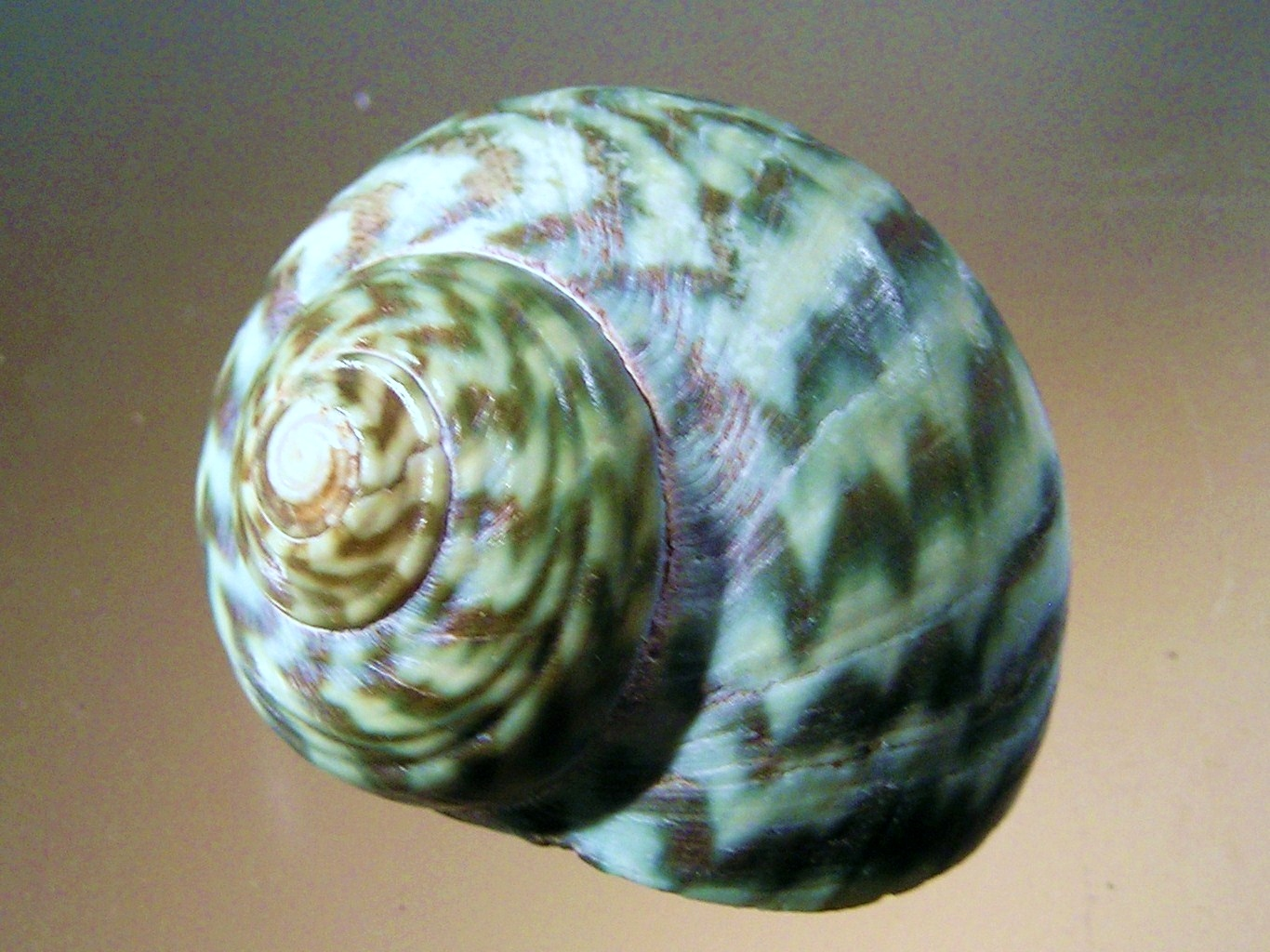
top view

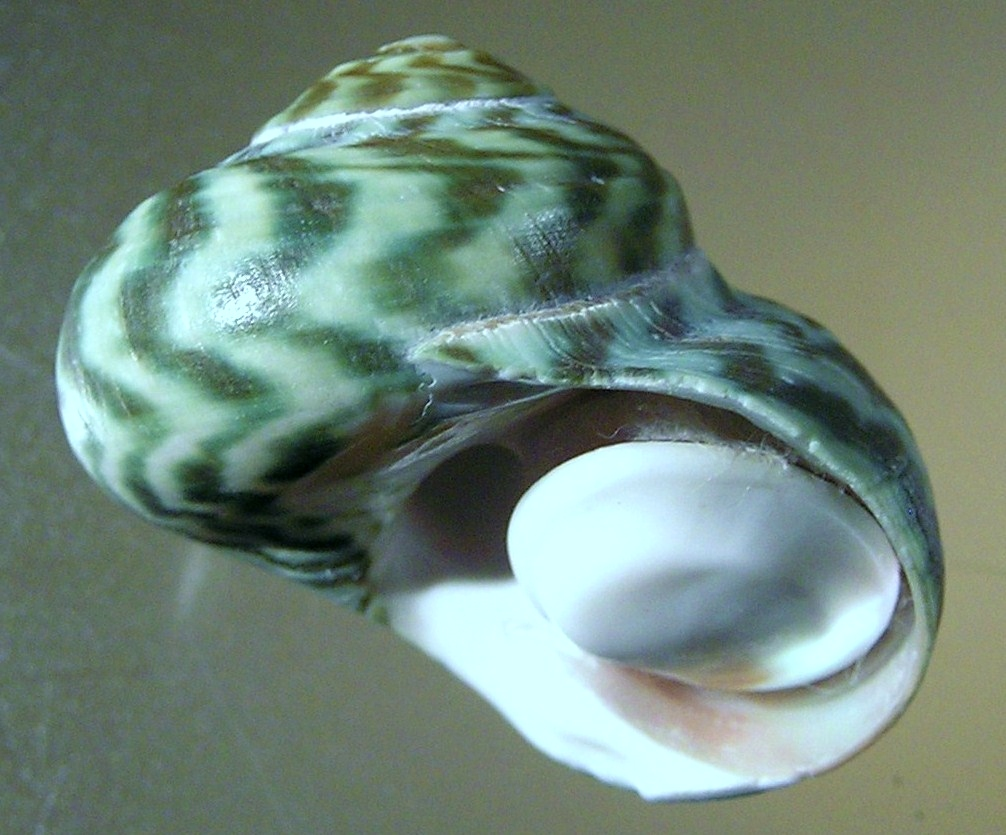
apertural view

== Distribution ==
This marine species is endemic to Australia and occurs off New South Wales, South Australia, Tasmania, Victoria and Western Australia.

== Ecology ==
The species is a dominant feature of shell middens in southeast Australia, archaeological sites created by humans consuming the animal.
