= Lunella granulata =

Scientific classification
- Kingdom: Animalia
- Phylum: Mollusca
- Class: Gastropoda
- Subclass: Vetigastropoda
- Order: Trochida
- Family: Turbinidae
- Genus: Lunella
- Species: L. granulata

Binomial name
- Lunella granulata (Gmelin, 1791)

Synonyms
- Lunella (Lunella) granulatus Gmelin, 1791; Lunella (Lunella) moniliformis (Röding, 1798); Turbo coreensis Recluz, 1853; Turbo coronatus var. granulosus Gmelin, 1788; Turbo granulatus Gmelin, 1791; Turbo granulosus Gmelin, 1791; Turbo modestus Philippi

Species of gastropod

Lunella granulata, common name the granulated moon turban, is a species of sea snail, a marine gastropod mollusk in the family Turbinidae, the turban snails.

== Description ==
The size of the shell varies between 20 mm and 40 mm. The umbilicate shell is typically more elongated than Lunella coronata with an altitude about equalling the diameter. It is finely granulose all over, with subsutural and coronal series of tubercles, and sometimes one or two additional series upon the median part of body whorl.

== Distribution ==
This marine species occurs from Taiwan to South Africa.

== Notes ==
Additional information regarding this species:

- Taxonomic status: Some authors place the name in the subgenus Turbo (Lunella)
