= Phatisalam =

1816 ship built in Cochin, India

Phatisalam was a ship of 259 tons, that was built in Cochin, India in 1816. It was wrecked in 1821, leading to the deaths of eight people.

Under the command of Captain Peter Dillon the ship left Calcutta on 25 January 1821. It was a slow journey and in early poor weather the ship began to leak badly, taking on board nearly 50 cm per hour. The crew of Lascars fared badly on the slow and arduous trip with several dying and the rest suffering from starvation and illness. In a gale on the night of 9 July 1821 the ship was beached on Hunter Island, Bass Strait. Nobody was injured in the beaching, however after waiting several months for rescue, it was decided to try to make Port Dalrymple in Tasmania. When one of the longboats was launched it capsized leading to the deaths of six crew and two prisoners. The only survivor was a female passenger.

The remaining passengers and crew reached George Town, Tasmania, after a stormy trip of some twelve days. In mid October, the wreck was surveyed and burnt by the surveyors.
