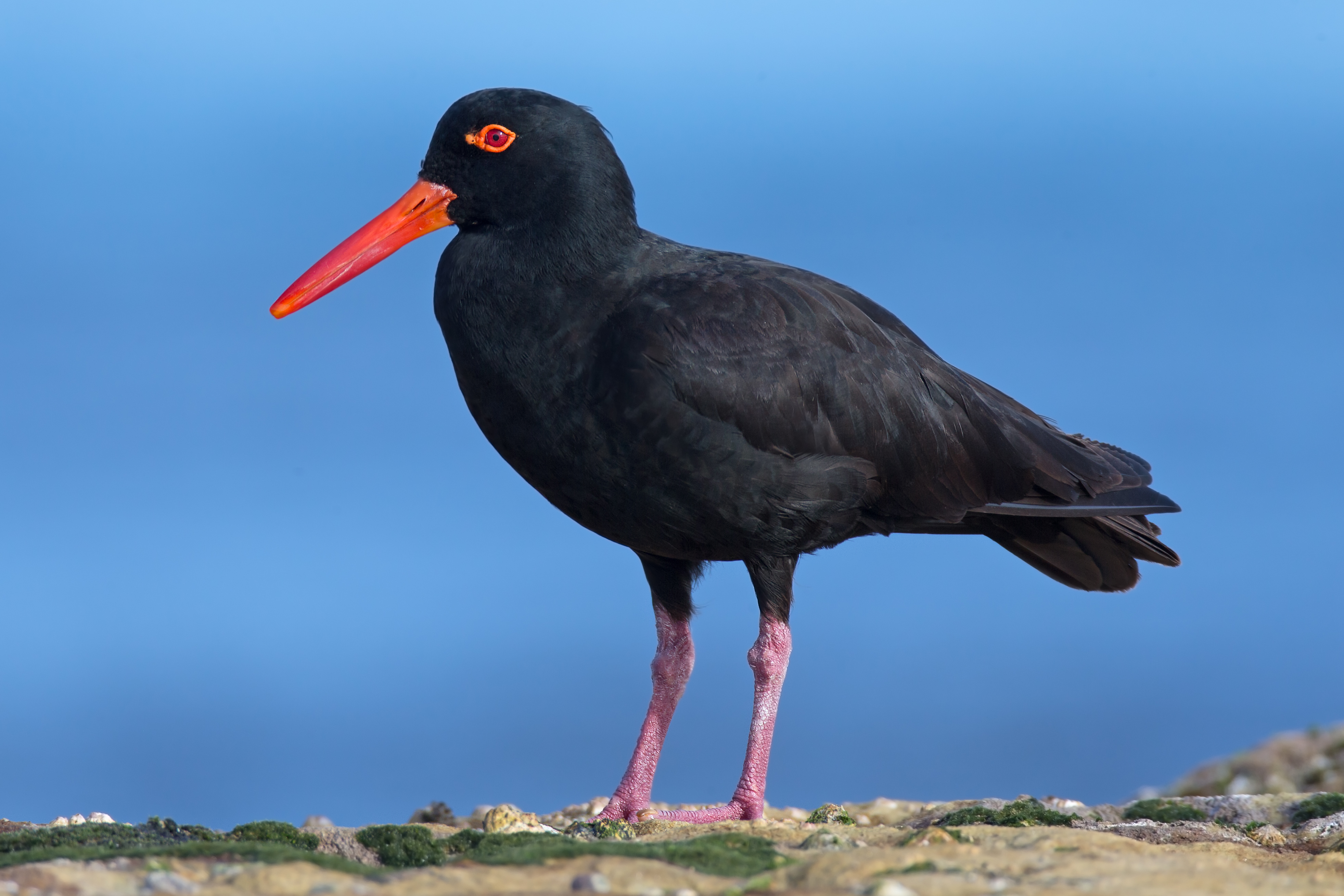

Conservation status
- Least Concern (IUCN 3.1)

Scientific classification
- Kingdom: Animalia
- Phylum: Chordata
- Class: Aves
- Order: Charadriiformes
- Family: Haematopodidae
- Genus: Haematopus
- Species: H. fuliginosus

Binomial name
- Haematopus fuliginosus Gould, 1845

= Sooty oystercatcher =

Species of bird

The sooty oystercatcher (Haematopus fuliginosus) is a species of oystercatcher. It is a wading bird endemic to Australia and commonly found on its coastline. It prefers rocky coastlines, but will occasionally live in estuaries. All of its feathers are black. It has a red eye, eye ring and bill, and pink legs.

== Taxonomy ==
John Gould described the sooty oystercatcher in 1845. Its species name is the Latin adjective fuliginosus, "sooty". Two subspecies are recognised, the nominate from the coastline of southern Australia and subspecies ophthalmicus from northern Australia. The southern subspecies is larger and heavier than the northern. The northern one, with a more yellowish eye ring, is found from the Kimberleys across the top of the country to Mackay in central Queensland. There is considerable overlap, as the southern subspecies has been found up to Cape York. Subspecies ophthalmicus has been thought distinctive enough to warrant species status and needs further investigation. Black redbill is a local name.

== Description ==
Mooloolaba, Australia

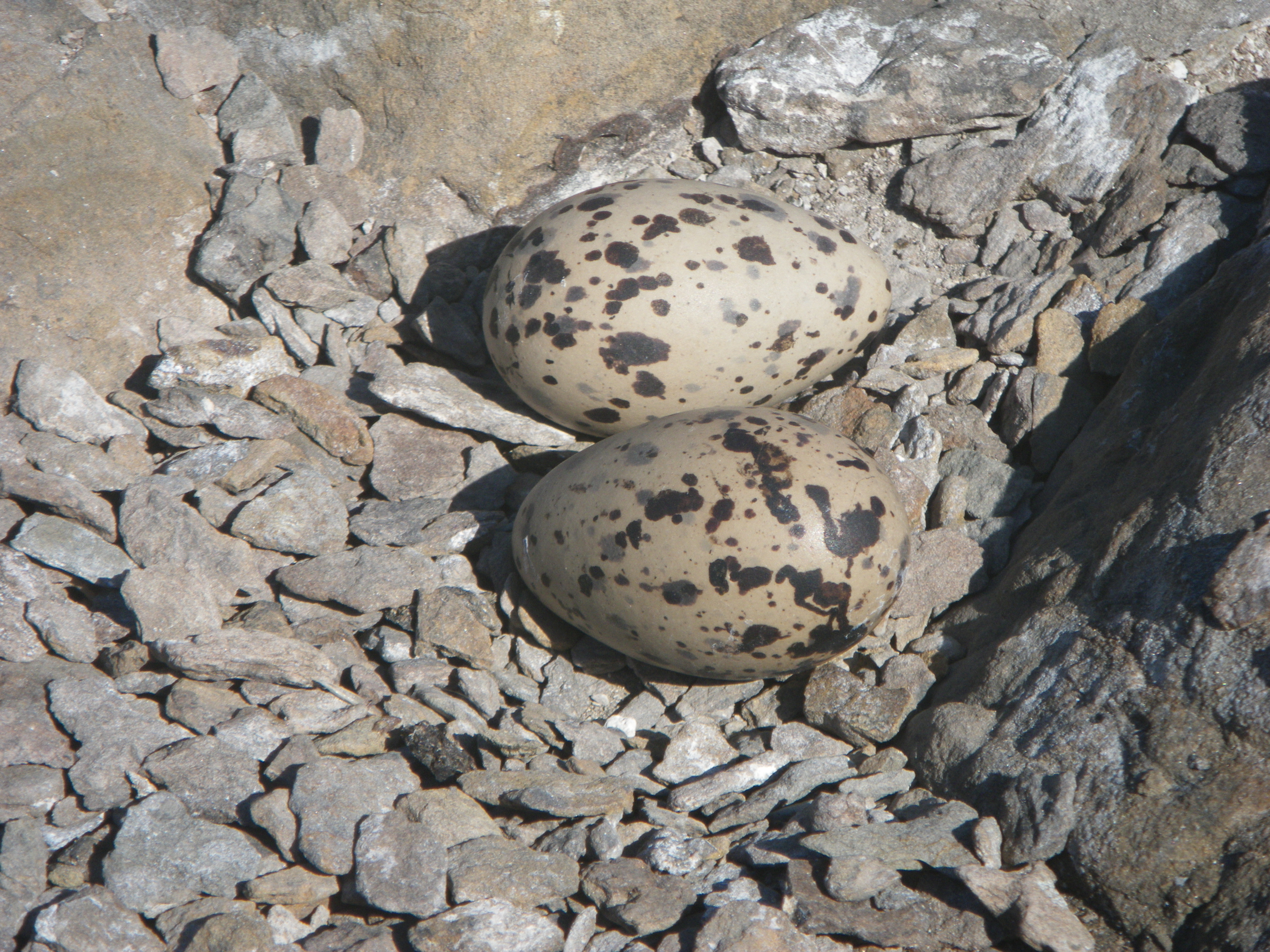
Sooty oystercatcher eggs in a nest on the south coast of New South Wales

Measuring 42 to 52 cm (16.5 to 20.5 in) long with a bill length of 5–8 cm (2–3 in), the sooty oystercatcher has all black plumage, with pink-red legs and scarlet or orange-red bill and eyes. The heaviest of all oystercatchers, the sooty oystercatcher weighs up to 980 g (2.16 lb), averaging around 819 g (1.806 lb), with females larger and heavier in both subspecies. Males have shorter, thicker bills and females have longer, thinner bills. The 19% average difference in length is the most marked of any oystercatcher species. Immature birds have grey-brown legs, a bill tipped with brown, a browner cast to their plumage, and brown eyes. The bill, eyes and legs become red by the second year.

== Distribution and habitat ==
Preferring rocky shores, the sooty oystercatcher is endemic to Australia. There are an estimated 11,500 individuals, 4000 of the nominate race and 7500 of the northern race. It is common around the Tasmanian coastline and Bass Strait islands. However it is declared Rare in South Australia and Queensland, Near Threatened in Victoria and Endangered in New South Wales.

== Feeding ==
The sooty oystercatcher almost always forages in the intertidal zone, for the two hours either side of low tide. A field study published in 2011 showed that prey items differed markedly between the sexes with only a 36% overlap. Females focussed on soft-bodied prey which they could swallow whole such as fish, crabs, bluebottle jellyfish and various worm-like creatures such as cunjevoi, while males preferred hard-shelled prey such as mussels (Mytilus planulatus), sea urchins, turban shells (Lunella undulata and Lunella torquata), and black periwinkle (Nerita atramentosa).

== Breeding ==
A clutch of two to three eggs is laid in a crevice in rocks or small hollow or flat on the ground, often on an island or high place where parent birds can keep watch. Tapered oval in shape, the eggs are buff to beige with dark brown and lavender dots and splotches and measure 63 mm (2.5 in) long by 42 mm (1.7 in) wide.
