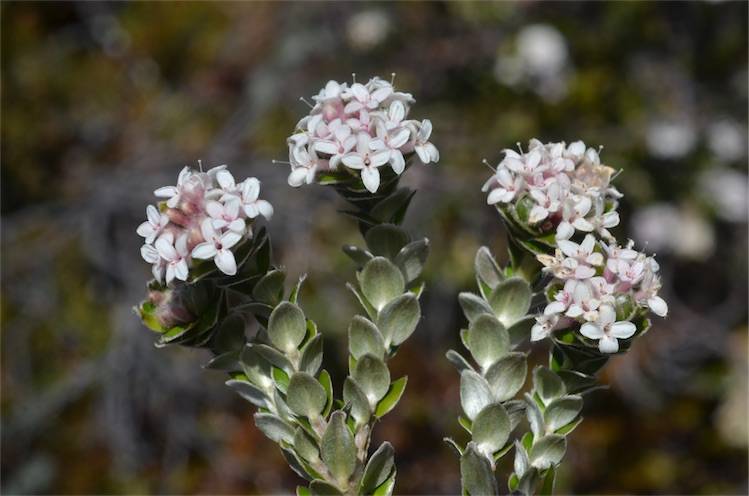
- On Mount Wellington

Scientific classification
- Kingdom: Plantae
- Clade: Tracheophytes
- Clade: Angiosperms
- Clade: Eudicots
- Clade: Rosids
- Order: Malvales
- Family: Thymelaeaceae
- Genus: Pimelea
- Species: P. sericea

Binomial name
- Pimelea sericea R.Br.

= Pimelea sericea =

Species of shrub

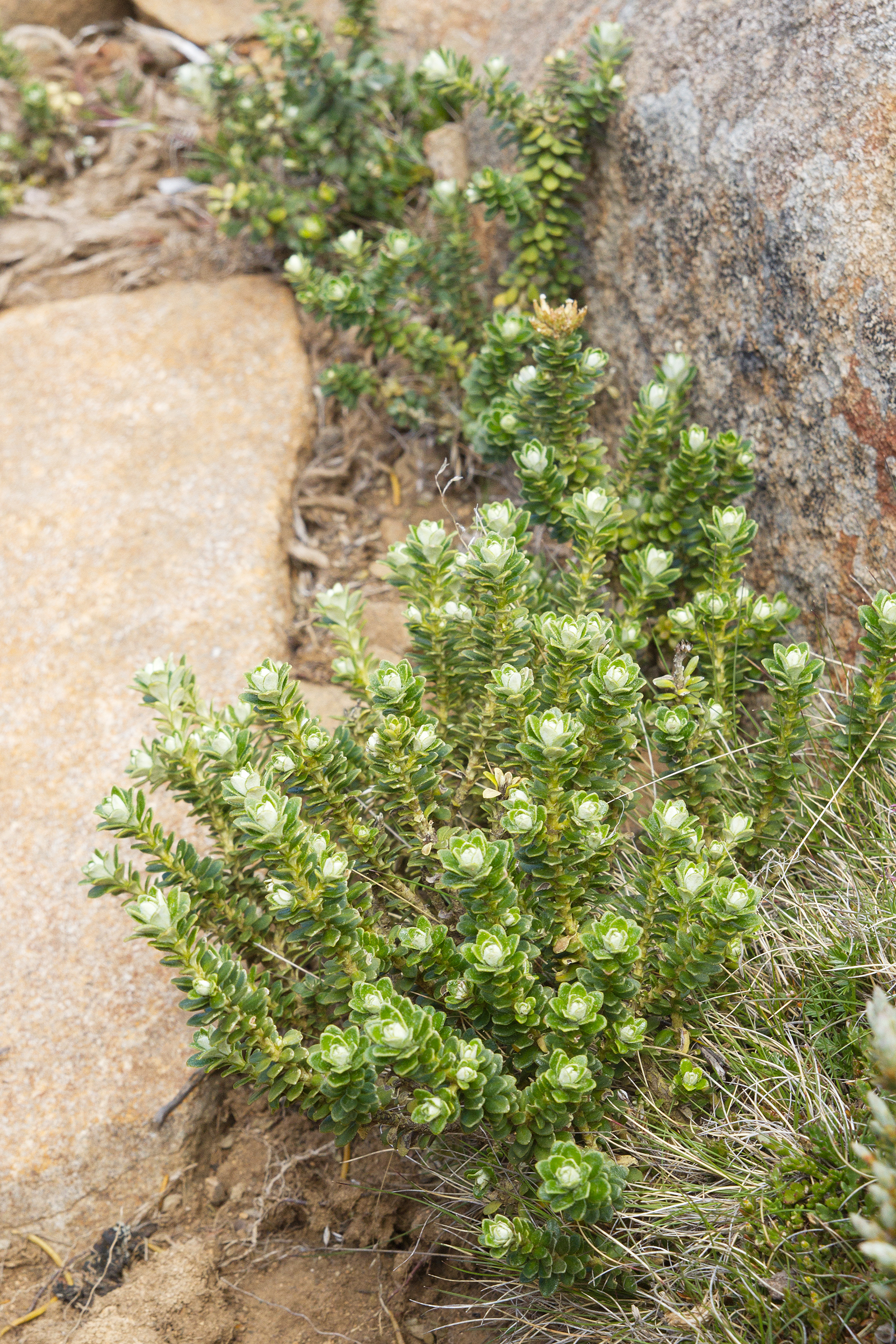
Habit in Walls of Jerusalem National Park

Pimelea sericea is a species of flowering plant in the family Thymelaeaceae and is endemic to Tasmania. It is a shrub with densely hairy young stems, elliptic leaves arranged in opposite pairs, and compact clusters of white, pink or pinkish-white flowers.

== Description ==
Pimelea sericea is a shrub that typically grows to a height of 20–80 cm (7.9–31.5 in) and has densely hairy young stems. Its leaves are arranged in opposite pairs, elliptic, 3–9 mm (0.12–0.35 in) long and 2–6 mm (0.079–0.236 in) wide on a short petiole. The upper surface of the leaves is dark green and glabrous, sometimes glaucous, and the lower surface is densely covered with white or silky, silvery hairs. The flowers are mostly bisexual and arranged on the ends of branches in compact clusters of many white, pink or pinkish-white flowers, that are densely hairy on the outside. The floral tube is 5.5–7.5 mm (0.22–0.30 in) long, the sepals 2–3 mm (0.079–0.118 in) long, the stamens shorter than the sepals and the style protrudes from the floral tube. Flowering mainly occurs from November to February.

Pimelea leiophylla is morphologically similar to P. sericea but has sparse hairs on the upper surface of the leaves, more flowers in each cluster, is restricted to altitudes below about 450 m (1,480 ft) and occurs on the Freycinet Peninsula and Schouten Island.

== Taxonomy ==
Pimelea sericea was first formally described in 1810 by Robert Brown in his Prodromus Florae Novae Hollandiae. The specific epithet (sericea) means "silky".

This pimelea is included in Section Epallage of the genus Pimelea.

== Distribution and habitat ==
This pimelea grows on alpine and subalpine moorland at altitudes of 750–1,400 m (2,460–4,590 ft) on mountains in Tasmania, including on Cradle Mountain, Mount Barrow and Mount Wellington.
