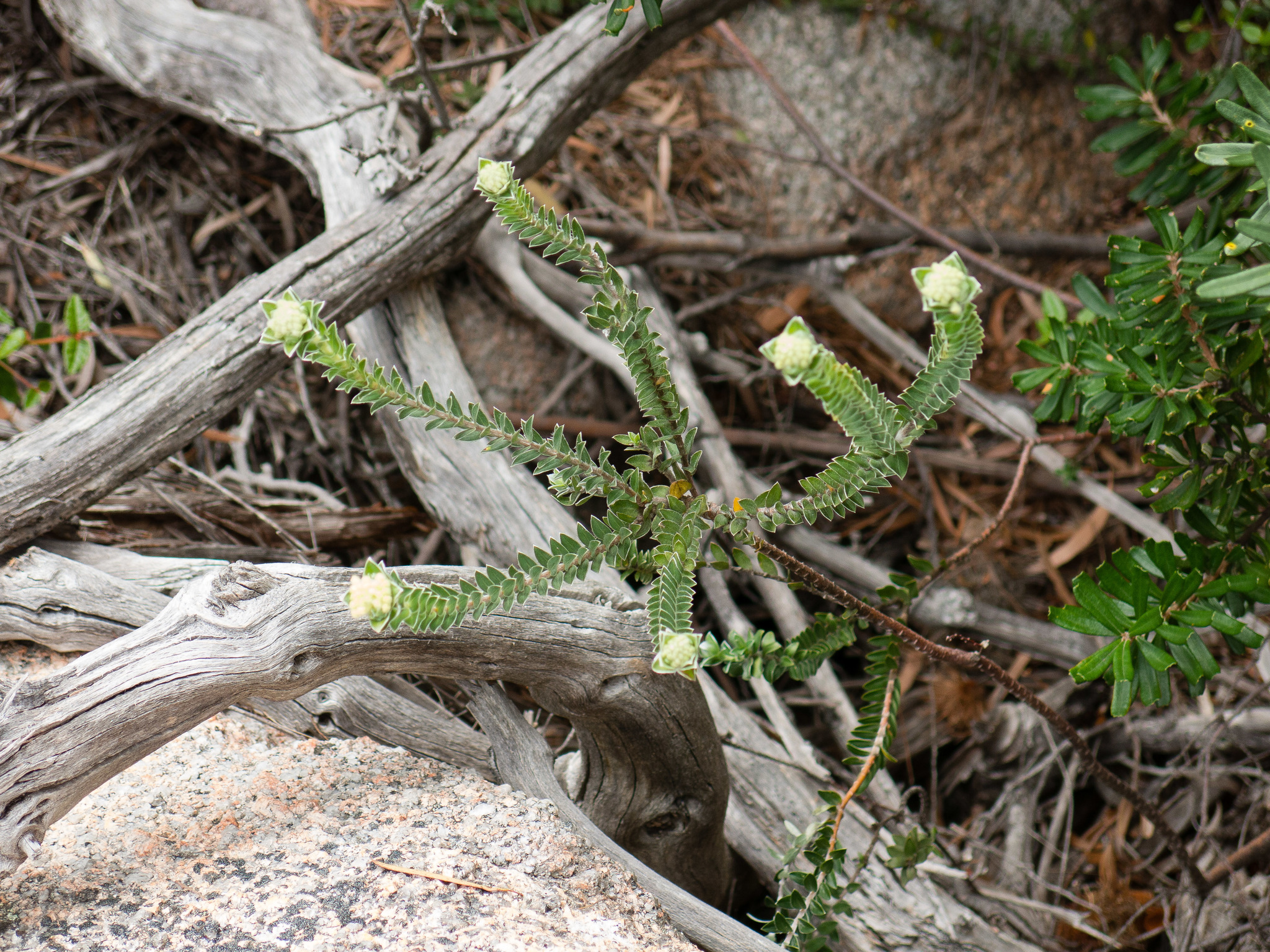
- In Freycinet National Park

Scientific classification
- Kingdom: Plantae
- Clade: Tracheophytes
- Clade: Angiosperms
- Clade: Eudicots
- Clade: Rosids
- Order: Malvales
- Family: Thymelaeaceae
- Genus: Pimelea
- Species: P. leiophylla

Binomial name
- Pimelea leiophylla A.M.Gray & M.Baker

= Pimelea leiophylla =

Species of plant

Pimelea leiophylla is a species of flowering plant in the family Thymelaeaceae and is endemic to Tasmania. It is a shrub with silky-hairy young stems, broadly elliptic to egg-shaped leaves, and clusters of 15 to 25 or more, bright white or pink, tube-shaped flowers surrounded by 4 or 8 involucral bracts.

== Description ==
Pimelea leiophylla is a shrub that typically grows to a height of 0.3–1.5 m (1 ft 0 in – 4 ft 11 in) and has silky-hairy young stems. Its leaves are decussate (arranged in alternating pairs), broadly elliptic to egg-shaped, 5–15 mm (0.20–0.59 in) long and 3–10 mm (0.12–0.39 in) wide on a petiole about 1 mm (0.039 in) long. The flowers are arranged on the ends of branches in erect clusters of 15 to 25 or more surrounded by 4 or 8 leaf-like involucral bracts. The flowers are bright white, occasionally pink and are either bisexual or female. The floral tube is 8–15 mm (0.31–0.59 in) long and the 4 sepals 3–5 mm (0.12–0.20 in) long. Flowering occurs from October to February.

== Taxonomy and naming ==
Pimelea leiophylla was first formally described in 2016 by Alan Maurice Gray and Matthew L. Baker in the journal Muelleria from specimens collected on The Hazards in 1989. The specific epithet (leiophylla) means "smooth leaves".

== Distribution and habitat ==
This pimelea grows in sparse dry woodland in a few places on the Freycinet Peninsula and on Schouten Island in eastern Tasmania.
