= Refuge Island (Tasmania) =

Island in Tasmania, Australia

Coordinates: 42°10′S 148°15′E

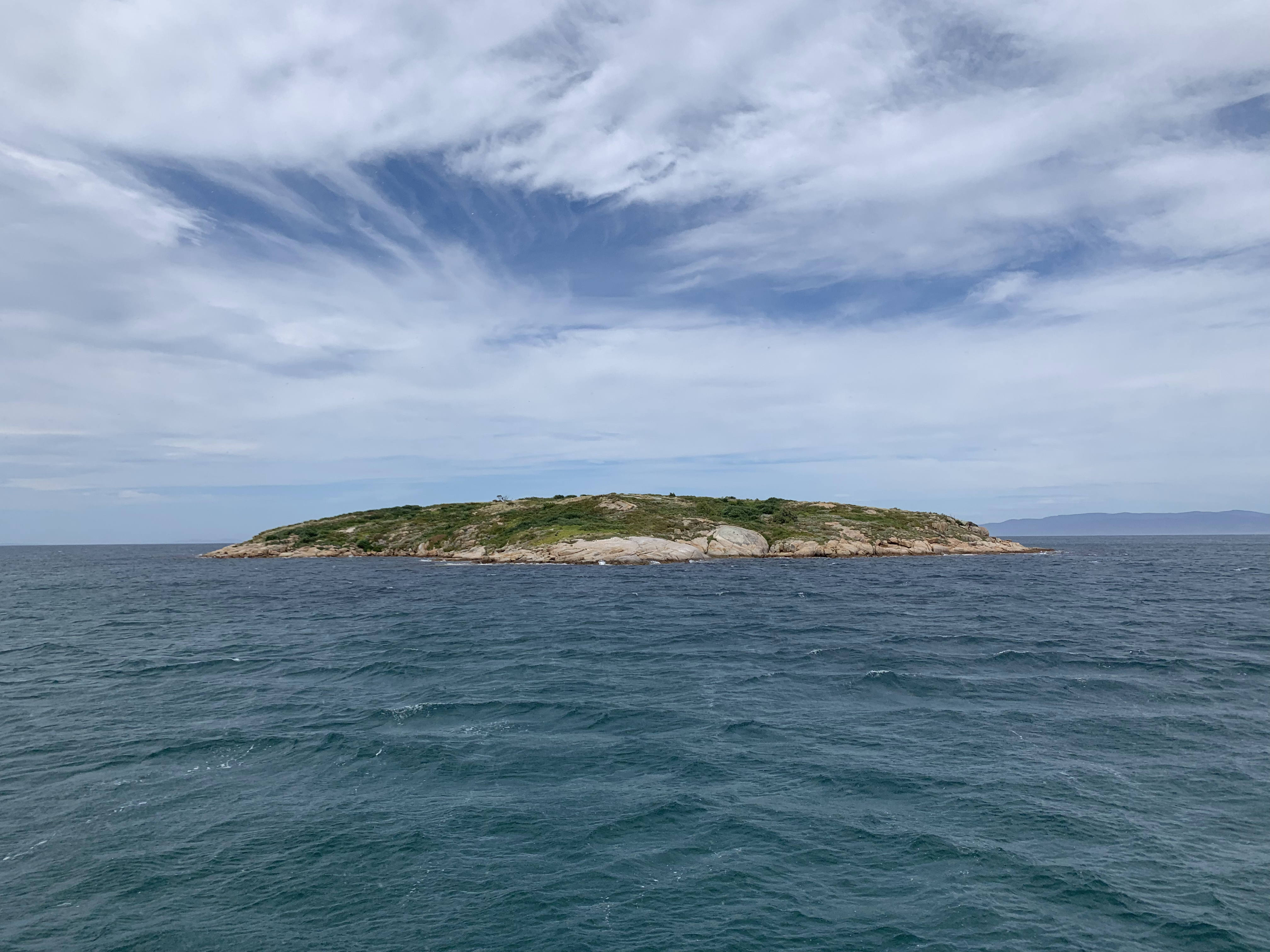
Refuge Island, Freycinet National Park, in December 2021

Refuge Island is a flat granite island, with an area of about 6 ha, in south-eastern Australia. It is part of the Schouten Island Group, lying close to the eastern coast of Tasmania near the Freycinet Peninsula and is part of the Freycinet National Park.

== History ==
Shore-based whaling activities were conducted on the island in the 1820s. George Meredity and William Maycock had rival whaling stations in 1829. The activity continued during the 1830 season.

== Fauna ==
Recorded breeding seabird species are little penguin and short-tailed shearwater. The spotted skink is present.
