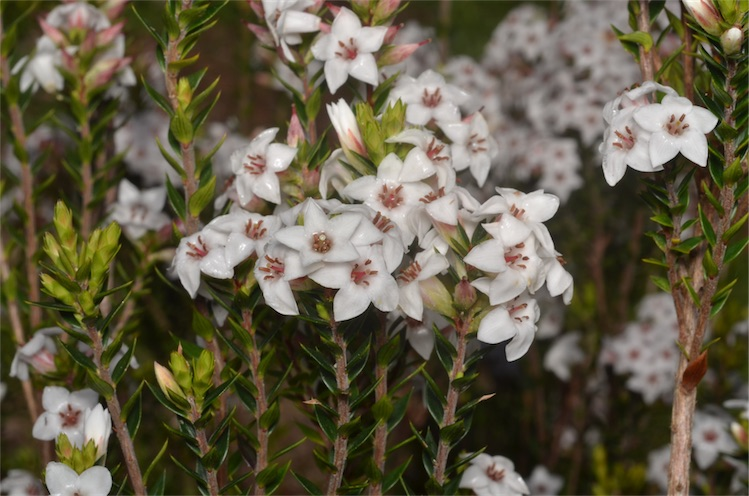

Conservation status
- Endangered (EPBC Act)

Scientific classification
- Kingdom: Plantae
- Clade: Tracheophytes
- Clade: Angiosperms
- Clade: Eudicots
- Clade: Asterids
- Order: Ericales
- Family: Ericaceae
- Genus: Epacris
- Species: E. barbata

Binomial name
- Epacris barbata Melville

= Epacris barbata =

Species of flowering plant

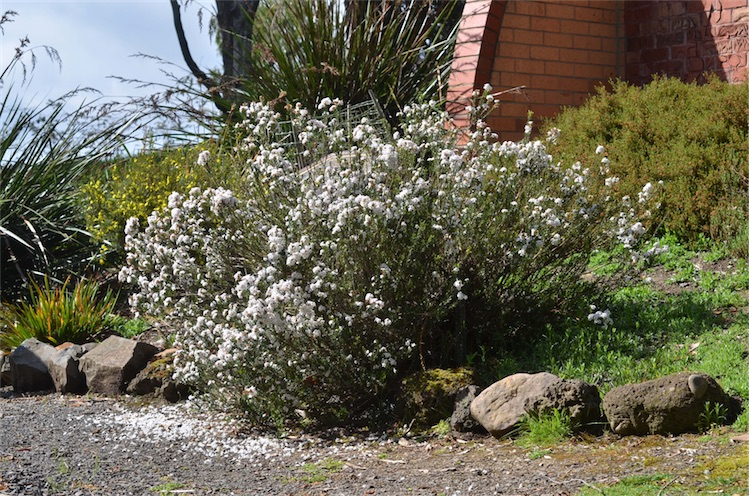
Habit in The Tasmanian Arboretum

Epacris barbata, commonly known as bearded heath, is a species of flowering plant in the heath family Ericaceae and is endemic to a restricted area of Tasmania. It is an erect shrub with lance-shaped leaves and white, tube-shaped flowers with hairy sepals.

== Description ==
Epacris barbata is an erect shrub that typically grows to a height of up to 2 m (6 ft 7 in) long and has many robust branches. The leaves are lance-shaped, 7–9.5 mm (0.28–0.37 in) long and 3–5 mm (0.12–0.20 in) wide on a petiole less than 1 mm (0.039 in) long. The leaves are sharply pointed and the edges curve downwards. The flowers are arranged singly in leaf axils near the tips of the branches, white and more or less sessile. The sepals are densely covered with soft hairs and the petals are joined at the base, forming a bell-shaped tube 4–5.5 mm (0.16–0.22 in) long with lobes 5–6.5 mm (0.20–0.26 in) long. The style is 5–6.5 mm (0.20–0.26 in) long and with the stamens, protrudes slightly beyond the petal tube. Flowering occurs in spring.

== Taxonomy and naming ==
Epacris barbata was first formally described in 1952 by Ronald Melville in the Kew Bulletin from specimens collected by Winifred Curtis at Coles Bay in 1946. The specific epithet (barbata) means "bearded".

== Distribution and habitat ==
Bearded heath is restricted to the Freycinet Peninsula and nearby Schouten Island where it grows in heath and heathy woodland on granite.

== Conservation status ==
Epacris barbata is classified as "endangered" under the Australian Government Environment Protection and Biodiversity Conservation Act 1999 and the Tasmanian Government Threatened Species Protection Act 1995. The main threat to the species is dieback due to the fungus Phytophthora cinnamomi.
