= Honeymoon Bay =

Honeymoon Bay may refer to:

- Honeymoon Bay, British Columbia
- Honeymoon Bay, Yilan
- Honeymoon Bay, Tasmania
- Honeymoon Bay, U.S. Virgin Islands, labeled Druif Bay on nautical charts.
