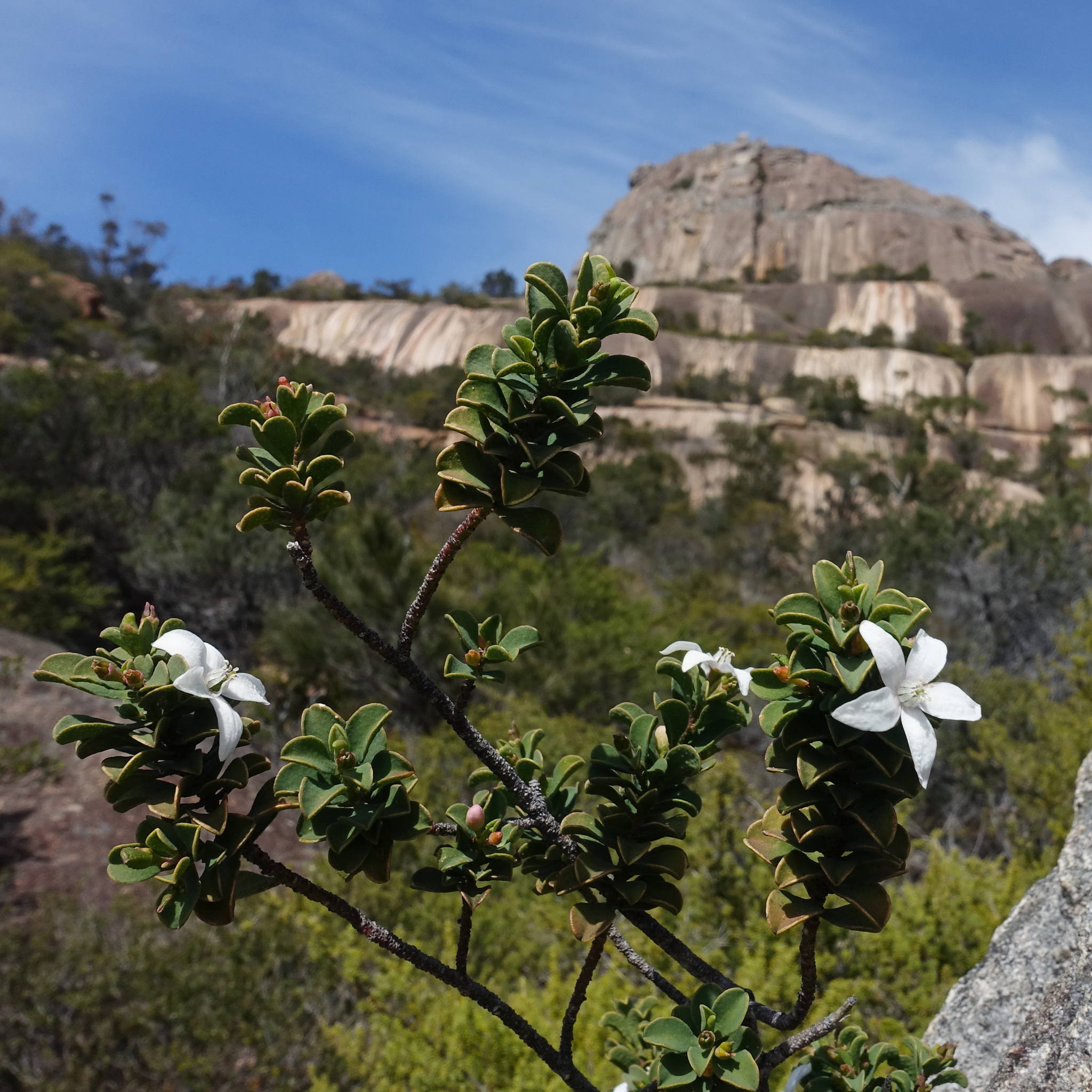

Conservation status
- Endangered (EPBC Act)

Scientific classification
- Kingdom: Plantae
- Clade: Tracheophytes
- Clade: Angiosperms
- Clade: Eudicots
- Clade: Rosids
- Order: Sapindales
- Family: Rutaceae
- Genus: Philotheca
- Species: P. freyciana

Binomial name
- Philotheca freyciana Rozefelds

= Philotheca freyciana =

Freycinet waxflower

Species of plant

Philotheca freyciana, commonly known as the Freycinet waxflower, is a species of flowering plant in the family Rutaceae and is endemic to a small area of Tasmania. It is a small, erect shrub with intertwined, heart-shaped to egg-shaped leaves with the narrower end at the base, and white, five-petalled flowers arranged singly in leaf axils.

== Description ==
Philotheca freyciana is an erect shrub that grows to a height of 40 cm (16 in). The leaves are almost intertwined, sessile, leathery, heart-shaped to egg-shaped with the narrower end towards the base, 9–13 mm (0.35–0.51 in) long and 8–13 mm (0.31–0.51 in) wide and glandular-warty on the lower surface. The flowers are borne singly in leaf axils, each flower on a pedicel 1–2 mm (0.039–0.079 in) long. There are semi-circular sepals about 1 mm (0.039 in) long and 1.5 mm (0.059 in) wide and five broadly elliptical, white petals 8–10 mm (0.31–0.39 in) long and 4–5 mm (0.16–0.20 in) wide. The ten stamens are flattened, 2.7–4 mm (0.11–0.16 in) long. Flowering occurs from April to May and from September to October. The fruit is about 4 mm (0.16 in) long.

== Taxonomy and naming ==
Philotheca freyciana was first formally described in 2001 by Andrew Rozefelds in the journal Muelleria from specimens collected on Mount Amos in Freycinet National Park.

== Distribution and habitat ==
This species of philotheca grows in cracks on granite rocks in dry, open scrubland and is only known from The Hazards in Freycinet National Park.

== Conservation status ==
This species is classified as "endangered" under the Australian Government Environment Protection and Biodiversity Conservation Act 1999 and the Tasmanian Government Threatened Species Protection Act 1995. The main threats to the species are drought stress, browsing by native animals, inappropriate fire regimes and illegal collection.
