= Xanthoparmelia freycinetiana =

Scientific classification
- Kingdom: Fungi
- Division: Ascomycota
- Class: Lecanoromycetes
- Order: Lecanorales
- Family: Parmeliaceae
- Genus: Xanthoparmelia
- Species: X. freycinetiana

Binomial name
- Xanthoparmelia freycinetiana Elix & Kantvilas (2009)
- Holotype site: Freycinet Peninsula, Tasmania

Species of lichen

Xanthoparmelia freycinetiana is a species of saxicolous (rock-dwelling), foliose lichen in the family Parmeliaceae. Found in Tasmania, Australia, it was formally described by lichenologists John Alan Elix and Gintaras Kantvilas in 2009. The species epithet refers to Freycinet Peninsula, the type locality.

== See also ==
- List of Xanthoparmelia species
