= Joost Schouten =

Joost Schouten (c. 1600 – 1644) was a Dutch East Indies Company figure of considerable repute, in demand as an astute administrator, diplomat, courtier and negotiator for this Dutch colonial and mercantile outpost in the South-East Asian archipelago today known as Indonesia. In July 1644, Schouten was found to have engaged in homosexual sex with numerous men. Convicted of sodomy, a capital offence in the seventeenth-century Netherlands, he was burnt at the stake.

== Early life: 1600–1622 ==
Born in the Netherlands, Schouten emigrated to the Dutch East Indies in 1622.

== Dutch East Indies Company career: 1624–1644 ==
Over the next two decades, Schouten established a formidable reputation in colonial trade and diplomacy. He became involved in manufacturing and trade within a Siamese Dutch East Indies Company factory enclave in Ayutthaya in 1624 and shortly thereafter became secretary to Willem Janssen on the latter's exploratory trade and reconnaissance visit to Japan in 1625.

In 1633, Schouten returned to Siam as the Dutch colonial factory director in Ayutthaya and successfully negotiated for expanded operational facilities and further Dutch trade concessions in return for diplomatic negotiation assistance rendered to Somdet Phra Chao (r. 1629–1656), the king of Siam. In 1635, Schouten maintained a record of his activities in Japan and Siam for his employers, one of the first reliable accounts of the region. It attracted enough interest to be published later in the 17th century and translated in several languages. By 1640, he had returned to Batavia and served on the Council of the Indies for elite mercantile and commercial interests within the Dutch East Indies Company. In 1642, he equipped Abel Tasman for his expedition to the Southwest Pacific, which was to circumnavigate Australia and lead to the European discovery of New Zealand. On that voyage, Tasman named Schouten Island for him.

== Prosecution and execution ==
In July 1644, Joost Schouten was accused of sodomy, a crime punishable by water or fire. He confessed to the crimes and offered no defense. After being tried and convicted, his sentence was mitigated in light of his distinguished record. The colony's governor-general, Anthony van Diemen, ordered him strangled before being burnt at the stake. At least three of his sexual partners were subsequently tied in sacks and drowned.

== See also ==
- Utrecht sodomy trials (1730–1731)

== Additional sources ==
- Francois Caron and Joost Schouten, A True Description of the Mighty Kingdoms of Japan and Siam (Siam Society: Bangkok, 1986). This publication contains two distinct accounts of the region, first published together in English in 1935.
