= Friendly Beaches Reserve =

Nature reserve in Tasmania, Australia

Coordinates: 42°01′13″S 148°16′54″E

Friendly Beaches Reserve is a 122 ha coastal nature reserve in eastern Tasmania, Australia, 190 km north-east of Hobart and 180 km south-east of Launceston. It is located on the north-east side of the Freycinet Peninsula, bordering the Freycinet National Park. It is owned and managed by Bush Heritage Australia (BHA), by which it was purchased in 1997.

== Natural values ==
The reserve contains coastal heath, woodland and a saltwater lagoon. It protects one of the few remaining natural beach systems on Tasmania's east coast. The Tasmanian devil has been recorded from the reserve.

== Access ==
While visitors are welcome to walk along the beach bordering the reserve, access to the reserve itself is prohibited due to the threat of contamination by the soil pathogen Cinnamon Fungus.
