= Honeymoon Bay (Tasmania) =

Bight in Tasmania, Australia

Coordinates: 42.137139°S 148.29853°E

Honeymoon Bay is located on the Freycinet Peninsula of Tasmania.

It is a bay within a bay, being part of the larger Coles Bay.

It is a popular destination for picnics, birdwatching and snorkeling.

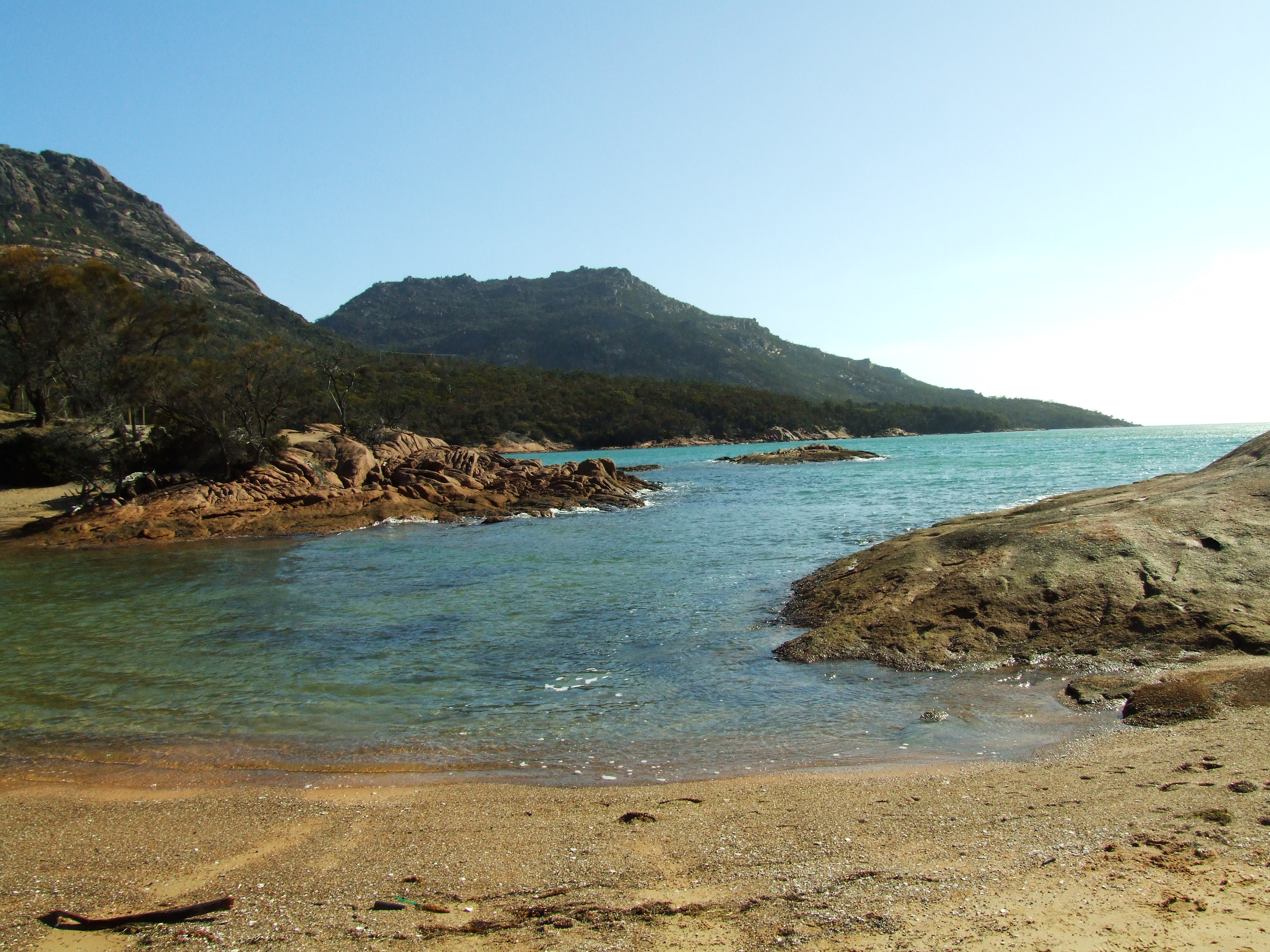
Honeymoon Bay

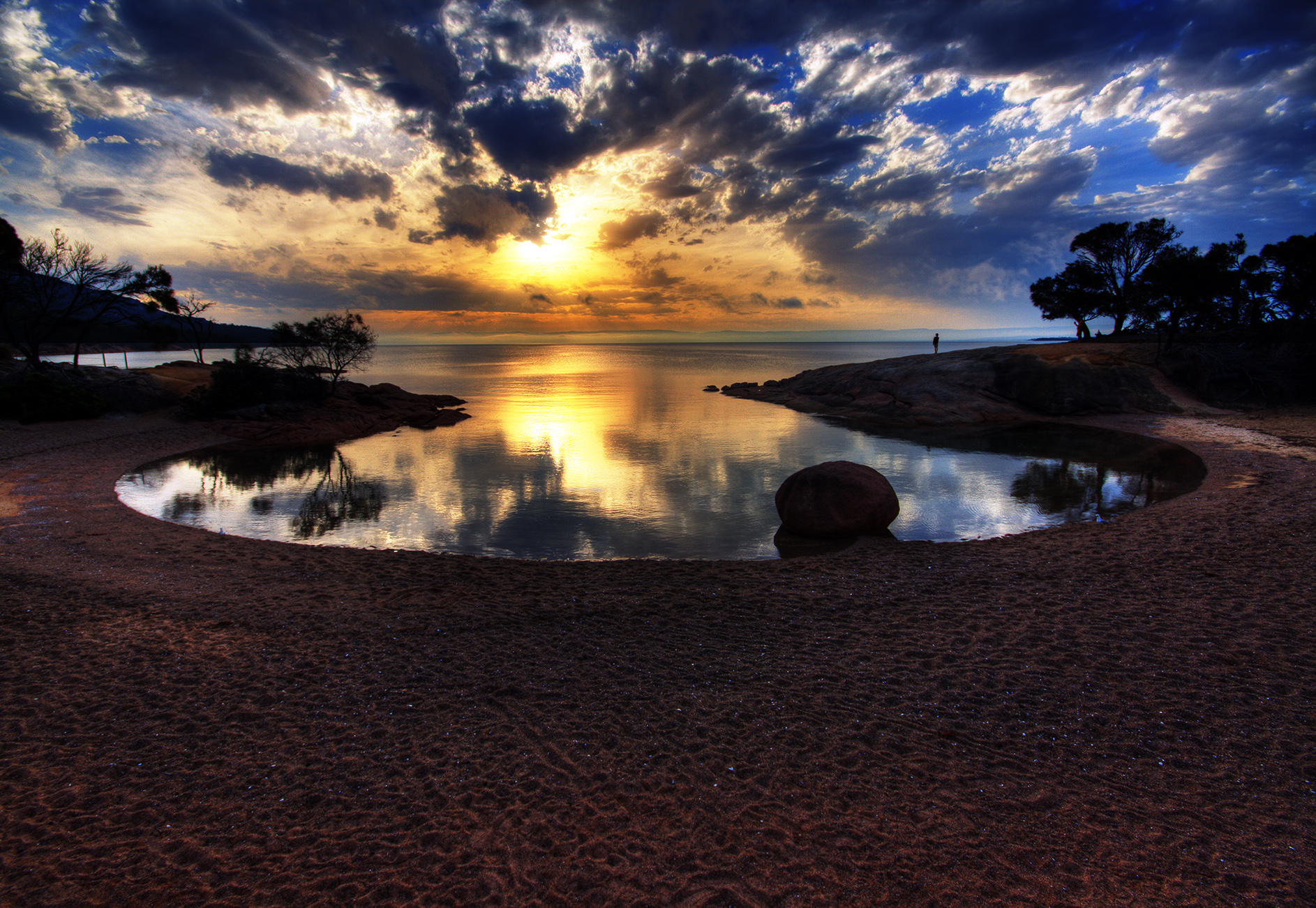
Sunset
