= Utrecht sodomy trials =

1730–31 Dutch persecution of homosexuals

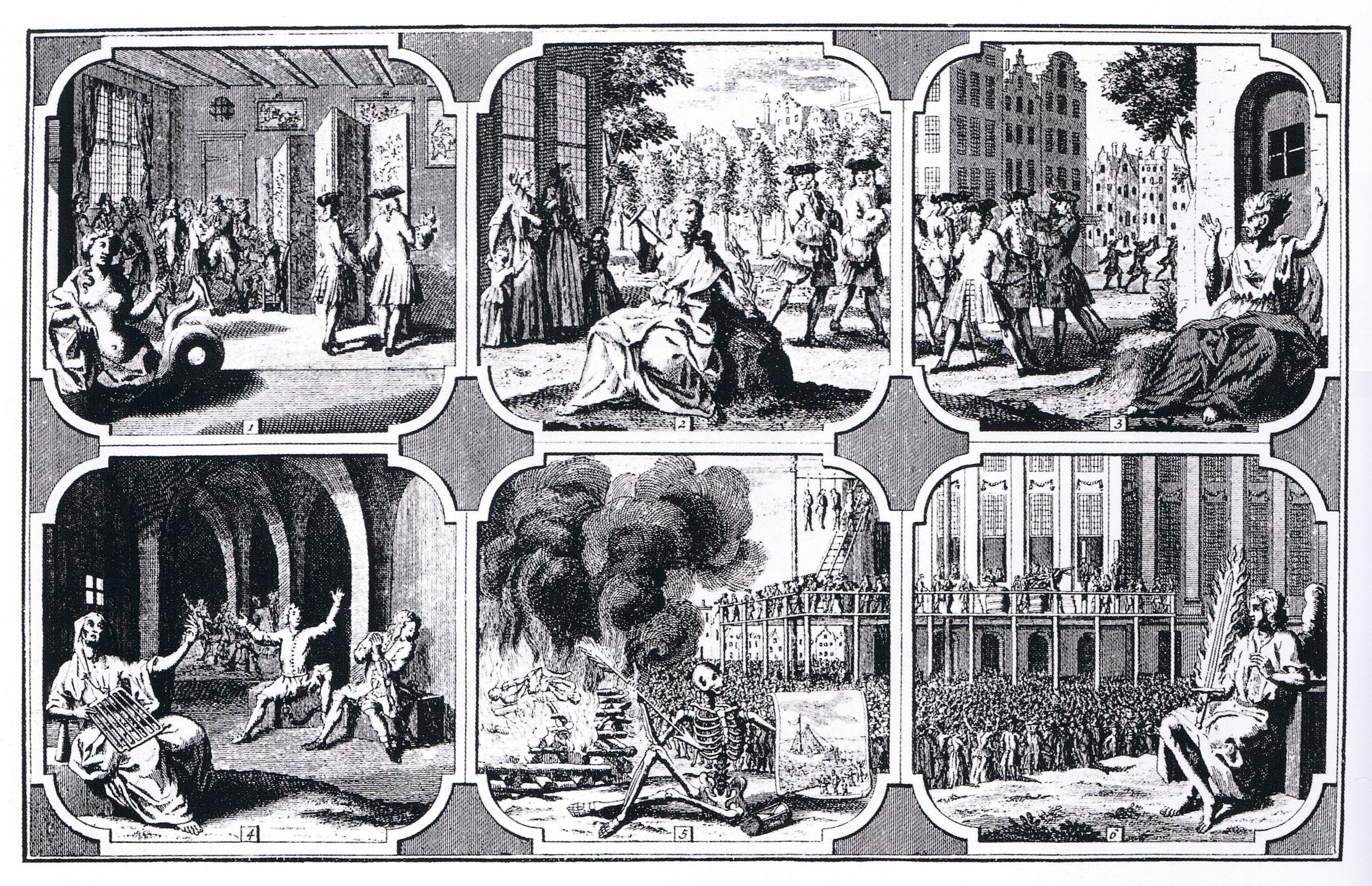
Timely punishment depicted as a warning to godless and damnable sinners. Engraving depicting the Dutch massacre of sodomites. Published in Amsterdam, 1731.

The Utrecht sodomy trials (Dutch: Utrechtse sodomieprocessen) were a large-scale persecution of homosexuals that took place in the Dutch Republic, starting in the city of Utrecht in 1730. Over the following year, the persecution of "sodomites" spread to the rest of the nation, leading to some 250 to 300 trials, often ending in a death sentence, which was often carried out by strangling.

== History ==
As of 1730, the Dutch Republic had just experienced an epizootic disease in its cattle population, while its dikes were threatened by shipworm. Several disasters had hit the country: the flooding of Stavoren in 1657, the collapse of the Utrecht Dom Church's nave in 1674 due to an intense storm now thought to have been a bow echo and the earthquake of 1692 were all ascribed to divine wrath. These circumstances had readied the minds of the Dutch for moral panics, and the homosexual part of the population became their scapegoat.

The ruins of the Dom Church's nave had for years been a meeting place for homosexuals when, in April 1730, the city authorities started an investigation at the request of the Dom's sacristan, Josua Wils. A number of men, including a Zacharias Wilsma, were arrested and interrogated. Their confessions indicated the presence of networks and meeting places of homosexuals elsewhere in the Republic. In July of the same year, Holland followed suit and a nationwide wave of prosecutions ensued; several men in high positions were suspected, but fled before they could be arrested. In Utrecht, some forty men were tried, of whom 18 were convicted and strangled. Death by strangling was the most common punishment for homosexual acts in the Dutch Republic, but other punishments during the 1730–31 purge included hanging and drowning in a barrel of water. The convicts' remains were either burnt, cast into the sea or buried under the gallows. Protestant preachers supported the purge, using among other things the aforementioned shipworm in the Dutch dikes as evidence of God's wrath against homosexuals.

Of the trials outside of Utrecht, those in the village of Zuidhorn in the province of Groningen acquired particular infamy. Grietman Rudolf de Mepsche of Faan used the occasion to persecute his political enemies. He had a total of 22 people sentenced to death and executed, after two more had died at the rack. Overall, though, most accusations appear to have been true, the victims of prosecution having mostly been actual homosexuals, leading Rictor Norton to comment that "this is properly described as a pogrom (...) rather than a hysterical witch-hunt".

== Earlier and later persecutions ==
Several waves of prosecution followed during the eighteenth century: in 1764 (Amsterdam), 1776 (several cities), and 1797 (Utrecht and The Hague). As noted in the case of Joost Schouten, it was preceded by other episodes of persecution and execution, such as that which occurred in Dutch colonial possessions like Batavia, capital of the seventeenth-century Dutch East Indies.

== Sodomonument ==
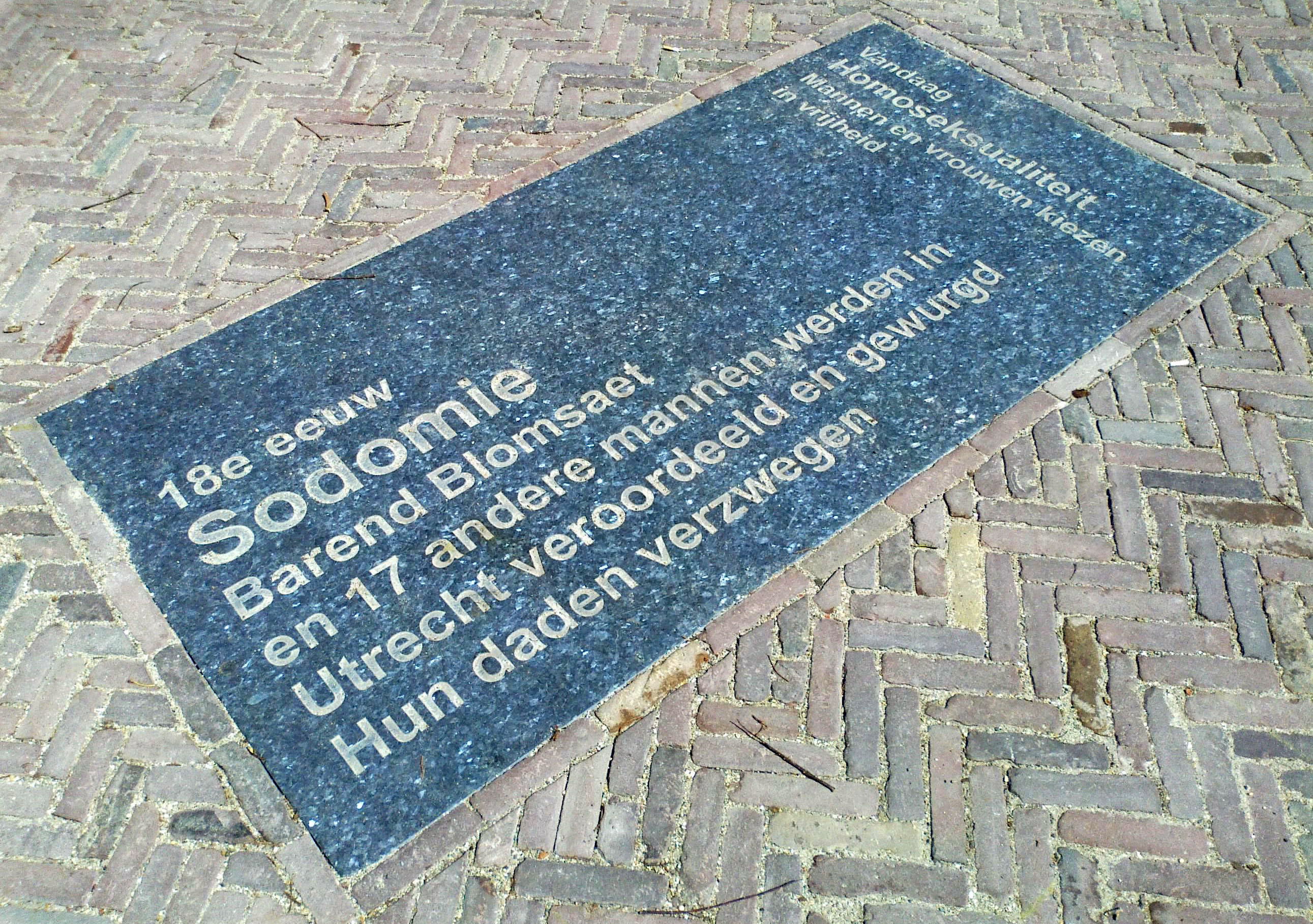

The city of Utrecht has decided to confront this reputation for persecution. The Dom Square was once a place where, in the ruins of the middle nave of the church, gay cruising took place. Since 1999 it has hosted a stone, named the Sodomonument, commemorating the deaths of the persecuted sodomites, and telling that the terminology has changed to homosexuality, and the city wants its women and men to live their lives in freedom.

== Legacy ==
As a result of the trials, the demonym Utrechtenaar gained a second meaning as a slang term to denote homosexuals (first attested in a dictionary of 1861), esp. among students. In common usage, though, it is still used as a demonym, alongside the alternative Utrechter, with the latter being the preferred term in newspapers, while Utrechtenaar is more common on the internet (as of 2004).

== Media ==
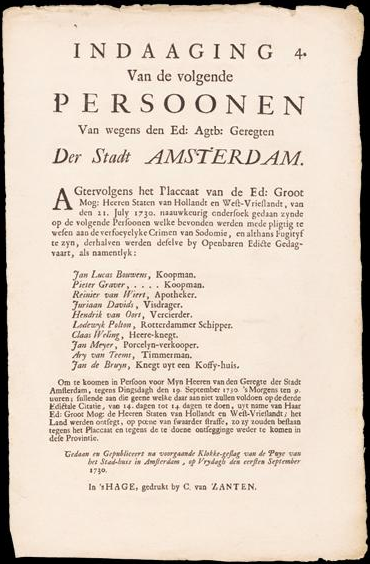
Writ summoning accomplices to sodomy. Amsterdam, 1 September 1730.

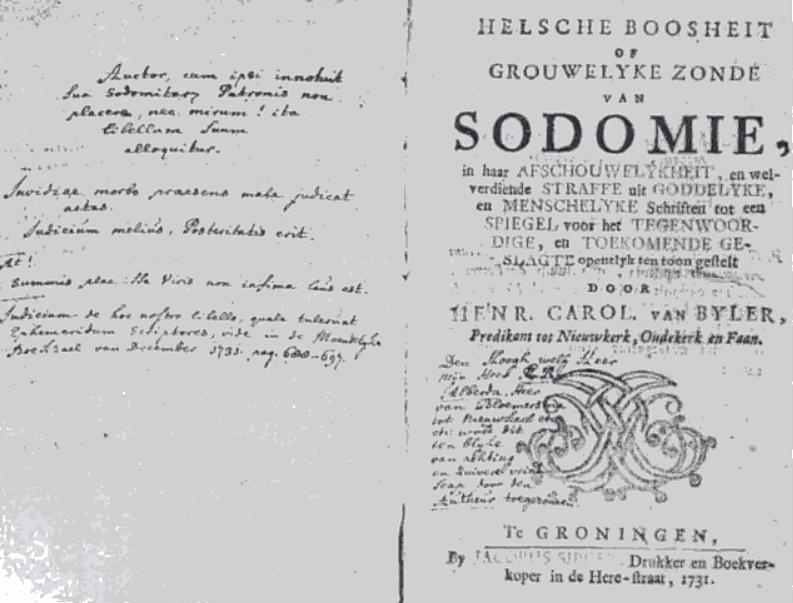
Hellish evil or horrible sin of sodomy. Pamphlet by the Reverend Henricus Carolinus van Bijler, Groningen, 1731.

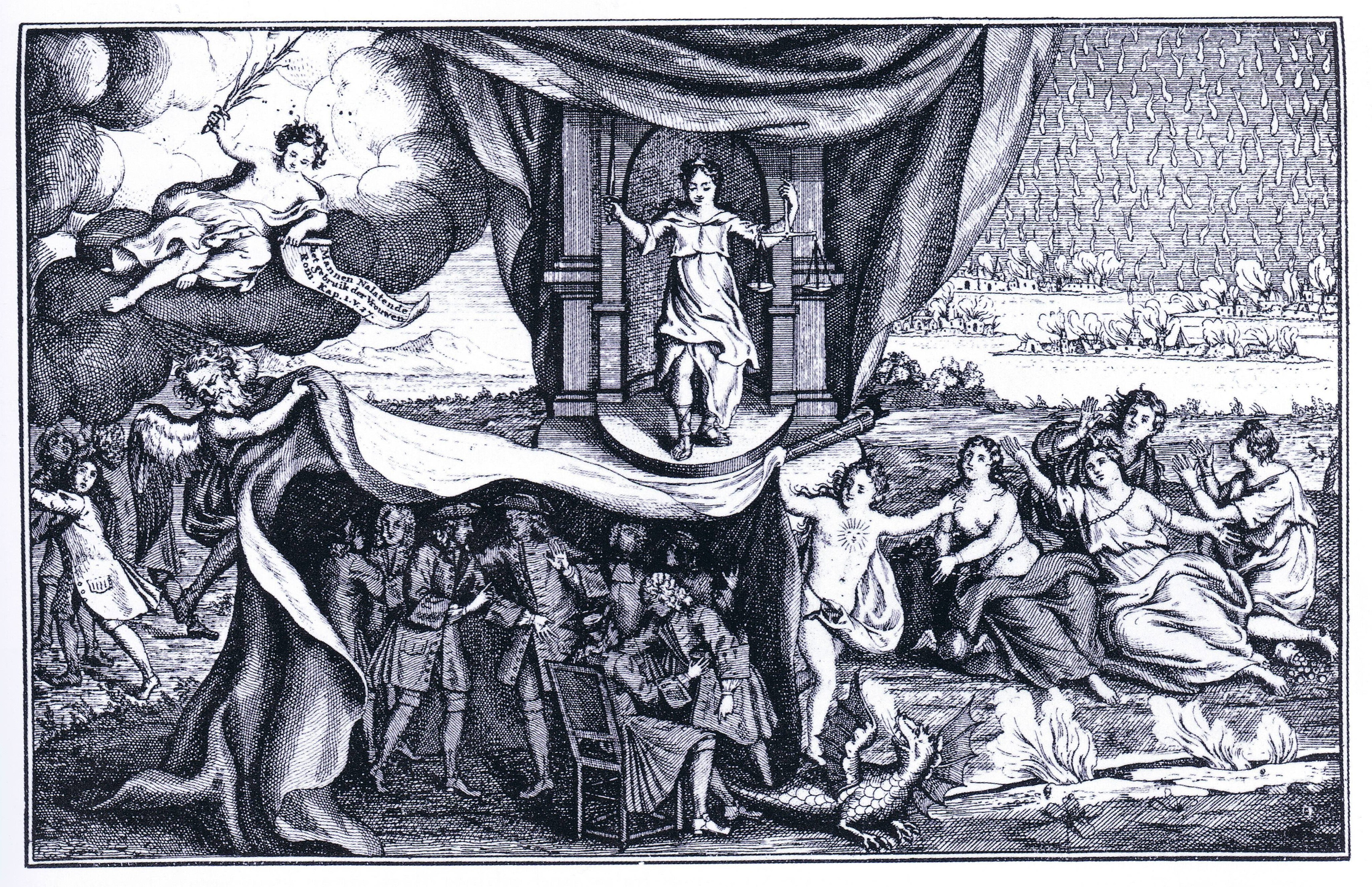
Justice watches the sodomites being uncovered, while fire and brimstone rain down in the background. 1730.

== See also ==
- Leendert Hasenbosch, a Dutch sailor who in 1725 was marooned on Ascension Island as a punishment for sodomy
