= Coles Bay, Tasmania =

Coles Bay
- Town
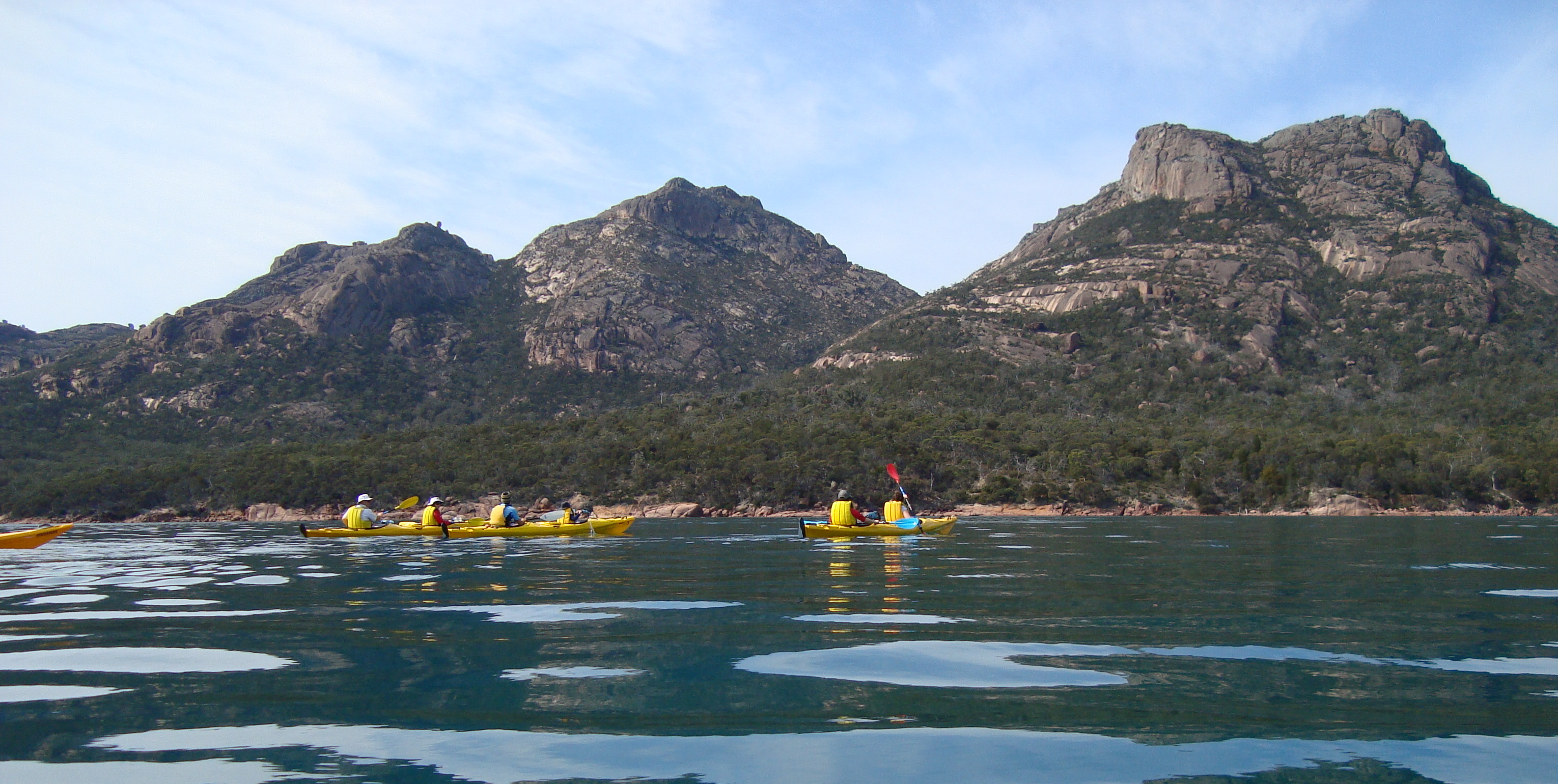
- Sea Kayaking from Muirs Beach, Coles Bay to The Hazards

- Coordinates: 42°07′S 148°17′E
- Country: Australia
- State: Tasmania
- LGA: Glamorgan Spring Bay Council
- Location: 37 km (23 mi) from Bicheno; 43 km (27 mi) from Swansea; 56 km (35 mi) from St Marys; 80 km (50 mi) from Campbell Town

Government
  - State electorate: Lyons
  - Federal division: Lyons

Population
  - Total: 353 (2016 census)
- Postcode: 7215

Coles Bay is an Australian town on the east Coast of Tasmania 192 km north-east of Hobart and 173 km south-east of Launceston, being the main entrance point for visitors to the Freycinet National Park.

It has a population of 515 people including the surrounding area, but many tourists visit the area for its scenery and outdoor activities, which include hiking, biking, fishing, boating and Sea kayaking.

The town is on the northern end of Great Oyster Bay with views of the red and pink granite peaks known as The Hazards, on the Freycinet Peninsula. It is in the area of the Glamorgan Spring Bay Council.

Each Easter the town is one of the three locations for the Australian Three Peaks Race, a continuous sailing and running event starting at Beauty Point just north of Launceston and ending at Hobart with runners scaling three mountains including Mount Freycinet (33 km run; 620 m ascent).

The Freycinet Challenge is held annually in Coles Bay, held in the month of October. The challenge features ocean kayaking, road biking, and running, compared to the traditional Triathlon.

== History ==
Whaling parties, tin and coal miners and pastoralists are some of the many people who have lived and worked on the Freycinet Peninsula since European settlement. Old mine shafts and abandoned farmers' huts remain today and attract tourists. A shore-based whaling station was established by George Meredith in 1824. It only ever operated in the winter months and had been abandoned by the 1850s.

In 1916 the area along with Mount Field became Tasmania's first national park.

Coles Bay Post Office opened on 21 December 1953.

== Population ==
In the 2021 Census, there were 515 people in Coles Bay. 54.0% of people were born in Australia and 62.7% of people spoke only English at home, The most common response for religion was No Religion at 42.5%.

== Plastic shopping bag ban ==
The town became one of the first in the world to ban plastic shopping bags in April 2003, after a two-year campaign. Local bakery owner and Coles Bay Tourism Association president Ben Kearney organised all the Coles Bay retailers to stop using plastic bags and worked with Planet Ark to introduce alternatives including recycled paper bags which can be purchased for a small fee and reusable calico shopping bags. On Australia Day 2005 Ben Kearney was declared Australia's Local Hero for 2005 for his commitment to the environment.

The Tasmanian Government awarded Coles Bay an Environmental Excellence Award for banning use of plastic bags.

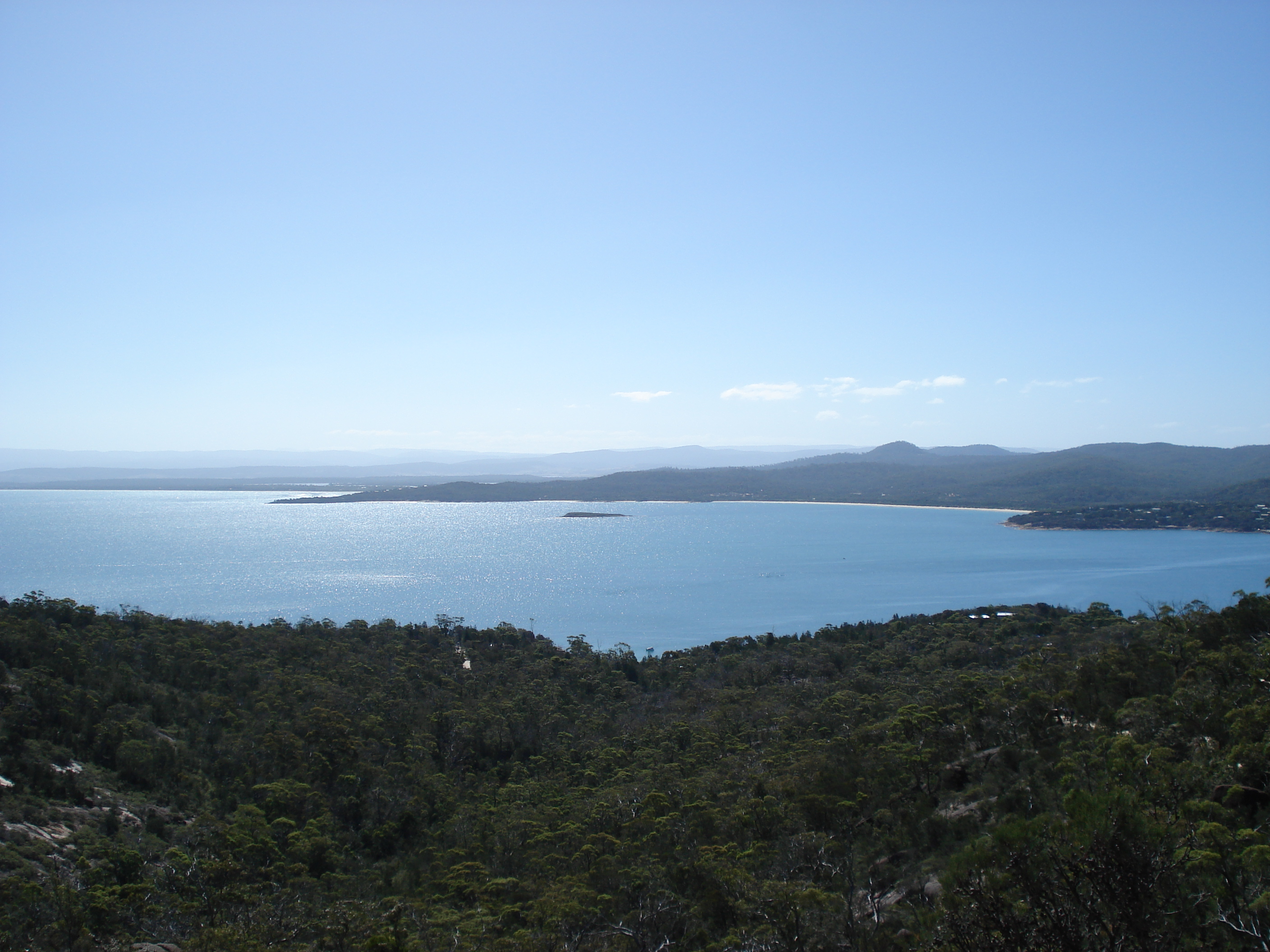
Great Oyster Bay and Coles Bay township from the Freycinet National Park
