= Freycinet National Park =

National park in Tasmania, Australia

- IUCN category II (national park)
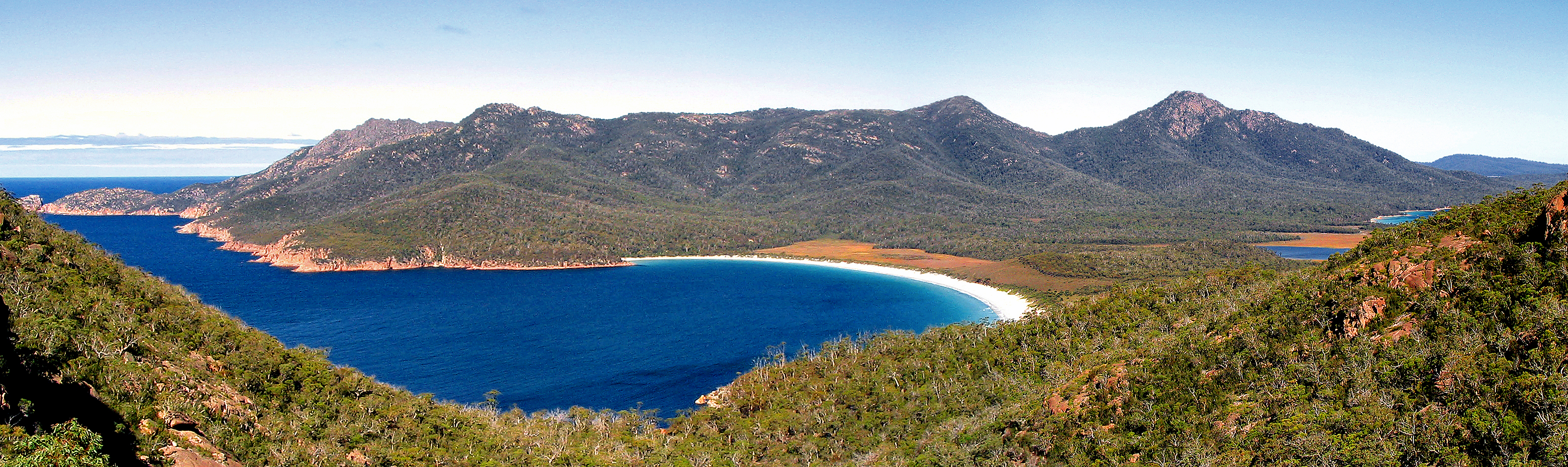
- Wineglass Bay

- Location within Tasmania
- Interactive map of Freycinet National Park
- Location: Tasmania
- Nearest city: Coles Bay
- Coordinates: 42°07′31″S 148°17′54″E
- Area: 169 km^{2} (65 sq mi)
- Established: 1916
- Visitors: 200000 (in 2008)
- Governing body: Tasmania Parks and Wildlife Service
- Website: Official website

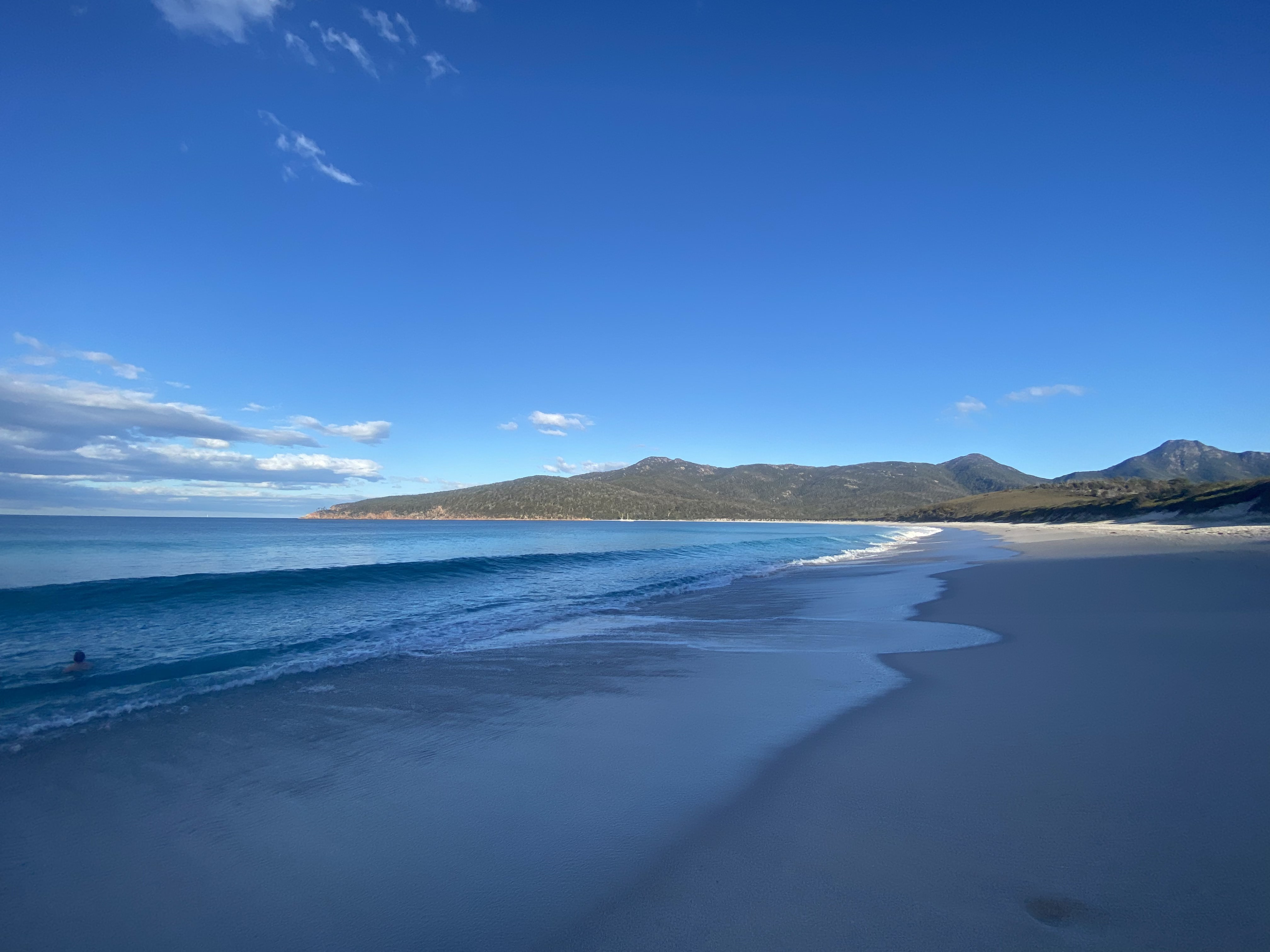
Wineglass Bay viewed from the beach.

Freycinet National Park is a national park on the east coast of Tasmania, Australia, 125 kilometres (78 mi) northeast of Hobart. It occupies a large part of the Freycinet Peninsula, named after French navigator Louis de Freycinet, and Schouten Island. Founded in 1916, it is Tasmania's oldest park, along with Mount Field National Park. Bordering the national park is the small settlement of Coles Bay, and the largest nearby town is Swansea. Freycinet contains part of the rugged Tasmanian coastline and includes the secluded Wineglass Bay. Features of the park include its red and pink granite formations and a series of jagged granite peaks in a line, called "The Hazards".

Because of the range of rare and endemic flora and fauna species present, as well as the diversity of landscapes and communities at Freycinet National Park, its role in conservation is particularly significant. The area within the park is also of cultural importance, with many Aboriginal and European sites protected, though deeper investigation into human history within the park still needs to be undertaken. Large sections of the park remain undisturbed by humans, including parts of the catchment and the landscape.

Tourism at Freycinet forms a significant component of the economy for the eastern part of Tasmania, with visitors drawn to the region by the natural environment, weather and recreational activities available in the area. Every year thousands of people are attracted to the coastal environments and the area's rural and isolated setting.

== Geology ==
Devonian granite is the dominant rock type at Freycinet. Orthoclase, a pink feldspar, gives the mountains and coastline their characteristic pink tint. Black micas and white quartz are also found. The western side of Schouten Island is composed of Jurassic dolerite.

== Ecology ==
Dolphins swimming in Wineglass Bay.

Forty-nine species endemic to Tasmania are found at Freycinet. Mammals found include the brushtail possum, ringtail possum, sugar glider, eastern pygmy possum, little pygmy possum, echidna, wombats, New Holland mouse, swamp rat, water rat, Tasmanian bettong and the long-nosed potoroo.

The Tasmanian devil was once common at the park, but has seen a significant drop in density due to the devil facial tumour disease. Cetaceans such as southern right whale, humpback whale, and bottlenose dolphins are known to use the bay to feed, calve or to take rests.

=== Flora ===
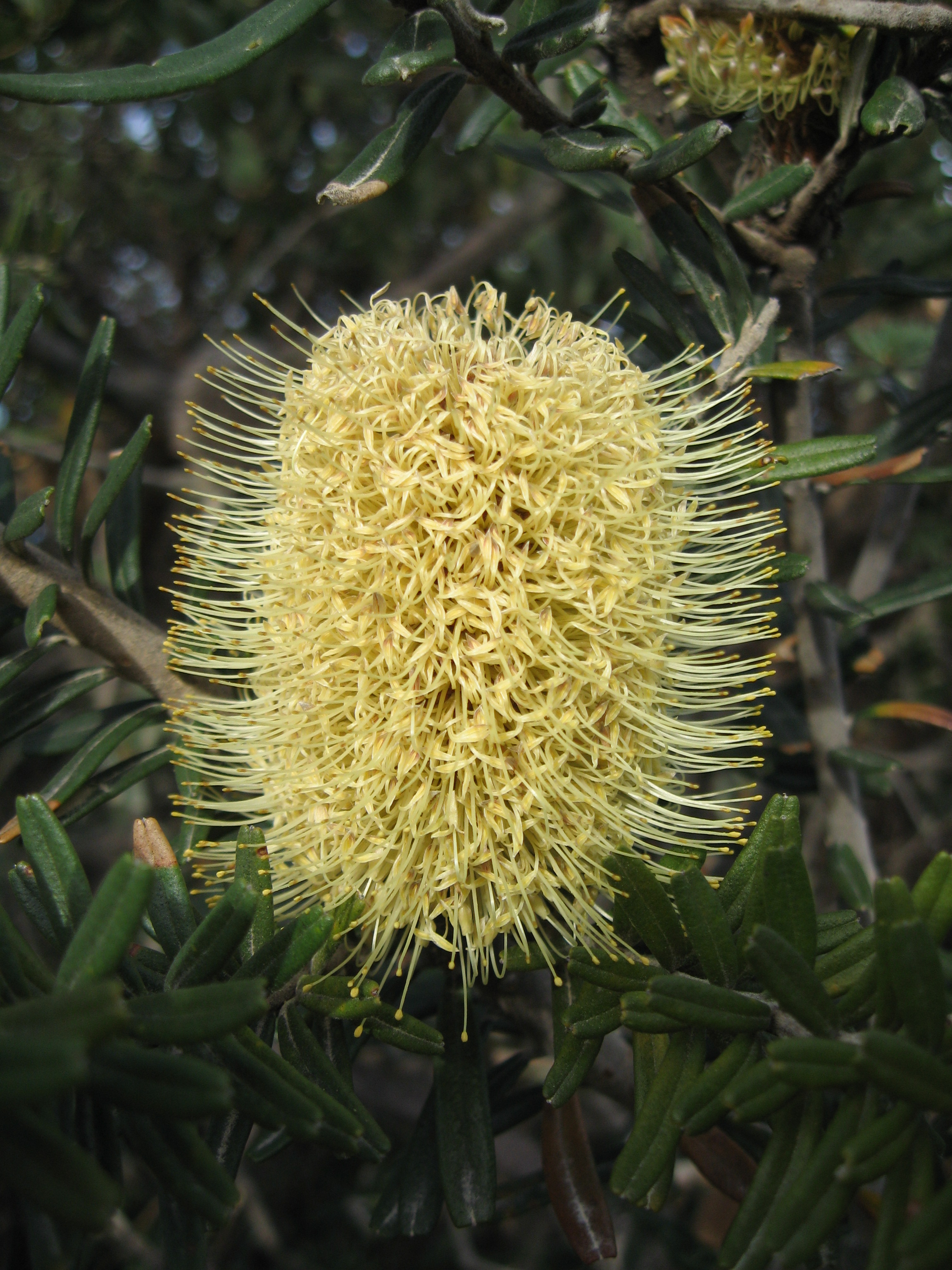
Banksia marginata found in Freycinet National Park.

The vegetation in Freycinet National Park is indicative of temperature ranges and precipitation, just as it is through the rest of Tasmania. In this part of the state it is dominated by dry sclerophyll forests and woodlands, with black peppermint (Eucalyptus amygdalina) growing over an understorey of varying heaths such as Banksia spp., Leptospermum spp., Thryptomene spp., Melaleuca spp. and Calytrix spp. in the area of Hazards Lagoon. West of the lagoon the coastal scrub consists of Acacia longifolia with a thick forest of Allocasuarina verticillata, and to the east Eucalyptus ovata and Eucalyptus obliqua dominate the dry woodlands.

More than 500 plants have been recorded within the park, with over 80 species of orchids being sighted. Several species have a restricted distribution and numerous species, such as Melaleuca pustulata, Cyphanthera tasmanica, Epacris barbata and Westringia brevifolia var. raleighi are listed under the Tasmanian Threatened Species Protection Act 1995 (TSP Act).

=== Fauna ===
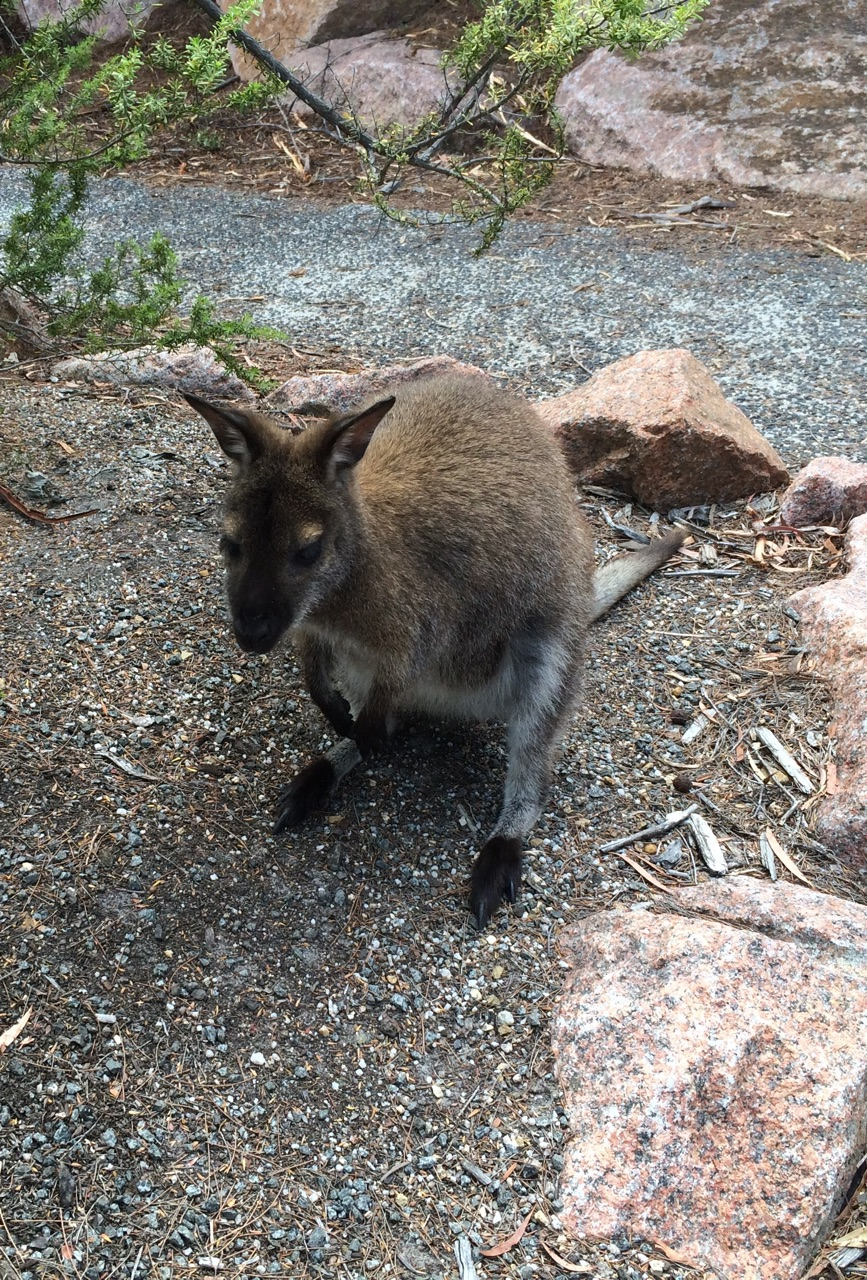
Bennett's Wallaby (Macropus rufogriseus).

==== Mammals ====
The red-necked wallaby, also called Bennett's wallaby (Macropus rufogriseus), is one of the most commonly seen animals within the park and can be spotted grazing on low lying vegetation such as grass, they are also known to gather around people. Another common species seen is the eastern quoll (Dasyurus viverrinus), a marsupial carnivore which was previously sighted on the mainland of Australia but is now only found in Tasmania. Also extinct on the mainland, the Tasmanian pademelon (Thylogale billardierii) is still common in Freycinet National Park but they are rarely seen during the day, coming out at night to feed.

Echidna (Tachyglossus aculeatus) searching for food among sand dunes at Friendly Beaches.

Echidnas (Tachyglossus aculeatus) can be seen during the day foraging through litter on forest floors, or among coastal vegetation, searching for ants or other food sources. The eastern pygmy possum (Cercartetus nanus) and the little pygmy possum (Cercartetus lepidus) are listed as vulnerable in several mainland Australian states but are not listed in Tasmania, and although they can be found at Freycinet, sightings of them are uncommon. The New Holland mouse (Pseudomys novaehollandiae) is listed as endangered under the Tasmanian TSP Act and sightings are rare, but it is known to be present within Freycinet National Park.

==== Reptiles and amphibians ====
There are numerous reptiles that are found at Freycinet including lizards, skinks and snakes. The ocellated skink (Niveoscincus ocellatus), Tasmanian tree skink (Niveoscincus pretiosus) and she-oak skink (Cyclodomorphus casuarinae) are all endemic to Tasmania and found in the park. Other species found include the blotched blue-tongued lizard (Tiliqua nigrolutea), mountain dragon (Rankinia diemensis) and lowland copperhead snake (Austrelaps superbus). The Tasmanian froglet (Ranidella tasmaniensis) is also endemic to Tasmania and can be seen in several creeks in Freycinet, along with the frequently spotted common eastern froglet (Crinia signifera) found in low-lying water bodies such as swamps. Other amphibians found include the southern toadlet (Pseudophryne semimarmorata), spotted grass frog (Limnodynastes tasmaniensis), southern brown tree frog (Litoria ewingii) and growling grass frog (Litoria raniformis).

==== Birds ====
White-bellied sea eagle sitting on a tree (Haliaeetus leucogaster).

Owing to the varying ecosystems in Freycinet there are many species of birds that either inhabit or fly through the park. They range from large predator species such as the brown falcon (Falco berigora) and white-bellied sea eagle (Haliaeetus leucogaster) to smaller species including the superb fairy-wren (Malurus cyaneus) and flame robin (Petroica phoenicea). There are also several species which are listed on the TSP Act, such as the black-browed albatross (Thalassarche melanophris), shy albatross (Thalassarche cauta), Tasmanian wedge-tailed eagle (Aquila audax fleayi), white-fronted tern (Sterna striata), Australian fairy tern (Sternula nereis nereis) and the swift parrot (Lathamus discolor). The endangered swift parrot breeds on the east coast of Tasmania from September through to January, their movements corresponding to the flowering of several Eucalyptus spp. before they migrate to the mainland over winter.

== Climate ==
The park receives on average 600 mm (23.6 in.) of rain per year. It has a climate similar to that of Southern France with on average more than 300 days of sunshine.

Climate data for Friendly Beaches
Month	Jan	Feb	Mar	Apr	May	Jun	Jul	Aug	Sep	Oct	Nov	Dec	Year
Record high °C (°F)	36.4 (97.5)	37.0 (98.6)	37.0 (98.6)	31.4 (88.5)	24.0 (75.2)	21.0 (69.8)	19.0 (66.2)	23.5 (74.3)	27.0 (80.6)	32.7 (90.9)	35.0 (95.0)	37.0 (98.6)	37.0 (98.6)
Mean daily maximum °C (°F)	22.8 (73.0)	22.6 (72.7)	21.4 (70.5)	18.6 (65.5)	16.1 (61.0)	14.1 (57.4)	13.7 (56.7)	14.7 (58.5)	16.7 (62.1)	18.0 (64.4)	19.5 (67.1)	21.8 (71.2)	18.3 (64.9)
Mean daily minimum °C (°F)	13.1 (55.6)	13.2 (55.8)	11.8 (53.2)	9.6 (49.3)	8.3 (46.9)	6.4 (43.5)	5.7 (42.3)	6.1 (43.0)	7.5 (45.5)	8.6 (47.5)	10.0 (50.0)	11.6 (52.9)	9.3 (48.7)
Record low °C (°F)	6.0 (42.8)	7.2 (45.0)	5.3 (41.5)	1.0 (33.8)	−1.1 (30.0)	0.0 (32.0)	−0.5 (31.1)	−0.1 (31.8)	1.2 (34.2)	1.2 (34.2)	3.0 (37.4)	5.5 (41.9)	−1.1 (30.0)
Average precipitation mm (inches)	61.2 (2.41)	60.3 (2.37)	53.7 (2.11)	50.3 (1.98)	47.0 (1.85)	36.2 (1.43)	48.5 (1.91)	48.7 (1.92)	33.3 (1.31)	65.2 (2.57)	58.8 (2.31)	36.6 (1.44)	601.7 (23.69)
Source: Bureau of Meteorology

== Environmental threats ==
There are numerous threats to species within Freycinet National Park, and with recreation and tourism in natural areas becoming increasingly popular further stresses can be placed on flora and fauna already struggling to survive. There can be many impacts caused by the building and maintenance of roads, tracks, lookouts and various types of accommodation. A study conducted by Jones observed that species such as the Tasmanian devil and eastern quoll are more susceptible to being killed by cars after road upgrades to increase the volume of tourist traffic.

There can also be direct and indirect damage to vegetation and habitats from activities such as bushwalking and horse riding, as well as an increased risk of alterations to soil characteristics and the transmission of disease. An example of this is the fungus Phytophthora cinnamomi, which numerous plant families in Freycinet National Park are susceptible to, and which also places rare and endangered species at greater risk of extinction. Visitors to the park may also inadvertently bring in seeds of weeds on clothing or equipment.

One of the most serious threats faced by any species within Freycinet is the devil facial tumour which has seen the Tasmanian devil's (Sarcophilus harrisii) conservation status upgraded in 2008 to endangered under the TSP Act. Studies have shown there has been a decline in the population of the Tasmanian devil in the area, with this decrease in numbers being associated with the devil facial tumour. This infectious disease, caused by a transmissible cancer has become a serious threat to populations of devils throughout Tasmania and has seen a change to the age structure within the population at Freycinet National Park. A decrease in breeding age adults has placed pressure on the persistence of the species with most females now only having the opportunity to breed once rather than typically producing offspring annually for 3 years after the age of two.

The loss of Tasmanian devils also places other species within Freycinet National Park at risk, as the decline of such a predator could alter interactions between other species. For instance, research has shown that the eastern quoll is in decline at Freycinet as well as other parts of the state. It is possible the changes occurring due to the decline of the Tasmanian devil are affecting the behaviour of other predators and species.

Threats that are faced by the endangered eastern quoll, which are common to many species, and include introduced species, increasing dry conditions and modifications to habitats are also faced by the Tasmanian bettong (Bettongia gaimardi). A recent study showed a decline in observations of the Tasmanian bettong with the occurrence of feral cats, though further research is still required to determine if this introduced species is a predator of B. gaimardi and if the Tasmanian bettong is susceptible like some Australian mammals to the disease toxoplasmosis carried by cats.

Friendly Beaches.

== Management ==
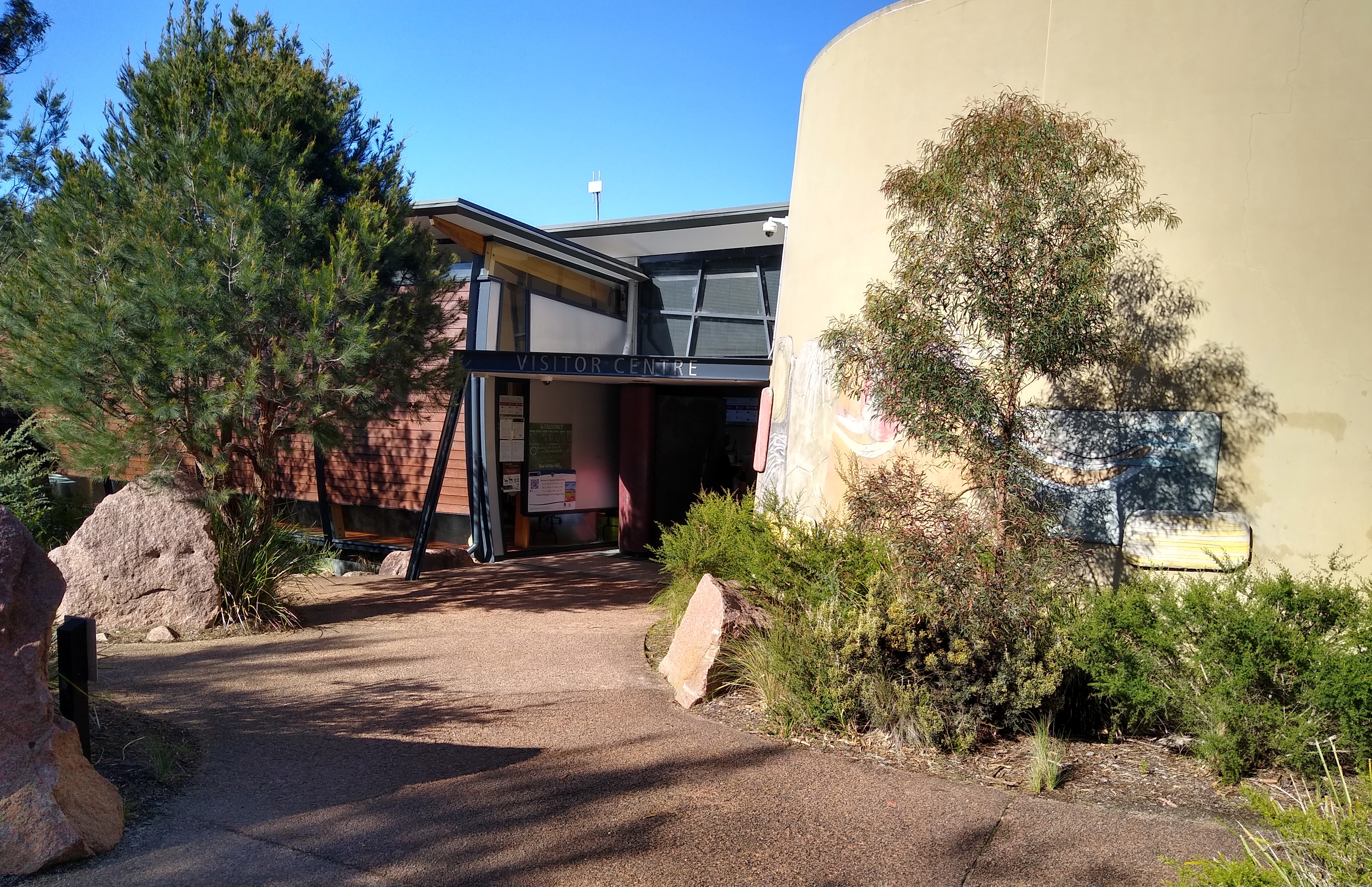
Freycinet National Park Visitor Centre

=== Management plans ===
As directed under the National Parks and Wildlife Act 1970, the Freycinet National Park, Wye State Reserve Management Plan was developed in 2000. This plan outlines the objectives and visions for the park, with a focus on conservation and protection of species and ecosystems. The plan has since been altered in 2004 in response to changing circumstances, and was again updated in 2015.

=== Public awareness ===
The use of public programs and signs in national parks to make people aware of the dangers of feeding wildlife has been shown to be of benefit in Freycinet National Park. Signs were constructed in an attempt to make people aware that feeding native species could not only make animals more susceptible to predators, but also cause diseases, including bone deformities, and social disturbances. A study conducted by Mallick and Driessen showed that there has been an increase in awareness to not feed wildlife and the majority of people had seen information related to the 'keep wildlife wild' program.

== Preservation ==
Throughout the 1900s there was a significant loss of over 60% of core wilderness in Tasmania, however during this time there was also a huge increase in the amount of wilderness area which became protected in the reserve system. Locations on the Freycinet Peninsula, along with Mount William and Maria Island were the only areas on the east coast which had not vanished. It has been suggested locations in the reserve system included minimal variation in community types and land which had been deemed of little economic importance, and it wasn't until the 1970s and onwards when management for conservation became more of a priority. It has perhaps proven beneficial in terms of biodiversity that areas within Freycinet National Park were unsuitable for practices such as farming or other economic gain.

The bioregion and catchment which Freycinet National Park is a part of are seen as having a low variegated landscape, with 80-90% of native vegetation still intact. Delegation of this area as a national park has allowed numerous species to be protected, including some which are vulnerable or endangered, with the primary objective being to protect the habitats of native flora and fauna. Making Freycinet a protected area has not only allowed for relevant management actions to be carried out, but it also means the prohibition of land clearing and the grazing of stock within the park. Although flora and fauna still face risks to their survival, having the benefits of legislation and funding that is provided by having habitats within the park aids in raising not only the chances of survival but awareness of these species. Government agencies are also able to conduct monitoring of species responses to any threats on a regular basis.

An example of such species is the sand grass tree (Xanthorrhoea arenaria), which is endemic to Tasmania and can only be found at a few locations in the state. It is also listed as vulnerable at both a national and state level by the Environment Protection and Biodiversity Conservation Act 1999 (EPBC Act) and the TSP Act. As Freycinet National Park is managed for conservation, strategies have been implemented which aim to prevent the spread of the disease Phytophthora cinnamomi throughout the populations of this species and threaten the number of individuals surviving in the park. Due to the confusion in separating this species from Xanthorrhoea bracteata exact population estimates are difficult to achieve, but as they are known to occur at locations within Freycinet National Park this assists in their conservation with regards to some threatening processes including land clearing for development.

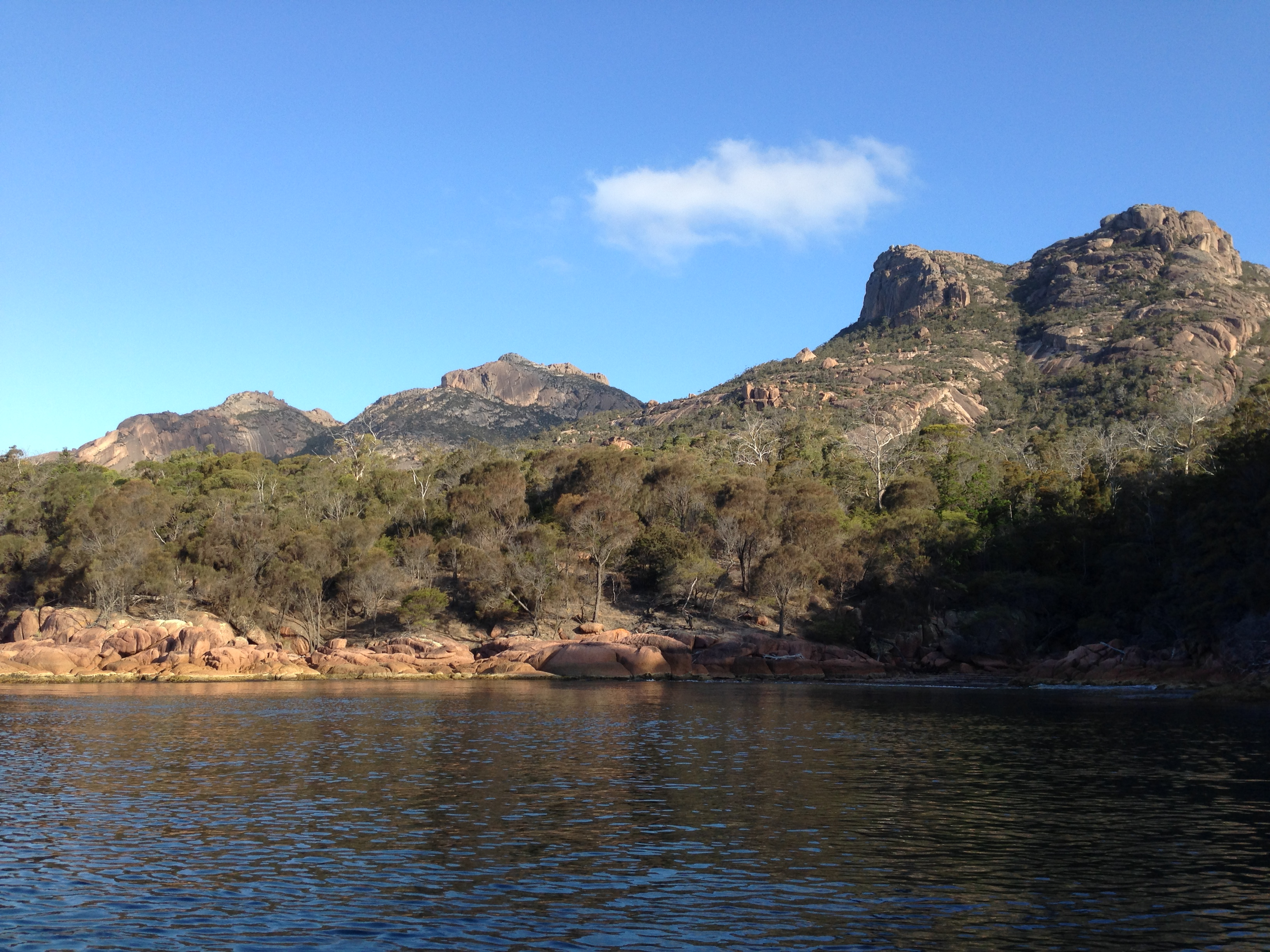
The Hazards.

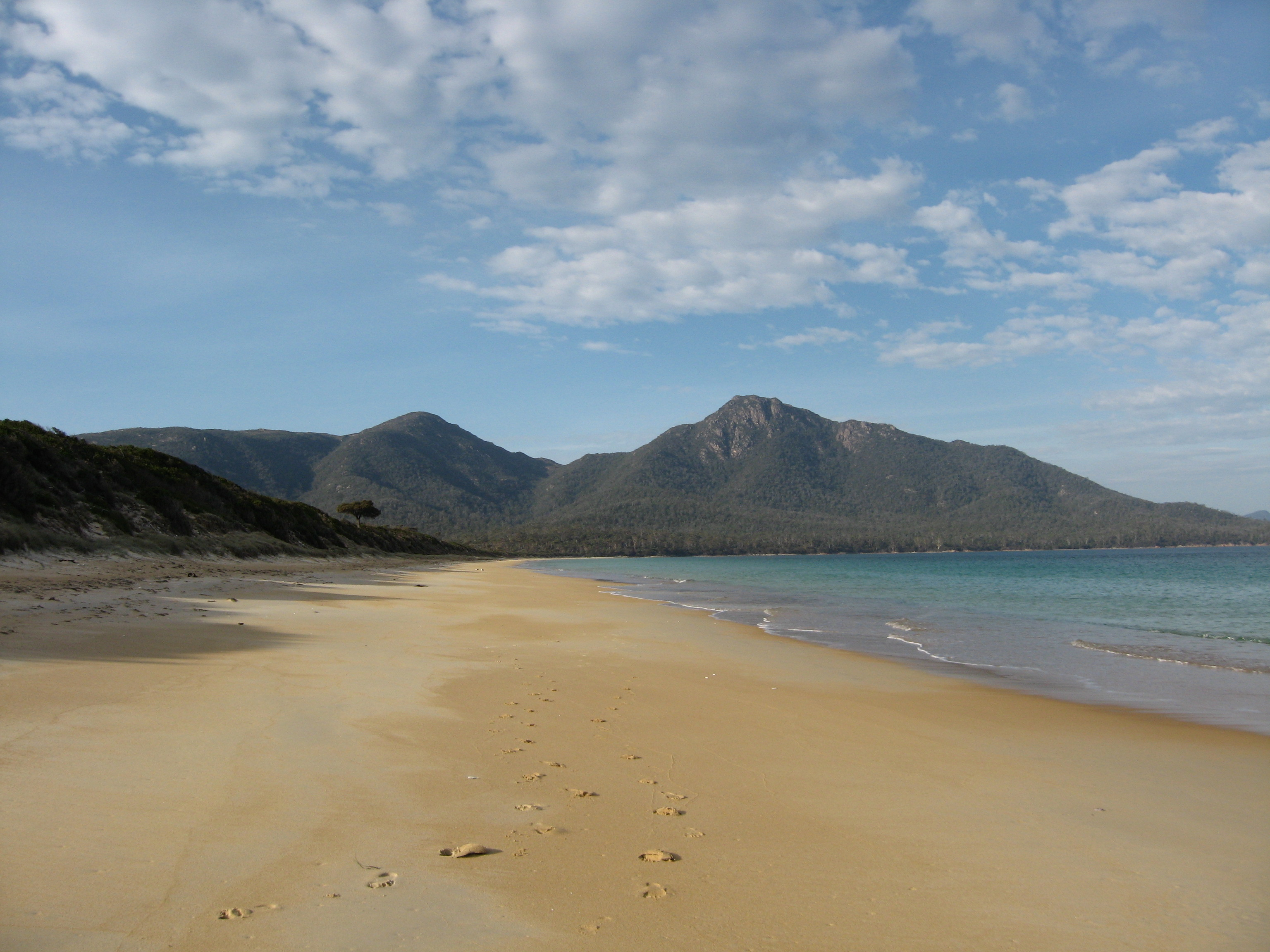
Hazards Beach.

Similarly, Philotheca freyciana, or the Freycinet Waxflower, is listed by the Commonwealth EPBC Act and the Tasmanian TSP Act as endangered. This species only occurs on the Freycinet Peninsula and can mostly be found dispersed among granite rocks of the Hazards within Freycinet National Park, where approximately 100 individuals have been recorded. Initially only 3 plants were recorded to exist, but after surveys were conducted by staff from numerous government agencies throughout the Freycinet Peninsula over 100 individuals were found in areas around The Hazards, but none elsewhere, highlighting the importance of their conservation within the national park. Due to its occurrence within the park P. freyciana is able to be monitored and threats to its survival can be identified until further surveys and studies can be done on the species to gain a greater understanding of it. Given the very specific requirements for the growth of P. freyciana it is believed the chances of any further populations growing outside their occurrence in Freycinet National Park is small.

Known to occur with P. freyciana is Epacris barbata which is also listed as endangered under the EPBC Act and the TSP Act. This species is endemic to Tasmania and occurs mostly within Freycinet National Park, with only one population found outside the park. E. barbata is susceptible to Phytophthora cinnamomi, and not only do sites undergo regular monitoring for infestation by the pathogen but wash stations have also been installed in an attempt to reduce transmission from bushwalkers. Such measures can be implemented by government agencies who have the knowledge and equipment required to assist in protection within a national park, while the necessary level of protection for a species may be unavailable for those that fall outside such protected areas.

These species are also known to have varying requirements with regards to fire and the intensity and frequency for which they can regenerate. Any planned burns within the park, that form part of management plans, can take these species into consideration to protect them.

Previously believed to be extinct, the New Holland mouse was discovered in Tasmania in 1970s. Owing to its restricted habitat in the state it is considered rare, but there are several key population sites within Freycinet, including Friendly Beaches. These protected locations provide the species with preferred environmental conditions, such as a sandy substrate for burrows, combined with a mixed understorey of flora as a food source.

The conservation of Freycinet also provides protection of habitats important for the swift parrot. The species is known to move along the east coast of Tasmania with Eucalyptus ovata being one of its main food sources. Swift parrots are found breeding up to 10 km from the coastline on ridges and slopes of Eucalyptus woodlands and forests, such as those of Freycinet. The protection of the vegetation within Freycinet National Park is a vital component in the survival of the endangered species, providing breeding sites, food resources and assisting in the movement of the species during migration.

Similarly, Freycinet and its surrounds are of significance to the Tasmanian wedge-tailed eagle and white-bellied sea eagle, with there being an overlap in management and habitat requirements of the swift parrot. Both eagle species have specific requirements for nesting which notably includes the absence of disturbance and presence of water nearby. The protection provided by Freycinet National Park assists in providing suitable habitat for both species by denying the development of plantations and urbanisation of the environment.

== See also ==
- Protected areas of Tasmania
- Federal Hotels
