= The Hazards =

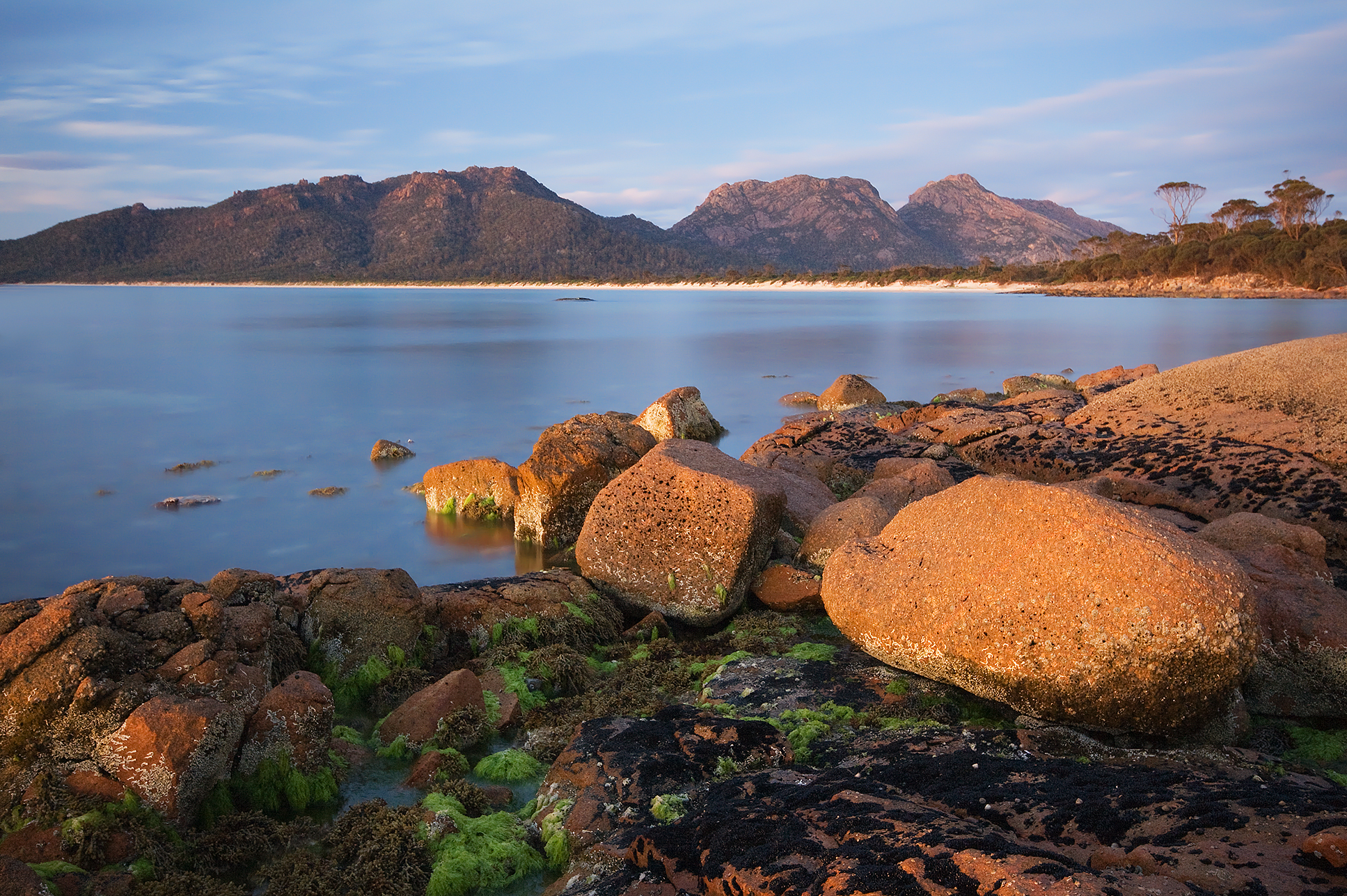
- The Hazards from the southern section of Hazard Beach

Highest point
- Elevation: 485 m (1,591 ft)
- Coordinates: 42°09′S 148°18′E

Geography
- Location within Tasmania
- Location: East Coast Tasmania

Geology
- Mountain type: Granite

The Hazards are a mountain range in the Freycinet National Park on the east coast of Tasmania, Australia. The range is positioned between Coles Bay and Wineglass Bay and are said to be named after a local whaler, African-American Captain Richard Hazard. The range consists of five mountains: Mayson (415 m), Amos (454 m), Dove (485 m), Baudin (413 m) and Parson (331 m).

== Features and location ==
The Hazards are made of granite. Orthoclase, a pink feldspar, gives the mountains their pink tint. The track to Wineglass Bay and lookout runs over the saddle between Mounts Mayson and Amos.

There is also a resort in Coles Bay utilising the name of the geographical feature, and travel information also includes local information about locations from where the Hazards can be viewed.

== See also ==
- List of mountains of Tasmania
