= Schouten Island =

Island off eastern Tasmania

Schouten Island (Tiggana marraboona)
Schouten's Isle
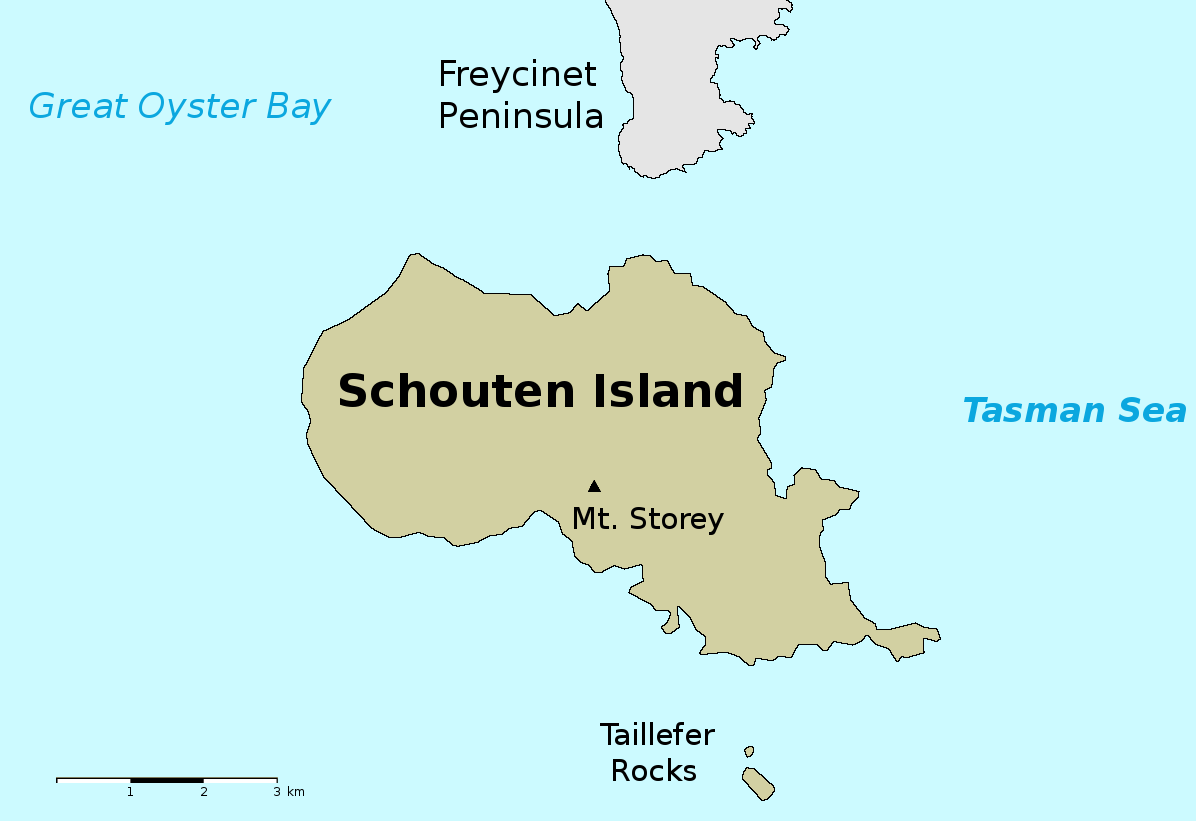
- Map of Schouten Island

- Location within Tasmania
- Etymology: In honour of Joost Schouten, a member of the Council of the Dutch East India Company; named in 1642 by Abel Tasman.

Geography
- Location: East coast of Tasmania
- Coordinates: 42°18′36″S 148°16′12″E
- Archipelago: Schouten Island Group
- Adjacent to: Tasman Sea
- Area: 28 km^{2} (11 sq mi)
- Highest elevation: 400 m (1300 ft)
- Highest point: Mount Storey

Administration
- Australia
- State: Tasmania
- Local government area: Glamorgan Spring Bay Council

Additional information
- Time zone: AEST (UTC+10)
  - Summer (DST): AEDT (UTC+11)
- Freycinet National Park

Schouten Island (formerly Schouten's Isle), part of the Schouten Island Group, is an island with an area of approximately 28 square kilometres (11 sq mi) lying close to the eastern coast of Tasmania, Australia, located 1.6 kilometres (0.99 mi) south of the Freycinet Peninsula and is a part of Freycinet National Park. The palawa kani place name for the island is mayaluwarana.

The locality of Schouten Island is in the local government area of Glamorgan–Spring Bay in the South-east region of Tasmania.

== History ==
Schouten Island lies within the territory of the Oyster Bay tribe of Tasmanian Aborigines and kitchen middens show that Indigenous people lived on the island prior to European settlement. In 1642, while surveying the south-west coast of Tasmania, Abel Tasman named the island after Joost Schouten, a member of the Council of the Dutch East India Company.

Members of the Baudin expedition landed on Schouten in 1802. In the early 19th century, sealers were active in the area and are known to have visited the island. Shore-based whaling stations operated on the island in the 1830s and 1840s at five different locations.

The discovery of coal on the island in 1809 by a sealer, John Stacey, led to between 1842 and 1925, several phases of coal and tin mining between 1842 and 1925. In 1880, a small number of Chinese men worked the ground for tin. Stacey found that 200 to 300 hectares (490 to 740 acres) of land could be suitable for cultivation. Plans to use convict labour to mine coal on the island in the 1840s were never realised. From 1850, Schouten was used for grazing sheep, with the last grazing lease expiring in 1969.

== Topography and geology ==
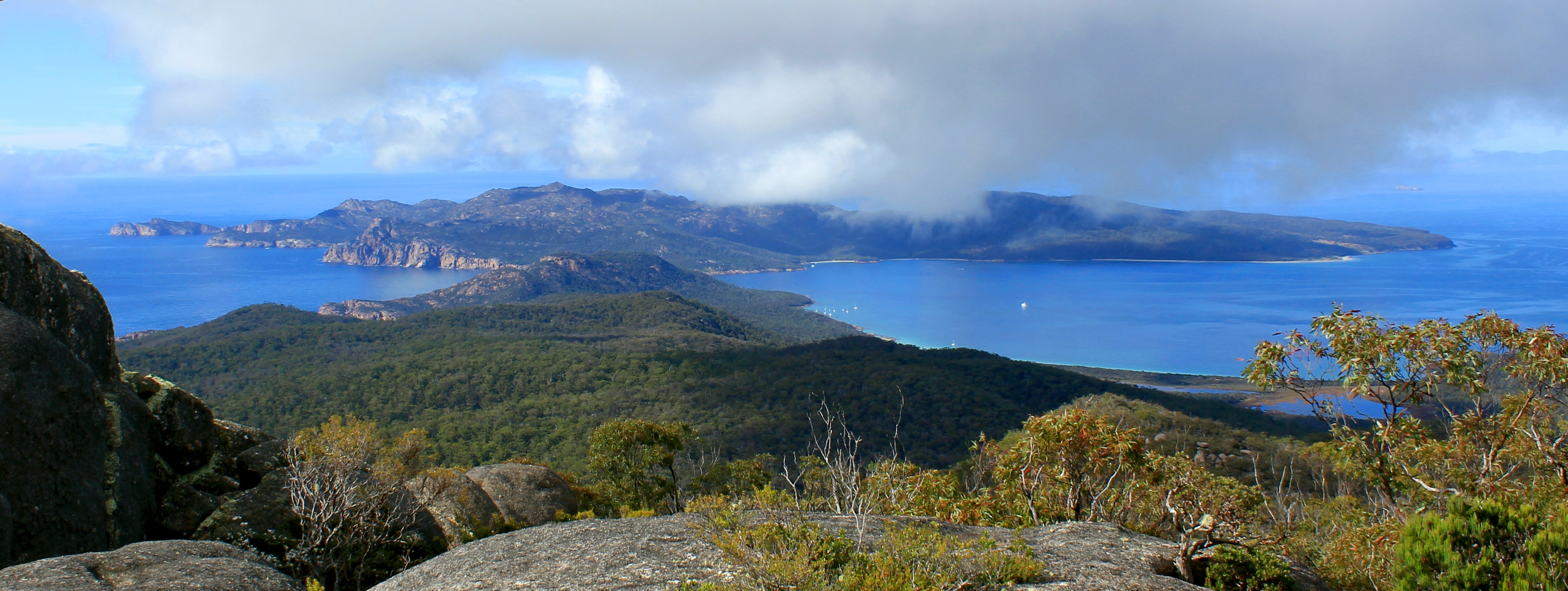
Schouten Island as viewed from the top of Mount Freycinet

Schouten is a rugged island with the highest point, Mount Storey, 400 metres (1,300 ft) above sea level. It is surrounded by cliffs, broken by sheltered bays. A north-south fault line divides the island where the eastern part of the island is composed of granite while the western part is dolerite overlying sedimentary and supergroup rocks.

== Flora and fauna ==
The natural vegetation of the island is dominated by eucalypt forest on the dolerite soils in the west, and by scrubland, heathland and sedgeland communities on the granitic soils of the east. Areas associated with previous human disturbance, such as clearing, grazing and frequent burning, are dominated by grasses and herbs.

Little penguins and short-tailed shearwaters breed on the island, along with other bird species such as the Tasmanian nativehen. Australian fur seals haul out on the eastern side. Reptiles present include the Tasmanian tree skink, she-oak skink, southern grass skink and three-lined skink.

It is largely free of pests, with no exotic rodents though rabbits are a problem with active control programs. Cats were introduced in the 1840s and went feral, but unlike other islands of Tasmania, appear to have died out as there are no indications that they are still present.

== See also ==
- Protected areas of Tasmania
- List of islands of Tasmania
