= Freycinet Peninsula =

Peninsula in Tasmania, Australia

- Peninsula
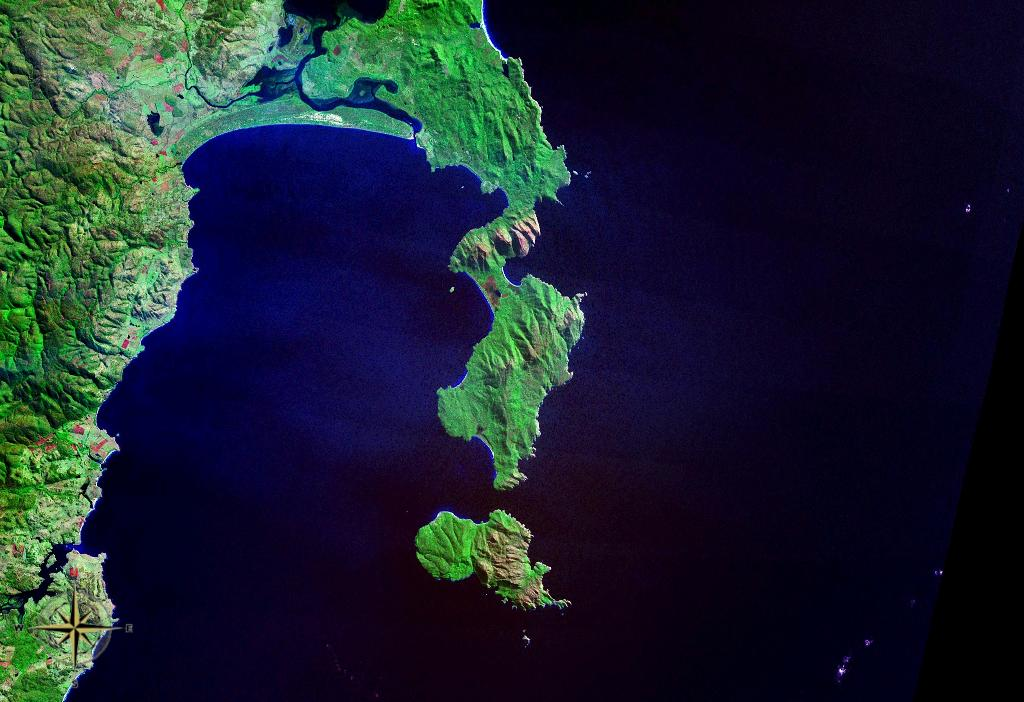
- The Freycinet Peninsula and Schouten Island, as seen from NASA space (false colour)

- Location in Tasmania
- Coordinates: 42°12′36″S 148°18′00″E
- Location: East coast Tasmania, Australia
- Designation: Freycinet National Park

The Freycinet Peninsula is a large peninsula located on the eastern coast of Tasmania, Australia. The peninsula is located north of Schouten Island and is contained within the Freycinet National Park.

The locality of Freycinet is in the local government area of Glamorgan–Spring Bay in the south-east region of Tasmania. The locality is about 110 kilometres (68 mi) north-east of the town of Swansea.

== Features and location ==
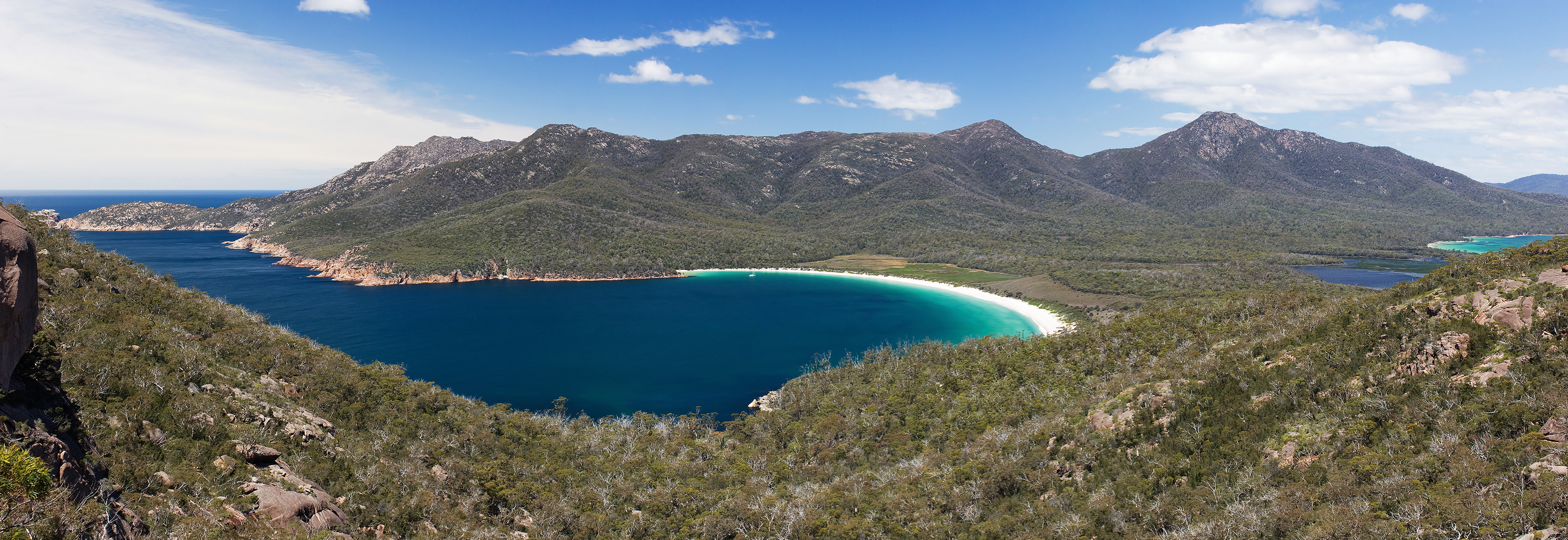
Wineglass Bay: Mount Freycinet (right) and Mount Graham (left) are visible behind

The peninsula is a large, dramatic land formation carved into Tasmania's eastern coastline. Known for its pink granite mountain range, The Hazards, and its sheltered, white sand beaches, the peninsula is the location for Freycinet National Park, the first national park to be declared in Tasmania, along with Mt Field National Park. Also on the peninsula is the village of Coles Bay, the Friendly Beaches Reserve, and Wineglass and Honeymoon bays. It covers an area of 65 square kilometres. Two sandpits connect the peninsula to the mainland. It is surrounded by Schouten Passage and Island on its southern tip and Oyster Bay on its western side.

== Early history ==
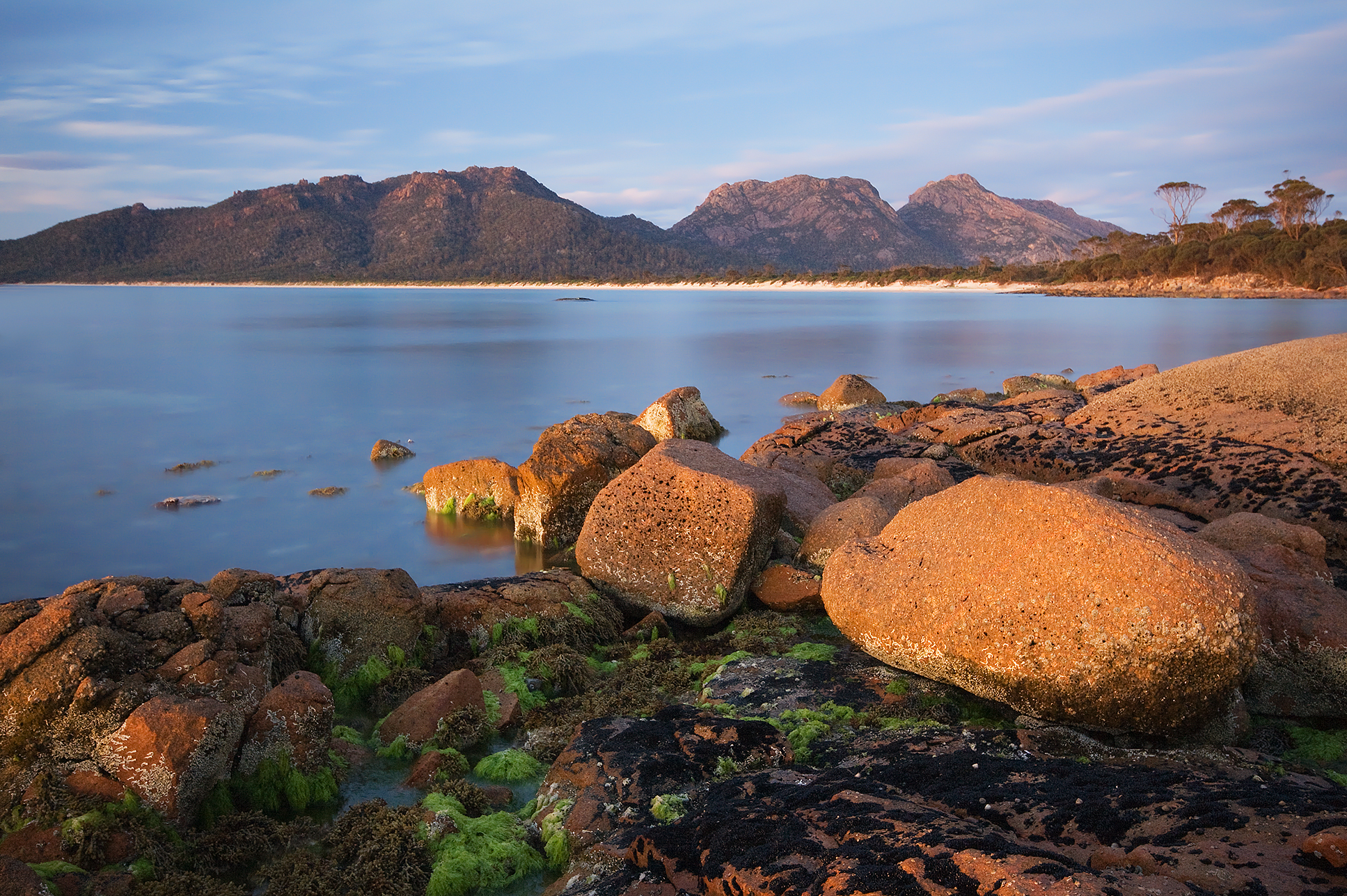
The Hazards, as seen from Hazards Beach

The "Vanderlyn Island" was the last sighting of Australia by Abel Tasman in 1642 before turning east to New Zealand.

The first landing by Europeans was by Captain Weatherhead of the transport ship Matilda on 27 July 1791. Due to the narrow northern isthmus, Weatherhead and Tasman mistook it for an island. Nicholas Baudin named the peninsula after French explorer Louis de Freycinet. Baudin also named Cape Baudin, Cape Faure, Cape Forestier and Thouin Bay, although that bay is now known as Wineglass Bay.

Shore-based bay whaling stations operated on the peninsula in the 1820s and 1830s at Wineglass Bay, Refuge Bay, Bryans Beach and Coles Bay.

== See also ==
- Protected areas of Tasmania
- List of peninsulas
