= List of rivers of Tasmania =

This is a partial list of rivers in Tasmania, Australia.

- Achilles
- Adams
- Albert
- Andrew
- Anne
- Anthony
- Apsley
- Arm
- Arthur
- Arve
- Badger
- Bird
- Black
- Blackman
- Bluff
- Blythe
- Boyd
- Boyes
- Braddon
- Break O'Day
- Broad
- Browns
- Calder
- Cam
- Carlton
- Cascade
- Clyde
- Cockle
- Collingwood
- Conder
- Cracroft
- Crayfish
- Crossing
- Cygnet
- Davey
- Dee
- Denison
- Derwent
- Detention
- De Witt
- Don
- Donaldson
- Dove
- Duck
- Dukes
- Eldon
- Elizabeth
- Emu
- Flowerdale
- Ford
- Forth
- Frankland (north-west)
- Frankland (south-west)
- Franklin
- Fury
- Gawler
- Gell
- George
- Gordon
- Governor
- Great Forester
- Harcus
- Hardwood
- Hatfield
- Heemskirk
- Hellyer
- Henty
- Hobart
- Holley
- Huon
- Huskisson
- Inglis
- Isis
- Jane
- Jordan
- Julius
- Keith
- King
- Lachlan
- Lake
- Lea
- Leven
- Liffey
- Little Denison
- Little Swanport
- Loddon
- Lora
- Lucan
- Lune
- Lyons
- Mackintosh
- Macquarie
- Marionoak
- Maurice
- Medway
- Meander
- Mersey
- Mountain
- Murchison
- Nelson
- Nile
- Nive
- North Esk
- Old
- Olga
- Orange
- Ouse
- Owen Meredith
- Paradise
- Pery
- Picton
- Pieman
- Pipers
- Plenty
- Pokana
- Princess
- Prosser
- Que
- Queen
- Rapid
- Ring
- Ringarooma
- Ringarooma (Lower)
- Rubicon
- Russell
- Salmon
- Savage
- Serpentine
- Smith
- Snake
- Solly
- Sophia
- Sorell
- South Eldon
- South Esk
- Southwell
- Spence
- Spero
- Sprent
- Stanley
- Stitt
- St Patricks
- St Pauls
- Styx
- Surprise
- Supply
- Tamar
- Tofft
- Tooms
- Tully
- Tyne
- Wallace
- Wanderer
- Wandle
- Waratah
- Wedge
- Weld
- Welcome
- Whyte
- Wilson
- Wye
- Yolande

== See also ==
- List of rivers of Australia
- Rivers of Tasmania
