= Rivers of Tasmania =

Rivers of Tasmania, Australia

This page discusses the rivers and hydrography of the state of Tasmania, Australia.

In the geography of Tasmania, the state is covered with a network of rivers and lake systems. As an island, all rivers eventually empty into the waters that surround Tasmania. There are four main river systems:

1. In the south, the Derwent flows from the Central Highlands past Hobart, to the sea at Storm Bay;
2. In the west, the Gordon River takes the waters of Lake Gordon and Lake Pedder and is joined by the Franklin River before flowing into Macquarie Harbour;
3. Flowing eastwards and to the south, the Huon River has its headwaters at Scotts Peak Dam on Lake Pedder, and reaches the sea in D'Entrecasteaux Channel; and
4. Flowing from the north-east, the South Esk, the state's longest river, joins the North Esk at Launceston to create the Tamar.

Compared to the rest of Australia, Tasmania has a very high proportion of wild or undisturbed rivers.

== Catchment areas ==
Major catchments of Tasmania are linked to the major rivers, the most notable being the Derwent. Catchments by region are:

=== South west region ===
- Gordon River

=== West coast region ===
- Arthur River
- Pieman River

== Major rivers ==
The following major rivers are the longest river systems, by length. (Note: The Coal River is approximately 80 kilometres (50 mi) long. However, it is not considered a major river by the Tasmanian Department of Primary Industries, Water and Environment.)

Longest major rivers in Tasmania by length (January 2008)
Order	River name	Length		Region(s)
Order	River name	km	mi	Region(s)
1	South Esk	252	157	Midlands
2	Derwent	215	134	Central Highlands
3	Arthur	189	117	West Coast
4	Gordon	186	116	Central Highlands; South-west; Western
5	Huon	169	105	South-west
6	Mersey	158	98	North-west
7	Franklin	129	80	Central Highlands; West Coast
8	Leven	99	62	North-west
9	North Esk	97	60	Northern
10	Pieman	38	24	West Coast

== River topography ==
=== Rivers that flow towards the Tasman Sea of the South Pacific Ocean ===
==== D'Entrecasteaux (Derwent) sub-catchment ====
- Tasman Sea
  - D'Entrecasteaux Channel
    - North West Bay
    - Browns
    - Derwent
      - Hobart
      - Jordan
      - Lachlan
      - Plenty
        - Puzzle
      - Back
      - Styx
        - Styx (South)
      - Tyenna
        - Humboldt
      - Clyde
      - Jones
      - Ouse
        - Shannon
        - James
      - Dee
        - Broad
          - Davis
      - Repluse
      - Florentine
        - Florentine (Little)
      - Nive
        - Clarence
        - Pine
          - Pine (Little)
        - Little
      - Counsel
      - Navarre
        - Navarre (Little)
      - Travellers Rest
      - Narcissus
      - Cuvier

==== D'Entrecasteaux (Huon) sub-catchment ====
- Tasman Sea
  - D'Entrecasteaux Channel
    - Carlton
    - Huon
      - Crookes Rivulet
        - Kermandie
      - Mountain
      - Little Denison
      - Russell
      - Arve
      - Weld
        - Snake
      - Picton
        - Roberts
      - Cracroft
        - Cracroft (South)
      - Anne
  - Ringarooma
    - Wyniford
    - Weld
      - Frome
    - Cascade
    - Dorset
      - New
    - Maurice
      - Maurice (South)

==== Rivers with no defined sub-catchment ====
- Tasman Sea
  - Ansons
    - Last
  - Apsley
  - Buxton
  - Catamaran
  - Coal
  - D'Entrecasteaux
  - Douglas
  - Esperance
  - George
    - Groom
      - Ransom
    - George (North)
    - George (South)
  - Lune
  - Meredith
  - North West Bay
  - Prosser
    - Sand
      - Back
    - Bluff
  - Scamander
    - Avenue
  - Snug
  - Stony
  - Swan
    - Wye
    - Cygnet
      - Brushy
    - Swan (West)
  - Swanport (Little)
  - Welcome
    - Harcus

=== Rivers that flow towards the Southern Ocean ===
==== Gordon–Franklin sub-catchment ====
- Southern Ocean
  - Gordon
    - Spence
    - Franklin
      - Jane
        - Acheron
      - Andrew
        - Wright
        - Looker
      - Loddon
        - Adelaide
        - Loddon (South)
      - Lucan
      - Collingwood
        - Patons
        - Balaclava
        - Inkerman
        - Alma
      - Surprise
    - Sprent
      - Percy
    - Olga
    - Denison
      - Maxwell
      - Firths
    - Smith
    - Orange
    - Albert
    - Serpentine
    - Adams
    - Holley
    - Pokana
    - Wedge
      - Boyd
    - Boyes
    - Gell

==== Pieman River sub-catchment ====
- Southern Ocean
  - Pieman
    - Donaldson
      - Toner
      - Donaldson (Little)
    - Whyte
      - Heazlewood
      - Rocky
      - Castray
    - Savage
      - Savage (Little)
    - Owen Meredith
    - Paradise
    - Heemskirk
    - Stanley
    - Huskisson
      - Ramsay
      - Que
        - Bulgobac
      - Coldstream
      - Hatfield
    - Stitt
    - Wilson
      - Alfred
      - Harman
      - Wilson (Little)
    - Ring
    - Marionoak
    - Murchison
      - Anthony
      - Bluff
      - Achilles
      - Wallace
    - Mackintosh
      - Sophia
        - Brougham
      - Southwell
      - Fury
      - Mackintosh
        - Vale

==== Davey River sub-catchment ====
- Southern Ocean
  - Davey
    - De Witt
    - Crossing
      - Dodds
    - Hardwood
    - Frankland (south-west)
    - Lora

==== Henty River sub-catchment ====
- Southern Ocean
  - Henty
    - Badger
    - Yolande
      - Langdon
    - Tully
      - Tully (Little)

==== King River sub-catchment ====
- Southern Ocean
  - King
    - Queen
      - Thomas Currie
        - Garfield
    - Princess
    - Nelson
    - Governor
    - Tofft
    - Eldon (South)
    - Eldon

==== Old River sub-catchment ====
- Southern Ocean
  - Old
    - Collins
    - Solly
      - Watts

==== Wanderer River sub-catchment ====
- Southern Ocean
  - Wanderer
    - Conder
      - Hales

==== Rivers with no defined sub-catchment ====
- Southern Ocean
  - Birchs
  - Bird
    - Nora
  - Braddon
  - Clark
  - Daisy
  - Dawson
  - Giblin
  - Henty (Little)
    - Dundas
  - Hibbs
  - Interview
  - Italian
  - Lagoon
  - Lewis
    - Hudson
  - Louisa
  - Mainwaring
  - Manuka
  - Modder
  - Mulcahy
  - Nelson Bay
  - New
    - Salisbury
  - Nielson
  - Pedder
    - Pedder (North)
  - North
  - Ray
  - Rocky (Little)
  - Sorell
    - Pockacker
  - Spero
    - Pery
  - Spring
  - Tasman
  - Thornton
    - McLeod
  - Urquhart
  - Wild Wave

=== Rivers that flow north, towards Bass Strait ===
==== Esk–Tamar catchment ====
- Bass Strait
  - Tamar
    - Supply
    - Esk (South)
      - Meander
        - Liffey
      - Macquarie
        - Lake
          - Lake (Upper)
        - Isis
        - Elizabeth
          - Snowy
        - Blackman
        - Tooms
      - Nile
      - St Pauls
        - Dukes
      - Break O'Day
      - Tyne
    - Esk (North)
      - St Patricks
      - Ford

==== Arthur River sub-catchment ====
- Bass Strait
  - Arthur
    - Frankland (north-west)
      - Horton
        - Grane
      - Lindsay
        - Leigh
    - Salmon
    - Julius
    - Rapid
      - Rapid (Little)
    - Lyons
    - Keith
    - Hellyer
      - Wey
      - Fossey
    - Wandle
    - Waratah
  - Blythe

==== Inglis River sub-catchment ====
- Bass Strait
  - Inglis
    - Flowerdale
      - Hebe
    - Calder
    - Jessie
    - Rattler

==== Forth River sub-catchment ====
- Bass Strait
  - Forth
    - Wilmont
      - Lea
        - Fall
      - Iris
    - Dove
      - Campbell
    - Hansons

==== Mersey River sub-catchment ====
- Bass Strait
  - Mersey
    - Dasher
      - Minnow
    - Fisher
      - Fisher (Little)
    - Arm
    - Fish

==== Cam River sub-catchment ====
- Bass Strait
  - Cam
    - Guide
    - Cam (East)
    - St Marys
      - St Josephs

==== Rivers with no defined sub-catchment ====
- Bass Strait
  - Bird
    - Bird (Little)
  - Black
    - Dip
  - Boobyalla
    - Boobyalla (Little)
  - Curries
  - Detention
    - Alarm
  - Don
  - Duck
    - Roger
  - Emu
    - Old Park
    - Pet
      - Darling
  - Forester (Great)
    - Arnon
  - Forester (Little)
  - Leven
    - Gawler
      - Gawler (East)
      - Gawler (West)
    - Medway
  - Montagu
  - Musselroe (Great)
  - Musselroe (Little)
  - Pipers
    - Second
  - Pipers (Little)
  - Rubicon
  - Tomahawk

== See also ==
- List of rivers of Tasmania
