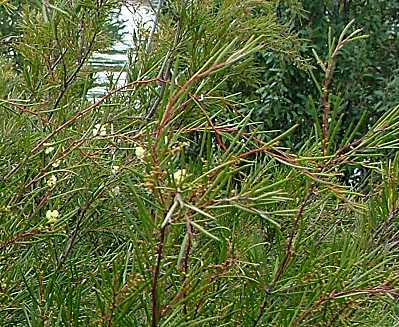

Scientific classification
- Kingdom: Plantae
- Clade: Tracheophytes
- Clade: Angiosperms
- Clade: Eudicots
- Clade: Rosids
- Order: Fabales
- Family: Fabaceae
- Subfamily: Caesalpinioideae
- Clade: Mimosoid clade
- Genus: Acacia
- Species: A. derwentiana

Binomial name
- Acacia derwentiana A.M.Gray
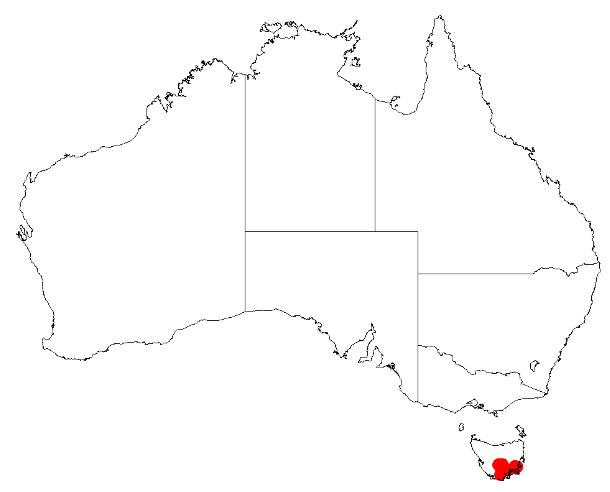
- Occurrence data from AVH

= Acacia derwentiana =

Derwent cascade

Species of legume

Acacia derwentiana, commonly known as Derwent cascade or Derwent wattle, is a species of flowering plant in the family Fabaceae and is endemic to the Tasmania, Australia. It is a shrub with slender, arching branchlets, scattered linear to very narrowly elliptic, sharply pointed phyllodes, spikes of pale yellow to lemon-yellow flowers and linear, curved pods.

== Description ==
Acacia derwentiana is a shrub that typically grows to a height of 1 to 3 m (3 ft 3 in to 9 ft 10 in), sometimes to 5 m (16 ft), and has slender branchlets that are arching or pendulous at the extremities. Its phyllodes are scattered, linear to very narrowly elliptic, mostly 20–35 mm (0.79–1.38 in) long, 1–2 mm (0.039–0.079 in) wide and sharply pointed with three veins, the lateral ones sometimes obscure. The flowers are pale yellow to almost lemon-yellow and borne on an interrupted spike 10–25 mm (0.39–0.98 in) long on a peduncle 5–8 mm (0.20–0.31 in) long. Flowering occurs from September to December, and the pods are linear, curved, irregularly constricted between the seeds, 25–35 mm (0.98–1.38 in) long and 2–4 mm (0.079–0.157 in) wide. The seeds are elliptic and dark brown with a folded aril.

== Taxonomy ==
Acacia derwentiana was first formally described in 2005 by Alan Maurice Gray in the journal Muelleria from specimens collected near the River Derwent in 2000. Derwent cascade superficially resembles A. axillaris and A. riceana but A. riceana has phyllodes crowded together in groups of 3 to 6 compared to well dispersed, more elongated phyllodes in A. derwentiana, and A. axillaris has its ultimate lateral branchlets less than 5 mm (0.20 in) long. The specific epithet (derwentiana) "is indicative of the species almost being confined to the catchment of the River Derwent in south-eastern Tasmania".

== Distribution and habitat ==
Derwent cascade is endemic to southern parts of Tasmania where it is mostly grows along the banks of the River Derwent and a few of its lower tributaries including the Broad and Tyenna Rivers. It is also found along the Carlton River and Prosser Rivers and their tributaries. to the north and east of Hobart.

== See also ==
- List of Acacia species
