= Rocky Point =

Rocky Point may refer to:

== Antarctica ==
- Rocky Point (Antarctica), Ross Island

== Australia ==
- Rocky Point, New South Wales
- Rocky Point, Queensland (Douglas Shire)
- Rocky Point, Queensland (Weipa Town)
- High Rocky Point in Tasmania
- Low Rocky Point in Tasmania
- Rocky Cape, Tasmania, a locality in Tasmania, Australia
- Rocky Cape National Park, a national park in Tasmania

== Canada ==
- Rocky Point, in Metchosin, Greater Victoria, British Columbia
- Rocky Point, Prince Edward Island
- Rocky Point Park, in Port Moody, British Columbia

== Jamaica ==
- Rocky Point, Jamaica

== Mexico ==
- Puerto Peñasco, Sonora, a beach resort which erroneously translates as Rocky Point in English

== South Africa ==
- Rocky Point, South Africa

== United States ==
- Rocky Point, California (disambiguation), several places
- Rocky Point (Tampa), a neighborhood within the city of Tampa, Florida
- Rocky Point (Massachusetts), a peninsula in Plymouth, Massachusetts
- Rocky Point, Montana
- Rocky Point, Montana (ghost town)
- Olive, Montana, also called Rocky Point
- Rocky Point, New York
- Rocky Point, North Carolina
- Rocky Point, Oregon
- Rocky Point, Cowlitz County, Washington
- Rocky Point, Kitsap County, Washington
- Rocky Point Amusement Park, a former amusement park in Warwick, Rhode Island
- Rocky Point State Park, a state park in Warwick, Rhode Island
- Rocky Point Park and Beach, a state park in Essex, Maryland
