= Rock Point =

Rock Point may refer to:

Places

In the United States:

- Rock Point, Arizona
- Rock Point, Maryland
- Rock Point, Oregon

Other

- Low Rock Point, a point forming the west side of the entrance to Church Bay, near the west end of the north coast of South Georgia
- Big Rock Point Nuclear Power Plant, was a nuclear power plant near Charlevoix, Michigan
- Rock Point Community School, a school in Rock Point, Arizona
- Rock Point Provincial Park, a park located on the north shore of Lake Erie near the mouth of the Grand River in the Carolinian zone of southwestern Ontario
- Rock Point School, a school in Burlington, Vermont
- Rock Point Gift & Stationery, an imprint of The Quarto Group

== See also ==
- Rocky Point (disambiguation)
