= High Rocky Point =

Point in Tasmania, Australia

- Headland
- Location within Tasmania
- Coordinates: 42°46′12″S 145°22′48″E
- Location: South West Tasmania

UNESCO World Heritage Site
- Official name: Tasmanian Wilderness
- Location: Oceania
- Criteria: iii, iv, vi, vii, viii, ix, x
- Reference: 181
- Inscription: 1982 (6th Session)

The High Rocky Point is a coastal landmark, located on the south western coast of Tasmania, Australia. The point, contained within the Southwest National Park, part of the Tasmanian Wilderness World Heritage Site, lies to the south of Point Hibbs and north of Low Rocky Point that is located approximately 20 kilometres (12 mi) away. The Wanderer River is located to the north of the point.

It is in an isolated and generally inaccessible area, however at different times mineral finds have occurred nearby. The point is a location on the west coast walking track between Cape Sorell and Port Davey, with High Rocky Point being in an area of thick almost impassable scrub.

The area surrounding the point has recorded former aboriginal sites of historical significance.

The name is closely related to Rocky Point and Low Rocky Point, creating some historical confusion.

== See also ==
- Geology of Tasmania
