= Spero River =

River in Tasmania, Australia

Spero
- Location of the Spero River mouth in Tasmania

Location
- Country: Australia
- State: Tasmania
- Region: West Coast, South West

Physical characteristics
- Source
  - location: below Thirkell Hill
  - coordinates: 42°40′35″S 145°34′1″E
  - elevation: 291 m (955 ft)
- Mouth: Spero Bay, Southern Ocean
  - location: Point Hibbs
  - coordinates: 42°38′10″S 145°19′58″E
  - elevation: 0 m (0 ft)
- Length: 29 km (18 mi)

Basin features
- Tributaries
  - left: Pery River
- Reservoir: Lake Burbury

The Spero River is a perennial river in the West Coast or South West region of Tasmania, Australia.

== Course and features ==
The Spero River rises below Thirkell Hill on an unnamed range within the Southwest Conservation Area. The river flows generally north by west, joined by the Pery River and one minor tributary before reaching its mouth and emptying into Spero Bay, south east of Point Hibbs, eventually flowing into the Southern Ocean. The river descends 287 metres (942 ft) over its 29-kilometre (18 mi) course.

The river mouth is located on a walking track entitled the Hibbs Lagoon to Low Rocky Point, approximately 58 kilometres (36 mi), 12-days plus, along the south western coast of Tasmania that is considered the most difficult section of the coast. The mouth area has also been subjected to both plans and actual modification of reefs and blockages for navigation of the lower portion of the river. Access to the area in the 1930s was also augmented by tracks from Birchs Inlet on Macquarie Harbour.

Much of the course of the river is isolated with very limited direct contact with the outside world, however a Huon pine timber venture in the 1930s and 1940s saw some level of activity in the area.

A small steam ship the SS Gundiah was specifically bought to service the Spero River timber industry.

The river name is also applied to the cartographic material available from Tasmap for the area.

== See also ==
- Rivers of Tasmania
