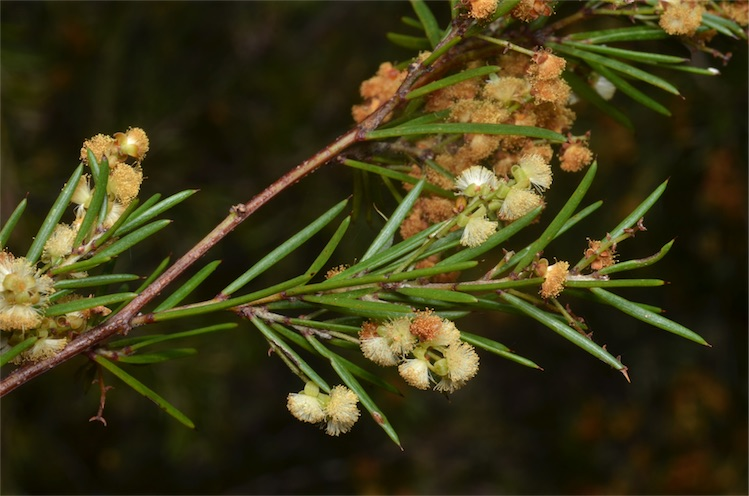
- In the Tasmanian Bushland Garden

Conservation status
- Vulnerable (EPBC Act)

Scientific classification
- Kingdom: Plantae
- Clade: Tracheophytes
- Clade: Angiosperms
- Clade: Eudicots
- Clade: Rosids
- Order: Fabales
- Family: Fabaceae
- Subfamily: Caesalpinioideae
- Clade: Mimosoid clade
- Genus: Acacia
- Species: A. axillaris

Binomial name
- Acacia axillaris Benth.
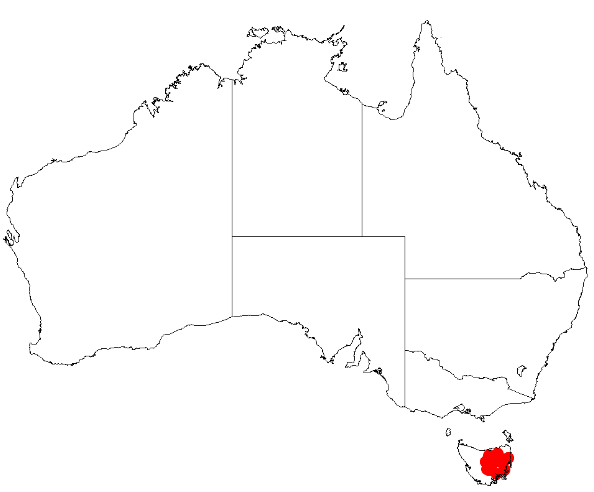
- Occurrence data from AVH

= Acacia axillaris =

Species of legume

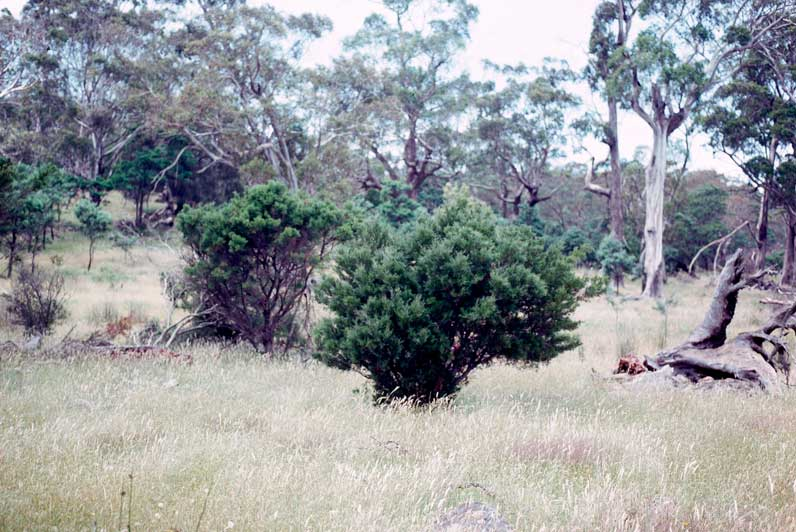
Habit near Campbell Town

Acacia axillaris, commonly known as midlands mimosa or midlands wattle, is a species of flowering plant in the family Fabaceae and is endemic to Tasmania. It is an erect or spreading shrub with many branches, linear, sharply-pointed phyllodes, small clusters of pale yellow flowers, and almost cylindrical pods up to 80 mm (3.1 in) long.

== Description ==
Acacia axillaris is a many-branched shrub that typically grows to a height of 2–4 m (6 ft 7 in – 13 ft 1 in) and has an erect or spreading habit. Its phyllodes are linear, flat and sharply-pointed, mostly 10–55 mm (0.39–2.17 in) long and 1.0–1.8 mm (0.039–0.071 in) wide. There are stipules less than 1.2 mm (0.047 in) long at the base of the phyllodes. The phyllodes are usually thick and rigid and have often have three veins on each face with one more prominent than the others. The flowers are pale yellow, honey-perfumed, and arranged in a cluster of two to six less than 6 mm (0.24 in) long, on a peduncle 1.5–2 mm (0.059–0.079 in) long. It flowers between September and October. The pods appear in February and are almost cylindrical, 20–80 mm (0.79–3.15 in) long and 2.0–3.5 mm (0.079–0.138 in) wide, containing elliptical to cylindrically shaped seeds 4.0–4.5 mm (0.16–0.18 in) long with a prominent aril.

== Taxonomy ==
Acacia axillaris was first formally described in 1842 by George Bentham in Hooker's London Journal of Botany, from specimens collected by Ronald Campbell Gunn. The specific epithet (axillaris) means 'axillary'.

== Distribution and habitat ==
Midlands wattle is mostly situated in the agricultural area in lowland pastures of the Midlands, in north eastern Central Tasmania and also on Mount Barrow in the subalpine zone of north eastern Tasmania. It is distributed through five localities; Mount Barrow and within the Elizabeth, St Paul, Dukes and Lake River catchment areas and Lake Leake Road. A total population of approximately 45,000 individuals is known across 18 populations.

== Conservation status ==
Acacia axillaris is listed as "vulnerable" under the Australian Government Environment Protection and Biodiversity Conservation Act 1999 and the Tasmanian Government Threatened Species Protection Act 1995.

== See also ==
- List of Acacia species
