= Red Bridge (Tasmania) =

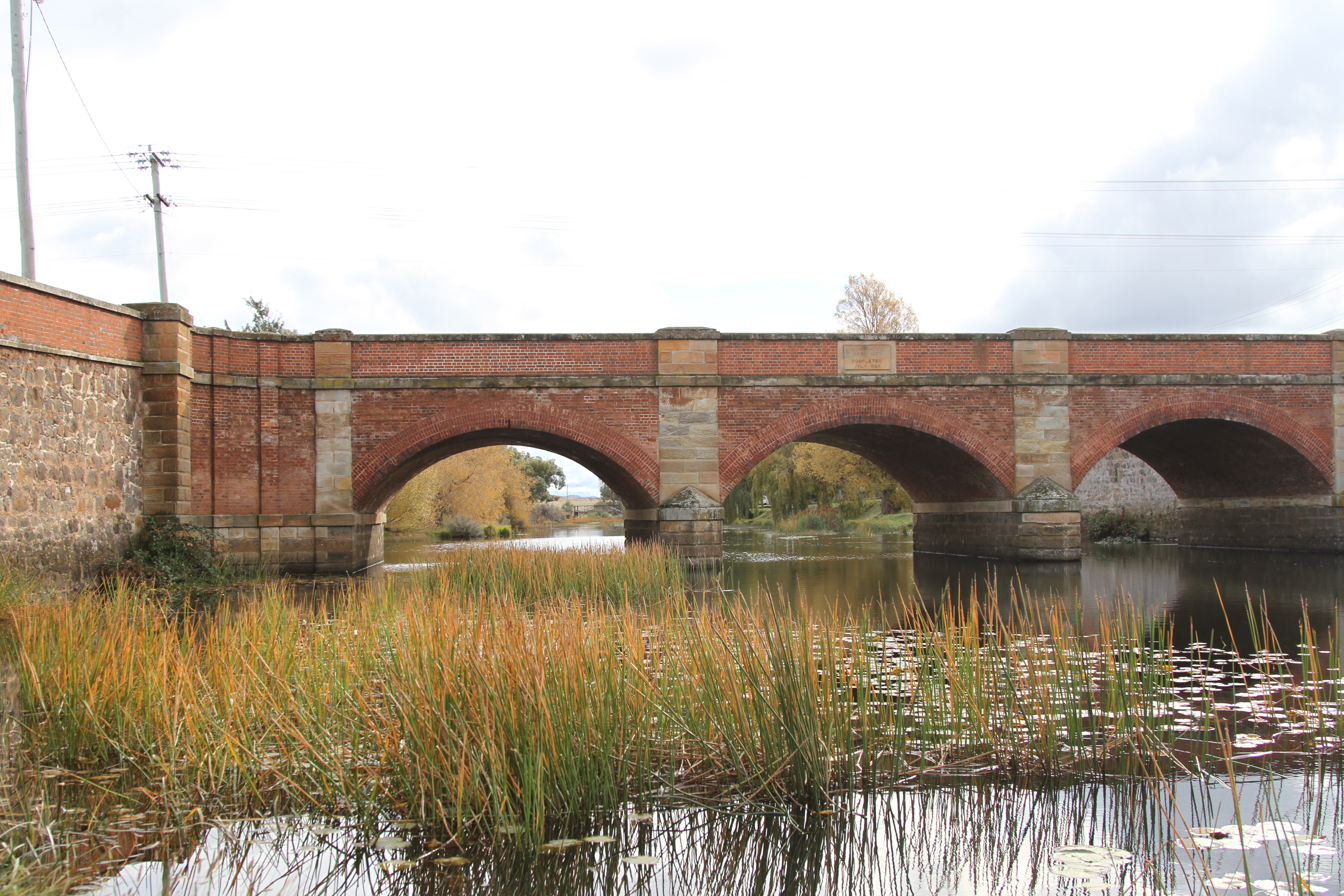
- Red Bridge, Tasmania
- Coordinates: 41°55′58″S 147°29′34″E
- Carries: Motor vehicles and Pedestrians
- Crosses: Elizabeth River
- Locale: Campbell Town, Tasmania, Australia
- Heritage status: Registered

Characteristics
- Design: Arch bridge
- Material: Brick and Stone
- Longest span: 7.6 metres (25 ft)
- No. of spans: 3

History
- Designer: James Blackburn
- Construction start: 1836
- Construction end: July 1838

The Red Bridge in Tasmania crosses the Elizabeth River at Campbell Town. Built in 1838 using penal labour, it is the oldest surviving brick arch bridge in Australia, as well as the oldest bridge anywhere on the National Highway. The bridge contains three arch spans of 7.6 m (25 ft) each and holds two lanes of traffic as well as pedestrian walkways. It lies on the Midland Highway, roughly halfway between Hobart and Launceston, carrying over two million vehicles per year.

It is said to have been designed by James Blackburn, architect to Melbourne and a convict himself. It was constructed of 1,250,000 handmade bricks on dry land, and after its completion the river was diverted to flow under the bridge.

The Red Bridge is registered on the Register of the National Estate since 1978.

The bridge received an Engineering Heritage National Marker from Engineers Australia as part of its Engineering Heritage Recognition Program.
