= Nelson Falls =

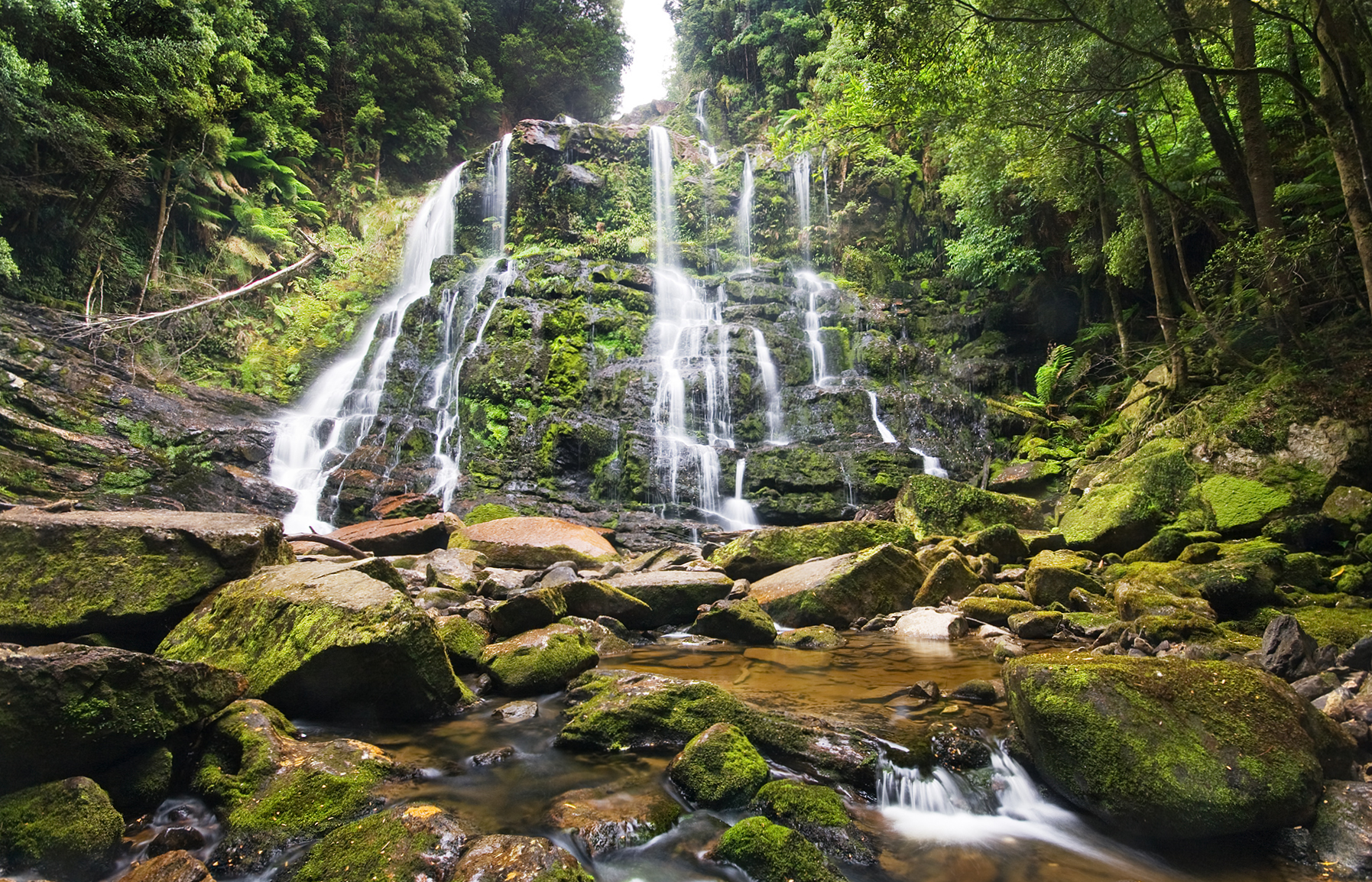
- Nelson Falls

- Location within Tasmania
- Location: West Coast, Tasmania, Australia
- Coordinates: 42°05′24″S 145°43′48″E
- Type: Cascade
- Total height: 30 metres (98 ft)

The Nelson Falls, a cascade waterfall, is located in the UNESCO World Heritage–listed Tasmanian Wilderness, in the West Coast region of Tasmania, Australia.

== Location and features ==
The Nelson Falls are situated in the Franklin-Gordon Wild Rivers National Park, accessible from Queenstown, located 27 kilometres (17 mi) to the west, via the Lyell Highway through the Nelson Valley. The falls (on the Nelson River, which flows into Lake Burbury) descend approximately 30 metres (98 ft).

== See also ==
- List of waterfalls
- List of waterfalls in Australia
- Media related to Nelson Falls at Wikimedia Commons
