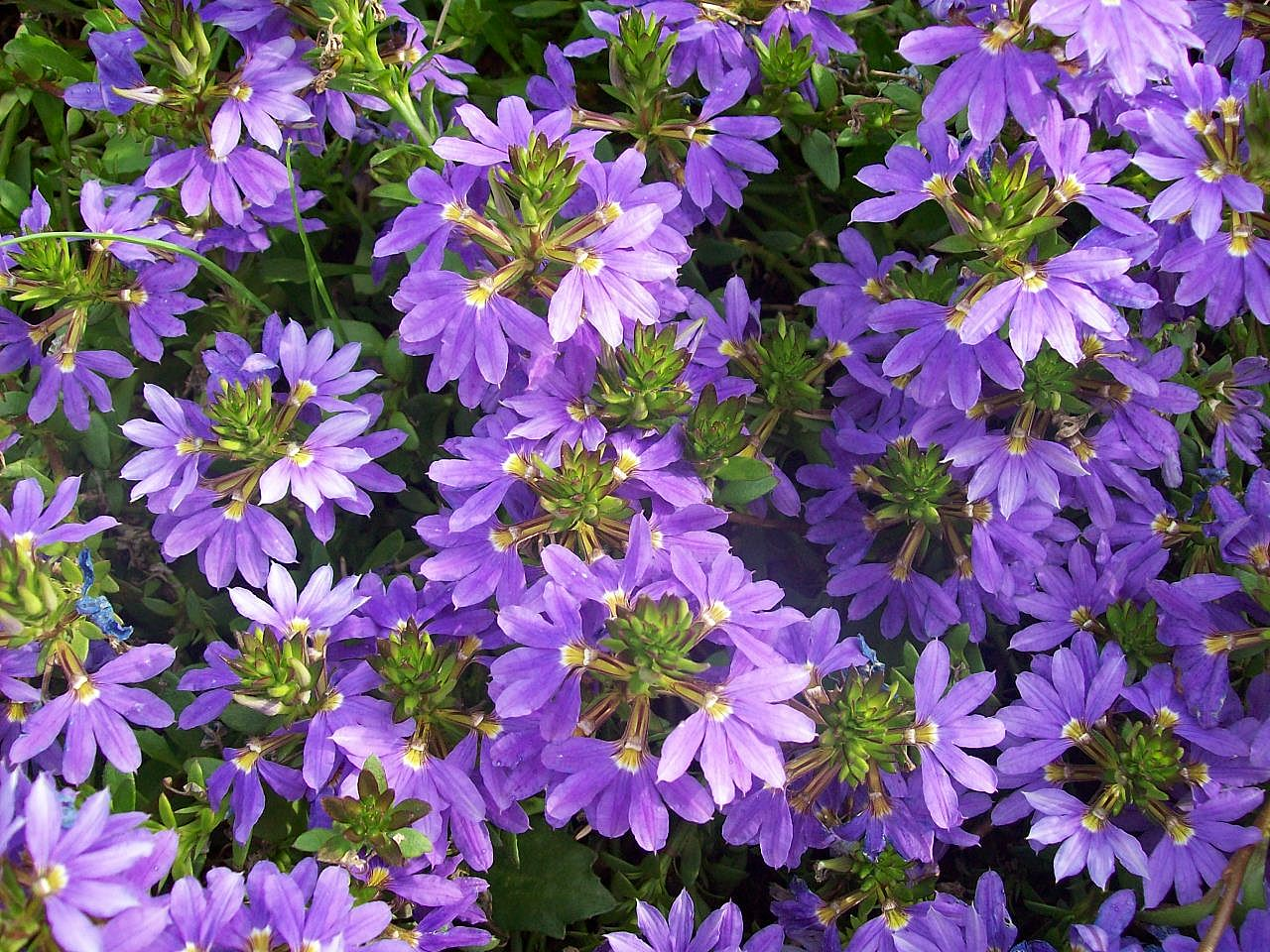
- Scaevola aemula cultivated in Heidelberg Botanic Garden

Scientific classification
- Kingdom: Plantae
- Clade: Tracheophytes
- Clade: Angiosperms
- Clade: Eudicots
- Clade: Asterids
- Order: Asterales
- Family: Goodeniaceae
- Genus: Scaevola
- Species: S. aemula

Binomial name
- Scaevola aemula R.Br.
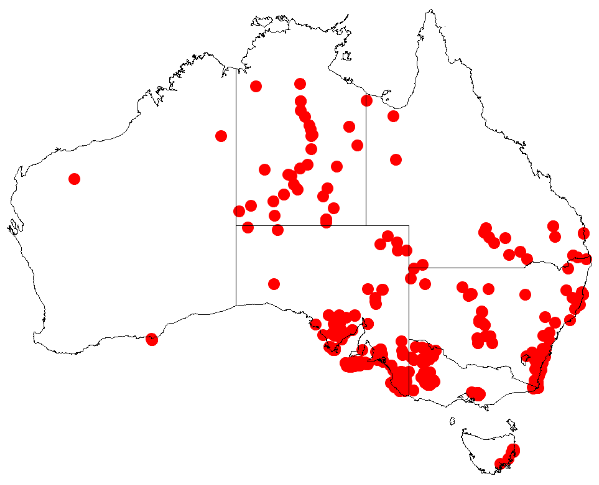
- Occurrence data from AVH

Synonyms
- Lobelia aemula (R.Br.) Kuntze; Merkusia sinuata (R.Br.) de Vriese; Scaevola sinuata R.Br

= Scaevola aemula =

Fairy fan-flower

Species of plant

Scaevola aemula, commonly known as the fairy fan-flower or common fan-flower, is a species of flowering plant in the family Goodeniaceae. It has mostly egg-shaped leaves and blue, mauve or white fan-shaped flowers. It grows in New South Wales, South Australia, Victoria and Western Australia.

== Description ==
Scaevola aemula is a mat-forming, perennial herb that grows up to 50 cm high with brown, coarsely hairy, terete stems. The leaves are elliptic to egg-shaped tapering near the base, sessile, edges toothed, up to 10–88 mm (0.39–3.46 in) long and 4–31 mm (0.16–1.22 in) wide, decreasing in size near the flowers. The fan-shaped flowers are white, blue or mauve with a yellow centre are borne on spikes up to 24 cm (9.4 in) long, corolla 17–25 mm (0.67–0.98 in) long, flattened hairs on the outside and bearded inside and the wings 1–1.5 mm (0.039–0.059 in) wide. The bracts are small, leaf-like, bracteoles lance-shaped and 4.5–7 mm (0.18–0.28 in) long. Flowering occurs mostly from August to October and the fruit are a rounded, wrinkled drupe to 4.5 mm long and covered in soft, short hairs.

== Taxonomy and naming ==
Scaevola aemula was first formally described in 1810 by Robert Brown and the description was published in Prodromus Florae Novae Hollandiae. The specific epithet (aemula) means "striving after".

== Distribution and habitat ==
Fairy fan-flower grows in dry sclerophyll forest mostly on sandy soils from the Eyre Peninsula in South Australia, through Victoria to Mount Warning in New South Wales and in the Esperance Plains bioregion of Western Australia. It also occurs in the Great Oyster Bay region between the Prosser River and Apsley River in Tasmania.

== Conservation status ==
Scaevola aemula is listed as "endangered" under the Tasmanian Government Threatened Species Protection Act 1995.

== Use in horticulture ==
The species is thought to be the most commonly cultivated of the genus Scaevola, and a large number of cultivars have been developed. Most of these are mat-forming to a height of 12 cm and spreading up to 1 metre in width. It prefers a sunny or partially shaded, well-drained position and tolerates salt spray and periods of drought. Pruning and pinching of tip growth may be carried out to shape the plant. Propagation is from cuttings or by layering.
