= Victoria Bridge, Launceston =

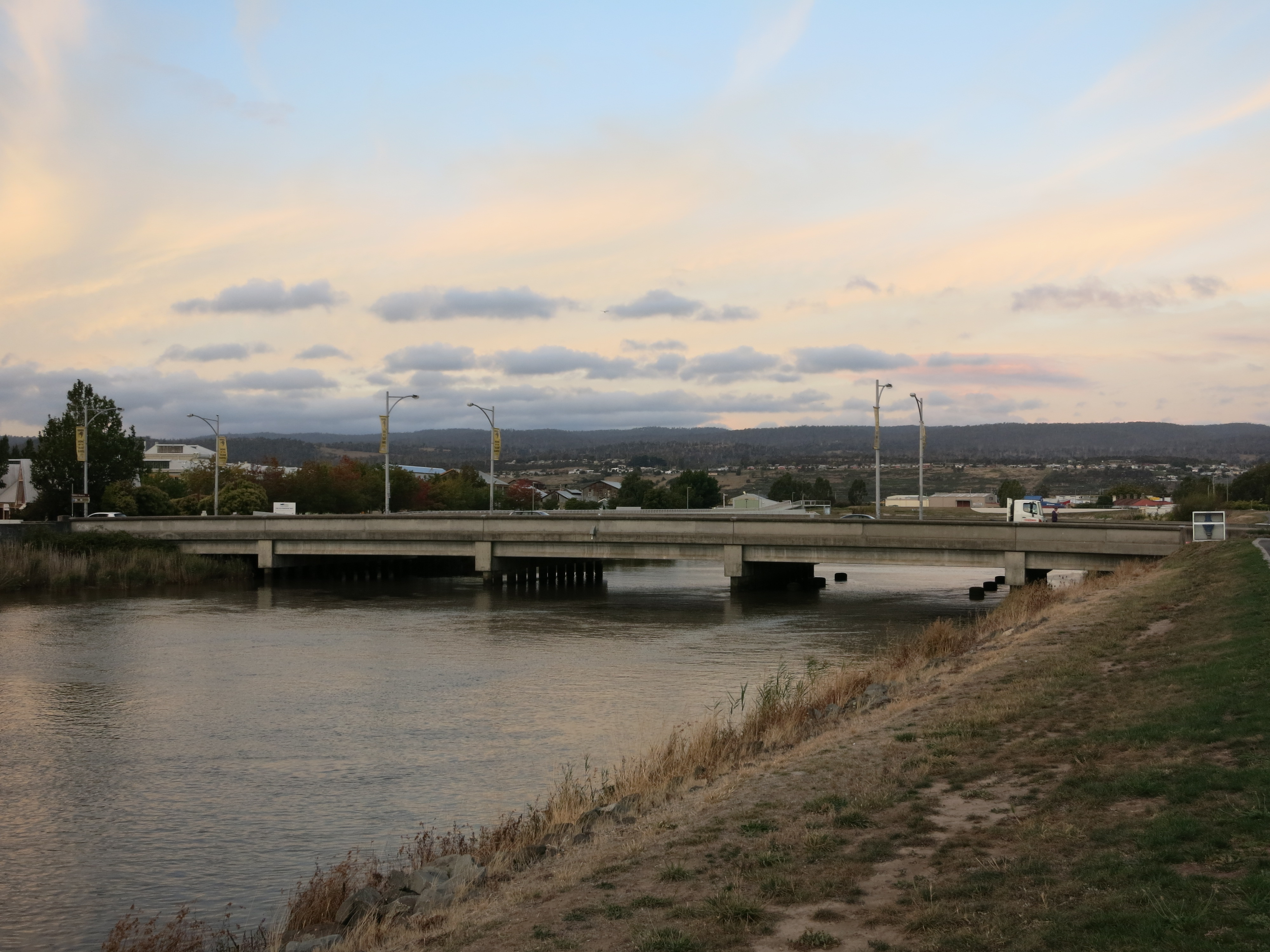
- Victoria Bridge in March 2015
- Coordinates: 41.4308°S 147.1391°E
- Carries: Tamar Street
- Crosses: North Esk River
- Locale: Launceston, Tasmania
- Owner: Building Tasmania

Characteristics
- No. of lanes: 4

History
- Constructed by: Public Works Department
- Opened: 31 July 1966

Location
- Interactive map of Victoria Bridge, Launceston

The Victoria Bridge in Launceston, Tasmania, Australia carries Tamar Street across the North Esk River.

Also known as the Tamar Street Bridge, the original 500 feet timber bridge opened on 10 January 1899. With the ironwork and bridge piling deteriorating, it closed on 27 September 1965. A replacement concrete bridge was built by the Public Works Department, opening on 31 July 1966.
