= Scamander River, Tasmania =

River in north-east Tasmania

Scamander River
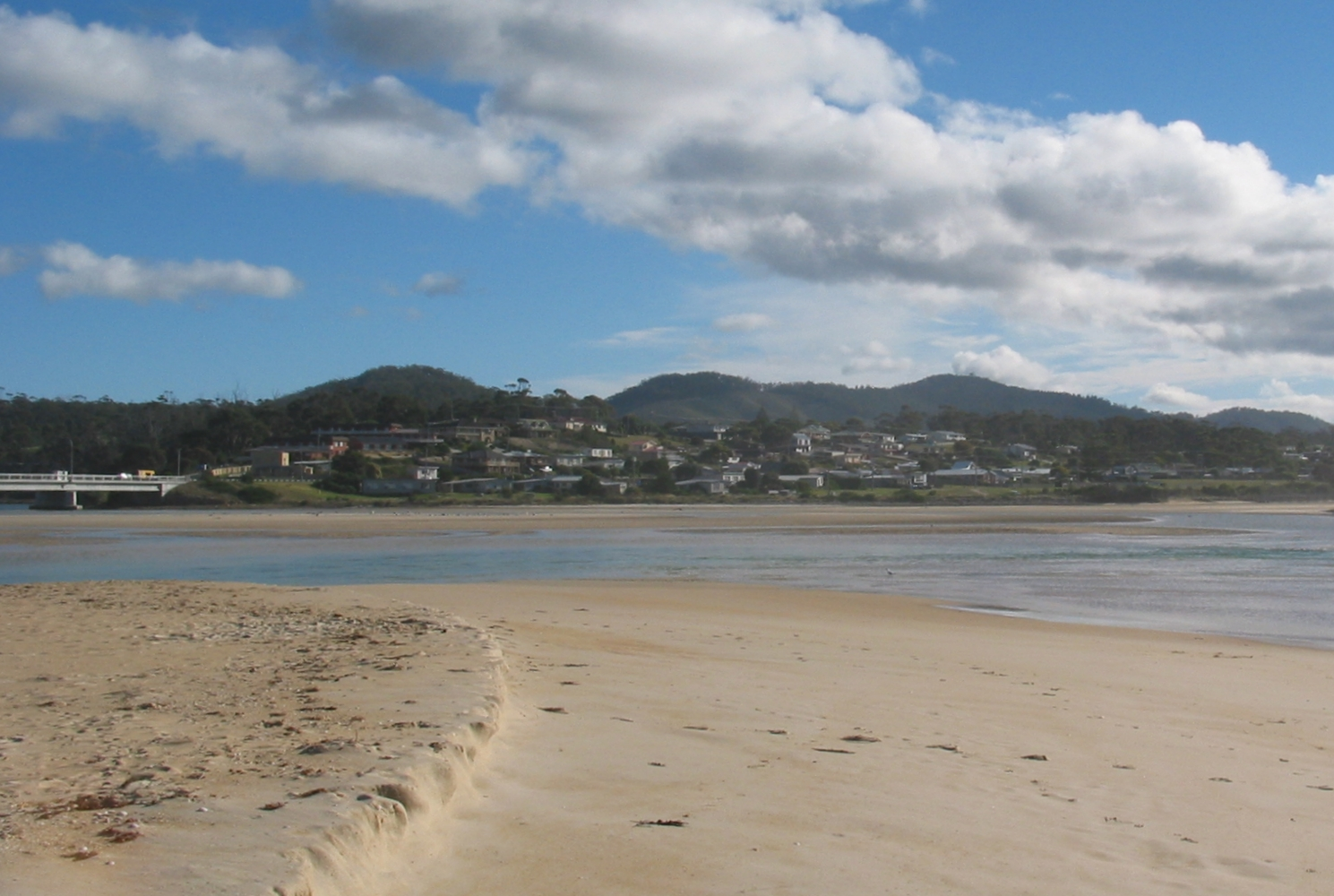
- The Scamander River at Scamander

- Location within Tasmania

Location
- Country: Australia
- State: Tasmania
- Region: North-east
- Settlements: Scamander, Pyengana, and Mathinna

Physical characteristics
- Mouth: Tasman Sea
  - location: Scamander
- Length: 34 km (21 mi)

The Scamander River is a river in the north east of Tasmania.

== Locations ==
The Scamander River starts from the mouth of the Tasman Sea which then goes under the Scamander River Bridge. For most of the entire river, it is surrounded by trees and bushes but meets the rural locality called Upper Scamander. The river ends by itself.

== See also ==
- Rivers of Tasmania
