= Arve River (Tasmania) =

River in Tasmania, Australia

Arve
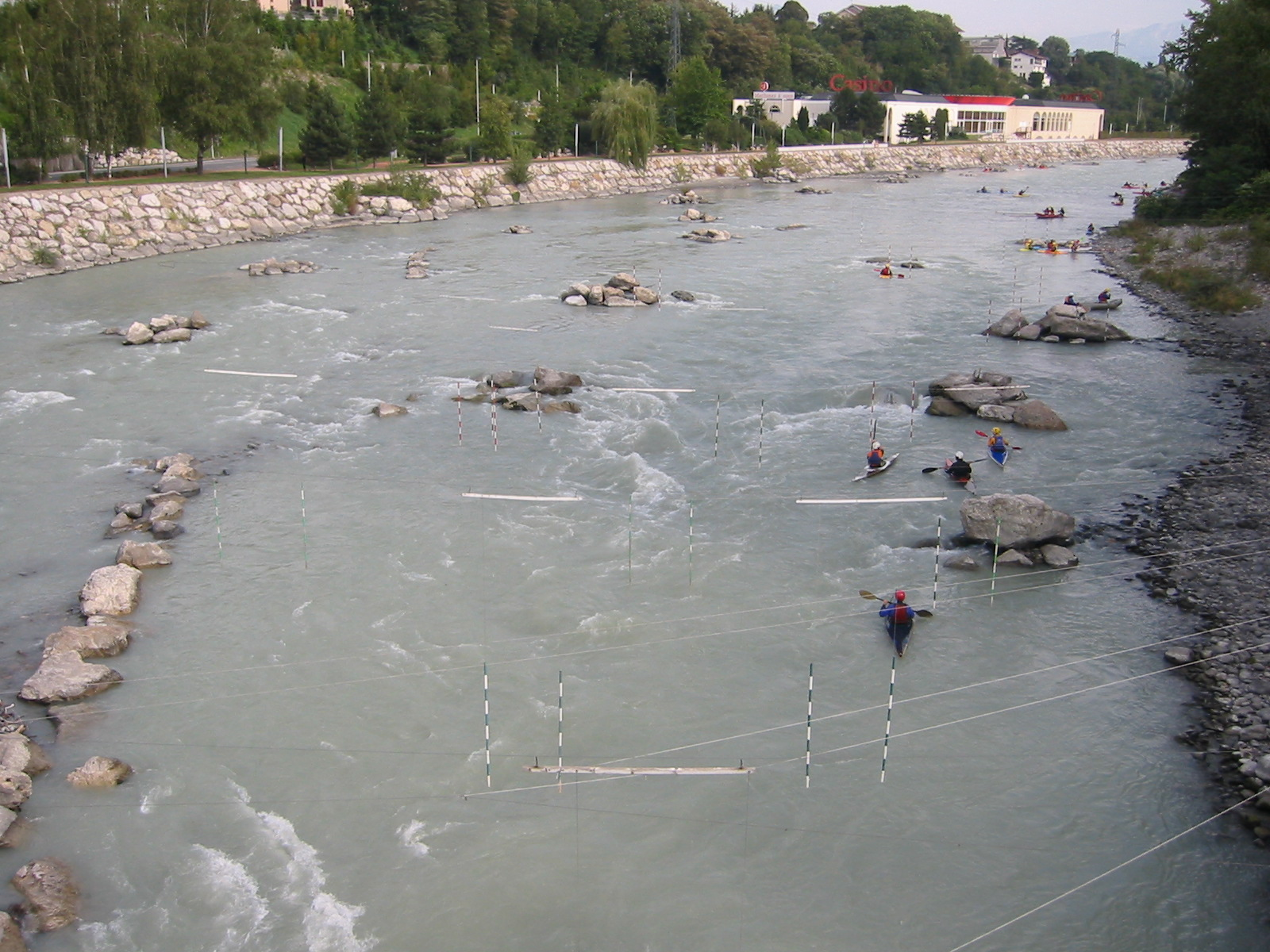

- Location of mouth of the Anne River in Tasmania

Location
- Country: Australia
- State: Tasmania
- Region: South East

Physical characteristics
- Source: Hartz Mountains
  - location: below Devils Backbone
  - coordinates: 43°13′6″S 146°48′13″E
  - elevation: 917 m (3,009 ft)
- Mouth: Huon River
  - coordinates: 43°02′03″S 146°50′35″E
  - elevation: 43 m (141 ft)
- Length: 23 km (14 mi)

Basin features
- River system: Huon River catchment
- National park: Hartz Mountains National Park

The Arve River is a river in the southeast region of Tasmania, Australia.

The river rises below Devils Backbone in the Hartz Mountains and flows generally north towards the Arve Plains. It reaches its confluence with the Huon River west of Huonville. The river descends 874 metres (2,867 ft) over its 23-kilometre (14 mi) course.

== See also ==
- List of rivers of Tasmania
