= Low Rocky Point =

Point in Tasmania, Australia

- Headland
- Location within Tasmania
- Coordinates: 42°59′24″S 145°29′24″E
- Location: South West Tasmania

UNESCO World Heritage Site
- Official name: Tasmanian Wilderness
- Location: Oceania
- Criteria: iii, iv, vi, vii, viii, ix, x
- Reference: 181
- Inscription: 1982 (6th Session)

The Low Rocky Point is a location on the south west coast of Tasmania and Australia, that is used as a location for weather forecasting. It is almost due west of Hobart, it is south of Point Hibbs and north of South West Cape.

== Location and features ==
An application was made to establish a shore-based bay whaling station in the area in the 19th century. It is not clear if any whaling actually took place there.

Wrecks and other events in the region use the location as a reference point.

In the early twentieth century, the need for a light was canvassed.

It is also an important reference point for nautical maps.

To the south east and east of the point is Elliott Bay. North of the point is the Lewis River, and the next headland south is Elliot Point approximately 20 kilometres (12 mi) south east. High Rocky Point lies less than 20 kilometres (12 mi) to the north.

It is also a location on the west coast walking track between Cape Sorell and Port Davey.

== Climate ==
Climate data for Low Rocky Point, 1994–2022
Month	Jan	Feb	Mar	Apr	May	Jun	Jul	Aug	Sep	Oct	Nov	Dec	Year
Average rainfall mm (inches)	76.1 (3.00)	73.6 (2.90)	90.8 (3.57)	106.5 (4.19)	142.3 (5.60)	128.7 (5.07)	150.5 (5.93)	150.1 (5.91)	127.6 (5.02)	113.4 (4.46)	81.4 (3.20)	88.9 (3.50)	1,340.4 (52.77)
Source: Bureau of Meteorology (Climate Data Online);

== See also ==
- Sandy Cape
