= Flood Plain Lower Ringarooma River wetlands =

Flood Plain Lower Ringarooma River wetland
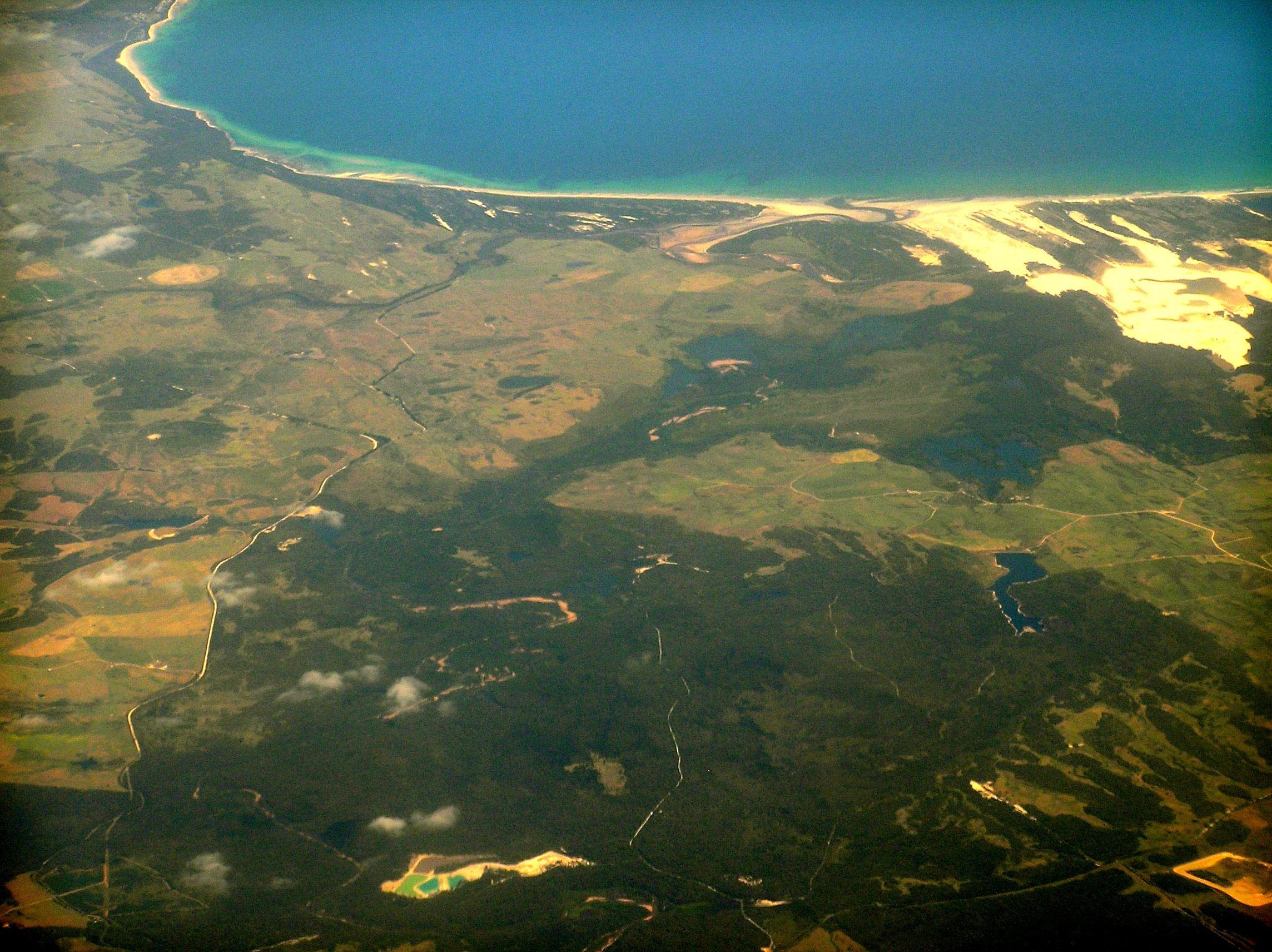
- Aerial view, with the Ringarooma River floodplain on the upper right

- Location within Tasmania
- Location: Tasmania
- Coordinates: 40°54′S 147°56′E
- Area: 3,519 km^{2} (1,359 sq mi)
- Established: 16 November 1982

Ramsar Wetland
- Official name: Flood Plain Lower Ringarooma River
- Designated: 16 November 1982
- Reference no.: 257

The Flood Plain Lower Ringarooma River wetlands is a wetland site comprises the floodplain of the lower Ringarooma River in north-eastern Tasmania, Australia. In 1982 it was designated a wetland of international importance under the Ramsar Convention.

== Description ==
The Ramsar site has an area of 3,519 hectares (8,700 acres). It lies between the towns of Tomahawk to the west and Gladstone to the south-east. It is a sandy floodplain, flat and low-lying, with an elevation of less than 20 metres (66 ft) above sea level. Geologically, it consists of Quaternary clays, sands and gravels with silty clay soil overlying deep grey sands. The silt is derived from erosion in the river catchment caused by tin mining. The average annual rainfall is 625–750 mm.

=== Flora and fauna ===
The site is vegetated with shrubland and tussock grassland and surrounded by woodland. Several plants that are rare or threatened in Tasmania, including Centipeda minima, Polygonum strigosum, Lythrum salicaria and Villarsia exaltata, occur there. It also provides secure feeding and nesting habitat for many waterbirds. The area is used for livestock grazing as well as regulated waterfowl hunting.
