= North Esk River =

River in northern Tasmania, Australia

North Esk
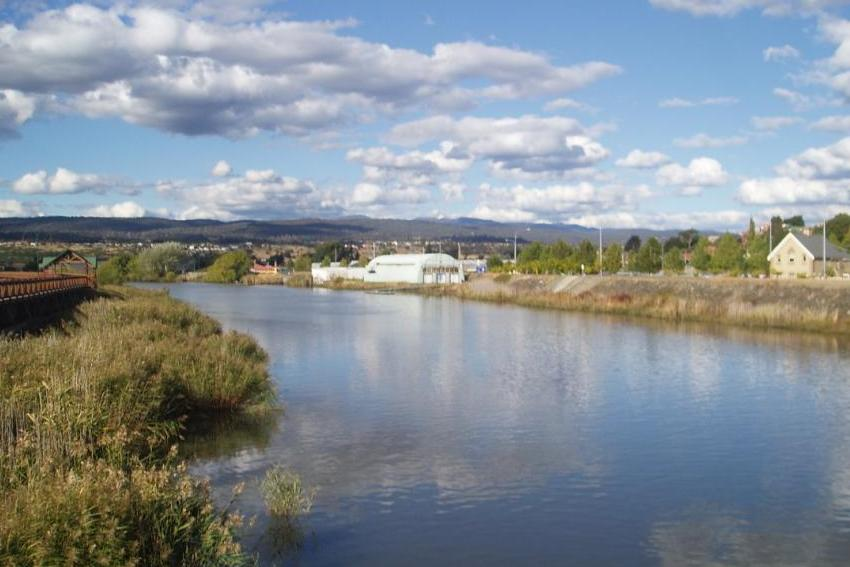
- North Esk River from Victoria Bridge, Launceston

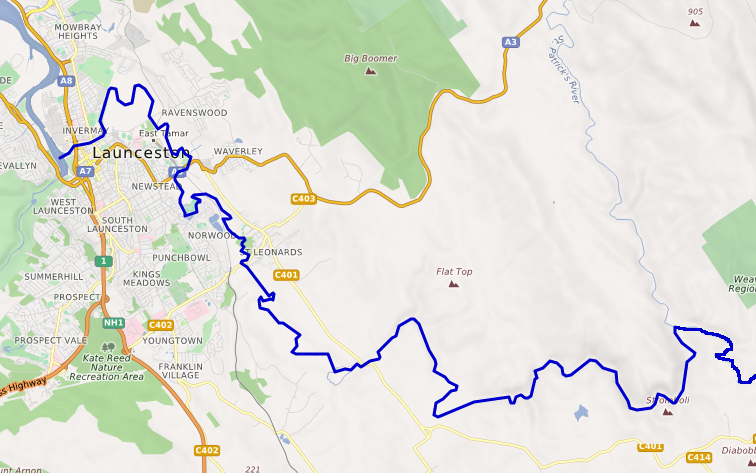
- Course of the North Esk River.
- Native name: lakekeller; mangana

Location
- Country: Australia
- State: Tasmania
- Region: Northern Tasmania

Physical characteristics
- Source: Ben Nevis
  - location: Northallerton Valley
  - elevation: 547 m (1,795 ft)
- Mouth: South Esk River
  - location: Launceston
  - coordinates: 41°43′16″S 147°13′06″E
  - elevation: 0 m (0 ft)
- Length: 86 km (53 mi)

Basin features
- River system: South Esk River
- Tributaries
  - left: Ford River
  - right: St Patricks River

The North Esk River is a major perennial river located in the northern region of Tasmania, Australia.

== Location and features ==
It is one of the tributaries of the Tamar River together with the South Esk River. It starts in the Northallerton Valley below Ben Nevis in the states North East, joining with the St Patricks River before flowing through Launceston. Launceston's Old Seaport tourist feature is located on the North Esk River. The river becomes tidal downstream of Hoblers Bridge to where it meets the Tamar. It is sometimes subject to flooding, especially in East Launceston suburbs.

The largest tributary of the North Esk is the St Patricks River, with others including the Ford River which flows down from the ski-fields of mount Ben Lomond, and down stream of the Corra Linn Gorge, the Roses Rivulet and Distillery Creek.

== History ==
=== Indigenous history ===
The North Esk River forms part of the traditional lands of the Tasmanian Aborigines. The upper reaches of the river, and its watershed, is country belonging to the Ben Lomond Nation and the lower reaches, near Launceston is the country of the Leterremairrener clan of the North Midlands Nation. The Tasmanian Aboriginal names for the North Esk River are lakekeller (with the suffix kila meaning deep) and mangana, which simply means river. An unnamed Colonial explorer in 1831 described the land up the North Esk River as open country but surrounded by densely wooded hills. The open country had been used by colonials early in Launceston's history as a source of kangaroo meat for the nascent colony and was known as 'Bullock's Hunting Ground'. It is likely that this country had been kept open by Aboriginal firestick farming techniques prior to settlement and was the traditional hunting ground of either the Letterremairrener or a clan of the Ben Lomond Nation.

Paterson's Plains, in what is now St Leonards to Relbia, was described as a meeting place of Indigenous people but whether this was because traditional country in Launceston was occupied is not known.

=== European history ===
The North Esk river area has a forgotten history inside Launceston's cultural memory. The East and West banks were once swarming with Bushrangers and Aboriginal tribes which would continuously attack the settlers of this area. During the Black War, Aboriginal clansmen harassed settlers on the east banks of the Tamar and North Esk rivers, where farms adjoined the forested valley heights, stealing food, goods and killing up to 20 people in this vicinity.

Further up the river, just beyond the first substantial bend known to some then as 'Vermont' bend, there used to be a Punt which was active before Hobler's Bridge was built at what is now St. Leonards in 1829 by George Hobler of 'Killafaddy' (1823). The area of North Esk was once an Electoral district. Many notable Tasmanian gentlemen farmers have lived on the North Esk throughout time. Some properties of historical interest still stand on the banks of the river such as 'Braemar' (1821) and 'Vermont' (1819) just outside Launceston. Convicts were used up until the early 1850s to drain the river flats after it was cultivated so it would not deteriorate back into a swamp after flooding. The river was also the main port facility for Launceston until the construction of the Charles Street Bridge.

On the south bank between the Seaport and Victoria Bridge (southern end of Invermay Road) were numerous wharves dating right back to settlement. These wharves were used by the flour mills, breweries, woolsheds and the Mt Mischoff Tin Smelters. Opposite, on the north bank, were more wharves accessible via Lindsay Street that used to support a rail mounted Gantry crane which was used to directly load and unload railcars. Upstream were yet more smaller wharves with one of the furthest upstream being the Dynamite Wharf for the magazine reserve and shooting range. Located on Launceston's Glebe Flats, these isolated buildings include an explosives bunker (1850s/1890s) detonator sheds (1850s), a powder magazine and 2 identical ordnance sheds (1914). These buildings are located as a compound and served the military right through to the Second World War. The site is now located on agricultural land and belongs to 49 Boland Street. All the buildings are heritage listed but are yet to be used for any tourist ventures.

== See also ==
- Rivers of Tasmania
