= Lake Leake, Tasmania =

Lake Leake
- Town
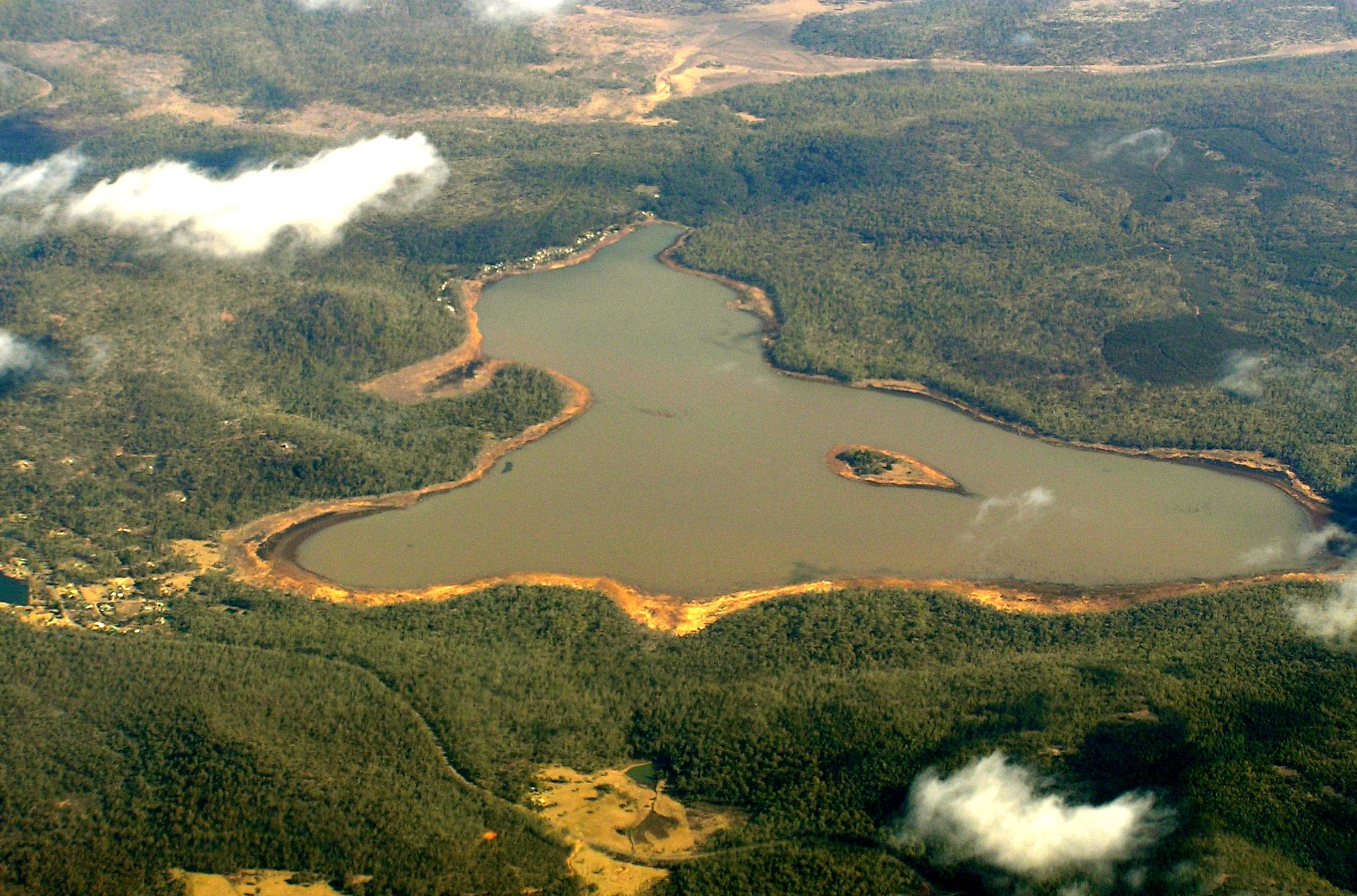
- Aerial photo from the east of Lake Leake (kunawi) showing Rawlinna Village (Kalangadoo) at the left of the lake

- Coordinates: 42°01′S 147°48′E
- Country: Australia
- State: Tasmania
- LGA: Northern Midlands Council (53%), Glamorgan-Spring Bay Council (47%)

Government
  - State electorate: Lyons
  - Federal division: Lyons

Population
  - Total: 176 (2006 census)
- Postcode: 7210

Lake Leake (palawa kani: kunawi) is the name of both a man-made water storage reservoir and a small township in the eastern midlands of Tasmania. The locality is split between two local authorities:

- Northern Midlands Council (53%)
- Glamorgan-Spring Bay Council (47%)

The lake can hold 22.076 gigalitres (779,600,000 cu ft) of water. The lake was named after Charles Henry Leake (1819-1889), a member of the Tasmanian Legislative Council. At the 2006 census, Lake Leake had a population of 176.

== Features and location ==
Lake Leake
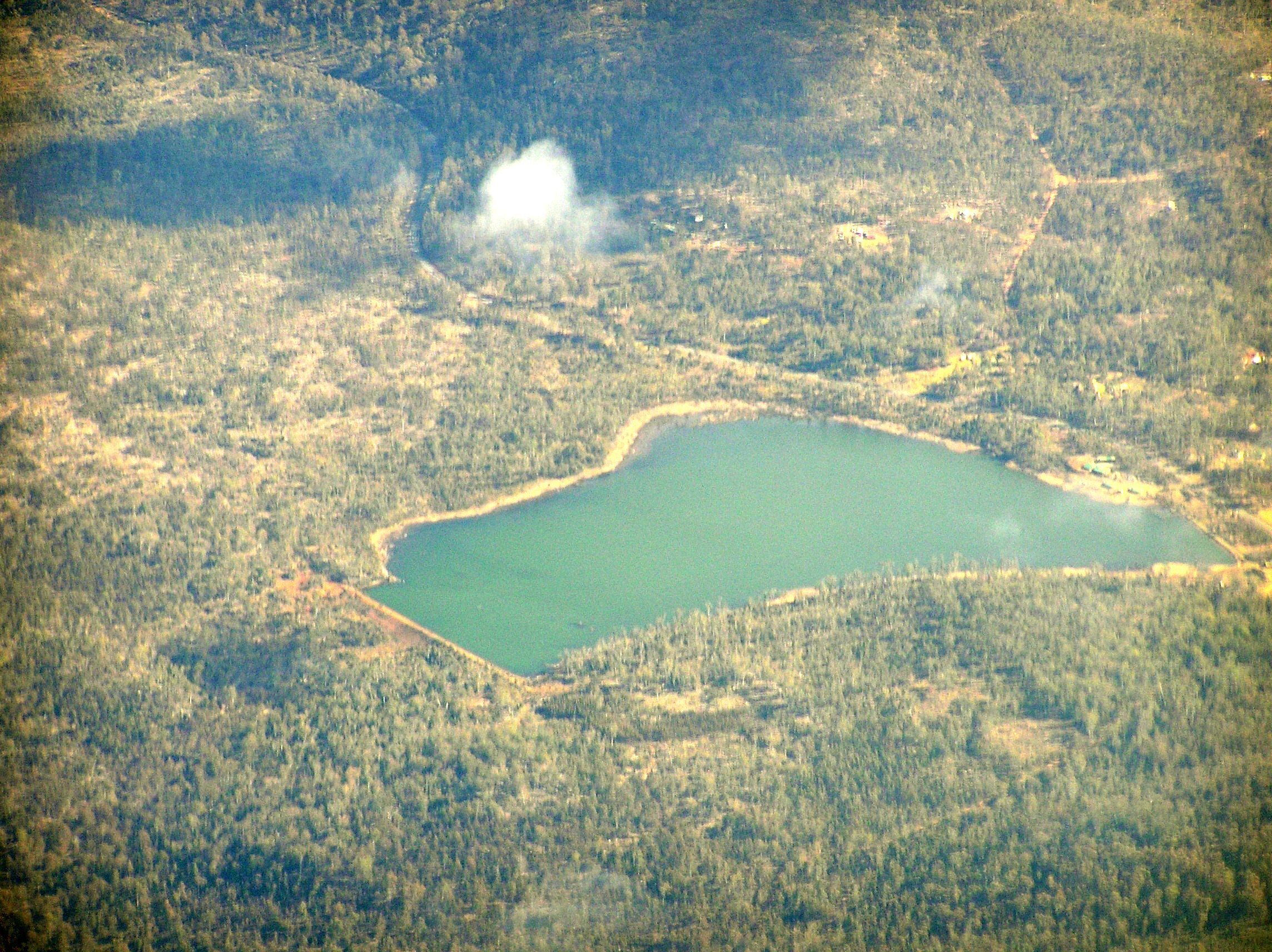
- Lake Yaleena, south of Lake Leake

- Location within Tasmania

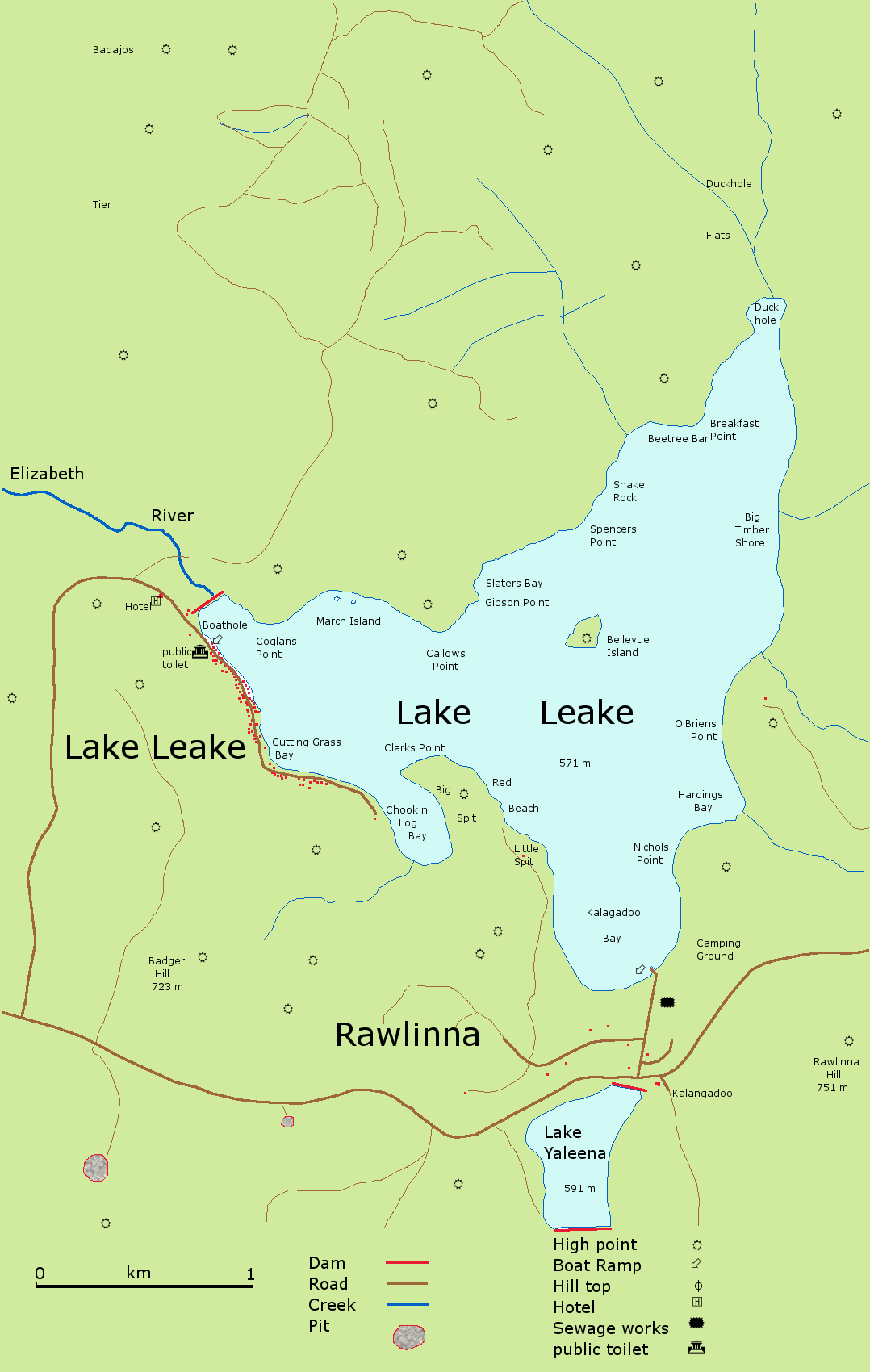
- Location: Tasmania
- Coordinates: 42°0′30″S 147°49′30″E
- Type: Reservoir
- Basin countries: Australia
- Water volume: 22.076 gigalitres (779,600,000 cu ft)

The lake is used for recreational fishing, for brook trout, brown trout and rainbow trout.

The village is built on land owned by the Northern Midlands Council. Inhabitants must purchase a license to have a building there, and are restricted in the number of days per year they can live there. The main purpose is to accommodate recreational anglers.

Water flowing out from the lake has an electrical conductivity of 56 μS/cm.

Rawlinna is a locality located between the south side of the lake and Lake Yaleena, another water impoundment. Lake Yaleena is a privately built dammed lake, specifically for fishing. It is a business that includes accommodation in cabins.

== History ==
The traditional custodians of the area were the Peenrymairmemener clan of the North Midlands nation. The area was originally a wetland, or series of lagoons, and was transcribed by Europeans as koan.ner.we (written in palawa kani as kunawi). The area was described by contemporary colonial British as a "resort of the natives" - an Aboriginal meeting place, and contemporaries describe finding several Aboriginal huts in the area. The area contains remains of Aboriginal artefacts and a quarry where the Peenrymairmemener crafted stone tools.

The area was renamed by colonials "Kearney's Bogs" and then Lake Leake after the dam was constructed. The reservoir was constructed after a long debate. A 5-metre (16 ft) high dam was finished in 1884. The initial capacity was 19.9 cubic metres (700 cu ft) and an area of 6 square kilometres (2.3 sq mi). In 1971 the spillway highest point was raised by 18 centimetres (7.1 in) to increase storage capacity. Water is released for irrigation and also stored to maintain a fishing facility. Lake Leake is usually at least half full.

== Climate ==
Climate data for Lake Leake (1991–2020 normals, extremes 1989–2020)
Month	Jan	Feb	Mar	Apr	May	Jun	Jul	Aug	Sep	Oct	Nov	Dec	Year
Record high °C (°F)	36.2 (97.2)	31.6 (88.9)	32.6 (90.7)	24.1 (75.4)	20.9 (69.6)	15.9 (60.6)	14.0 (57.2)	18.4 (65.1)	22.1 (71.8)	26.2 (79.2)	30.8 (87.4)	33.7 (92.7)	36.2 (97.2)
Mean daily maximum °C (°F)	19.8 (67.6)	19.1 (66.4)	17.5 (63.5)	14.2 (57.6)	11.4 (52.5)	9.1 (48.4)	8.6 (47.5)	9.5 (49.1)	11.5 (52.7)	13.9 (57.0)	16.0 (60.8)	18.0 (64.4)	14.0 (57.2)
Daily mean °C (°F)	14.1 (57.4)	13.7 (56.7)	11.9 (53.4)	9.2 (48.6)	6.8 (44.2)	4.9 (40.8)	4.4 (39.9)	5.0 (41.0)	6.8 (44.2)	8.7 (47.7)	10.7 (51.3)	12.6 (54.7)	9.1 (48.4)
Mean daily minimum °C (°F)	8.5 (47.3)	8.3 (46.9)	6.2 (43.2)	4.1 (39.4)	2.2 (36.0)	0.6 (33.1)	0.2 (32.4)	0.6 (33.1)	2.1 (35.8)	3.5 (38.3)	5.5 (41.9)	7.1 (44.8)	4.1 (39.4)
Record low °C (°F)	−1.6 (29.1)	−0.2 (31.6)	−3.1 (26.4)	−5.9 (21.4)	−8.3 (17.1)	−8.3 (17.1)	−8.3 (17.1)	−7.0 (19.4)	−6.9 (19.6)	−5.2 (22.6)	−3.0 (26.6)	−2.7 (27.1)	−7.2 (19.0)
Average precipitation mm (inches)	55.7 (2.19)	42.2 (1.66)	49.1 (1.93)	54.4 (2.14)	50.0 (1.97)	62.6 (2.46)	61.3 (2.41)	86.5 (3.41)	68.4 (2.69)	60.0 (2.36)	63.6 (2.50)	59.3 (2.33)	713.0 (28.07)
Average precipitation days (≥ 1.0 mm)	5.9	6.5	7.3	7.7	8.3	9.5	11.6	11.7	11.1	10.2	9.4	8.0	107.1
Average dew point °C (°F)	9.1 (48.4)	9.3 (48.7)	7.8 (46.0)	6.2 (43.2)	4.5 (40.1)	3.1 (37.6)	2.5 (36.5)	2.4 (36.3)	3.5 (38.3)	4.4 (39.9)	6.1 (43.0)	7.8 (46.0)	5.6 (42.1)
Mean monthly sunshine hours	249.3	205.0	197.9	160.8	121.9	87.0	103.1	143.9	172.6	213.6	217.0	242.7	2,114.9
Source 1: National Oceanic and Atmospheric Administration
Source 2: Bureau of Meteorology
