= Elizabeth River (Tasmania) =

River in Tasmania, Australia

Elizabeth
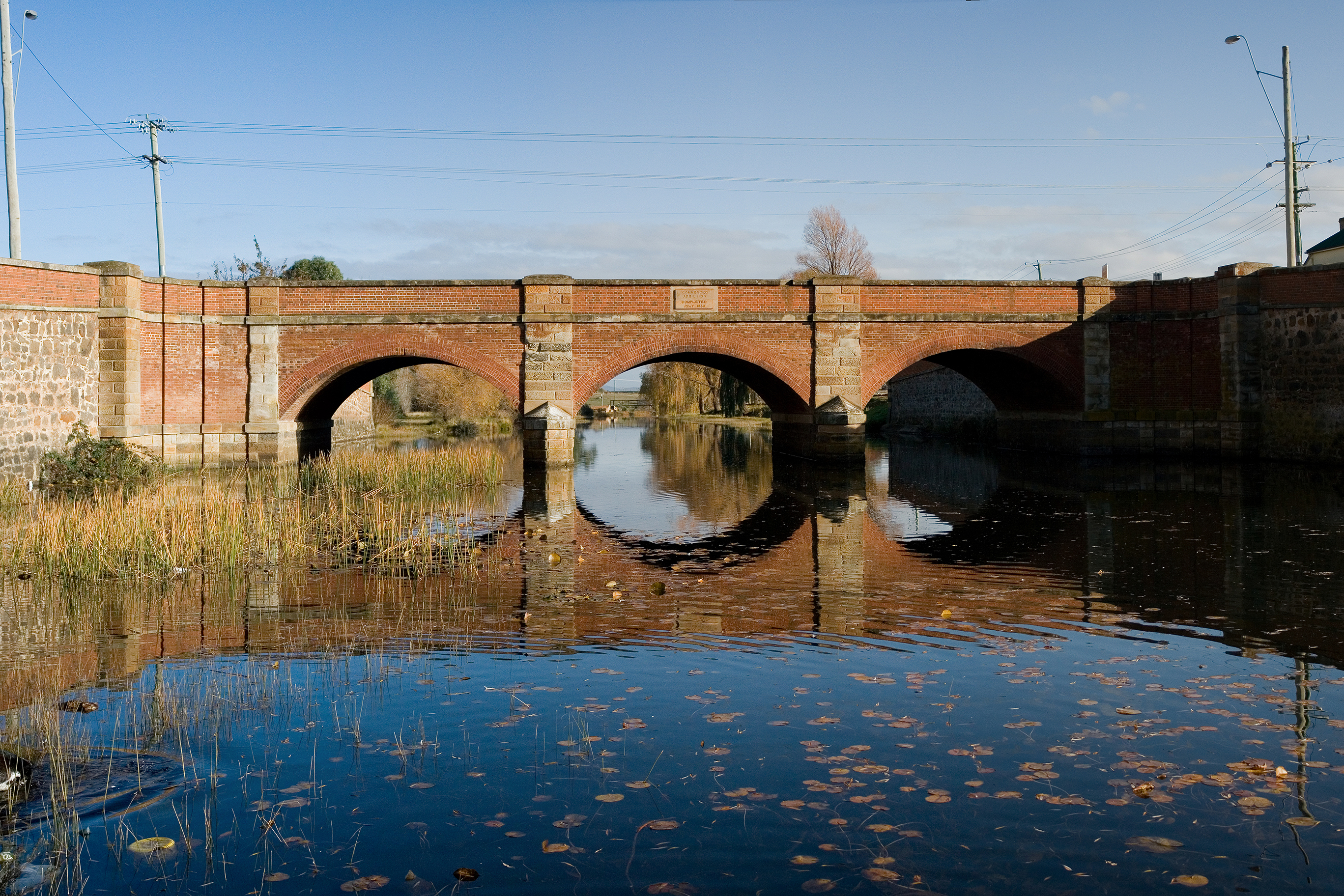

- Location of the Elizabeth River mouth in Tasmania
- Etymology: Elizabeth Macquarie

Location
- Country: Australia
- State: Tasmania
- Region: Midlands (Tasmania)

Physical characteristics
- Source: Lake Leake
  - elevation: 580 m (1,900 ft)
- Mouth: Macquarie River
  - location: north west of Campbell Town
  - coordinates: 41°55′16″S 147°25′32″E
  - elevation: 171 m (561 ft)
- Length: 60 km (37 mi)

Basin features
- River system: South Esk River system
- Reservoir: Lake Leake

The Elizabeth River is a minor perennial river in the Somerset Land District, in the Midlands region of Tasmania, Australia.

== Location and features ==
The Elizabeth River rises below Lake Leake and flows generally west by north through the traditional lands of the Peenrymairmemener and Tyrrernotepanner Clans of the North Midlands Nation. The palawa kani name for the river is pantukina layapinta, the prefix pantukina referring to the country around modern day Campbell Town. The river reaches its confluence with the Macquarie River west of Campbell Town. The river was originally known by colonials in the first decade of the 19th century as Relief Creek, but was renamed by Governor Macquarie, for his wife, when he passed through in 1811. The river descends 410 metres (1,350 ft) over its 60-kilometre (37 mi) course.

The Red Bridge crosses the Elizabeth River at Campbell Town.

== See also ==
- Rivers of Tasmania
