= Campbell Town, Tasmania =

Campbell Town
- Town
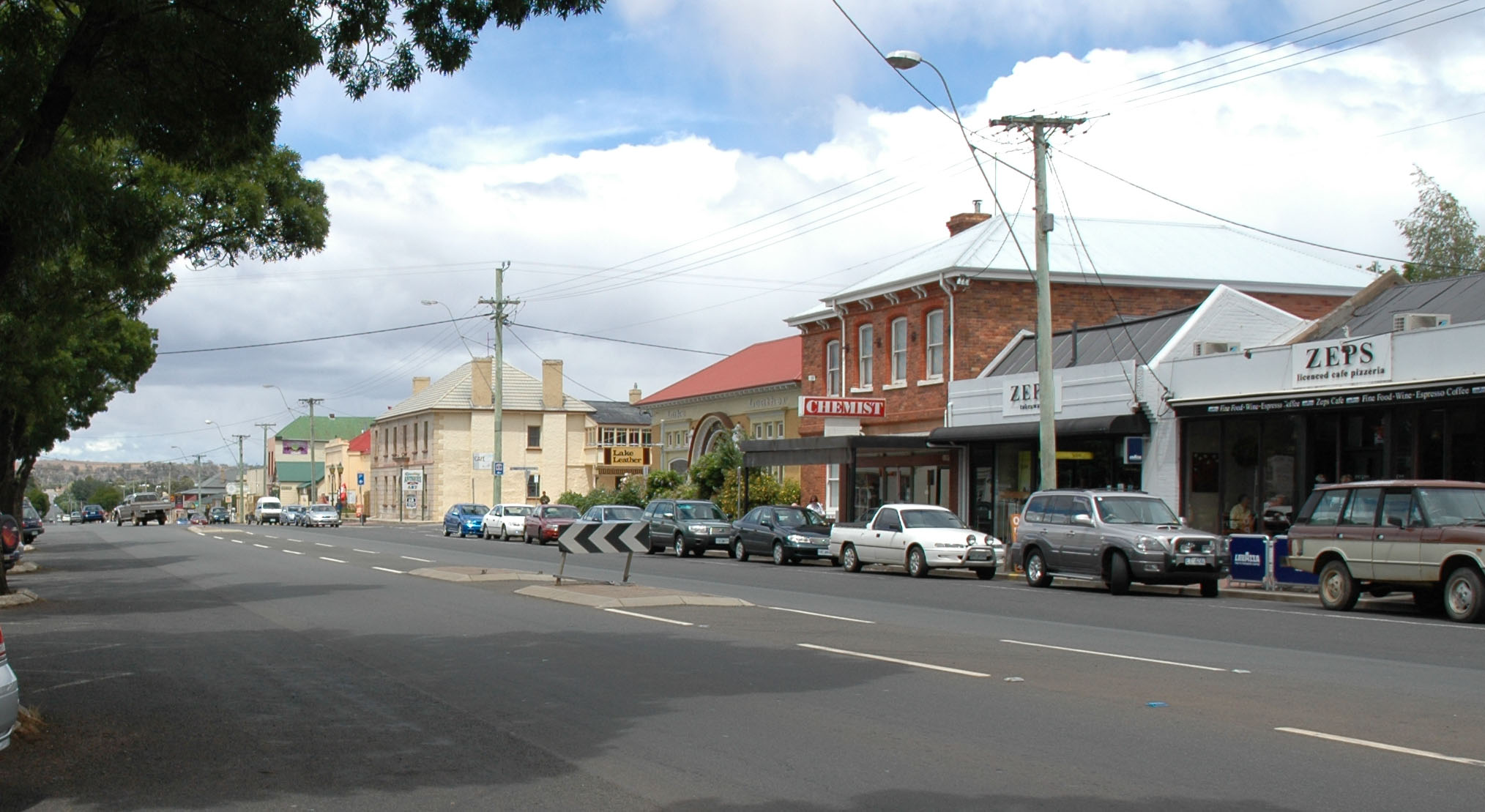
- Main road in centre of Campbell Town, opposite rest area

- Coordinates: 41.928741°S 147.493616°E
- Country: Australia
- State: Tasmania
- LGA: Northern Midlands Council
- Location: 11 km (6.8 mi) from Ross; 49 km (30 mi) from Perth; 68 km (42 mi) from Launceston; 134 km (83 mi) from Hobart
- Established: 1821

Government
  - State electorate: Lyons
  - Federal division: Lyons

Population
  - Total: 823 (2021 census)
- Postcode: 7210

Campbell Town is a town in Tasmania, Australia, on the Midland Highway. At the 2021 census, the town had a population of 823.

== History ==
=== Traditional owners of the Campbell Town area ===
The traditional custodians of the Campbell Town area were the Tyerrernotepanner (chera-noti-pahner) Clan of the North Midlands Nation. The Tyerrernotepanner were a nomadic people who traversed country from the Central Plateau to the Eastern Tiers but were recorded as inhabiting "resorts" around present day Campbell Town, lagoons near present-day Cleveland and Conara and the southern banks of the South Esk River. The colonial name for this clan was the Stony Creek Tribe, named after a small southern tributary of the South Esk at Llewellyn.

The Tyerrernotepanner called the Campbell Town area norerytymonerler or parndokenne. Their name for the hills above Campbell Town ( the Campbell Town Tier) was Lukargener Purntobebenner and the Elizabeth River was parndokennerlyerpinder.

The Tyerrernotepanner were severely depleted as a clan during the first decades of the 1800s, as colonial settlers claimed land up the South Esk and across the fertile plains of the Midlands. Clan hunting and migration was hindered by settler activity, hunting and, finally, armed aggression that culminated in massacres in the uplands and valleys around Campbell Town.

The Tyerrernotepanner were formidable opponents of settler colonisation and aggression during the Black War and were recorded as attacking settlers from the Lake River to The South Esk and Tamar River Valleys during the final phase of Aboriginal resistance in the 1820s and 1830s. The Tyerrernotepanner were led by elders such as Memerlannerlargenna and Eumarrah subjects of fearful reminiscence by settlers after the Black War.

The last members of the Tyerrernotepanner were "conciliated" by George Augustus Robinson and, under orders from Governor Arthur, were exiled from their country to die in the squalor of Wybalenna or Oyster Cove.

=== Colonial Campbell Town ===
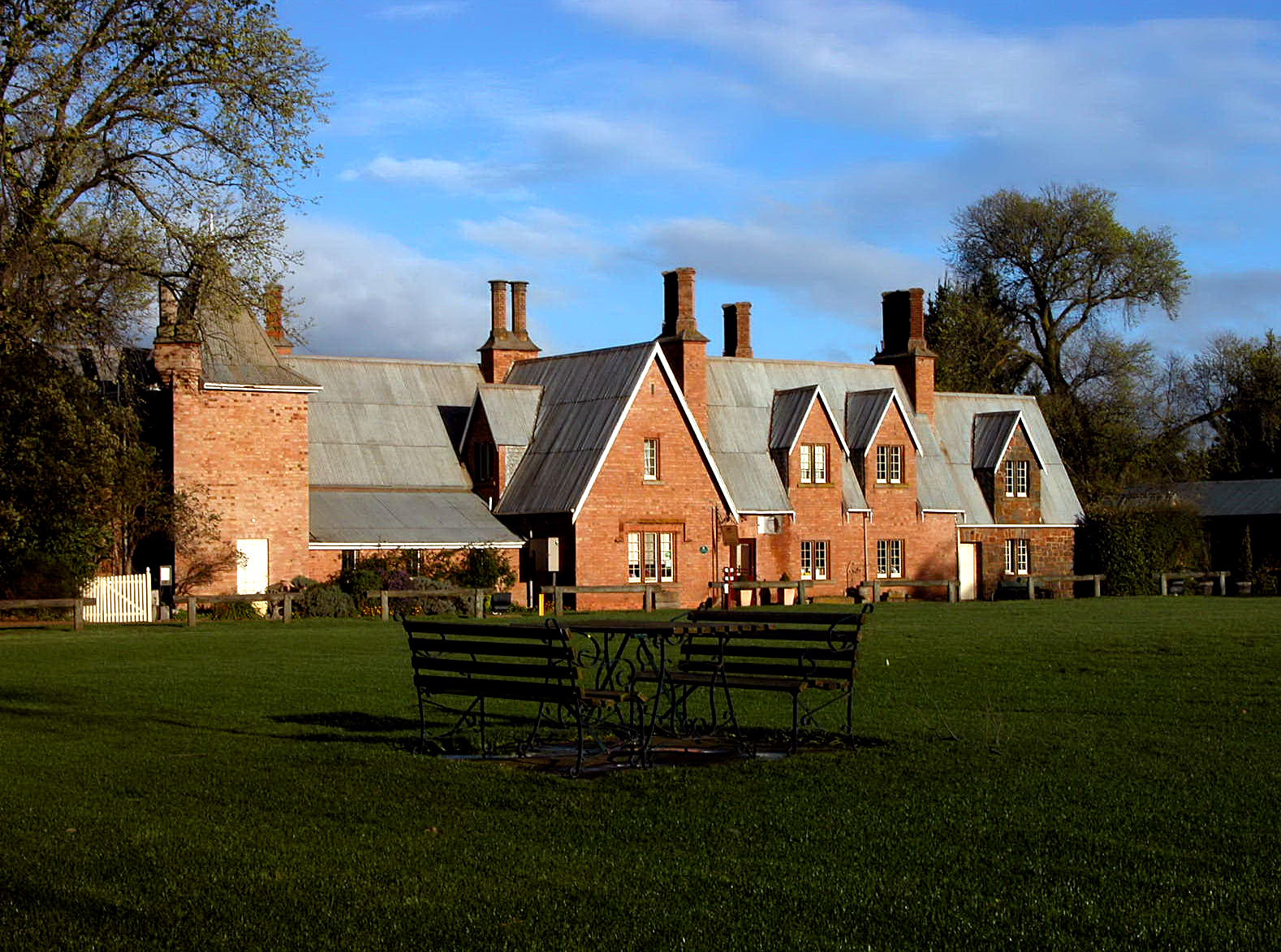
The Grange, the former residence of Dr William Valentine. It now serves as the town meeting centre and function hall.

The area of modern Campbell Town would have been known to colonials in Launceston (then Port Dalrymple), as the name of the river passing through was already known as Relief Creek. Lachlan Macquarie renamed it after his wife Elizabeth Campbell when passing through in 1811. The site of modern Campbell Town was named by Macquarie in 1821 on his second tour of Van Diemen's Land; continuing his habit of renaming Tasmanian landforms after his family and friends, it was named for his wife's maiden name. The first settler at the site of modern Campbell town was Thomas Kenton, a constable, who erected a cottage here around 1821. By 1823, a causeway had been erected over the river, and in 1824 an inn with accommodation for travellers was opened.

Campbell Town was established as a town in 1826 and became one of the four garrison towns linking Hobart and Launceston. Campbell Town had two or three soldiers permanently stationed there, with their main headquarters at Ross. As the threat from the Aboriginal clans decreased, the soldiers were replaced by convict police, who established stations in the town and in the surrounding tiers and rivers; primarily as a means of controlling or capturing escaped convicts.

The establishment and growth of Campbell Town as a police district headquarters and commercial centre paralleled the change in Van Diemen's Land agricultural economy from a peasant farming base to a more capital-intensive land grant system.

By 1836, a decade after its establishment, the Campbell Town district already had established major landholders, free settlers who had displaced both indigenous people and any smaller colonial landholders, and some established cropping and pastoral holdings with a total sheep population of 180,000. By the mid 1830s, Campbell Town was a garrison town with a court house, a jail, a police magistrates' house, two hotels, two inns, and emancipated former convicts running stores and mechanics' shops. The growth of agriculture, housing and infrastructure was facilitated by the labour of assigned men, and household labour was facilitated by both male and female convict labourers. The obverse to this "free" convict labour was the enormous paramilitary and penal infrastructure required to maintain the convict system. Gentlemen farmers and retired military officers were appointed by governor Arthur as magistrates to impose the laws of the colony on this frontier area.

Campbell Town Post Office opened on 1 June 1832.

Today, the town acts as the only major rest area on the Midland Highway, with toilets, a park, a large car park, and a range of food outlets. Campbell Town is also the retail centre for much of the southern part of the Midlands Municipality.

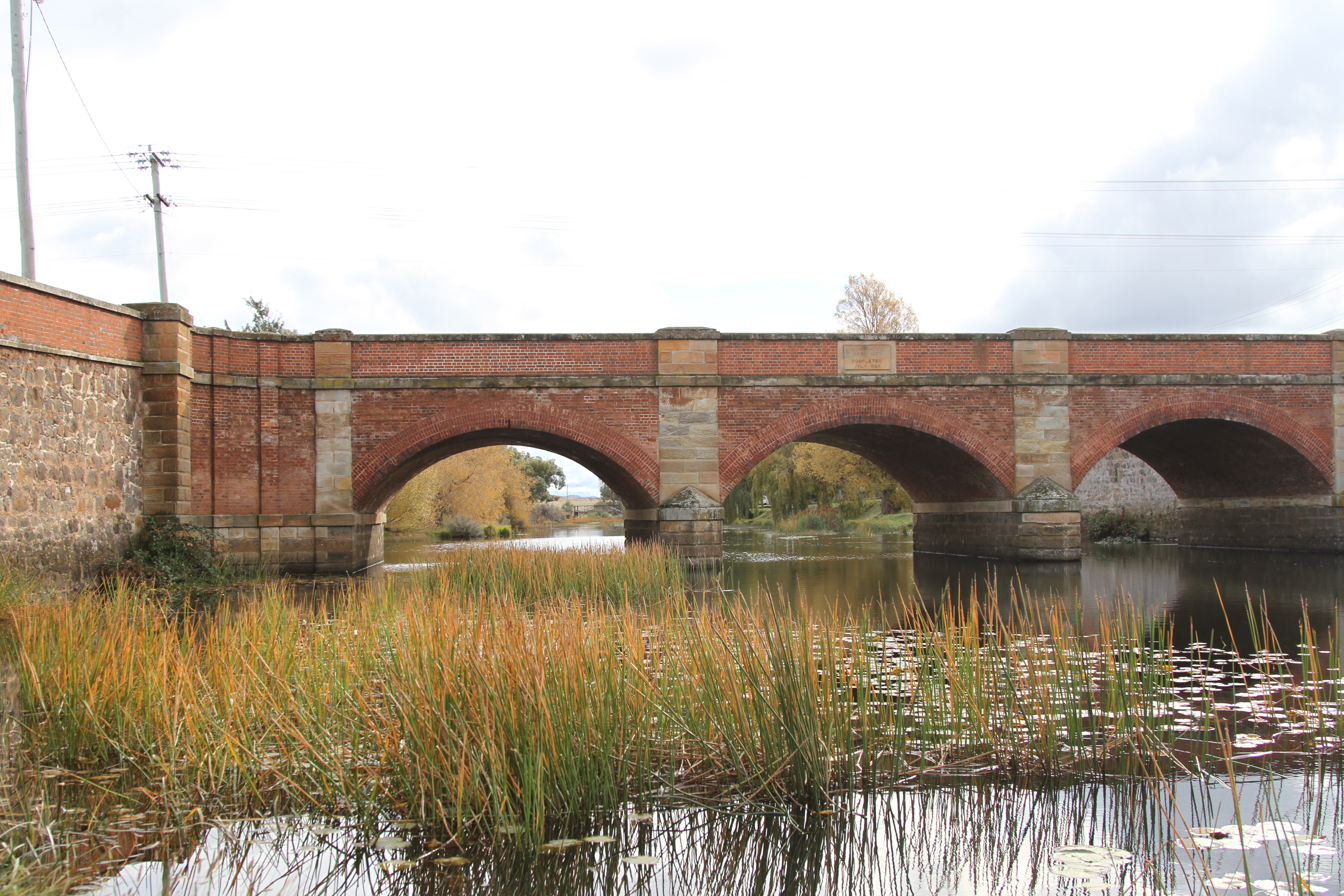
Red Bridge – Campbell Town, Tasmania

One of Campbell Town's features is the convict-built Red Bridge, the oldest surviving brick arch bridge in Australia, as well as the oldest bridge anywhere on the National Highway. The bridge and causeway were built as a part of the original main road; it was to be a part of Bell's line of Road, but this road never got past Oatlands. Construction was commenced in 1836 and completed in 1838. It consists of drystone abutments and timber top, although the top has been replaced, the stone abutments are original, making this a rare example of early Australian stone work.

Campbell Town is also home to the Foxhunters Return, a colonial Georgian coaching inn which retains all its original outbuildings. Built by convicts around 1833 for publican and landowner, William Broad, with the main building constructed under the direction of stonemason Hugh Keane, Foxhunters Return is described by the National Trust as "the finest and most substantial hotel building of the late colonial period in Australia." In 1861, Broad built the adjoining William Broad Cottage, which also survives. During the construction of the Red Bridge, convicts were reputed to be housed overnight in the extensive cellars beneath Foxhunters Return, which is situated on the banks of the Elizabeth River and adjacent to the Red Bridge.

== Attractions ==
Given the history of Campbell Town, there are an abundance of colonial buildings that have been well preserved. The town offers tourists a heritage walk, showcasing notable structures like the Red Bridge, Campbell Town Convict Brick Trail and Lake Leake. Valentines Park in the town's center showcases a felled hardwood log known colloquially as "The Log" or "Big Log". The town is also noted for the Transit of Venus, which was first observed by the US Navy in 1874.

== Notable people ==
- Harold Gatty, recipient of the US Distinguished Flying Cross, was born in Campbell Town.
- Marguerite Helen Power (1870–1957), poet, was born in Campbell Town.
