= Boyd River (Tasmania) =

River in Tasmania, Australia

Boyd
- Location of the Boyd River mouth in Tasmania

Location
- Country: Australia
- State: Tasmania
- Region: South Western

Physical characteristics
- Source: Sentinel Range
  - location: below Mount Wedge
  - coordinates: 42°50′52″S 146°18′17″E
  - elevation: 786 m (2,579 ft)
- Mouth: Wedge River
  - location: Lake Gordon
  - coordinates: 42°46′56″S 146°13′34″E
  - elevation: 295 m (968 ft)
- Length: 25 km (16 mi)

Basin features
- River system: Gordon River catchment
- Reservoir: Lake Gordon

The Boyd River, part of the Gordon River catchment, is a perennial river in the south western region of Tasmania, Australia.

== Course and features ==
The Boyd River rises in the Sentinel Range below Mount Wedge and flows generally north and reaches its confluence with the Wedge River within the now-flooded Lake Gordon. The river descends 491 metres (1,611 ft) over its 25-kilometre (16 mi) course.

== See also ==
- Rivers of Tasmania
