= Rocky Point, California =

Rocky Point, California may refer to:

- Rocky Point, Lompoc Valley, Santa Barbara, California
- Rocky Point, Lower Lake, California
- Rocky Point, Weldon, California
- Rocky Point, Susanville, California
- Rocky Point, Lake Isabella, California
- Rocky Point, Jenner, California
- Rocky Point, Lakeport, California
- Rocky Point, La Jolla, California
- Rocky Point, Twentynine Palms, California
