= Apsley River (Tasmania) =

River in Tasmania, Australia

Coordinates: 41°59′19″S 148°13′03″E

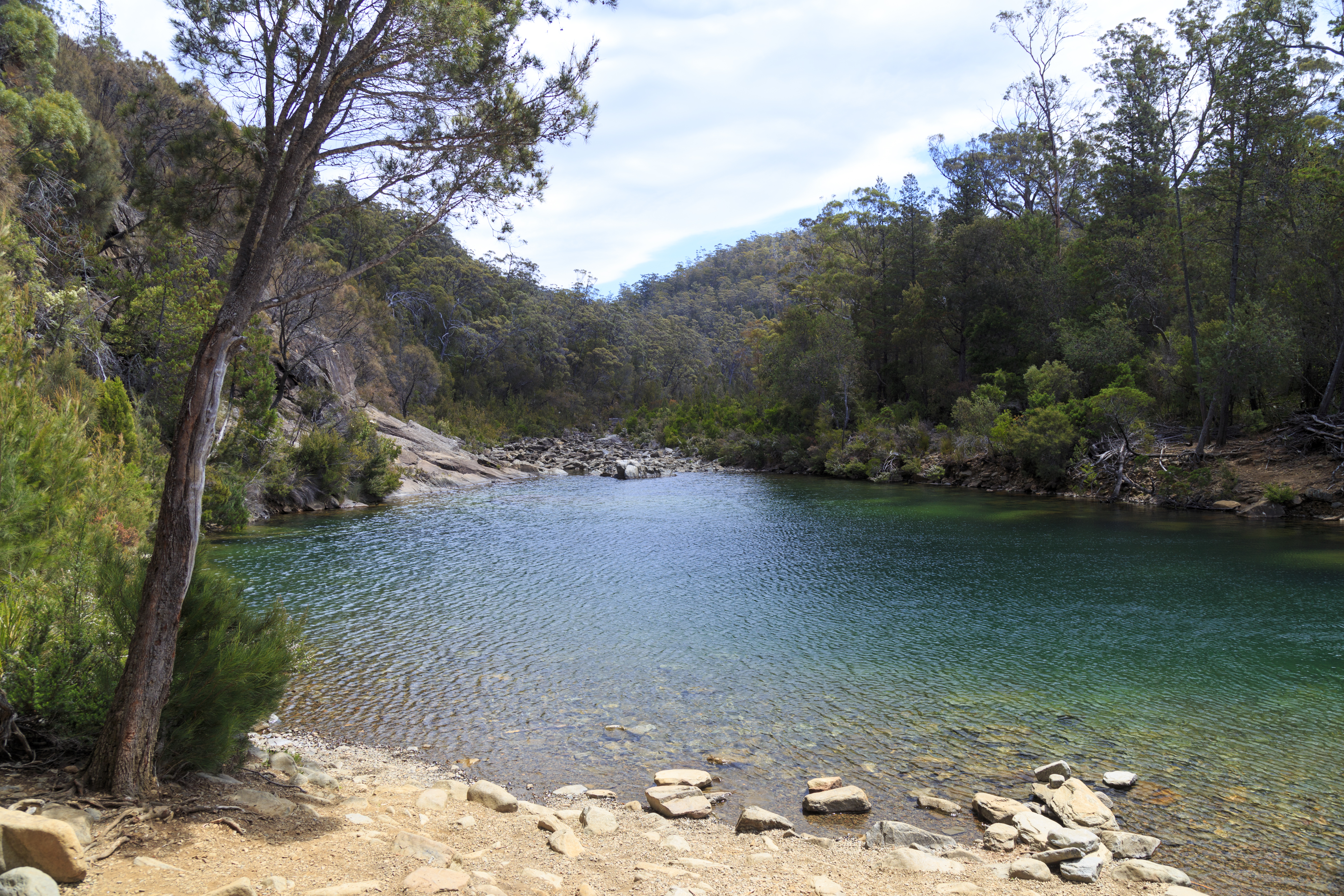
Apsley Waterhole in Douglas-Apsley National Park

The Apsley River is a river in Tasmania, Australia. The river flows into the Tasman Sea.

== History ==
The river is named after Lord Apsley, Earl Bathurst. The river had serious flooding in 1922. The river catchment and the Douglas River were visited by wilderness photographers in the 1980s. The river is one of the features of the Douglas-Apsley National Park in eastern Tasmania.

== Environment ==
The flowering plant Scaevola aemula grows in the Great Oyster Bay region between the Prosser River and Apsley River.

== Politics ==
The river gave its name to the former electoral division of Apsley.

== See also ==
- List of rivers of Tasmania
