= Hartz Mountains (Tasmania) =

Mountain range in Tasmania, Australia

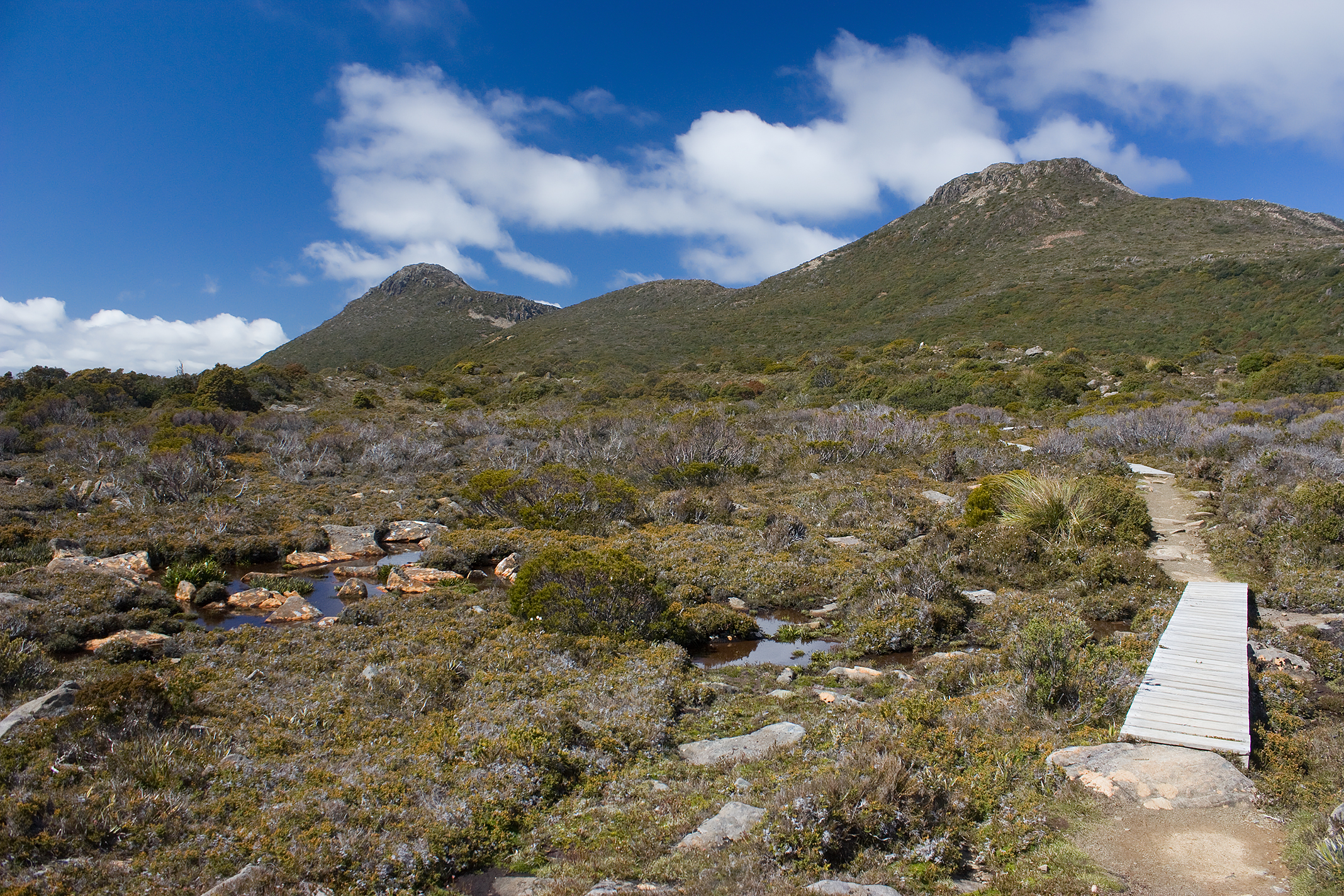
- Hartz Mountain and Mount Snowy

Highest point
- Elevation: 1,254 m (4,114 ft)AHD
- Prominence: 838 m (2,749 ft)
- Isolation: 16.16 km (10.04 mi)
- Coordinates: 43°14′24″S 146°45′36″E

Geography
- Location within Tasmania
- Location: Southern Tasmania, Australia
- Parent range: Hartz Range

The Hartz Mountains are mountains with twin peaks located in southern Tasmania, Australia. The mountains are situated 55 kilometres (34 mi) south west of Hobart, via Geeveston, and are part of the Hartz Mountains National Park. The Hartz Mountains area experiences typical south-west weather conditions. In all seasons there can be snow, chilling rains, low temperatures, strong winds, upslope fog and sudden weather changes.

With an elevation of 1,254 metres (4,114 ft) above sea level, the Hartz Peak is the highest point of the Hartz Mountains, and in fine weather the summit offers one of the best views of the southwest and north. This walk (5 hours return) is only for fit and experienced walkers.

== Climate ==
Climate data for the region are sourced from Keoghs Pimple, at an altitude of 831 metres (2,726 ft) and operating since 1996. It is an extremely rainy climate with 252 such days per annum, though which tends to fall as light showers or drizzle, with frequent snowfalls that can occur at any time of the year. The mean afternoon relative humidity, is likewise extraordinary.

Climate data for Hartz Mountain (Keoghs Pimple, 1996–2022); 831 m AMSL; 43.20° S, 146.77° E
Month	Jan	Feb	Mar	Apr	May	Jun	Jul	Aug	Sep	Oct	Nov	Dec	Year
Record high °C (°F)	35.2 (95.4)	32.6 (90.7)	34.0 (93.2)	24.3 (75.7)	18.8 (65.8)	14.8 (58.6)	13.2 (55.8)	16.6 (61.9)	24.8 (76.6)	26.5 (79.7)	30.0 (86.0)	34.0 (93.2)	35.2 (95.4)
Mean daily maximum °C (°F)	17.8 (64.0)	17.2 (63.0)	14.6 (58.3)	11.1 (52.0)	8.5 (47.3)	6.9 (44.4)	5.9 (42.6)	6.6 (43.9)	8.6 (47.5)	11.0 (51.8)	13.7 (56.7)	15.1 (59.2)	11.4 (52.6)
Mean daily minimum °C (°F)	7.2 (45.0)	7.1 (44.8)	6.3 (43.3)	4.6 (40.3)	3.4 (38.1)	2.3 (36.1)	1.4 (34.5)	1.3 (34.3)	1.9 (35.4)	2.7 (36.9)	4.3 (39.7)	5.3 (41.5)	4.0 (39.2)
Record low °C (°F)	−0.1 (31.8)	−0.2 (31.6)	−0.8 (30.6)	−1.8 (28.8)	−2.5 (27.5)	−3.0 (26.6)	−3.7 (25.3)	−4.4 (24.1)	−3.4 (25.9)	−3.4 (25.9)	−2.8 (27.0)	−1.2 (29.8)	−4.4 (24.1)
Average precipitation mm (inches)	61.9 (2.44)	62.8 (2.47)	74.5 (2.93)	74.1 (2.92)	90.9 (3.58)	99.9 (3.93)	104.6 (4.12)	129.2 (5.09)	97.7 (3.85)	97.8 (3.85)	78.3 (3.08)	81.4 (3.20)	1,097.4 (43.20)
Average precipitation days (≥ 0.2 mm)	16.1	16.1	19.2	20.1	23.2	21.4	25.3	25.1	23.3	22.8	19.5	19.6	251.7
Average afternoon relative humidity (%)	67	69	77	84	90	91	92	86	84	79	73	73	80
Source: Australian Bureau of Meteorology

== See also ==
- List of mountains in Australia § Tasmania
