= Anne River (Tasmania) =

River in Tasmania, Australia

Anne
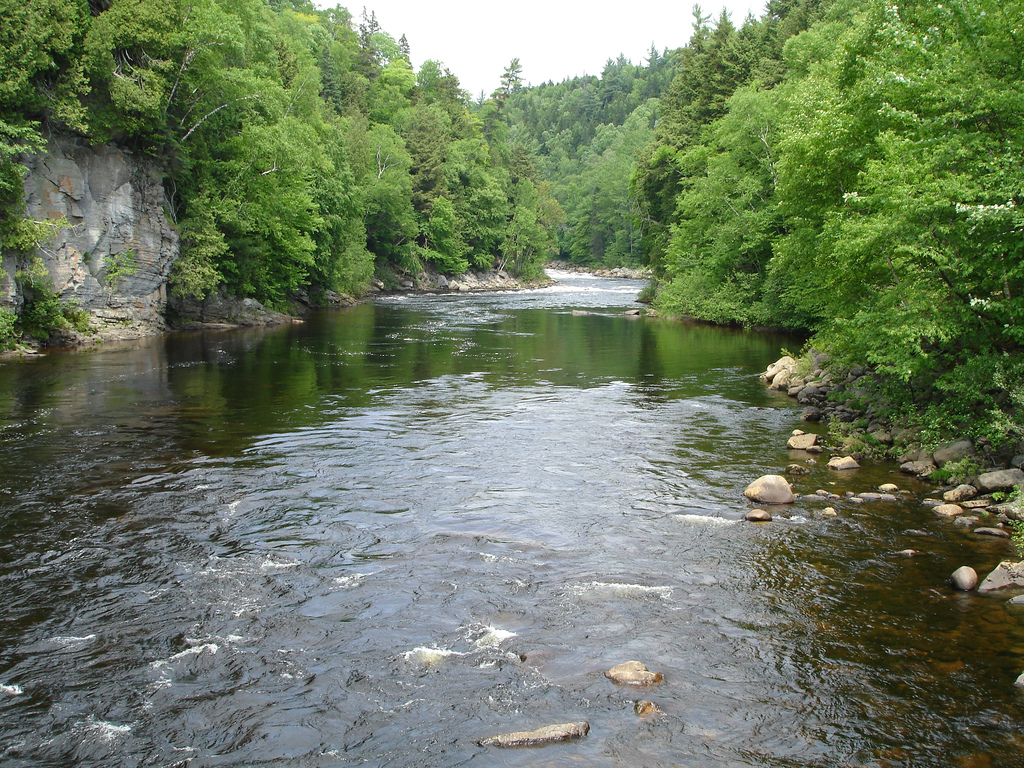

- Location of mouth of the Anne River in Tasmania
- Etymology: Mount Anne

Location
- Country: Australia
- State: Tasmania
- Region: South West

Physical characteristics
- Source: Mount Anne and Mount Sara Jane
  - location: Lake Judd
  - coordinates: 42°59′20″S 146°25′39″E
  - elevation: 595 m (1,952 ft)
- Mouth: Huon River
  - coordinates: 43°05′13″S 146°27′30″E
  - elevation: 159 m (522 ft)
- Length: 20 km (12 mi)

Basin features
- River system: Huon River catchment
- Lake: Lake Judd

The Anne River is a perennial river located in the south-west region of Tasmania, Australia. At 20 kilometres (12 mi) in length, the Anne River is extremely steep and flows through parts of the Tasmanian Wilderness World Heritage Area.

== Location and features ==
Drained by runoff from Mount Anne and Mount Sara Jane, the river forms below Lake Judd and steeply flows generally west and then south by east with an average gradient of 24 metres per kilometre (130 ft/mi) and a peak grade of 77 metres per kilometre (410 ft/mi). With no significant tributaries, the Anne River reaches its confluence with the Huon River in remote wilderness country. The river descends 436 metres (1,430 ft) over its 20-kilometre (12 mi) course.

The Anne River is a remote wilderness area, visited by avid bushwalkers. The river has only been navigated on a few occasions by kayakers.

== See also ==
- List of rivers of Tasmania
