= Cascade River (Tasmania) =

River in Tasmania, Australia

Cascade
- Location of the Cascade River mouth in Tasmania

Location
- Country: Australia
- State: Tasmania
- Region: North-east

Physical characteristics
- Source
  - location: below Bells Hill
  - coordinates: 41°14′55″S 147°51′28″E
  - elevation: 515 m (1,690 ft)
- Mouth: Ringarooma River
  - location: Derby
  - coordinates: 41°08′57″S 147°48′18″E
  - elevation: 148 m (486 ft)
- Length: 10 km (6.2 mi)

Basin features
- River system: Ringarooma River catchment

The Cascade River, part of the Ringarooma River catchment, is a perennial river in the north-east region of Tasmania, Australia.

== Location and features ==
The river rises below Bells Hill and flows generally north by west, through the Cascade Dam, and reaches its mouth near Derby where it merges with the Ringarooma River. The river descends 367 metres (1,204 ft) over its 10-kilometre (6.2 mi) course.

The river flooded in April 1929, following unusually heavy rains in northern Tasmania. After rainfall of 125 millimetres (4.9 in) in ninety minutes, the Briseis Dam gave way upstream of Derby, causing a torrent of water to rush down the narrow gorge of the Cascade River. At the time, the flood was the worst in Tasmanian history, lasting several days. Thousands of buildings were damaged and the death toll is variously reported to be between 14 and 22. After the 1929 Briseis Dam Disaster, a dam across the Cascade River was rebuilt in 1936 as the 49-hectare (120-acre) Cascade Dam.

== See also ==
- List of rivers of Australia § Tasmania
