= Ringarooma River =

River in Tasmania, Australia

Ringarooma
- Location of the Ringarooma River mouth in Tasmania

Location
- Country: Australia
- State: Tasmania
- Region: North-east
- Settlements: Ringarooma, Branxholm

Physical characteristics
- Source: Mount Maurice
  - location: Mount Maurice Forest Reserve
  - coordinates: 41°18′27″S 147°35′13″E
  - elevation: 1,020 m (3,350 ft)
- Mouth: Tasman Sea
  - location: Ringarooma Bay
  - coordinates: 40°51′49″S 147°52′56″E
  - elevation: 0 m (0 ft)
- Length: 124 km (77 mi)

Basin features
- Tributaries
  - left: Maurice River (Tasmania)
  - right: Dorset River, Cascade River, Weld River (Tasmania), Wyniford River
- Nature reserves: Mount Maurice Forest Reserve, Boobyalla Conservation Area

The Ringarooma River is a perennial river in the north-east region of Tasmania, Australia.

== Location and features ==
The Ringarooma River rises below Mount Maurice and flows generally east by north, joined by ten tributaries including the Maurice River (Tasmania), Dorset, Cascade, Weld, and Wyniford rivers. In the lower reaches of the river, the topography comprises a floodplain and forms part of the Ramsar Lower Ringarooma River wetland. The river reaches its mouth and empties into the Tasman Sea at the Ringarooma Bay. The river descends 1,020 metres (3,350 ft) over its 124-kilometre (77 mi) course.

The Tasman Highway crosses the river on multiple occasions as part of its course.

== See also ==
- List of rivers of Australia § Tasmania
