= Nelson River (Tasmania) =

Physical characteristics
- Mouth: Lake Burbury
  - coordinates: 42°06′51″S 145°41′37″E

The Nelson River, is located in the UNESCO World Heritage–listed Tasmanian Wilderness, in the West Coast region of Tasmania, Australia. It is a tributary into Lake Burbury, previously directly into the upper region of King River

The river valley is part of the King River glaciation area. In general it is distinguished from the glacialisation on the western side of the West Coast Range.

The river valley is the location of limestone caves, that have been studied for archaeological materials.

== Location and features ==
The river is situated in the Franklin-Gordon Wild Rivers National Park, accessible from Queenstown, located 27 kilometres (17 mi) to the east, via the Lyell Highway through the Nelson Valley. It includes the Nelson Falls feature in the valley.

== See also ==
- Kutikina_Cave
