= Point Hibbs =

Point in Tasmania, Australia

- Cape
- Location within Tasmania
- Coordinates: 42°36′36″S 145°15′36″E
- Location: South West Tasmania

UNESCO World Heritage Site
- Official name: Tasmanian Wilderness
- Location: Oceania
- Criteria: iii, iv, vi, vii, viii, ix, x
- Reference: 181
- Inscription: 1982 (6th Session)

Point Hibbs is a headland on the south-west coast of Tasmania, Australia. The headland is located south of the most southern point of Macquarie Harbour, and west of the Gordon River. It is the next named feature along the coast south of Cape Sorell that is used to delineate sections of the coast. Like South West Cape, it is used as a reference point for nearby wrecks.

It is on the north side of the point, that the Hibbs Pyramid rock, and the Hibbs Lagoon lie. The lagoon is a recommended seaplane landing location, and the beach a helicopter landing location and supply-drop area for walkers on the coastline. The Hibbs River enters the bay at the north end, flowing into the lagoon. The lagoon is less than 20 kilometres (12 mi) from Birchs Inlet.

The point has also been a location of whale strandings.

The south side of the headland on which Point Hibbs occurs, has Spero Bay, and the mouth of the Spero River. The south side of the bay is lined by a small rocky headland with Lowren Hill of 116m behind it. The next bay south is Endeavour Bay.

The Spero River was a location of timber milling in the 1930s.

The geology of the area has sparked interest for over a hundred years, but no known mining activity has been sustained in the area.

== See also ==
- Sandy Cape
