= Prosser River =

River in Tasmania, Australia

Coordinates: 42°33′15″S 147°52′47″E

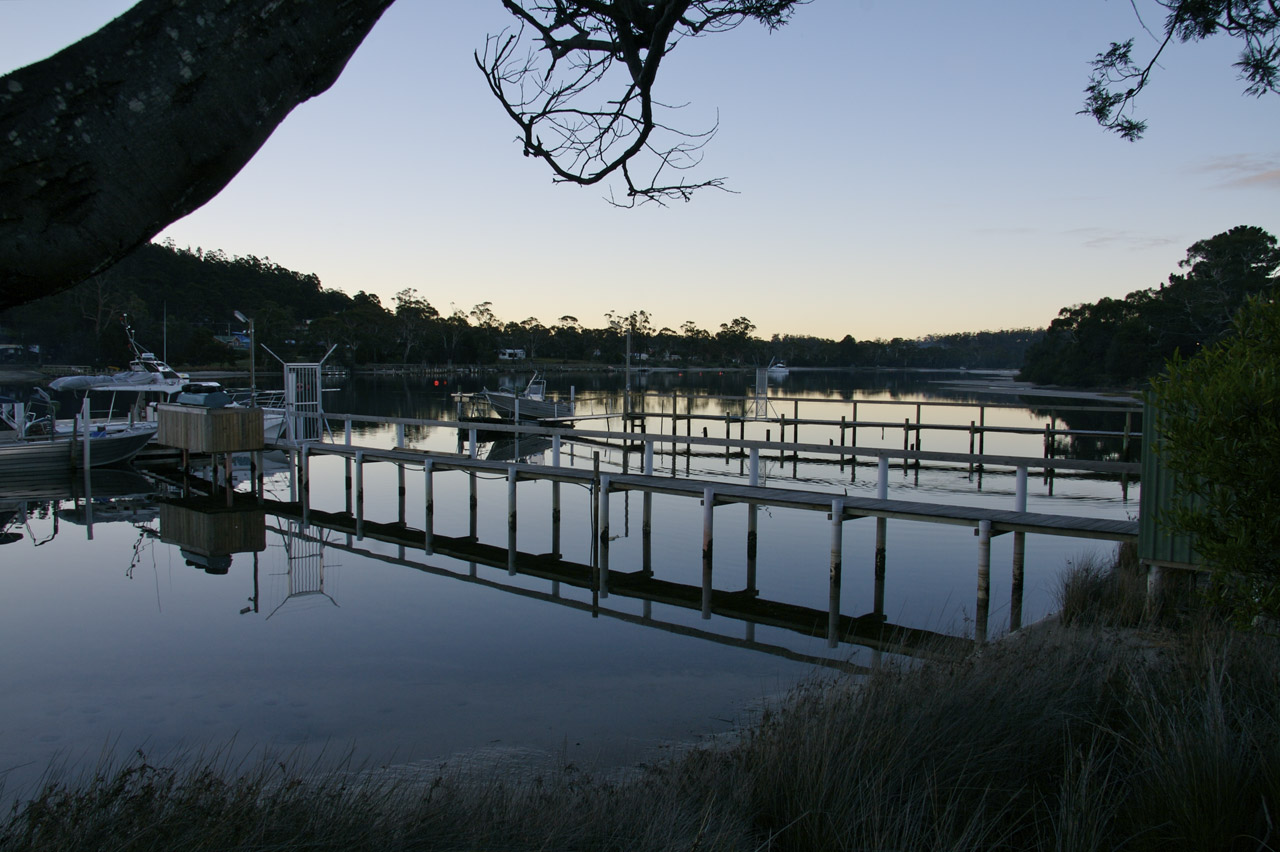
Piers at dusk on the Prosser River in Orford.

The Prosser River is a river in Tasmania, Australia. The river flows into the Tasman Sea.

== Environment ==
The Prosser River Reserve is home to at least 11 at-risk plant and animal species. The Prosser River is virtually unnavigable except at maximum tide. The Old Convict Road trail follows the northern side of the Prosser River for 1km. The flowering plant Scaevola aemula occurs in the Great Oyster Bay region between the Prosser River and Apsley River in Tasmania.

== Politics ==
The river gives its name to the electoral division of Prosser.

== See also ==
- List of rivers of Tasmania
