= East Coast, Tasmania =

Region of Tasmania, Australia

East Coast Tasmania
- Region
- Country: Australia
- State: Tasmania
- Region: Mainland Tasmania, Tasman Sea
- LGA: Glamorgan Spring Bay Council, Break O'Day Council, Sorell Council, parts of Huon Valley Council and Tasman Council
- Location: 0 km (0 mi) from Hobart; 185 km (115 mi) from Launceston; 0 km (0 mi) from St Helens

Government
  - State electorate: Lyons
  - Federal division: Lyons
- Postcode: 7215–7216, 7190, 7214, 7173 (approx.)

East Coast Tasmania is a loosely defined geographic region on the eastern seaboard of the island state of Tasmania, Australia. Stretching from the southern approaches of Cockle Creek and Bruny Island in the south to the remote Bay of Fires in the northeast, the region is known for its coastal beauty, national parks, and historic settlements. It is one of Tasmania’s most visited areas, popular for its mild climate, beaches, fishing, wineries, and bushwalking.

== Geography ==
The East Coast follows the Tasman Sea from the Huon River and D'Entrecasteaux Channel estuary in the south through to Eddystone Point and the Mount William National Park in the northeast. It includes both rugged coastlines and wide sandy beaches, with prominent geological features such as the pink granite peaks of Freycinet Peninsula, dolerite cliffs near Maria Island, and layered sedimentary rock formations at Tessellated Pavement near Eaglehawk Neck. Recherche Bay is located on the extreme south-eastern corner of the East Coast.

=== Islands and offshore features ===
Several islands lie off the east coast, including:

- Bruny Island – located in the D'Entrecasteaux Channel and linked by ferry from Kettering, known for wildlife, produce and bushwalks
- Maria Island – a former penal settlement and now national park, accessible by ferry from Triabunna via the Mercury Passage
- Schouten Island – located off Freycinet Peninsula, within the Freycinet National Park
- Tasman Island – a windswept island off the Tasman Peninsula, home to a historic lighthouse
- Sloping Island, Wedge Island and other smaller isles in the Norfolk Bay and Mercury Passage

=== Water bodies ===
Major bays, channels and coastal inlets include:

- D'Entrecasteaux Channel
  - North-West Bay (a large bay within the D'Entrecasteaux Channel)
- Mercury Passage
- Pitt Water
- Norfolk Bay
- Georges Bay
- Great Oyster Bay
  - Wineglass Bay (a sub-bay of Great Oyster Bay)

=== Rivers ===
Significant rivers that drain into the east coast or nearby water bodies include:

- River Derwent – the largest river in southern Tasmania, entering Storm Bay near Hobart.
- Huon River – flowing into the D'Entrecasteaux Channel.
- Prosser River – flowing through Orford into Prosser Bay.
- Little Swanport River
- Apsley River – passing through Douglas-Apsley National Park.
- George River – flowing through St Helens into Georges Bay.
- Douglas River and Moulting Lagoon – wetlands significant for birdlife.

== Human geography ==
There is no singular population figure for the East Coast, as it is a geographic and cultural region rather than an administrative unit. The combined population of its major towns, including St Helens, Swansea, Bicheno, and Triabunna, totals several thousand residents.

Major settlements include:

- Sorell – a historic agricultural town and regional hub.
- Orford and Triabunna – gateway towns to Maria Island.
- Bicheno – a fishing and tourist town known for its penguin colonies and blowhole.
- Coles Bay – base for visiting Freycinet National Park.
- Swansea – a historic town with heritage buildings and wine tourism.
- St Helens – the largest town on the East Coast and centre for fishing, aquaculture and tourism.
- Dunalley – located on the isthmus to the Tasman Peninsula.
- Nubeena – the main town on the Tasman Peninsula.

=== Transport ===
The East Coast is traversed primarily by the Tasman Highway (A3), which runs from Hobart to St Helens via Sorell, Orford, Swansea, Bicheno, and Scamander. Ferry services operate:

- Between Kettering and Bruny Island
- From Triabunna to Maria Island
- Seasonal tours from Hobart to the Tasman Peninsula, Bruny Island, and Maria Island

== Tourism ==
Tourism is one of the East Coast’s main economic drivers. Notable destinations and activities include:

- Freycinet National Park – home to Wineglass Bay and walking tracks such as the Hazard Circuit and Mt Amos
- Maria Island National Park – offering wildlife experiences, World Heritage-listed convict ruins, and scenic walks
- Bay of Fires – known for its white sand beaches and orange lichen-covered granite rocks
- Douglas-Apsley National Park – inland gorges and dry sclerophyll forest
- Port Arthur Historic Site – a former penal settlement and major heritage tourism site
- Bruny Island – known for its wildlife, food trails, and coastal cruises

== Environment ==
The East Coast contains several conservation areas, including national parks, marine reserves, and Ramsar wetlands. The region is home to diverse ecosystems ranging from temperate rainforests to dry coastal heathlands. Important bird habitats include the Moulting Lagoon Important Bird Area and Pitt Water–Orielton Lagoon.

== Gallery ==
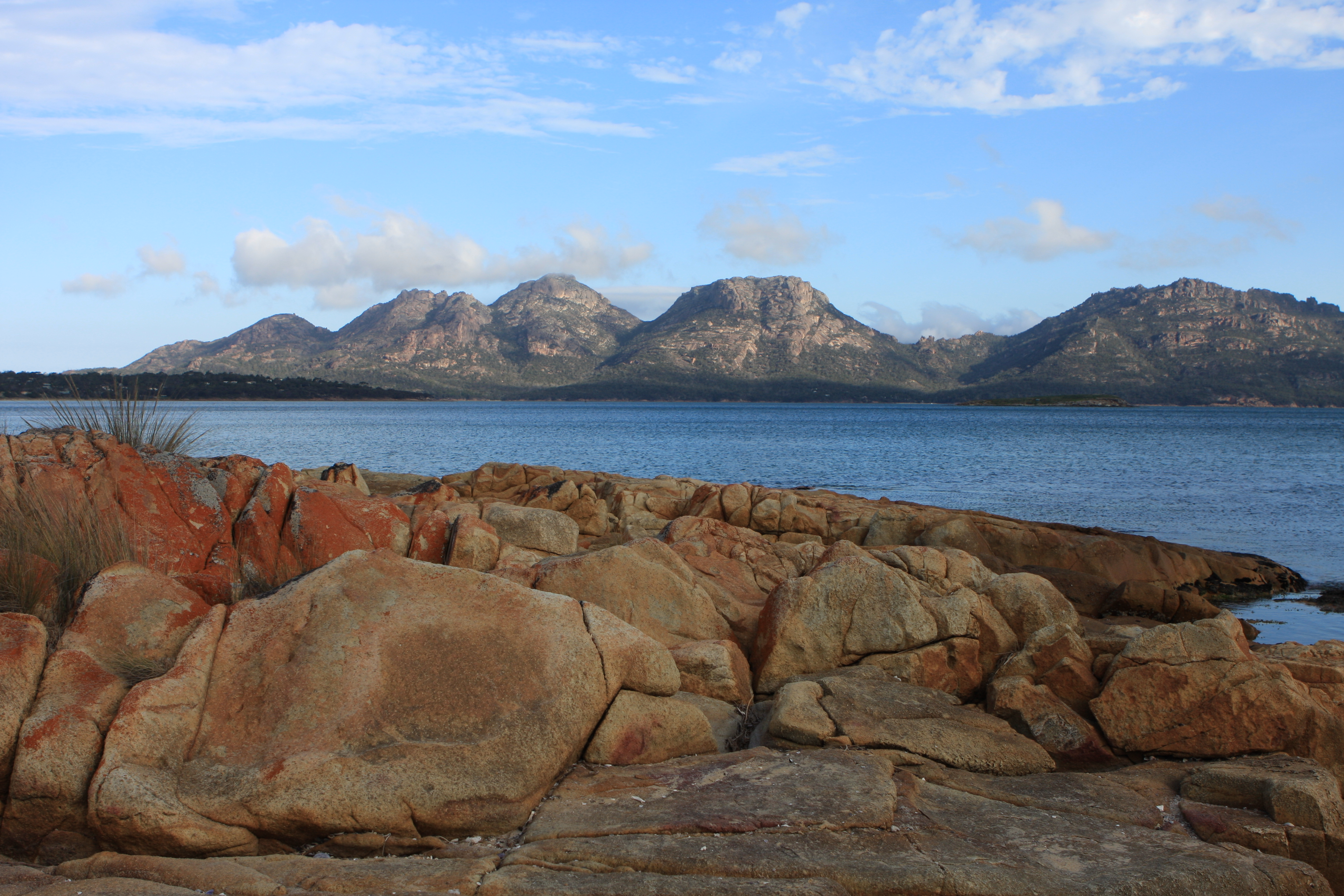
The Hazards from Coles Bay

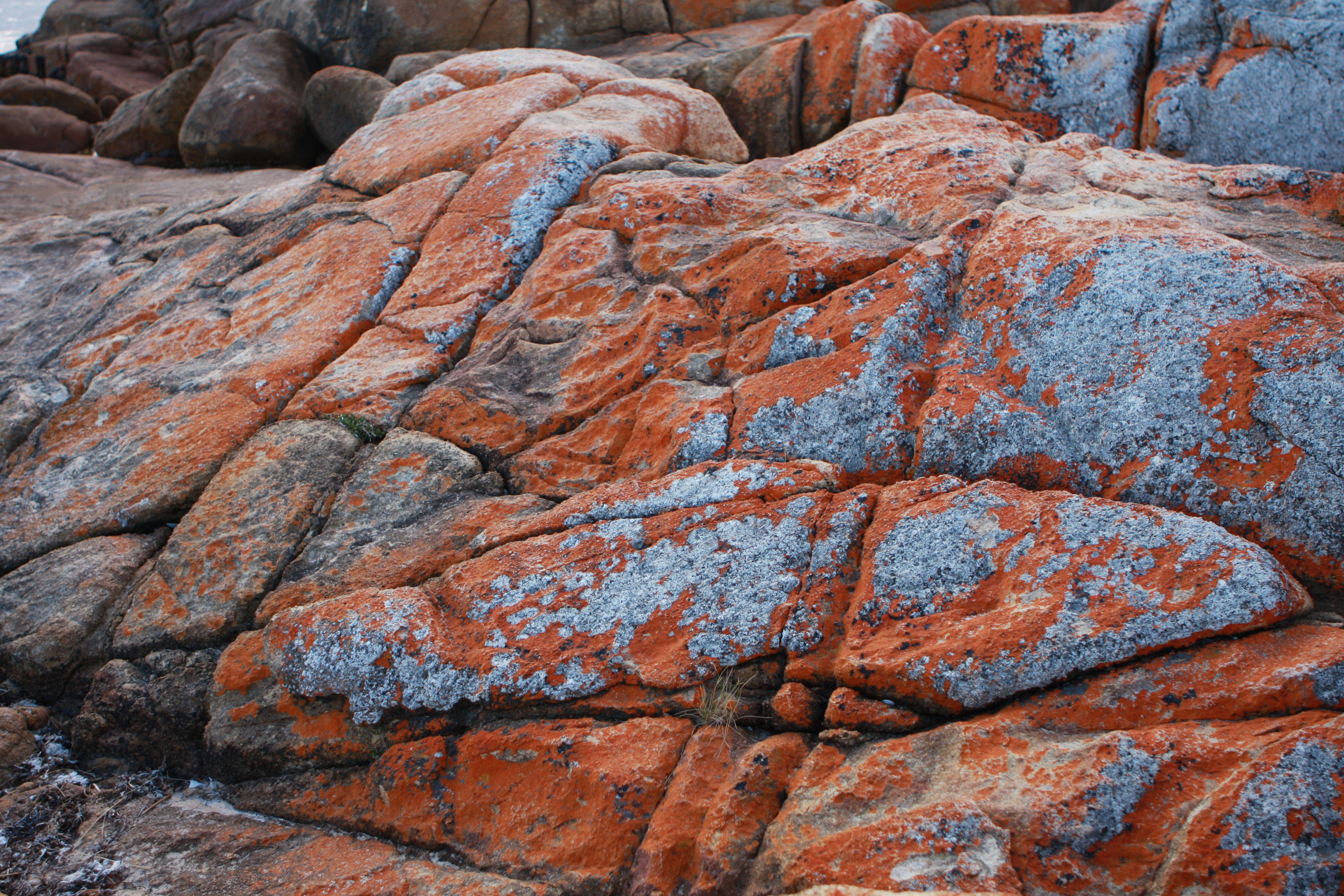
Orange lichen-covered rocks at Coles Bay

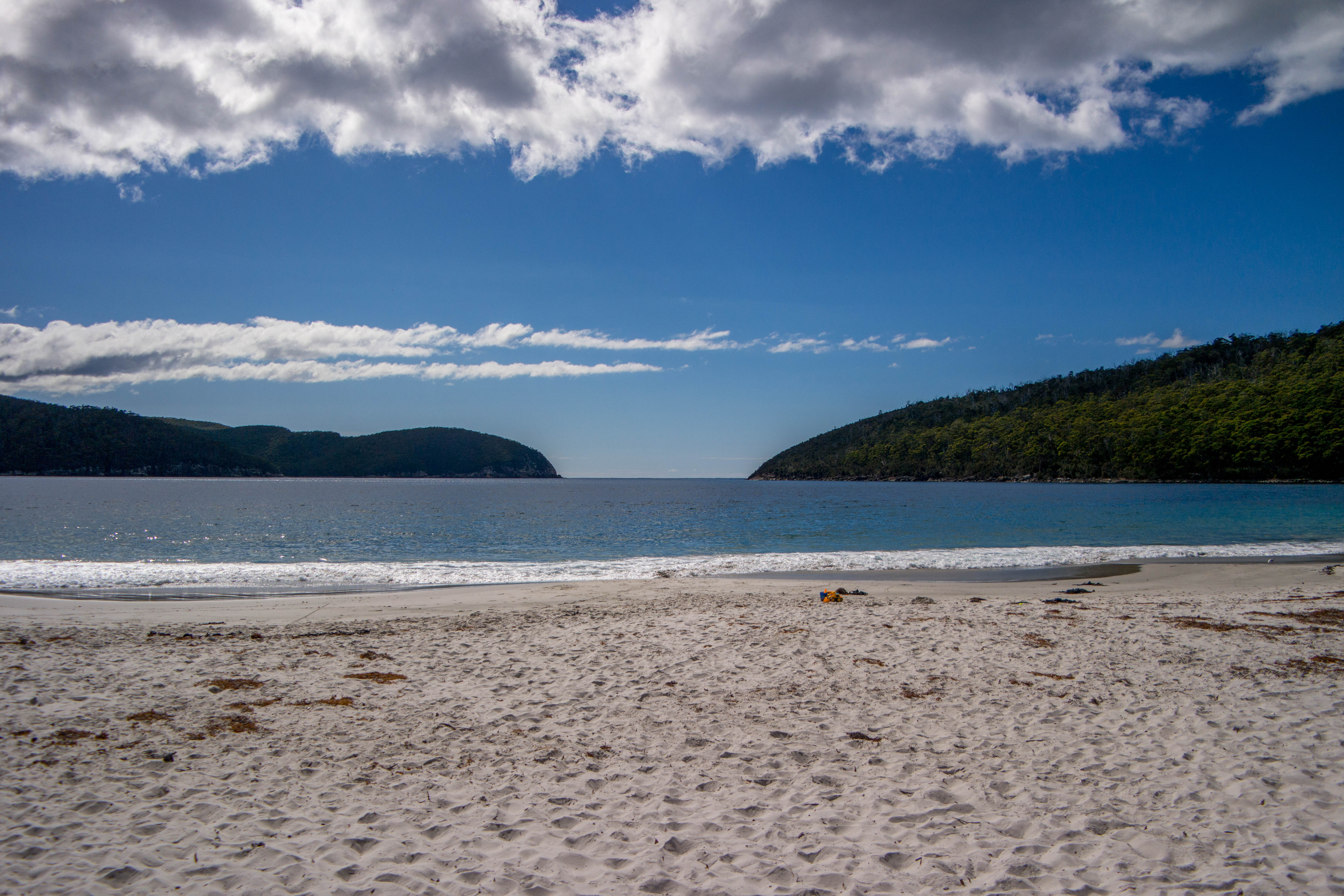
Fortescue Bay at midday

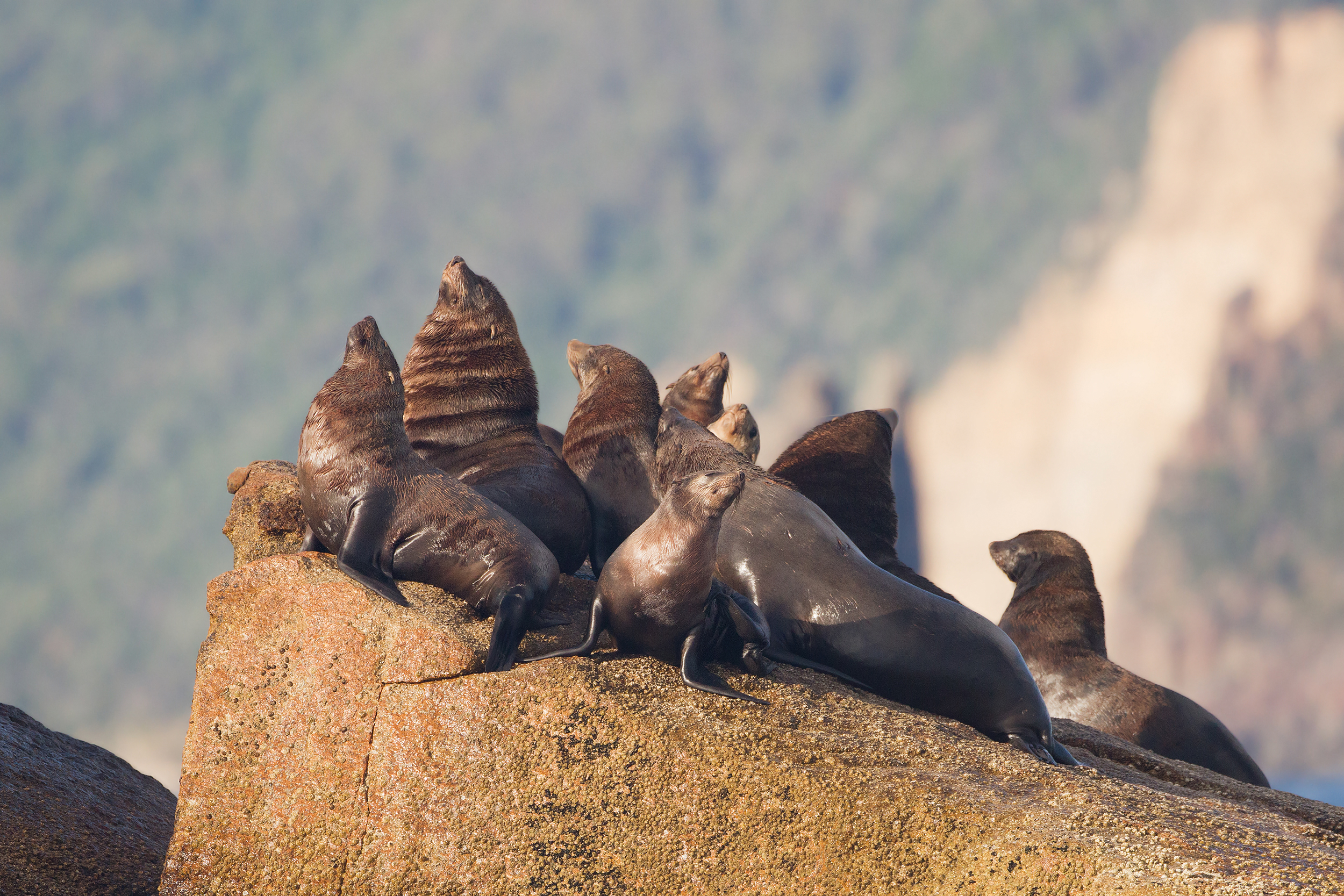
Australian fur seal basking in the morning sun, south-east Tasmania

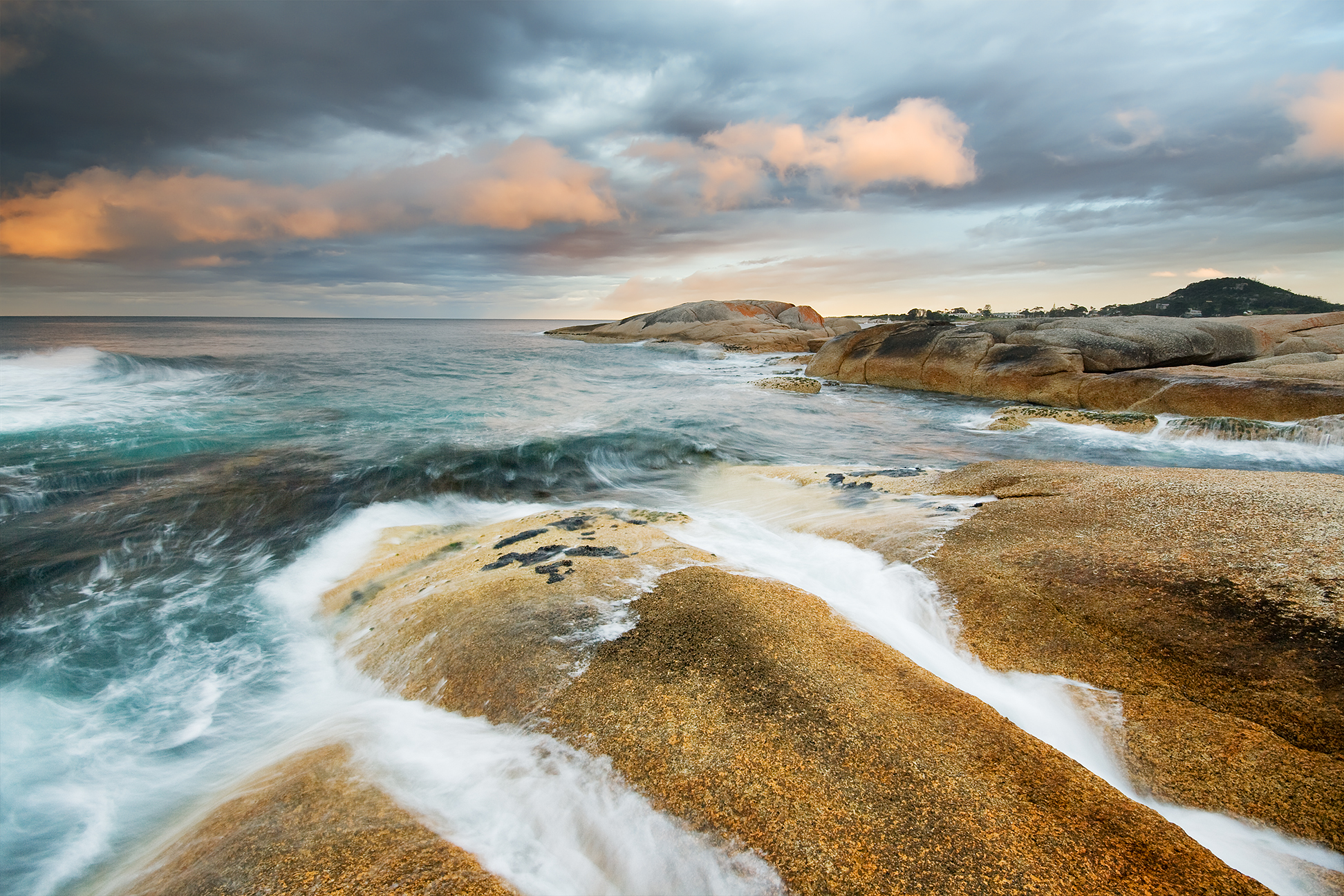
Coastal view at Bicheno

== See also ==
- Climate of Tasmania
- Regions of Tasmania
- Tasmanian South East (Interim Australian bioregion)
- Tourism in Tasmania
