= Île du Nord =

Île du Nord means "north island" in French. It may refer to:

- Ile du Nord, off the shores of Tasmania, Australia
- The north island of the Farquhar Atoll in the Seychelles
- The north island of the Cosmoledo Atoll in the Seychelles
