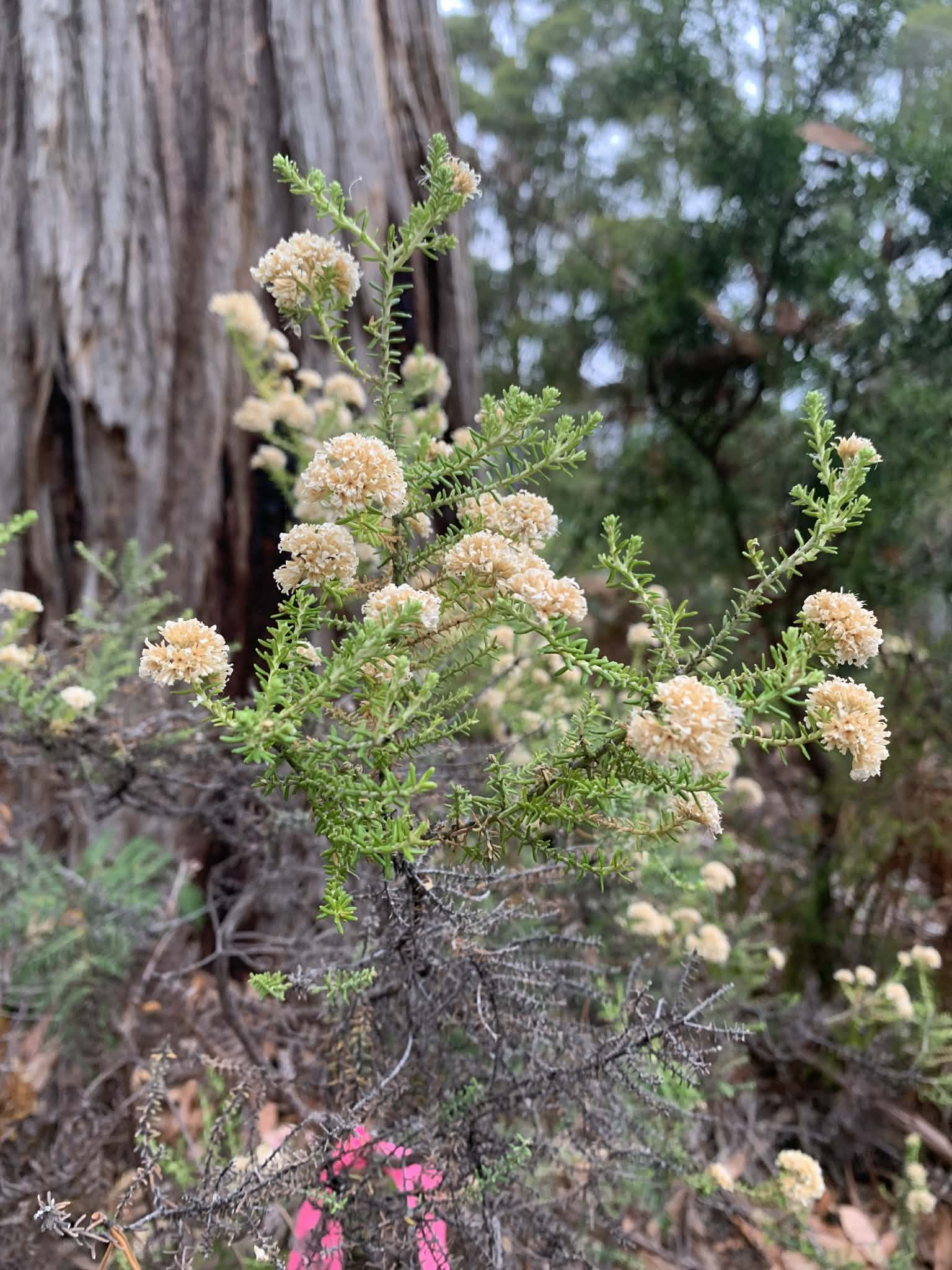

Scientific classification
- Kingdom: Plantae
- Clade: Tracheophytes
- Clade: Angiosperms
- Clade: Eudicots
- Clade: Asterids
- Order: Asterales
- Family: Asteraceae
- Genus: Ozothamnus
- Species: O. floribundus

Binomial name
- Ozothamnus floribundus De Salas & Schmidt-Leb.
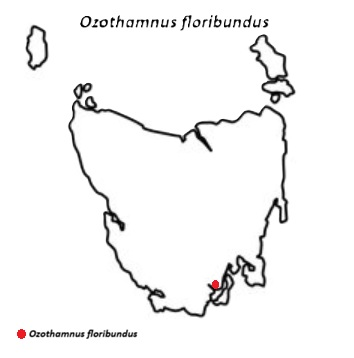
- Distribution of O. floribundus

= Ozothamnus floribundus =

Flowery everlastingbush

Species of flowering plant

Ozothamnus floribundus, commonly known as flowery everlastingbush is a species of flowering plant in the daisy family, Asteraceae. The species is endemic to Tasmania, Australia. It has a highly restricted range, only a single population of 25–30 individuals has been documented, near Cygnet in the state's south-east. It grows as a shrub to 1.2 m tall and is characterised by its abundant inflorescences.

O. floribundus only gained formal recognition as distinct Ozothamnus species in 2018 following genetic, morphological, and ecological analysis. Despite this relatively recent designation as a distinct species, it has been recognised as a morphologically discrete taxon for far longer, with the first documented specimen of the species being collected in 1974.

== Description ==
O. floribundus grows as an erect shrub to approximately 1 m (3.3 ft) tall. Its leaves have a short, linear lamina that grows 3.7–6.3 mm (0.15–0.25 in) long and 0.6–0.9 mm (0.024–0.035 in) wide, margins are entire and recurved, apex is rounded. Younger stems and leaves are covered in a sticky, slightly sweet smelling exudate. The upper (adaxial) side of older leaves are bright green and have a lightly hairy surface, midribs are sunken and the lower (abaxial) side of these leaves are covered in cotton-like hairs. Capitula consist of four to five or occasionally six tube florets which are surrounded by pappery, cylindrical, involucral bracts measuring 4–5 mm (0.16–0.20 in) long. Capitula are arranged together in branched, flat-topped clusters known as a corymbose panicle. As with other species in the genus, the fruit of O. floribundus is an achene. Its achenes are covered are covered in tiny bumps (papillae) and are surrounded by barbed pappus that have a club like (clavate) shape

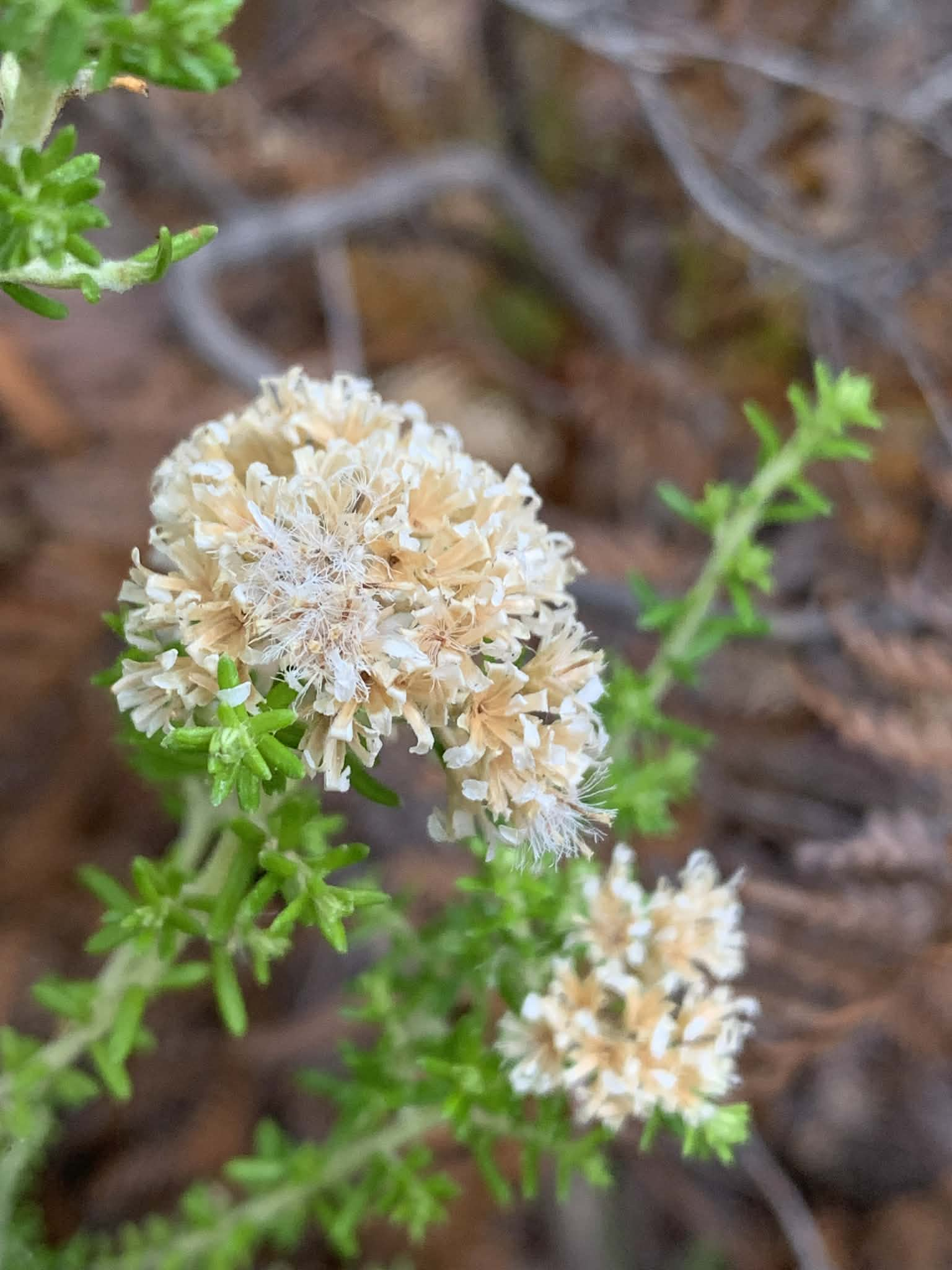
Dried inflorescences, including an achene and pappus

O. floribundus appears similar to O. ericifolius, however they are easily distinguished by habitat as O. ericifolius grows on Tasmania's Central Plateau while O. floribundus grows in a single location in Tasmania's South-east. These two species are additionally distinguishable through leaf and inflorescence morphology, as O. floribundus has narrower leaves and capitula.

== Distribution ==
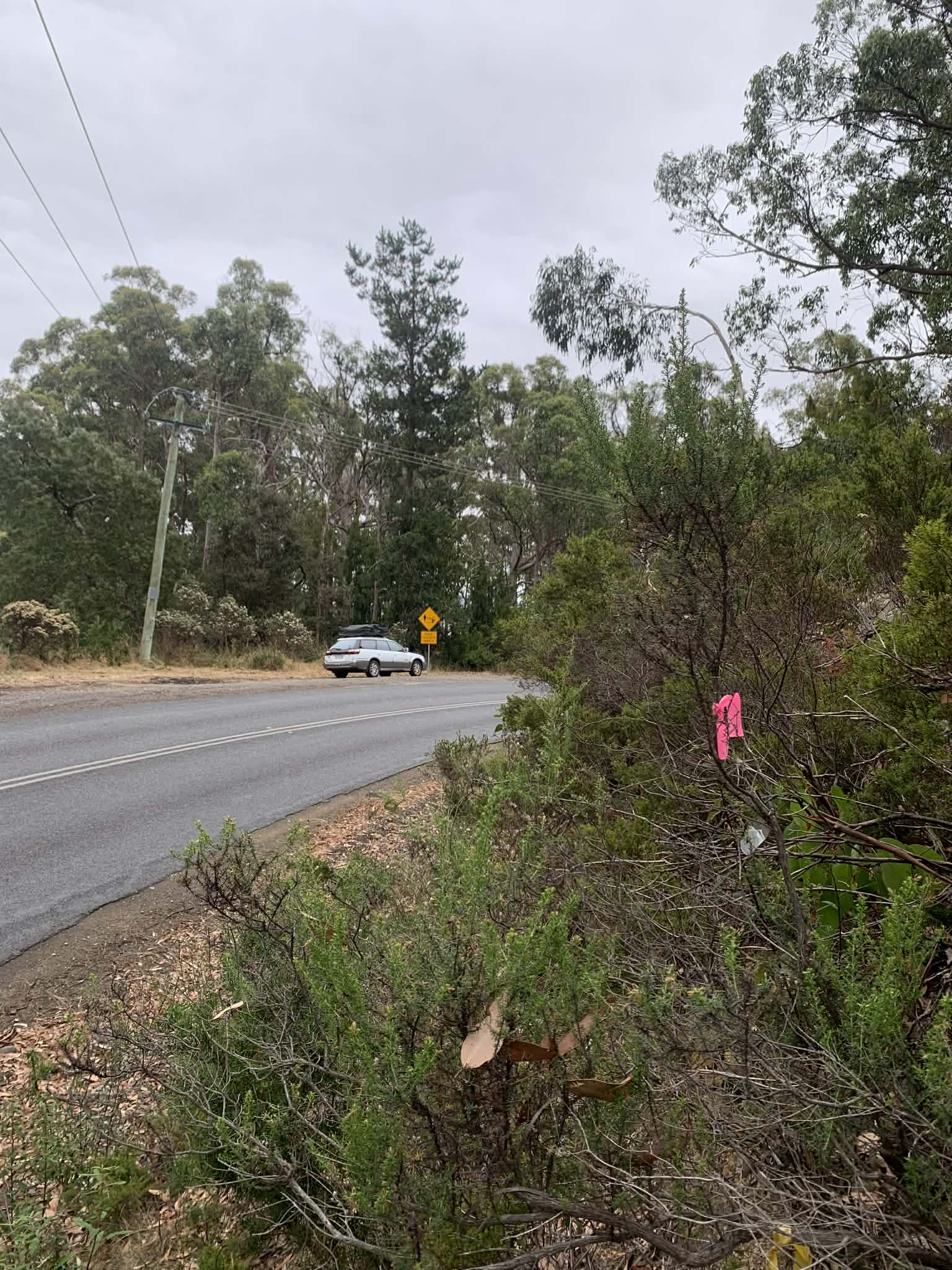
Ozothamnus floribundus shrub growing on roadside cutting along Channel Highway, Tasmania

O. floribundus has a highly restricted distribution, with only one known population which inhabits a small parcel of roadside land (0.9 hectares) beside the Channel Highway at Merchants Hill, near Cygnet, Tasmania. The population is located roughly along a geological boundary between Permian mudstone and Triassic Sandstone and as such the geological substrate has been characterised as both sandstone and mudstone including weathered dolerite in different publications. The site is characterised as Eucalyptus obliqua dry schlerophyll forest and is situated between 125 and 140 m (410 and 460 ft) above sea level.

== Taxonomy ==
O. floribundus was formally described as a species in 2018 by Miguel De Salas and Alexander N. Schmidt-Lebuhn. Prior to 2018, O. floribundus was often referred to interchangeably as one of three Ozothamnus species, O. ledifolius, O. purpurascens and O. ericifolius. Despite this, O. floribundus has long been identified as a morphologically distinct taxon, with the first specimen of the species being collected from Merchants Hill in 1974. Genetic analysis of O. floribundus against the three above mentioned species as well as O. reflexus and O. buchananii identified O. floribundus as being closely related to O. ericifolius. However, morphological and environmental analyses found sufficient difference in environmental niches and physical characteristics to define O. floribundus as a separate species

Genetic analysis suggested that the species likely originated as a hybrid between O. ericifolius and O. reflexus. However, due to its morphological stability and distinct habitat to its parent species, it is defined as a distinct species and not a hybrid species.

== Etymology ==
The genus Ozothamnus derives its name from the Greek words ozo, meaning 'to smell' and thamnos, meaning 'shrub', as a result of the strong odour that the leaves of many species within the genus have. Species within the genus often contain the name 'everlasting bush' due to the persistence of flowers on the plant for a long time following flowering. For example. O. ledifolius has the common name 'mountain everlasting bush' due to it inhabiting montane environments.

O. floribundus derives its name from the Latin words flori, meaning flower, and bundus, meaning abundant, due to being densely covered in inflorescences during flowering. Hence the species common name, 'flowery everlastingbush'.

== Ecology ==
O. floribundus is assumed to be an obligate seeder, meaning it cannot regenerate following fire and must regrow from seed stored within the soil. Although this has not been observed in the species directly, many similar species within the genus have this trait, it has therefore been theorised to be a trait of this species as well. Seeds of the species are short-lived, meaning they are only able to sprout for a short period of time following dispersal. Fire based disturbance likely opens a niche for the species to recruit; however, this has not been directly observed as the Merchant Hill site has remained unburned since before the 1967 Tasmanian bushfires.

Rainfall at the Merchant Hill site averages approximately 700 mm/year, similar to other areas on Tasmania's drier east coast. The leaf morphology of O. floribundus may aid the species in tolerating dry periods. The hairy lower (abaxial) surface of the leaf likely limits unwanted water loss during transpiration by creating a humid, windless microclimate around the leaves stomata.

== Conservation ==
O. floribundus is currently listed as endangered under the Threatened Species Protection Act 1995 (Tas). The species met the following criteria under the legislation in order to be listed: A total population of less than 250 individuals and a total habitat range of less than 1 hectare (2.5 acres). As of 2019, O. floribundus occupied less than 0.1 hectares (0.25 acres) and had a population of 25-30 individuals. The species is currently not federally listed under the Environment Protection and Biodiversity Conservation Act 1999 (Cth). A number of threats exist to the continued survival of the species, including fire, drought and invasive species

=== Fire ===
Obligate seeders, like O. floribundus, are threatened by increased fire frequency. Following a disturbance by fire, obligate seeders must reach sexual maturity and begin producing seed before fire reoccurs, otherwise a soil seed bank may not exist for post-fire regeneration. Therefore, a fire frequency at the Merchants hill site that exceeds the species ability to reach maturity could lead to extinction of the species.

=== Drought ===
Drought induced mortality has previously been observed in other lowland species of the genus. Due to the species extremely low population, any losses due to drought could have adverse impacts on future recruitment of the species, as the loss of a single individual represents a large percentage loss of the total population.

=== Invasive species ===
Exotic/invasive species also pose a significant threat to the continued survival of O. floribundus. Monterey pines (Pinus radiata) present at the site have the potential to alter soil chemistry and alter ground cover through thick mats of pine needles, limiting the recruitment of O. floribundus. Meanwhile, the Spanish heath (Erica lusitanica) which is not yet present at the site but is found in nearby areas, has the potential to outcompete O. floribundus resulting in the reduction or extinction of the population.
