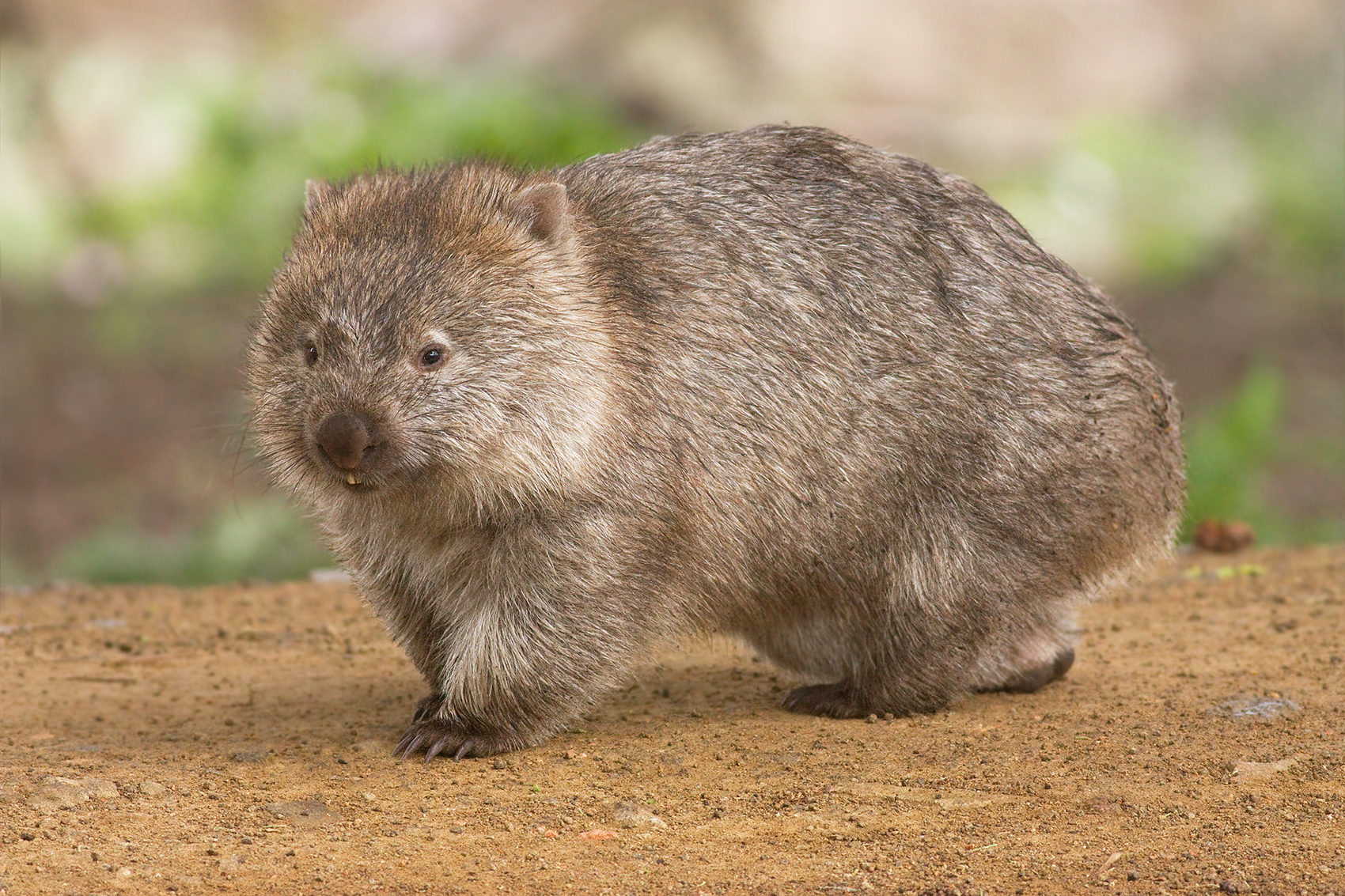
- Vombatus ursinus ursinus, Maria Island, Tasmania

Conservation status
- Least Concern (IUCN 3.1)

Scientific classification
- Kingdom: Animalia
- Phylum: Chordata
- Class: Mammalia
- Infraclass: Marsupialia
- Order: Diprotodontia
- Family: Vombatidae
- Genus: Vombatus
- Species: V. ursinus

Binomial name
- Vombatus ursinus (Shaw, 1800)
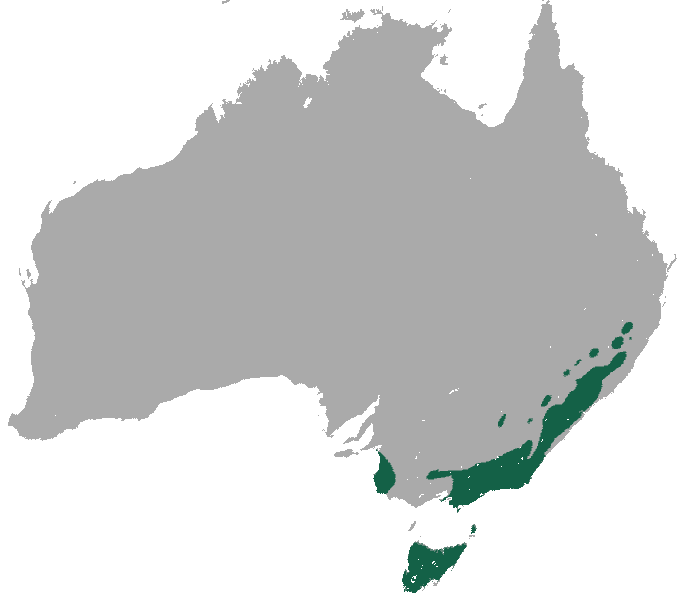
- Common wombat range

Synonyms
- Reference: Wombatus fossor; Phascolomis wombat; Phascolomis vombatus; Phascolomys platyrhinus; Phascolomys fuscus; Phascolomys mitchellii; Phascolomys niger; Phascolomys setosus; Phascolomys assimilis

= Common wombat =

Species of marsupial

The common wombat (Vombatus ursinus), also known as a bare-nosed wombat, is a marsupial, one of three extant species of wombats and the sole extant member of the genus Vombatus. It has three subspecies: Vombatus ursinus hirsutus, found on the Australian mainland; Vombatus ursinus tasmaniensis (Tasmanian wombat), found in Tasmania; and Vombatus ursinus ursinus (Bass Strait wombat), found on Flinders Island and Maria Island in the Bass Strait.

The mainland subspecies is the largest of the three, with its largest specimens measuring up to 1.2 m (3 ft 11 in) and 35 kg (77 lb). The common wombat is herbivorous, mainly nocturnal, and lives in burrows. Being a marsupial, its joeys inhabit a pouch on the mother for around five months after birth.

== Taxonomy ==
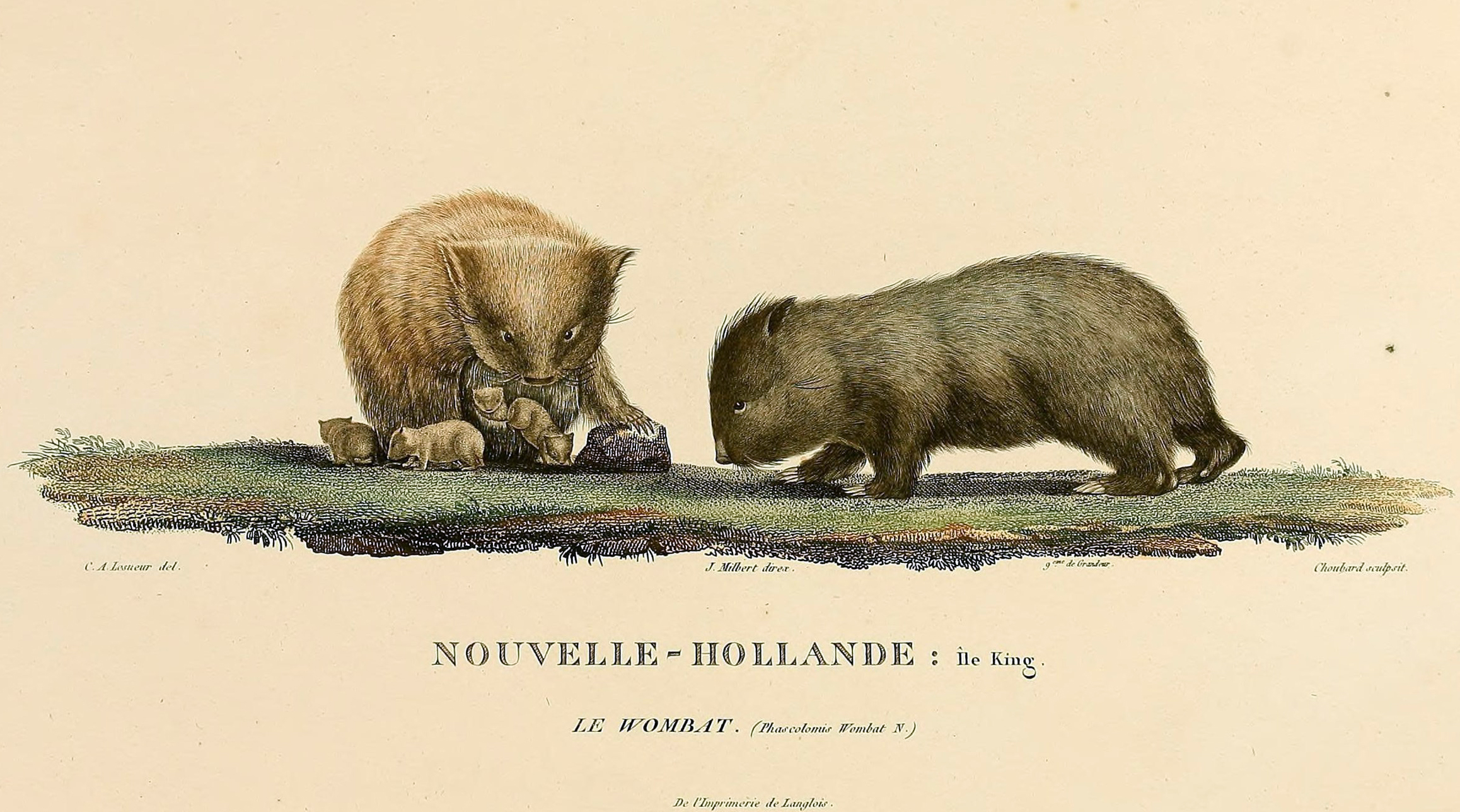
An 1807 illustration of the now-extinct wombats of King Island (Note: Probably the Bass Strait subspecies.)

The common wombat was first described by George Shaw in 1800.

There are three extant subspecies of the common wombat, confirmed in 2019:

- Bass Strait (common) wombat, also written "Common Wombat (Bass Strait)" or "Bass Strait wombat" (V. u. ursinus), the nominate form, was once found throughout the Bass Strait Islands, but is now restricted to Flinders Island to the north of Tasmania, and to Maria Island to the east of Tasmania where it was introduced. Its population was estimated at 74,000 in 2023.
- Hirsute wombat (V. u. hirsutus) is found on the Australian mainland.
- Tasmanian wombat (V. u. tasmaniensis) is found in Tasmania. It is smaller than V. u. hirsutus. Its population was estimated at 840,000 in 2023.

Hackett's wombat (V. hacketti) is an extinct species of genus Vombatus, inhabiting the southwestern part of Australia. Being around the same size as V. ursinus, with an average weight of 30 kg (66 lb), V. hacketti went extinct at the end of the Late Pleistocene, in the Quaternary extinction event.

== Description ==
Common wombats are sturdy and built close to the ground. They have small ears and eyes, and a large bald nose. Their fur is thick and coarse and its colour varies from light brown to grey and black. The Flinders Island wombat is the smallest of the three subspecies at around 75 cm (30 in) in length, while the Tasmanian wombat averages 85 cm (33 in) and a weight of 20 kg (44 lb). The largest of the three, the mainland species, are around 1 m (3 ft 3 in) long and weigh 27 kg (60 lb) on average. Larger specimens can reach 1.2 m (3 ft 11 in) and 35 kg (77 lb).

They have short, strong legs with long claws and are very efficient diggers. One mark of distinction from all other marsupials is that the wombat has a single pair of upper and lower incisors, which never stop growing.

== Distribution and habitat ==
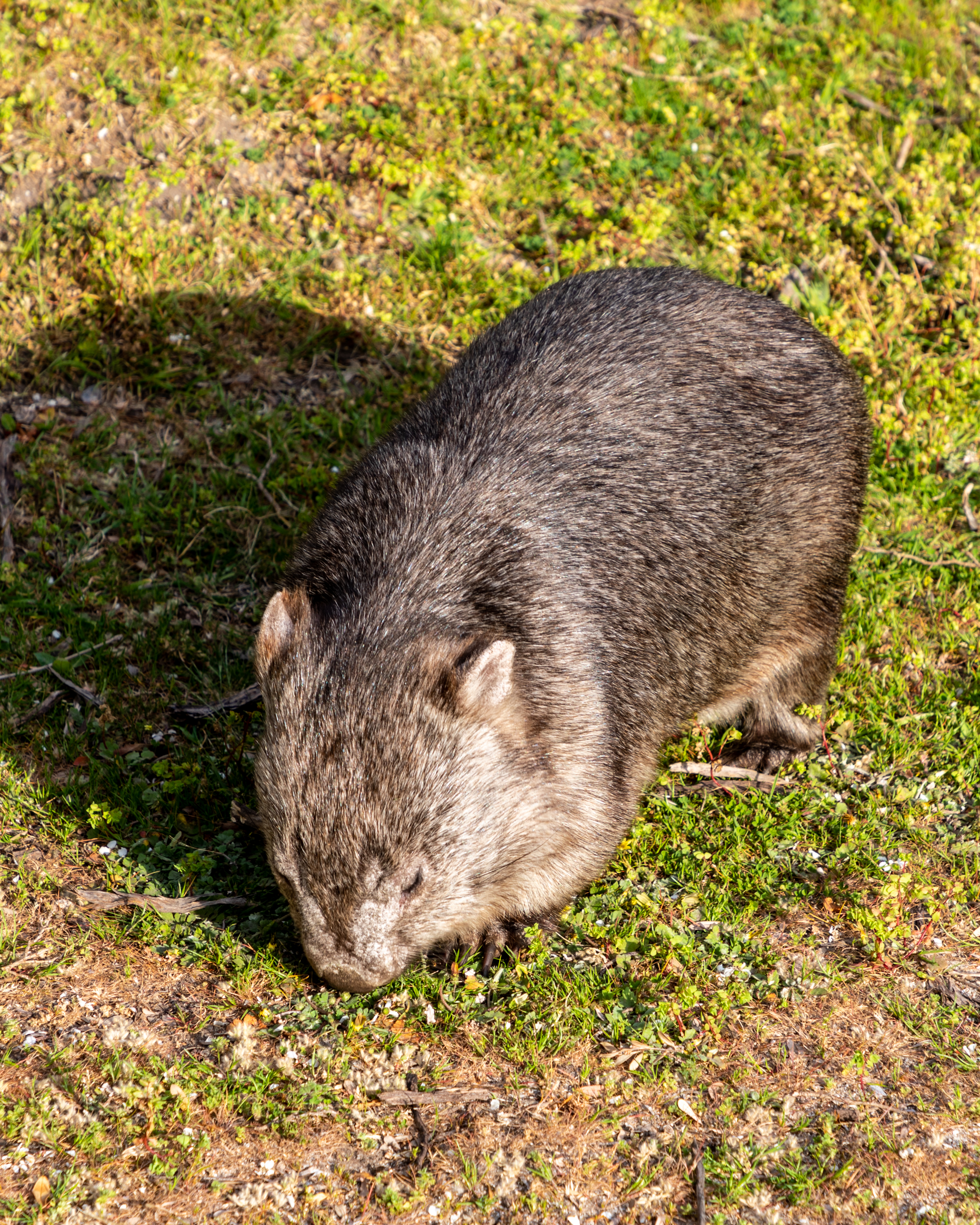
A hirsute wombat (V. u. hirsutus) at Wilsons Promontory. Larger than the other subspecies, these wombats are widely distributed in southern and eastern parts of the Australian mainland

Scientists estimate that around 1.3 million common wombats remain in the wild, more than two thirds of are restricted to islands including Tasmania though numbers are declining nationally.

Common wombats are widespread in the cooler and better-watered parts of southern and eastern Australia, including Tasmania and Victoria, and in mountain districts as far north as southern Queensland. In Tasmania, their preference is heathland, coastal scrub, and open forest. They can be found at any elevation in the south of their range, but in the north of their range are only found in higher, more mountainous areas. They may be found in a variety of habitats including rainforest, eucalyptus forest, woodland, alpine grassland, and coastal areas. In some regions, they have adapted to farmland and can be seen grazing in open fields with cattle and sheep.

Human activity has caused its distribution and population to shrink by more than half since European settlement. Its former distribution extended from South Australia's Limestone Coast to throughout Victoria, except for the desert areas of the north west, and the Great Dividing Range in New South Wales and South East Queensland. The most substantial impact being the result of a $1 bounty operating in Victoria between 1926-1966 declaring them an agricultural pest due to their burrowing and foraging. Encouraging landowners to eliminate them caused local extirpation of the species in much of its former range.

The species had no protection in Victoria until 2020. It is still hunted as a pest under license there and in the Australian Capital Territory resulting in as many as 2,482 a year being culled nationally. Mainland populations are now largely fragmented and isolated to remote pockets in most states. The species is recognised as protected in South Australia under the National Parks and Wildlife Act 1972, in Queensland under the Nature Conservation Act 1992 and in New South Wales under the NSW Biodiversity Conservation Act 2016.

== Behaviour ==
Common wombats have been described as ecological engineers, as their burrow building results in soil turnover and aeration, which assists plant growth, and provides habitat for a range of invertebrate and vertebrate species.

Common wombats are a solitary, territorial species, with each wombat having an established range in which it lives and feeds. In this area, they dig a tunnel system, with tunnels ranging from 2–20 m (6 ft 7 in – 65 ft 7 in) in length, along with many side tunnels, and often more than one entrance. More than one wombat may build their nest, made from sticks, leaves, and grasses, in one burrow.

A wide range of other animals are known to make use of wombat burrows including reptiles, rodents, rabbits, echidnas, wallabies, birds and koalas. Wombats are usually fairly tolerant of non-threatening species, and have a number of burrows that they can occupy. They typically switch the burrow that they sleep in every 1–9 days.

Many wombats can live in the same burrow, and wombats normally live in the same burrow for their whole lifespan unless the wombat is forced out of the burrow by farmers or other animal species, or unless the burrow is destroyed. Often nocturnal, the common wombat does come out during the day in cooler weather, such as in early morning or late afternoon.

=== Diet ===
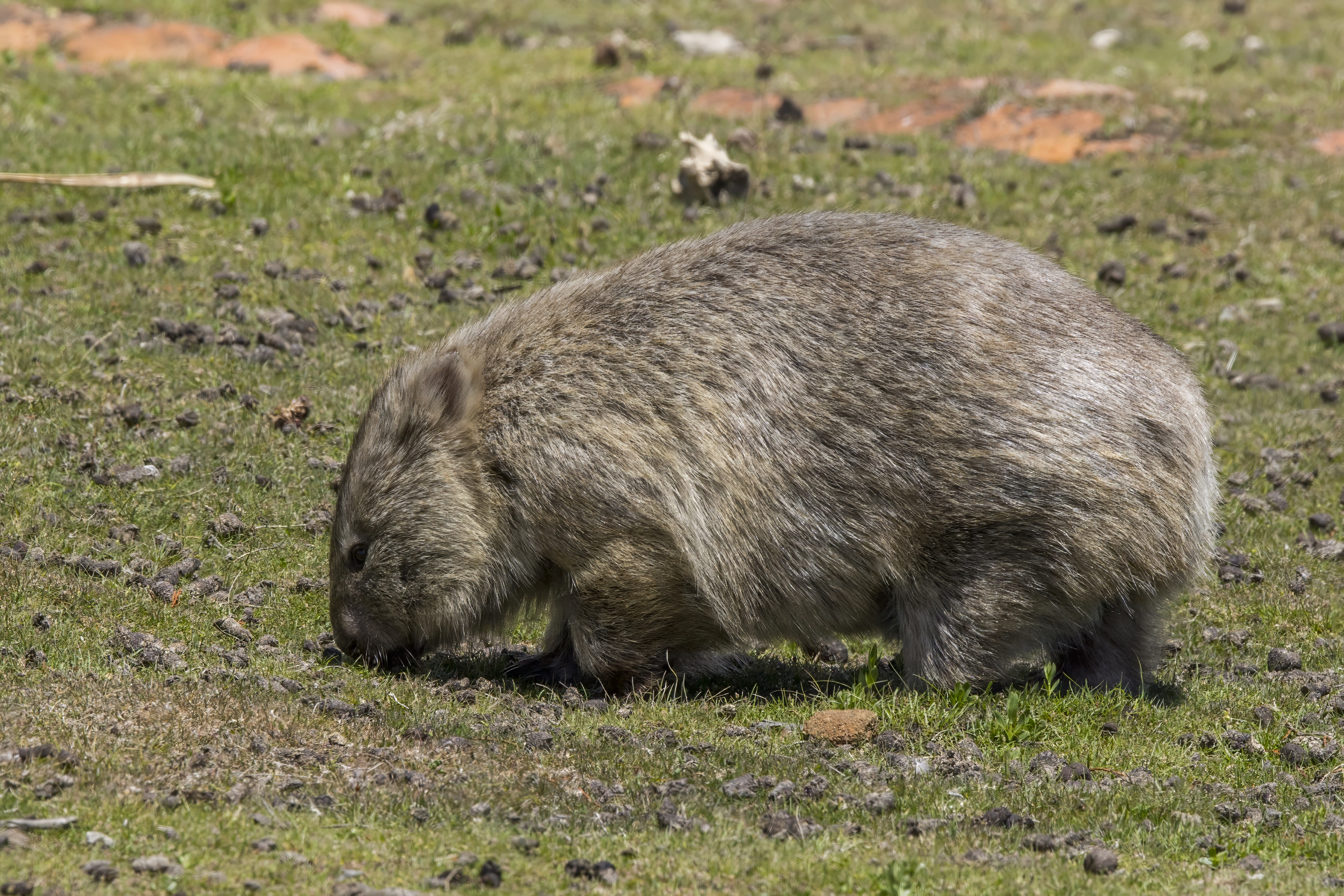
Grazing on Maria Island, Tasmania

Common wombats are herbivorous, subsisting on grass, snow tussocks, and other plant materials. Foraging is usually done during the night. They are the only marsupial in the world whose teeth constantly grow. Due to the underlying enamel structure of the teeth, the continuously growing teeth maintain a self-sharpening ridge which allows easier grazing of the diet consisting of mainly native grasses. Captive wombats are also fed a range of vegetables.

Their dung is cube-shaped.

=== Breeding ===
The common wombat breeds mainly in winter. It can breed every two years and produce a single joey. Wombats appear to mate side-ways The gestation period is about 20–30 days, and the young remain in the pouch for five months. When leaving the pouch, they weigh between 3.5 and 6.5 kg (7.7 and 14.3 lb). The joey is weaned around 12 to 15 months of age, and is usually independent at 18 months of age. Wombats have an average lifespan of 15 years in the wild and 20 years in captivity.

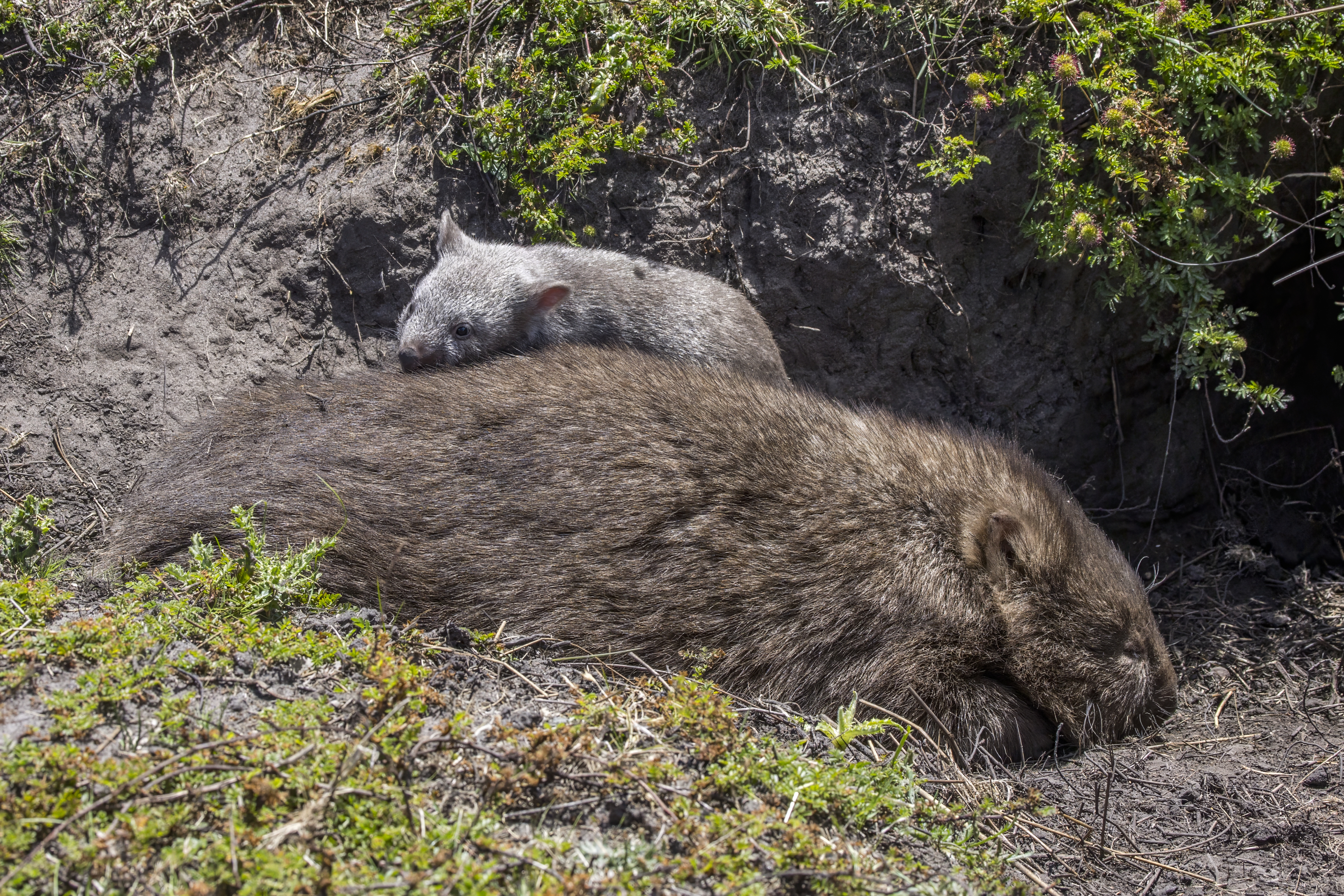
A female with a joey

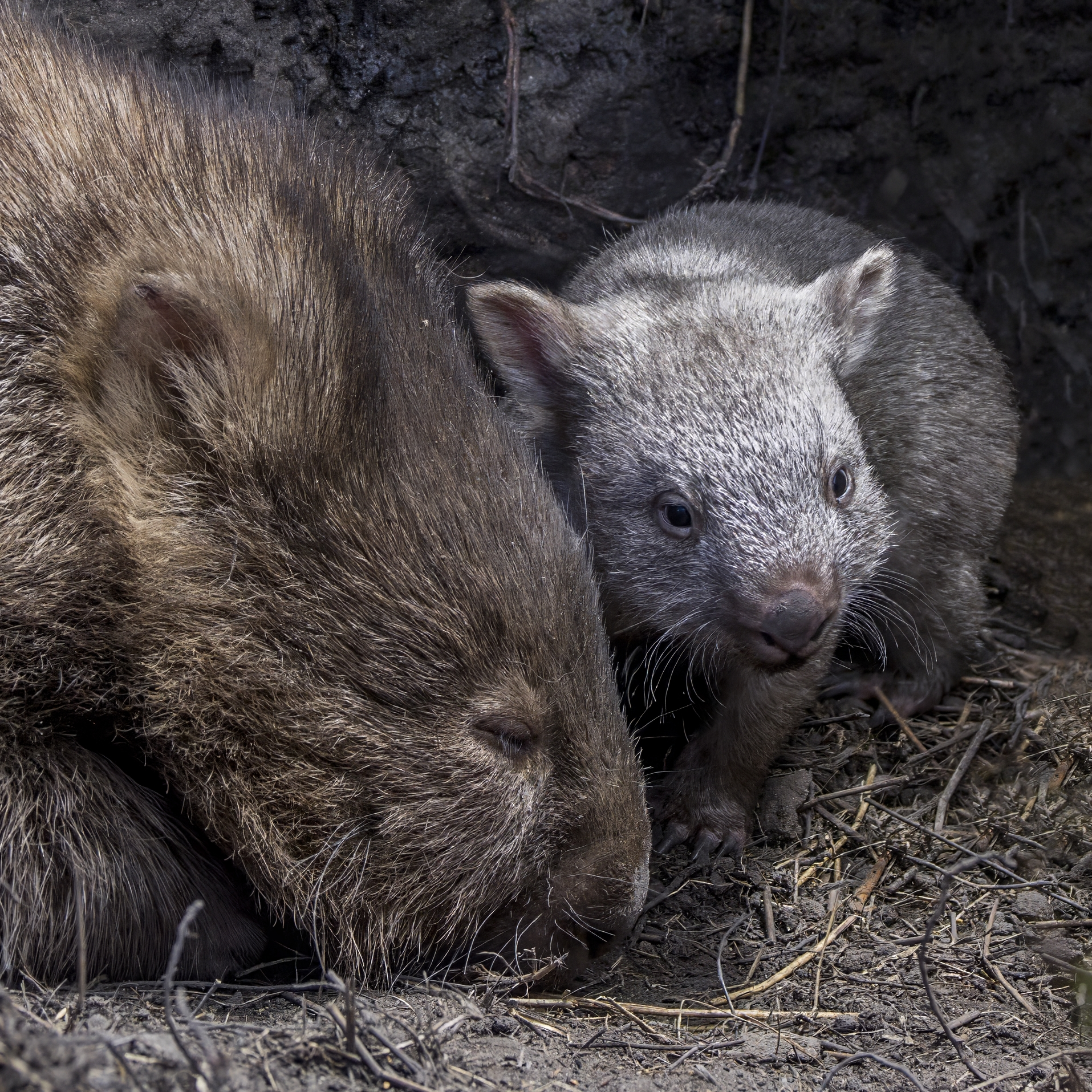
Outside a burrow

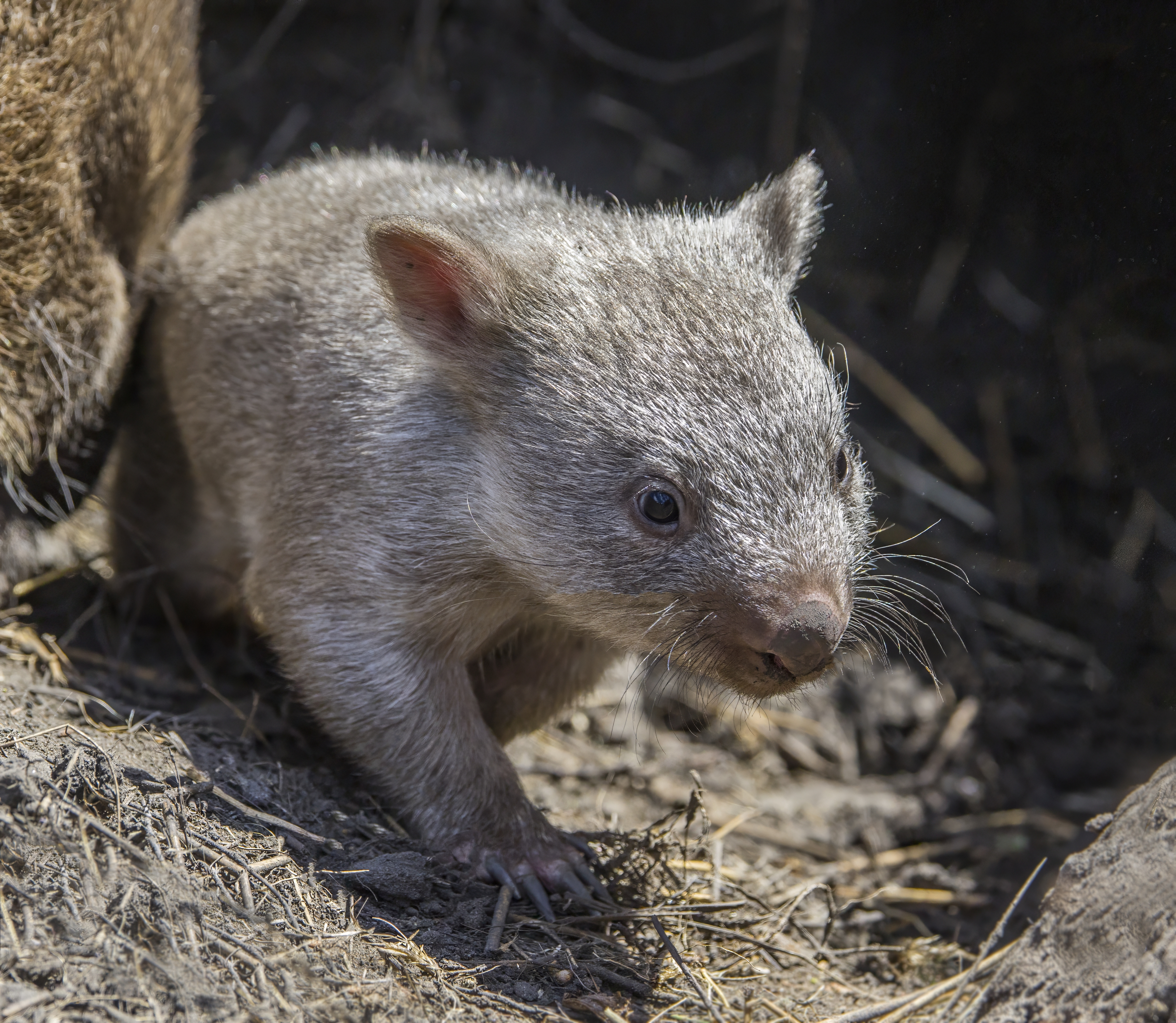
A joey on Maria Island

=== Threats ===
Whilst bare-nosed wombats are listed as Least Concern by the IUCN, they remain threatened largely due to anthropomorphic factors including habitat reduction, roadkill and sarcoptic mange. Sarcoptic mange is prevalent in the population and remains the most problematic of issues facing bare-nosed wombats, with wildlife carers regularly treating wombats in the field with low-risk moxidectin.

Wombats have also been reported to harbour a range of parasites, including ticks and associated pathogens.

Its main predators are quolls, Tasmanian devils, dingos and eagles.

There was a significant increase in overall wombat counts throughout Tasmania between 1985 and 2019 although numbers decreased in the last 10 years of that period in the west Tamar area.
