= National Portland Cement Limited tramway =

Defunct industrial tramway on east coast of Tasmania, Australia

The National Portland Cement Limited tramway was a 2ft gauge rail line that served the cement works at Darlington on Maria Island in Tasmania from 1923 to July 1930.

The line connected three quarries (one at Fossil Cliffs on the east coast of the island and two smaller quarries further inland) with both the cement works at Darlington and the new jetty built specifically for the cement works. The tramway was used to bring limestone from the quarries to the works, coal from the jetty to the powerplant and cement kiln, and to take bagged cement from the works to the jetty for shipping. At least 32 4-wheel side-tipping hopper wagons were used.

Two locomotives were used on the line:

Builder	Type	Date	Works Number	Notes
Hudswell Clarke	0-4-0WT	1922	1423	Sold in 1934 to Corrimal Colliery, currently in museum in NSW.
Robert Hudson	4wPM	1924	X1230	Supplied through Knox, Schlapp & Co. Melbourne. Cost £410. Powered by a Fordson tractor power unit. Believe scrapped. Photo at https://libraries.tas.gov.au/Digital/NS479-1-108

The cement works proved unprofitable due to poor quality limestone, transport costs from the island, and the economic effects of the Great Depression. It closed in July 1930 and most of the equipment was shipped to Port Fairy in Victoria.
