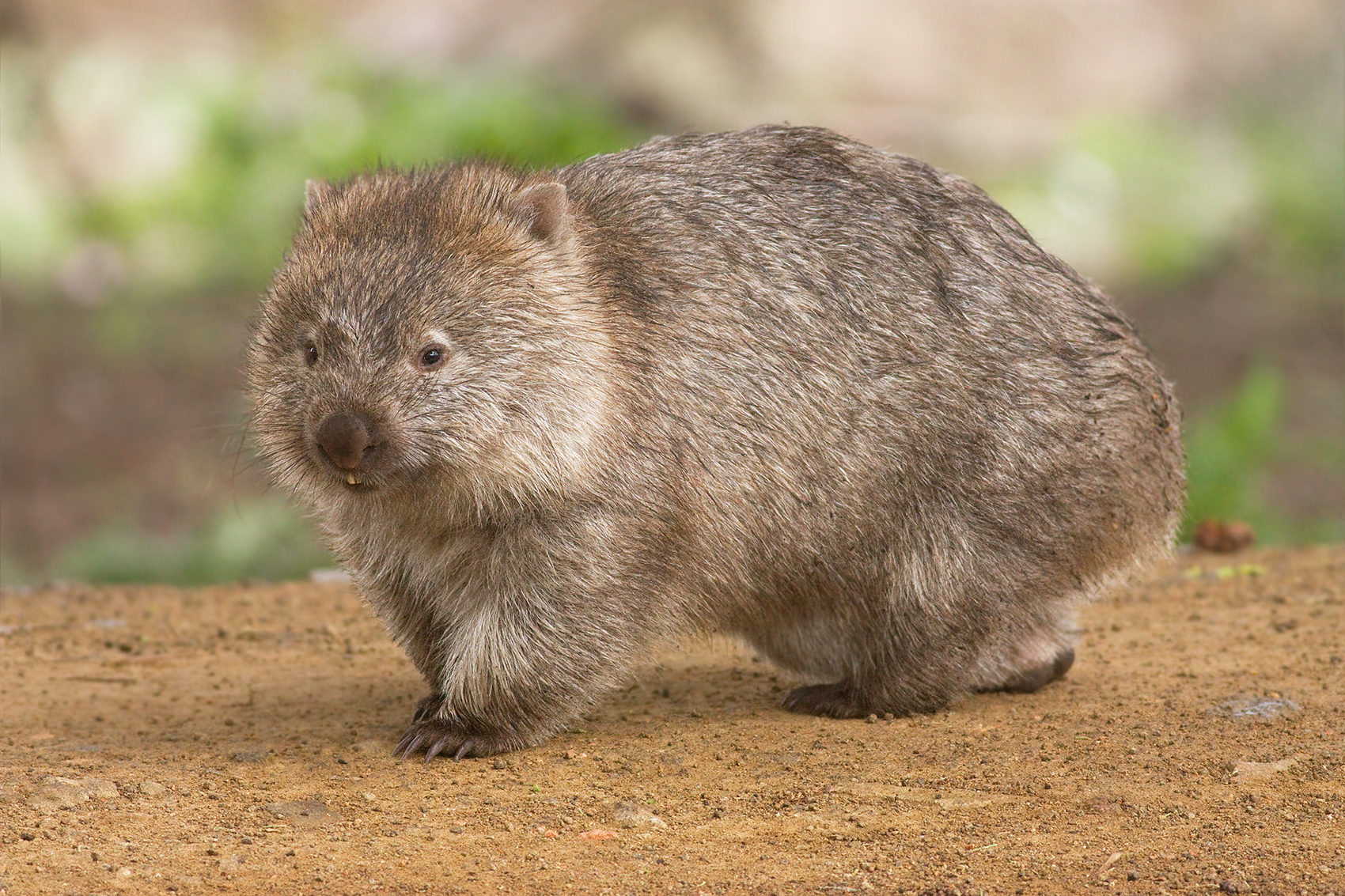
- Common wombat (Vombatus ursinus)

Scientific classification
- Domain: Eukaryota
- Kingdom: Animalia
- Phylum: Chordata
- Class: Mammalia
- Infraclass: Marsupialia
- Order: Diprotodontia
- Family: Vombatidae
- Genus: Vombatus; É. Geoffroy, 1803

Type species
- Vombatus ursinus Shaw, 1800

= Vombatus =

Genus of mammals

Vombatus is a genus of marsupial that contains a single living species, the common wombat (Vombatus ursinus).

The recently extinct Hackett's wombat (Vombatus hacketti) is also a member of this genus.

Image	Scientific name	Distribution
Borris the wombat at Lone Pine Koala Sanctuary	Vombatus ursinus, common wombat	Common wombat distribution
	†Vombatus hacketti, Hackett's wombat	Southwest Australia
