= Mercury Passage =

Waterway separating Maria Island from Tasmania

- Location in Tasmania
- Location: East Coast Tasmania
- Coordinates: 42°40′S 148°05′E
- Type: Passage
- Etymology: Named for HMS Mercury
- Primary outflows: Tasman Sea
- Ocean/sea sources: South Pacific Ocean
- Basin countries: Australia
- Islands: Maria Island
- Settlements: Orford, Triabunna

The Mercury Passage is a waterway located on the east coast of Tasmania, Australia, separating Maria Island from the Tasmanian mainland. The passage connects to the Tasman Sea and is known for its rich marine ecosystems, scenic coastal landscapes, and significance to Tasmania's aquaculture and tourism industries.

== History ==
The Mercury Passage was named after HMS Mercury (1807), a British ship that surveyed parts of Tasmania's east coast during the early 19th century. The passage has historically been an important route for shipping and fishing activities. It was also home to several whaling stations during the early 19th century, reflecting the region's role in Tasmania's maritime history.

The Indigenous peoples of the area, including the Paredarerme people, used the Mercury Passage for fishing and transportation long before European settlement. Their connection to the region is reflected in the archaeological sites found on the surrounding shores and Maria Island.

== Geography and environment ==
The Mercury Passage runs approximately north–south, with the Tasmanian mainland to the west and Maria Island to the east. It is characterized by clean, temperate waters, making it a habitat for diverse marine life, including scallops, lobsters, and various fish species. The area is a popular spot for recreational fishing, diving, and sailing.

In recent years, the Mercury Passage has been a focus for aquaculture development. The establishment of salmon farms, particularly near Okehampton Bay, has brought economic benefits but also environmental and community concerns, including debates over the impact on water quality and local ecosystems.

== Tourism ==
The Mercury Passage is a gateway to Maria Island, a popular destination for tourists seeking wildlife, historical sites, and natural beauty. Ferries from Triabunna regularly cross the passage, connecting visitors to Maria Island National Park. The passage is also a draw for recreational activities such as boating, kayaking, and whale watching.

== See also ==
Maria Island National Park
