= Vombatus hacketti =

Vombatus hacketti Temporal range: Late Pleistocene

Scientific classification
- Domain: Eukaryota
- Kingdom: Animalia
- Phylum: Chordata
- Class: Mammalia
- Infraclass: Marsupialia
- Order: Diprotodontia
- Family: Vombatidae
- Genus: Vombatus
- Species: †V. hacketti

Binomial name
- †Vombatus hacketti Glauert, 1910

Synonyms
- Phascolomys hacketti

Extinct species of wombat

Vombatus hacketti, Hackett's wombat, is an extinct species of wombat that lived in Southwest Australia during the Late Pleistocene. It survived until very recently, going extinct between 10,000 and 20,000 BP.

== Description ==
Fossils of this species were first found in Mammoth Cave. Its skull was larger than that of the common wombat, indicating it grew to larger sizes.

Hackett's wombat survived longer than most other prehistoric Australian fauna. This may indicate that the arrival of humans may have played a greater role in its extinction, rather than just climate change.
