= Ile du Nord =

Island in Tasmania, Australia

- Location within Tasmania

Geography
- Location: East coast of Tasmania
- Coordinates: 42°33′36″S 148°03′00″E
- Archipelago: Maria Island Group
- Adjacent to: Tasman Sea
- Area: 10 ha (25 acres)

Administration
- Australia
- State: Tasmania
- Local government area: Glamorgan Spring Bay Council

Additional information
- Time zone: AEST (UTC+10)
  - Summer (DST): AEDT (UTC+11)
- Maria Island National Park

The Ile du Nord, part of the Maria Island Group, is a small granite island with an area of approximately 10 hectares (25 acres) lying close to the eastern coast of Tasmania, Australia, near the Freycinet Peninsula.

It is close to the northernmost point of Maria Island and is part of the Maria Island National Park.

== Fauna ==
Recorded breeding seabird species are little penguin and short-tailed shearwater. The metallic skink is present. Rakali have also been seen on the island.

== See also ==
- Protected areas of Tasmania
- List of islands of Tasmania
