= Maria Island =

Island off the eastern Tasmanian coast

Native name: wukaluwikiwayna
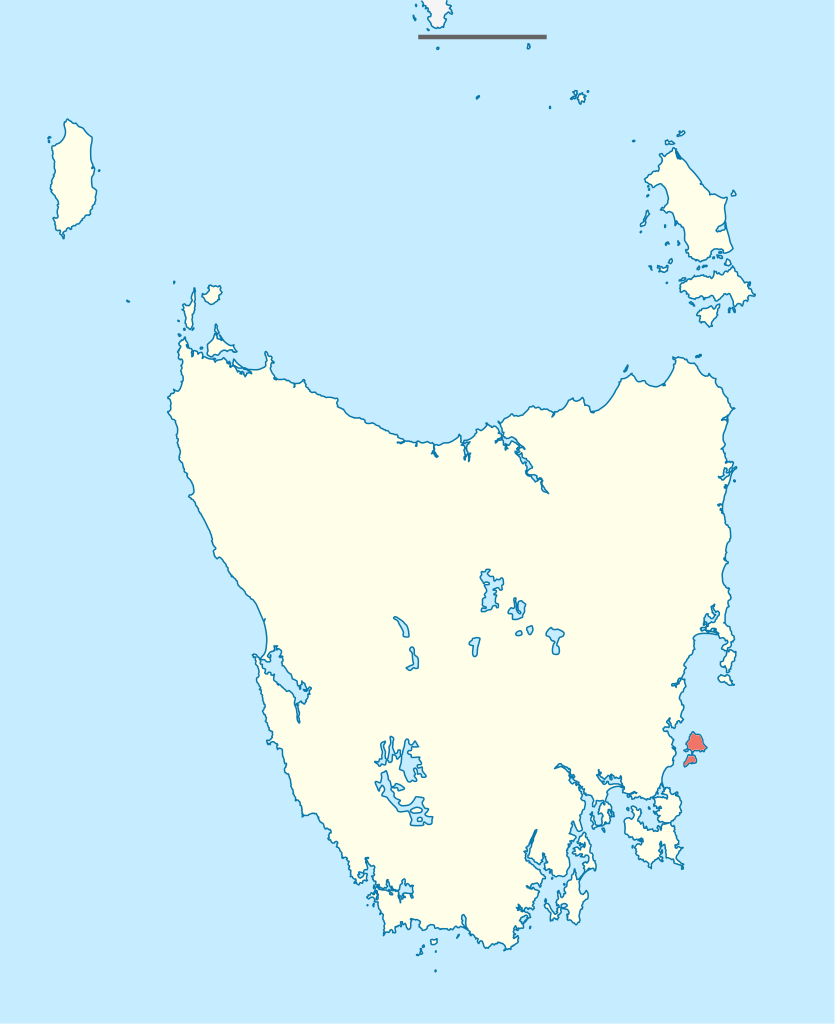
- Location of Maria Island (shaded red) in Tasmania
- Etymology: In honour of Maria van Diemen (née van Aelst), wife of Anthony van Diemen; named in 1642 by Abel Tasman

Geography
- Location: East coast of Tasmania
- Coordinates: 42°38′S 148°05′E
- Archipelago: Maria Island Group
- Adjacent to: Tasman Sea
- Total islands: Two
- Major islands: Maria Island; Ile du Nord
- Area: 115.5 km^{2} (44.6 sq mi)
- Length: 20 km (12 mi)
- Width: 13 km (8.1 mi)
- Highest elevation: 711 m (2333 ft)
- Highest point: Mount Maria

Administration
- Australia
- State: Tasmania
- Local government area: Glamorgan Spring Bay Council
- Largest settlement: Darlington

Demographics
- Population: Rangers are the only residents

Additional information
- Time zone: AEST (UTC+10)
  - Summer (DST): AEDT (UTC+11)
- Maria Island National Park

Maria Island National Park
- IUCN category II (national park)
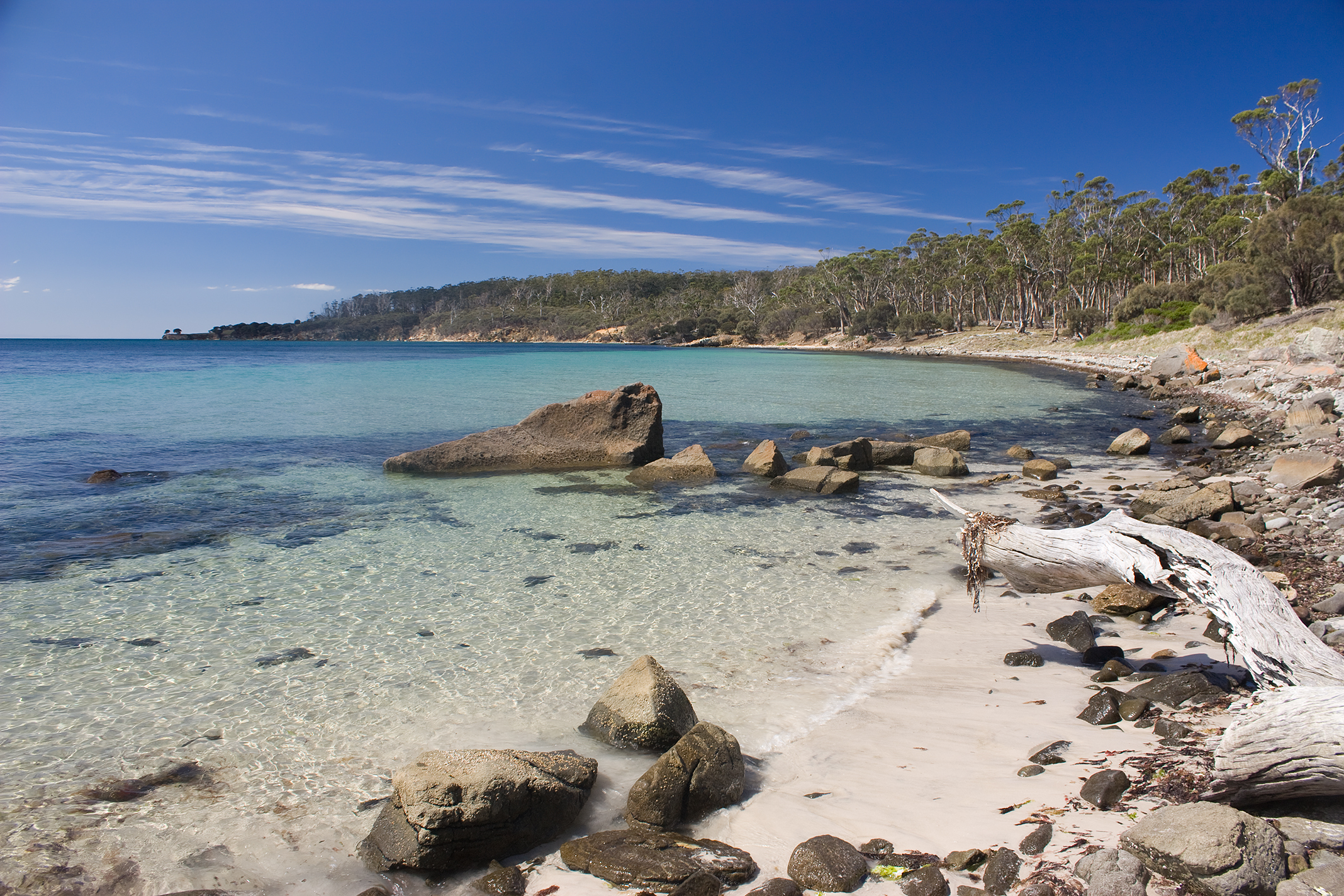
- Maria Island Beach

- Location within Tasmania
- Interactive map of Maria Island National Park
- Location: Tasmania
- Nearest city: Triabunna, Orford
- Area: 115.5 km^{2} (44.6 sq mi)
- Established: 1972
- Visitors: 16,000 (in 2005)
- Governing body: Parks and Wildlife Service, Tasmania
- Website: Official website

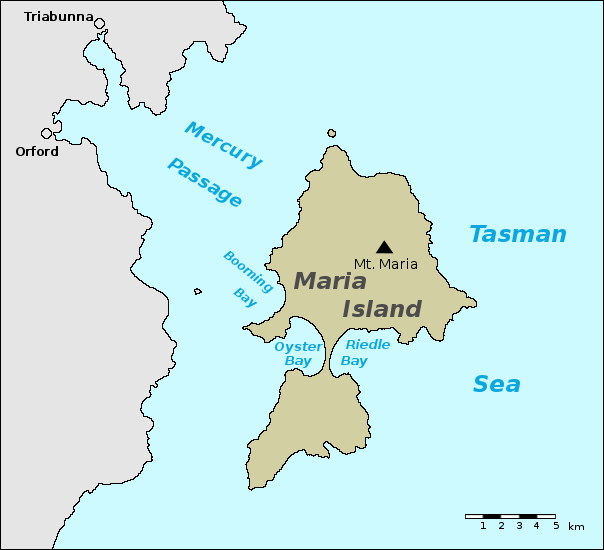
Maria Island

Maria Island (palawa kani: wukaluwikiwayna) is a mountainous island located in the Tasman Sea, off the east coast of Tasmania, Australia. The 115.5-square-kilometre (44.6 sq mi) island is entirely occupied by the Maria Island National Park, which includes a marine area of 18.78 square kilometres (7.25 sq mi) off the island's northwest coast. The island is about 20 kilometres (12 mi) in length from north to south and, at its widest, is about 13 kilometres (8.1 mi) west to east. At its closest point, Point Lesueur, the island lies approximately 4 kilometres (2.5 mi) off the east coast of Tasmania and is connected by ferry with Triabunna. Maria Island lies in the local government area of Glamorgan–Spring Bay in the South-east LGA Region of Tasmania.

The island has had a mixed history, including two convict eras, two industrial eras, a farming era and, finally, becoming the national park that it is today. Maria Island is popular with visitors, providing an array of interests for the daytripper or overnight visitor to the island.

== Etymology ==
Tasmanians pronounce the name /məˈraɪə/ mə-RY-ə, as did the early British settlers but the original pronunciation was /məˈriːə/ mə-REE-ə. The island was named in 1642 by Dutch explorer Abel Tasman after Maria van Diemen (née van Aelst), wife of Anthony van Diemen, the Governor-General of the Dutch East Indies in Batavia. The island was known as Maria's Isle in the early 19th century.

== Geography ==
=== Physical geography ===
Maria Island is a mountainous island located in the Tasman Sea, off the east coast of Tasmania, Australia. The 115.5-square-kilometre (44.6 sq mi) island is contained within the Maria Island National Park, which includes a marine area of 18.78 square kilometres (7.25 sq mi) off the island's northwest coast. The island measures 19.3 kilometres (12.0 mi) in length from north to south and, at its widest, about 13 kilometres (8.1 mi) west to east.

The island takes the form of a figure-eight, with the northern section being significantly larger than the southern. Both parts of the island have quite rugged relief and they are joined by a tombolo about 3 kilometres (1.9 mi) long known as McRaes Isthmus. The highest point, Mount Maria, is in the northern part of the island and stands 711 metres (2,333 ft) above sea level. Maria Island has been separated from nearby mainland Tasmania for some 3 to 4 thousand years.

=== Human geography and economy ===
The strait between Maria Island and the east coast of mainland Tasmania is called the Mercury Passage and was named after HMS Mercury, commanded by John Henry Cox, who charted the area in 1789. There are two towns of size in this part of the east coast: Orford at the mouth of the Prosser River and Triabunna, some eight kilometres (5 mi) further north at the head of Spring Bay.

The island's sole settlement is Darlington, a former penal settlement and later convict probation station located near the northern tip of the island. There are thirteen remaining intact convict-era buildings and structures. The station is one of eleven convict sites that comprise the Australian Convict Sites World Heritage serial listing.

Darlington has no permanent inhabitants other than a few park rangers. During the summer holiday period, up to several hundred tourists visit the island. Tourism is important to the local economy. In nearby Triabunna, other major industries include fishing, forestry and agriculture. Rock lobster, scalefish, scallops and abalone are taken near the island by both commercial and recreational fishermen, and mussels are farmed in Mercury Passage.

== History ==
=== Aboriginal people ===
Before the colonial era, Aboriginal people of the Tyreddeme band of the Oyster Bay tribe journeyed regularly to the island and much evidence of their presence remains, particularly around the bays on either side of the island's isthmus. In 1802, the French expedition led by Nicolas Baudin encountered the Aboriginal people of Maria Island, as did the whalers and seal hunters of the early 19th century. René Maugé, the zoologist on Baudin's expedition, was buried on Point Maugé on south Maria Island.

=== Convicts ===
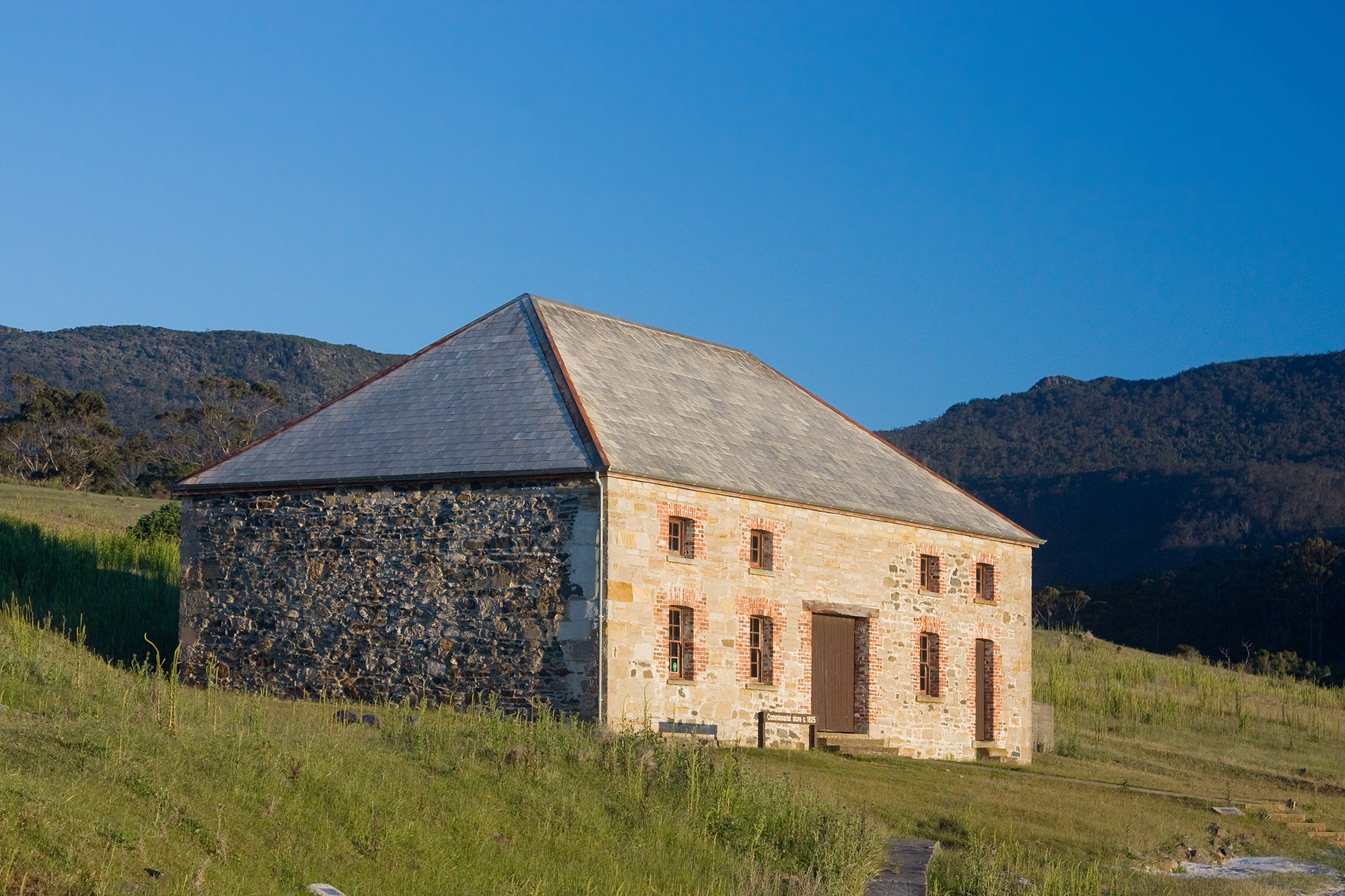
Commissariat Store, Darlington

For two periods during the first half of the 19th century, Maria Island hosted convict settlements. The island's first convict era was between 1825 and 1832 and its second – the probation station era – between 1842 and 1850. Among those held during the second era was the Irish nationalist leader William Smith O'Brien, exiled for his part in the Young Irelander Rebellion of 1848. His cottage still exists in the nearby former penal colony Port Arthur to where he was deported after his time on Maria Island. He was later transferred to New Norfolk on the Derwent River upstream of Hobart.

Three structures from the first convict era remain in the Darlington area: the Commissariat Store built in 1825 and presently used as the park's reception and visitor centre; the convict penitentiary, completed in 1828 and now used to accommodate visitors rather than detain them; and the convict-built dam on Bernacchis Creek, which still provides Darlington's water.

==== First convict era 1825–32 ====
Lieutenant Governor Arthur established a penal settlement at Darlington in 1825 for convicts whose crimes were not of 'so flagrant a nature' that they should be sent to the notorious Macquarie Harbour settlement on Tasmania's west coast. A small party of soldiers under the command of Lieutenant Peter Murdoch, and fifty male prisoners, arrived at the island aboard the ship Prince Leopold in March 1825. Initially housing was log and bark huts or tents. After the arrival of a new Commandant, Major Thomas Lord, in August, more permanent buildings were erected using bricks made on the island and sandstone excavated from the sea cliffs. The commissariat store (1825) and the penitentiary (1830) can still be seen today and are the only surviving buildings from this era. Industries such as cloth, blanket and shoe-making, tanning, timber cutting, and pottery were fostered. Frequent escape attempts, complaints about relaxed discipline and the opening of Port Arthur in 1830 led to the decision to abandon the settlement in 1832.

==== Second convict era 1842–50 ====
The second convict era commenced in 1842. Under the probation system of the 1840s, convicts were withdrawn from private service and grouped together in government stations. Probation stations were established at Darlington and Point Lesueur (10 kilometres south-southwest of Darlington and also known as Long Point). Agricultural work was a key activity for convicts, particularly as there were in excess of 400 acres (1.6 km^{2}) of crops to maintain. Officials and 600 male convicts in Darlington were housed in old and altered structures re-used from the first convict era, and new buildings were also erected. Overcrowding and ill-adapted buildings were constant problems.

=== Industry and farming ===
Sealing was conducted on the island from at least 1805. Shore-based bay whaling was conducted in the 1830s and 1840s at four locations on the island: Darlington, Isle du Nord, Whalers Cove and Haunted Bay. In the 19th century, whaling ships sometimes anchored off shore and hunted for whales.

From the 1880s, the Italian entrepreneur Diego Bernacchi set up island enterprises, including silk and wine production and a cement factory, quarrying limestone deposits at the Fossil Cliffs for the raw material. A substantial cement works was built at Darlington in the early 1920s, with a 2 ft gauge tramway linking the quarries to the cement works and a new jetty. At the height of its fortunes in the early 20th century, Darlington had hundreds of residents and several hotels. The design and layout of the company town established by Bernacchi reflected prevailing ideas of paternalism, though archaeological survey found that the workers cottages had been individualised by their inhabitants. By July 1930, all of those ventures had failed for a number of reasons, including the Great Depression, poor quality limestone, and competition from mainland producers who were not burdened with high costs of transport.

==== First industrial era 1888–96 ====
Maria Island's potential for wine and silk production, fruit-growing and tourist developments attracted an Italian entrepreneur, Diego Bernacchi. In 1884 Bernacchi secured a long-term lease of the island from the Tasmanian Government and the 'Maria Island Company' was formed. Bernacchi renamed Darlington "San Diego", and the little town soon had in excess of 250 residents of a variety of different nationalities. Bernacchi established a small cement works which made use of the island's limestone deposits. The opening of the Grand Hotel in 1888, complete with dining, billiard and accommodation rooms, saw the promotion of the island as a pleasure resort and sanatorium. Also constructed during this era were the Coffee Palace, a row of workers' cottages known as the 'Twelve Apostles' and six terraced cottages, built using bricks from the demolished convict separate apartment cells. Some of the old convict buildings were re-modelled to house workers, managers and shops. Bernacchi's family resided in the old religious instructor's house for a time. The 208-cell apartment block from the second convict era was demolished and the bricks used to build other buildings and roads. Only two photographs exist today of this building. Although Bernacchi was enthusiastic, the Maria Island Company went into liquidation in 1892. Bernacchi promoted the island's cement industry and formed a new company for that purpose. It was short-lived, and in 1896 Bernacchi and his family left for Melbourne, and subsequently London. Afterwards, tourists continued to frequent the island where Rosa Adkins ran a boarding house in the former Coffee Palace.

==== Second industrial era 1925–30 ====
Diego Bernacchi returned to Maria Island, determined to exploit the limestone deposits for cement and expand on his initial plans. The National Portland Cement Company Ltd was formed in 1920. The annual report for 1923 revealed that a new 620-foot (190 m) pier had been constructed and that buildings were being erected, including a 200 ft (61 m) high chimney stack of reinforced concrete. A railway line conveyed limestone to the works. Machinery worth over £125,000 had been imported from Copenhagen and London. The works were officially opened in February 1924. Community life prospered for the 500 or so residents. Social and sports clubs sprang up, dances were held and the old chapel was used as a cinema. A school was erected for the employees' children. The schoolmaster's house of this period is now the Ranger's Office. Unfortunately, production problems were experienced at the works from an early stage, and together with the effects of the Great Depression, caused the cessation of business in 1930.

==== Farming era 1930–72 ====
For a period of 40 years until the late 1960s, the island was dominated by farming. The South Island was farmed by John Robey, a South African, with his wife Hilda. Robey's Farm is located on the west side of the south island, and although essentially complete in a "just walked away" fashion as late as the early 1980s, the location has since been extensively vandalised, and the farmhouse further damaged by weather and neglect by the Parks and Wildlife Service.

After the conclusion of the second industrial era, Maria Island became a quiet home to a few farming families. In particular, the Adkins, French, Howell, Robey, Hunt and Haigh families spent many years on the island. The Adkins family in particular have a longer association with the island than any other name, with four generations of them calling the island home - commencing in the 1880s and continuing until the 1960s. A number of these families' names are cemented into the island's history by having buildings, farms or sites that still have their name. These include the Adkins' house (burnt down in recent years), French's Farm, Robey's Farm, Hunt's Cottage, Howell's Farm and Haigh's Farm (site only). Farming ended when the Tasmanian Government began purchasing properties from their owners in preparation for declaring the island a national park.

=== National Park ===
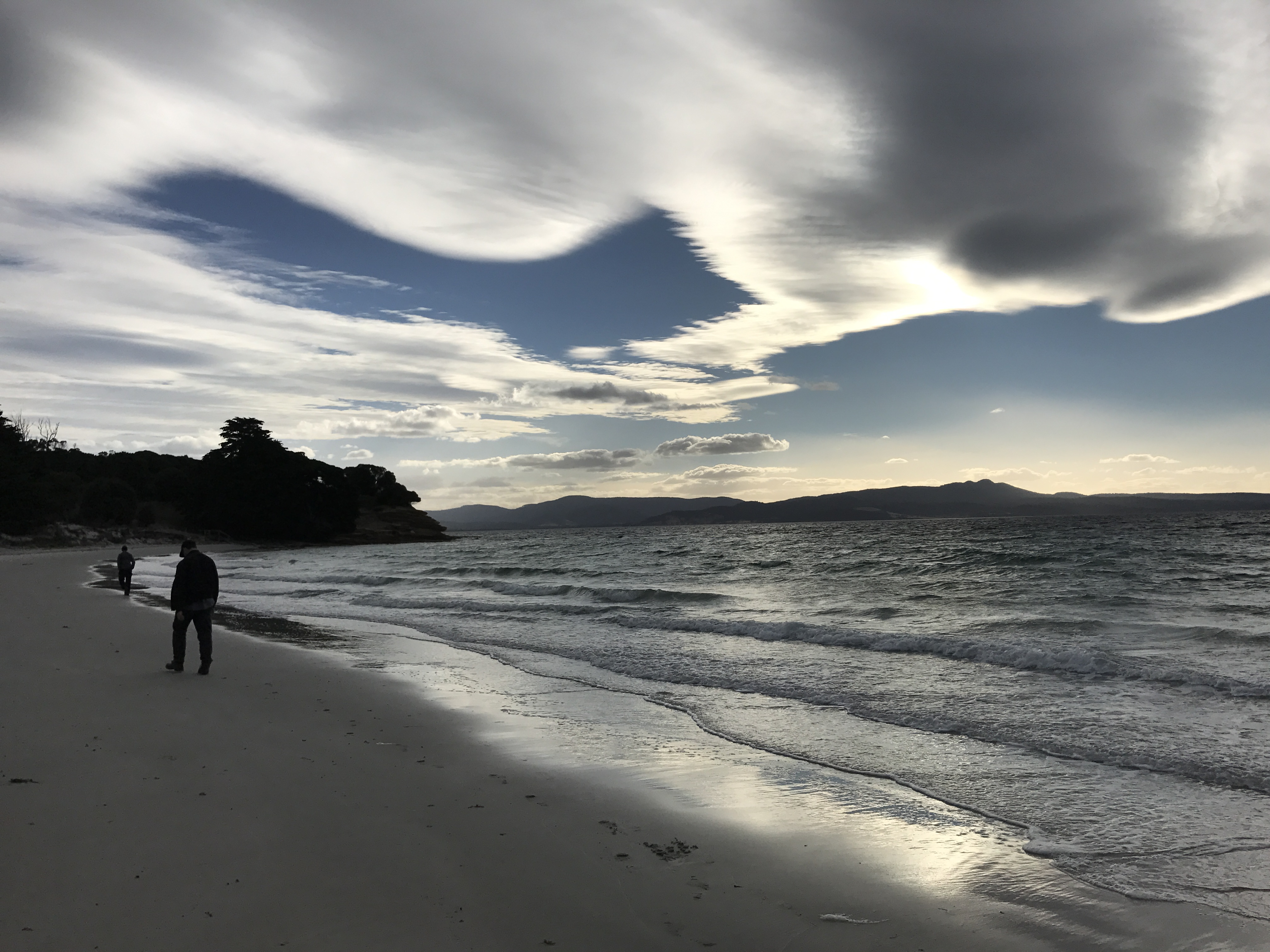
Tourists walking along a beach north of the Painted Cliffs, Maria Island

The Tasmanian Government resumed all of the island's freehold land and established the national park, proclaimed in 1971 and extended in 1991, to include part of the surrounding sea. From the late 1960s various species of fauna were released onto the island, including mammals and birds such as Cape Barren geese and emus (from mainland Australia). Emu numbers increased to an estimated 20–30 by the early 1980s, by which time it was decided they were a risk to visitors and efforts were made to eradicate them. The last emu is thought to have been shot during the first of the Kangaroo culls in 1994. They have not been sighted since.

The island's first ranger was Rex Gatenby. Prior to the island being declared a national park, many of the historical cement works buildings were demolished due to the danger the government thought the buildings would present to tourists. At this time such buildings were not generally considered historically significant.

== Environment ==
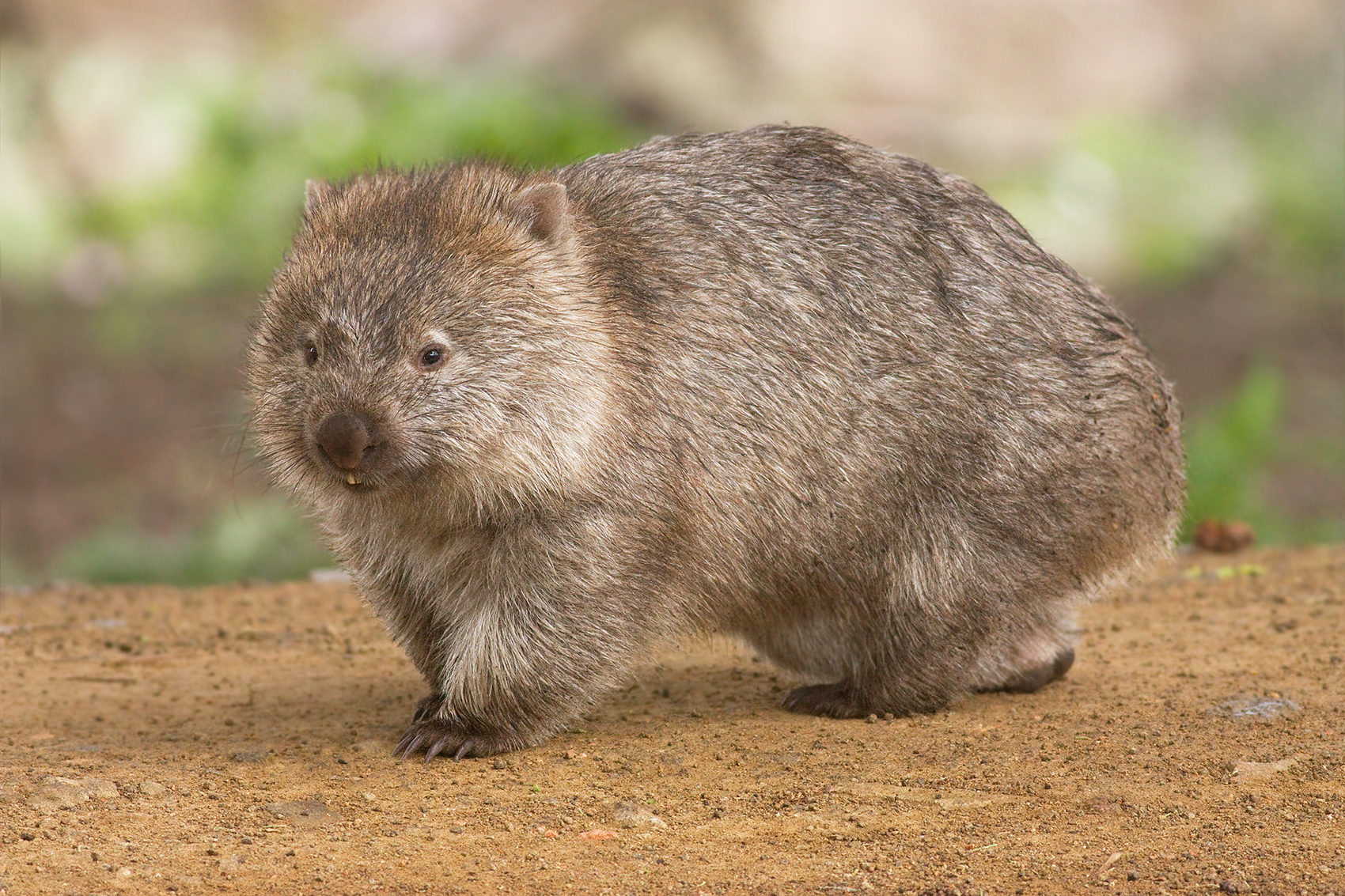
Common wombat on Maria Island

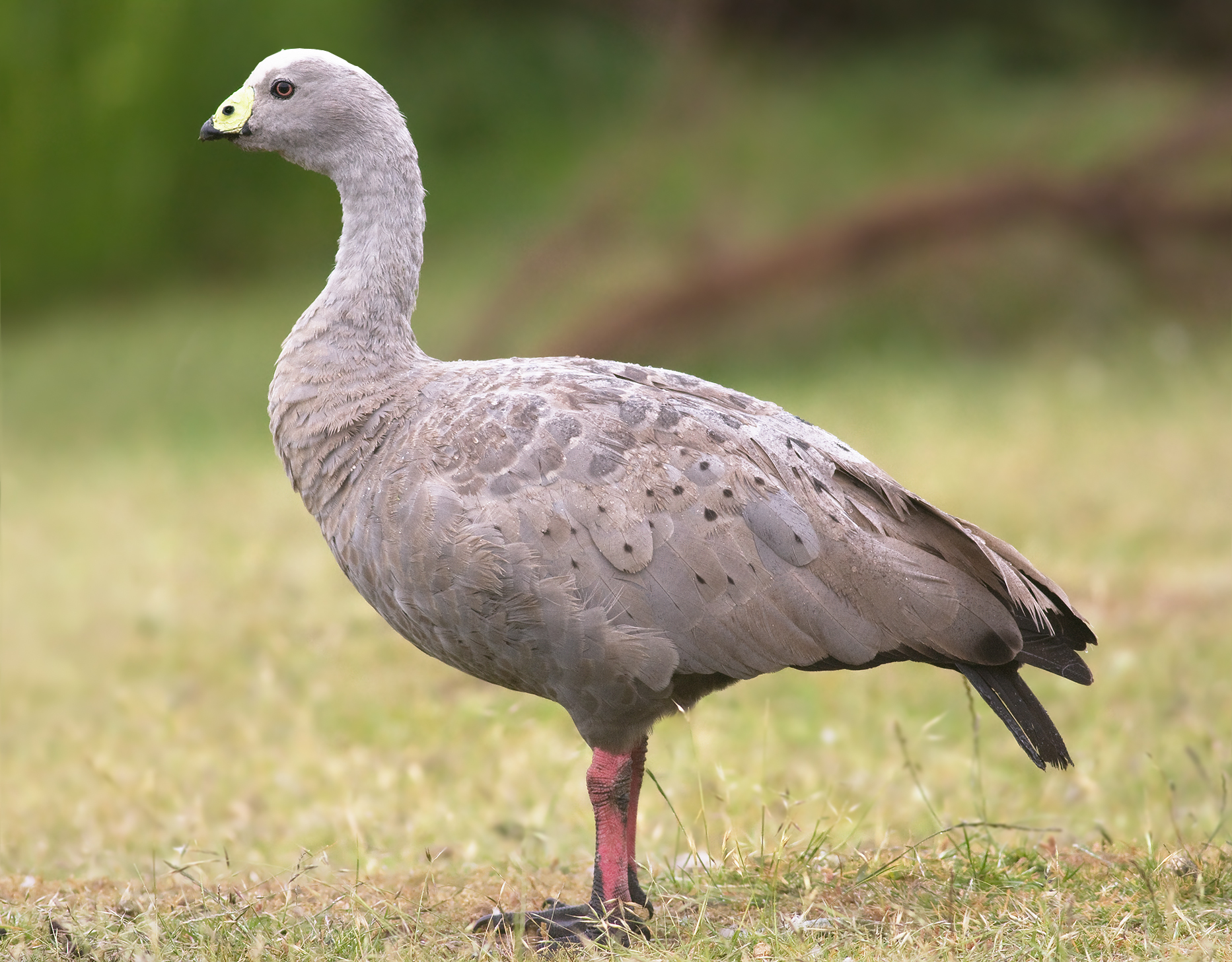
Cape Barren goose on Maria Island

=== Flora and fauna ===
Fourteen distinct terrestrial plant communities occur on the island, which is mostly clothed in various forms of eucalypt forest. Natural and historical clearings provide grazing for many animals, such as bare-nosed wombats (Vombatus ursinus), some of which are blonde colour, which occur in high quantities on the island and Tasmanian pademelons. Nearly all the island's animals are native to Tasmania although some, including eastern grey kangaroos, red-necked wallabies, and Cape Barren geese, were introduced during the late 1960s and early 1970s. Fallow deer were also introduced to the island and were present primarily in the French's Farm area. Sheep were present until around 1981, escapes from prior sheep farming operations. Other animals include common brushtail, ringtail possums, short-beaked echidnas and three species of snake.

Cape Barren geese are common on the island, as are eastern grey kangaroos, eastern bettongss and other marsupials. Common wombats can be seen almost anywhere. Tasmania's three species of snake are all found on the island: the tiger snake, lowland copperhead and white-lipped snake.

==== Birds ====
Maria Island has been identified by BirdLife International as an Important Bird Area (IBA) because it supports significant numbers of endangered swift parrots and forty-spotted pardalotes, over 1% of the world population of Pacific gulls, as well as populations of most of Tasmania's endemic bird species.

==== Tasmanian devils ====
In November 2012, captive Tasmanian devils were introduced to the island and are cared for by the Tasmania Parks and Wildlife Service staff who live on the island. These devils form part of the "insurance population" of devils unaffected by the devil facial tumour disease that is sweeping through mainland Tasmania's devil population. Tasmanian devils are sometimes seen by visitors. There is some evidence that the devils are impacting on the bird life of the island. A population of little blue penguins that numbered 3,000 breeding pairs before the introduction has since disappeared completely from the island.

=== Marine habitats ===
The marine section of the national park protects a representative area of Tasmanian East Coast marine habitat, and has significantly larger individuals and populations of key marine species than surrounding waters. This area is one of the most intensively studied marine protected areas in Australia and is popular with divers. The marine section of the park extends from an unnamed point north-east of Bishop and Clerk, westwards to Cape Boullanger and then southwards as far as Return Point. The marine boundary's definition varies, but it is never more than 1 km from Maria Island's low water mark.

Maria Island National Park includes a marine area which stretches from Fossil Bay on the northern coast of the island to Return Point on the west coast, and extends up to a kilometre offshore. South-west of the Painted Cliffs and just outside the marine section of the park, a disused coastal trader was sunk in 2007 to form an artificial reef dive site. There are also numerous shipwrecks around the island.

=== Climate ===
Data as of 2016.

Climate data for Maria Island (Point Lesueur; 28 m AMSL)
Month	Jan	Feb	Mar	Apr	May	Jun	Jul	Aug	Sep	Oct	Nov	Dec	Year
Record high °C (°F)	35.2 (95.4)	32.6 (90.7)	29.6 (85.3)	27.5 (81.5)	21.0 (69.8)	18.5 (65.3)	18.0 (64.4)	19.4 (66.9)	23.5 (74.3)	29.0 (84.2)	30.8 (87.4)	35.5 (95.9)	35.5 (95.9)
Mean daily maximum °C (°F)	21.4 (70.5)	21.0 (69.8)	20.2 (68.4)	17.6 (63.7)	15.3 (59.5)	13.1 (55.6)	12.7 (54.9)	13.5 (56.3)	15.3 (59.5)	16.8 (62.2)	18.1 (64.6)	19.9 (67.8)	17.1 (62.8)
Mean daily minimum °C (°F)	13.6 (56.5)	13.8 (56.8)	13.0 (55.4)	11.2 (52.2)	9.5 (49.1)	8.0 (46.4)	7.4 (45.3)	7.5 (45.5)	8.5 (47.3)	9.4 (48.9)	10.9 (51.6)	12.2 (54.0)	10.4 (50.7)
Record low °C (°F)	8.1 (46.6)	7.7 (45.9)	6.3 (43.3)	5.2 (41.4)	4.0 (39.2)	3.5 (38.3)	2.5 (36.5)	1.8 (35.2)	2.8 (37.0)	2.5 (36.5)	4.5 (40.1)	6.2 (43.2)	1.8 (35.2)
Average rainfall mm (inches)	45.3 (1.78)	34.2 (1.35)	41.3 (1.63)	34.2 (1.35)	38.5 (1.52)	50.5 (1.99)	29.8 (1.17)	44.1 (1.74)	44.8 (1.76)	35.1 (1.38)	54.9 (2.16)	49.6 (1.95)	518.1 (20.40)
Average rainy days (≥ 1 mm)	5.1	6.0	7.1	5.5	5.9	6.6	6.9	6.9	6.4	7.1	7.6	6.8	77.9
Source: Bureau of Meteorology

== Access ==
=== Transport ===
A ferry sails multiple times a day from the town of Triabunna to the jetty in Darlington Bay at the northern end of Maria Island, a distance by sea of 16 km or nearly nine nautical miles. In winter, some sailings are subject to demand, while in summer extra sailings are provided. A previous ferry operation out of Louisville (near Orford) is now defunct. Common dolphins, Australian fur seals and seabirds such as Australasian gannets and shy albatrosses are often seen on the voyage. Tourist flights to the island can be made from Cambridge Airport or Friendly Beaches.

=== Facilities ===
Very basic accommodation is available in Darlington in "the Penitentiary", a former place of internment, built during the first convict era. Bookings can be made with the Parks and Wildlife Service. There are ten rooms that have bunk beds with vinyl mattresses, a table and chairs, and a wood heater. Nine of the rooms sleep six people each, and the tenth sleeps fourteen people. All cooking gear, lighting, bedding and food must be brought to the island. There is no electricity or running water in the rooms, but toilets, hot showers, and barbecues are nearby. Many visitors also choose to camp in the camping area in Darlington - an advance booking is not necessary for this.

=== Activities and attractions ===
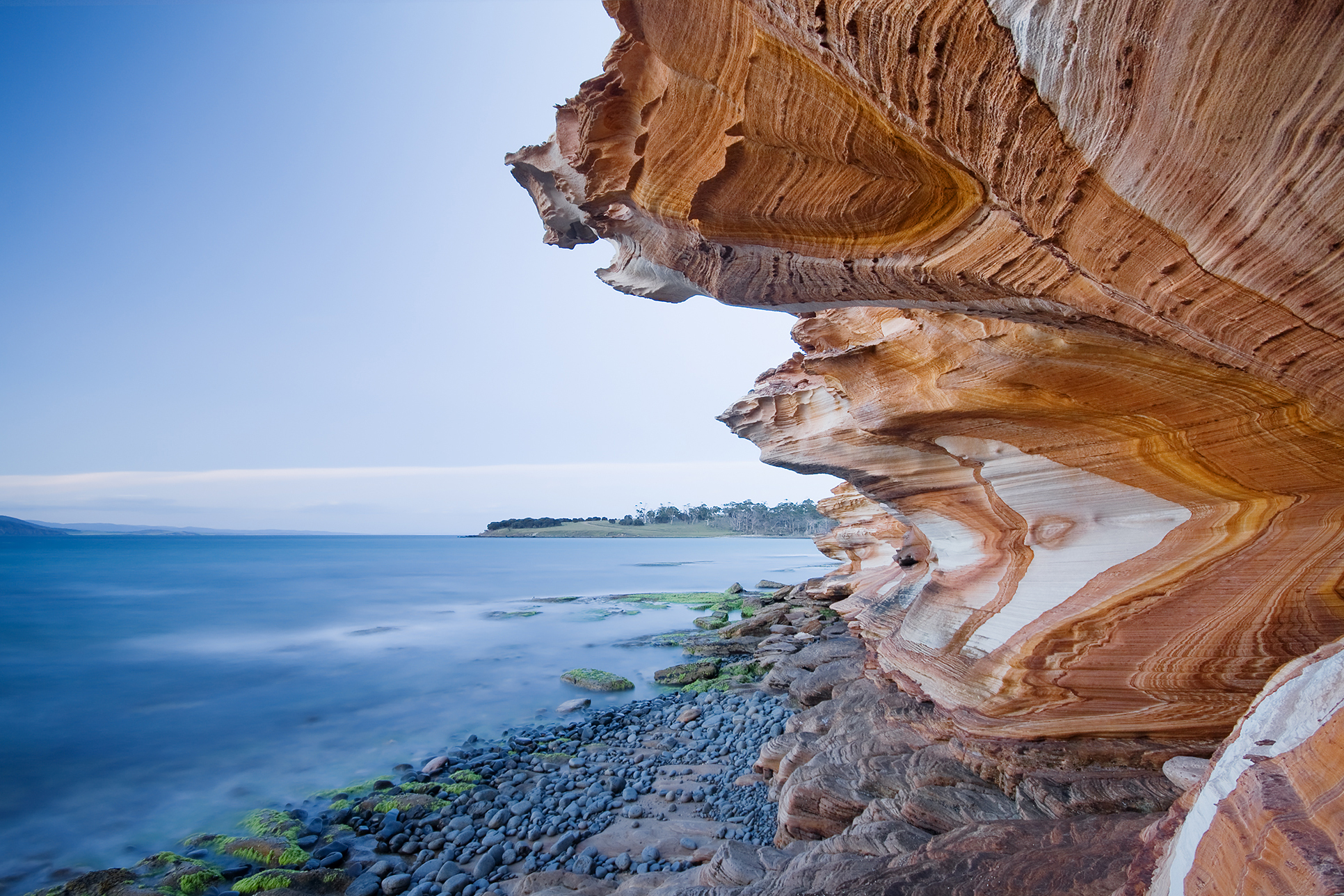
The Painted Cliffs.

The historical and natural assets of Maria Island attract many tourists. As well as the industrial and convict buildings and ruins, there are natural features and many walks.

Walking, bicycling, swimming, snorkelling, diving, bird watching, wildlife observation and relaxation are the main activities undertaken by visitors. Many people take interest in Maria Island's history, and most of the island's walks include sites of historic interest. The Painted Cliffs and the Fossil Cliffs are two popular walking destinations for day visitors, both on the island's coastline. The Painted Cliffs are sandstone with beautiful patterns formed through staining by iron oxide. The Fossil Cliffs are tall limestone cliffs containing prolific ancient fossils. Longer day walks include tracks that ascend Bishop and Clerk (620 metres (2,030 ft)) and Mount Maria (711 metres (2,333 ft)). Mount Maria is a six- to seven-hour return walk from Darlington while Bishop and Clerk can be completed in about four hours return.

Nearly all roads and tracks on the island are suitable for bicycling. Bicycles and helmets can be rented in Triabunna and brought over on the ferry. A bicycle is a must for those who want to see as much of the island as possible on a day trip. Bicycle-riding is not permitted on beaches or on the two mountain tracks.

A vehicular track extends from Darlington 20 kilometres (12 mi) south to Haunted Bay on south Maria Island, with a number of side-tracks and points of interest along the way. Haunted Bay is so named because of the constant calling in the evening of the many fairy penguins that live there. The track south is the usual route for people doing bike rides or multi-day walks. The major campsites outside Darlington are at Frenchs Farm, 11 kilometres (6.8 mi) from Darlington, and Encampment Cove, a further 2 kilometres (1.2 mi) away, which is also used by boating visitors. This area is referred to by boaters as Chinamans Bay (Chinamans is the bay just north of Encampment Cove). Both Frenchs Farm and Encampment Cove have rainwater tanks. The Frenchs Farm tank is less likely to run out during summer. Water can be hard to find elsewhere.

From Encampment Cove it is about a 1 kilometre (0.62 mi) walk to the ruins of Maria Island's second (probation-era) convict station at Point Lesueur on the island's west coast (also known as Long Point). Soldiers Beach and Bloodstone Beach are on the western side of the island, while Shoal Bay and Riedle Bay lie on either side of McRaes Isthmus.

In 2007, a disused coastal trader, the Troy D, was scuttled outside the marine section of the national park, 1.7 kilometres (1.1 mi) west-southwest of the Painted Cliffs, with the intention of creating a dive wreck.

== See also ==
- Darlington Probation Station
- Protected areas of Tasmania
- List of islands of Tasmania
