= Moulting Lagoon Important Bird Area =

Lake in Tasmania, Australia

Coordinates: 42°01′33″S 148°11′25″E

Designations

Ramsar Wetland
- Official name: Moulting Lagoon
- Designated: 16 November 1982
- Reference no.: 251

Ramsar Wetland
- Official name: Apsley Marshes
- Designated: 16 November 1982
- Reference no.: 255

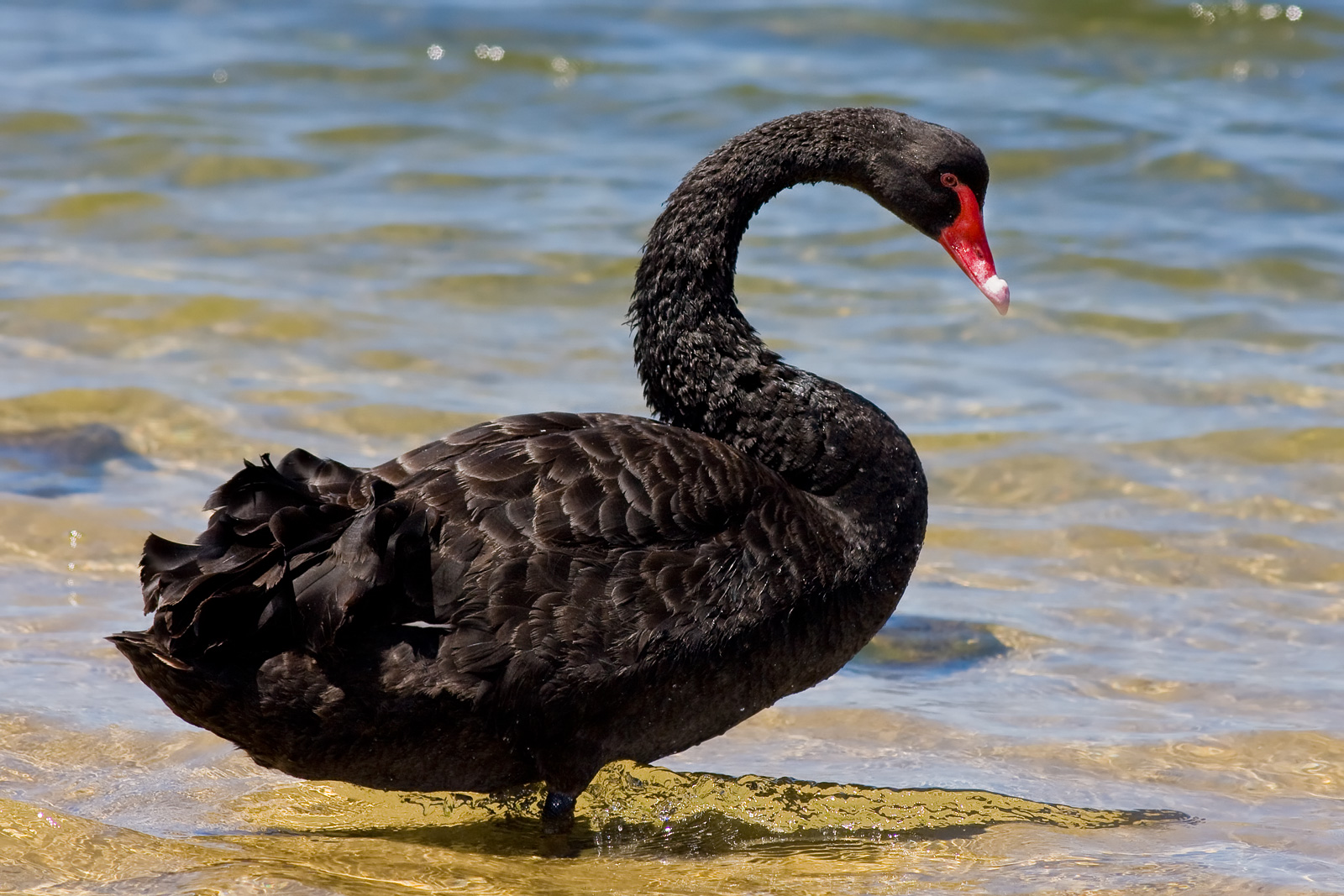
The IBA is an important area for black swans

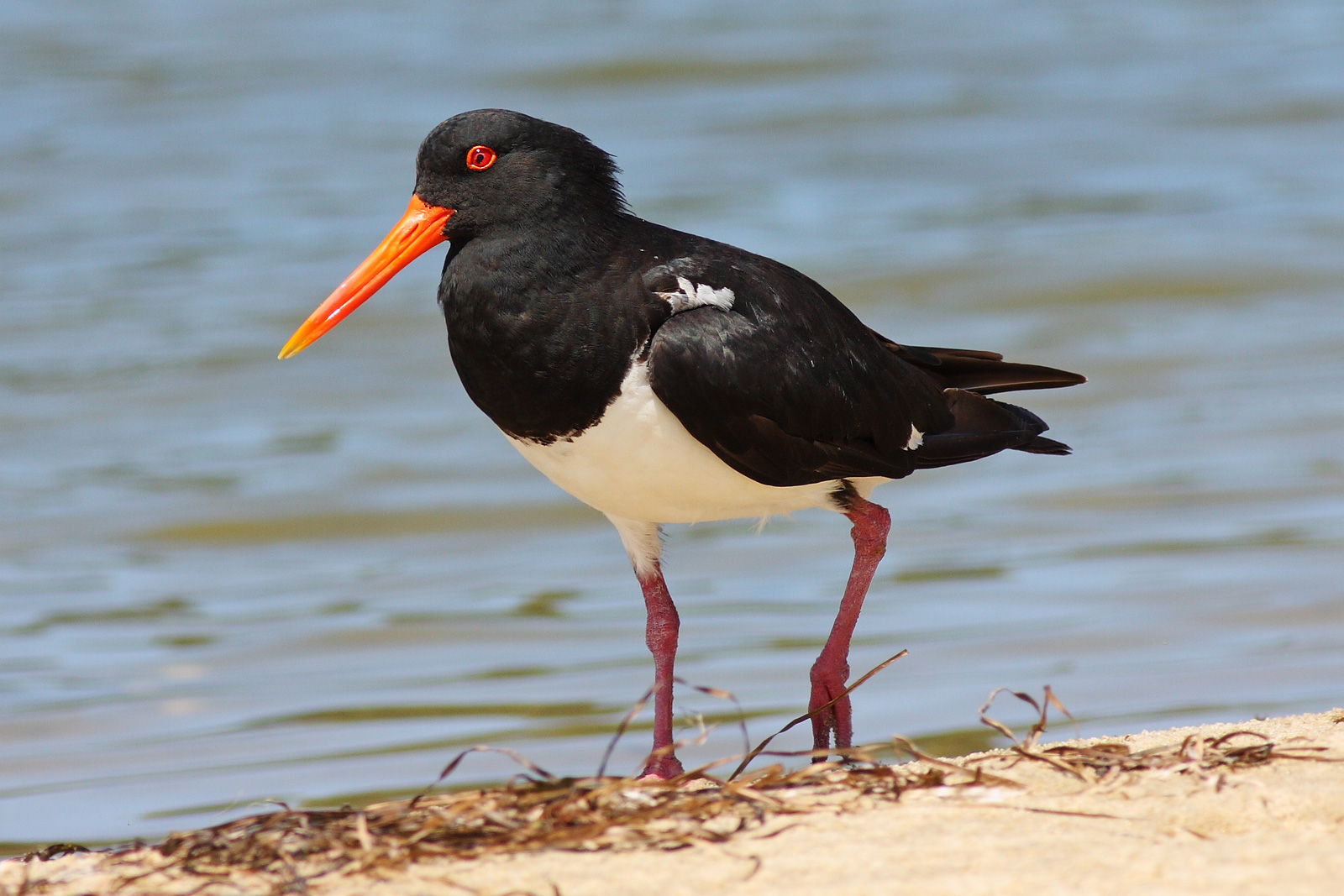
...as well as for pied oystercatchers

Moulting Lagoon Important Bird Area is a composite wetland site in eastern Tasmania, Australia. It comprises two adjacent and hydrologically continuous wetlands – Moulting Lagoon and the Apsley Marshes – at the head of Great Oyster Bay, near the base of the Freycinet Peninsula, between the towns of Swansea and Bicheno. Both components of the site are listed separately under the Ramsar Convention as wetlands of international significance. Moulting Lagoon is so named because it is a traditional moulting place for black swans. It is an important site for waterbirds.

== Description ==
Moulting Lagoon is a coastal lagoon, or largely enclosed estuary, formed at the mouths of the Swan and Apsley Rivers, which have a combined catchment area of 900 km^{2}, and sheltered from the ocean by Nine Mile Spit. It is adjacent to the Apsley Marshes which store and filter floodwater from the Apsley River for gradual release into the lagoon. The geology of the site is dominated by Holocene alluvial gravels and sands with smaller areas of Jurassic dolerite and Triassic sandstone. Average annual rainfall (recorded at Swansea) is 611 mm; average maximum temperatures are 13 °C in winter and 22 °C in summer. The tidal range of the lagoon varies from 0.3 m in its upper reaches to 0.8 m at the mouth. Although the lagoon's hydrology is usually dominated by its estuarine nature, during peak flows of the Swan River these are overridden by large quantities of fresh water. During hot, dry weather, salinity levels may reach twice that of seawater in some areas. The lagoon contains areas of both deep and shallow water and is surrounded by tidal mudflats and saltmarsh. The western shore has been cleared and is mainly used for agriculture and livestock grazing; the eastern shore retains much of its native vegetation.

=== Plants ===
Zostera seagrasses cover about 25 km^{2} of the lagoon bed. The margins support successive bands of beaded glasswort, jointed rush and Poa grass tussocks, swamp paperbark and silver wattle, and Oyster Bay pine or pasture. Apsley marshes contain areas of woody vegetation dominated by paperbarks, some saltmarsh, large areas of common reed and freshwater aquatic herbland.

=== Birds ===
The lagoon and the adjacent marshes have been identified by BirdLife International as a 63 km^{2} Important Bird Area (IBA) because they regularly support over 1% of the world populations of black swans and pied oystercatchers. Other waterbirds sometimes present on the lagoon in substantial numbers include Australian shelducks, chestnut teals, Australasian shovellers, musk ducks, black-faced and little pied cormorants, hoary-headed and great crested grebes, crested and Caspian terns, white-faced herons, masked lapwings, red-capped and double-banded plovers, and red-necked stints. It supports the largest flock of common greenshanks in Tasmania.

== History ==
The area was extensively used by the Oyster Bay Tribe, especially for harvesting swan eggs, prior to European settlement in the early 19th century. By the late 1820s most arable land in the region had been taken by European settlers. Subsequently, it became a popular site for waterfowl hunting, especially of chestnut teal and Australian shelduck. In 1918 much of the lagoon was proclaimed a sanctuary for waterfowl, though in 1928 it reverted to crown land. In 1959 and 1980 some parts of the lagoon were given legislative protection; however, attempts to give protection to the whole area was resisted by duck hunters and local residents. It was eventually proclaimed a game reserve in 1988, with seasonal hunting over much of the area continuing to take place, though the use of lead shot ended in 2005. Contemporary use of the lagoon includes recreational boating and fishing as well as oyster farming.

=== Ramsar listing ===
On 16 November 1982 most of what was to become the 4760 ha Moulting Lagoon Game Reserve in 1988 was designated Ramsar site 251, and a 940 ha area of the Apsley Marshes was designated Ramsar site 255, mainly because of their value as waterbird habitat, especially for black swans.
