= Counties of Tasmania =

The 18 former counties of Tasmania, renamed as Land Districts:

- Arthur County
- Buckingham County
- Cornwall County
- Cumberland County
- Devon County
- Dorset County
- Franklin County
- Glamorgan County
- Kent County
- Lincoln County
- Monmouth County
- Montagu County
- Montgomery County
- Pembroke County
- Russell County
- Somerset County
- Wellington County
- Westmoreland County

== See also ==
- Lands administrative divisions of Tasmania
