= Wellington District =

Wellington District may refer to:

- Wellington District, Upper Canada
- Wellington Rural District (disambiguation)
  - Wellington Rural District (Shropshire)
  - Wellington Rural District (Somerset)
- Wellington Land District (disambiguation)
  - Wellington Land District, Western Australia
  - Wellington Land District, Tasmania
