= Russell Land District =

Russell
- Cadastral division
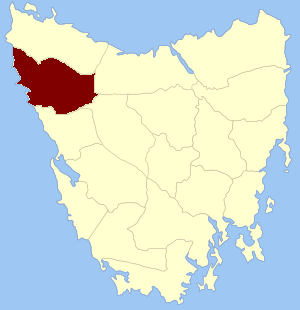
- Location in Tasmania
- Country: Australia
- State: Tasmania
Lands administrative divisions around Russell
Southern Ocean	Wellington	Devon
Southern Ocean	Russell	Devon
Southern Ocean	Montagu	Lincoln

Russell Land District is one of the twenty land districts of Tasmania which are part of the cadastral divisions of Tasmania. It was formerly one of the 18 counties of Tasmania.
