= Somerset Land District =

Somerset Tasmania
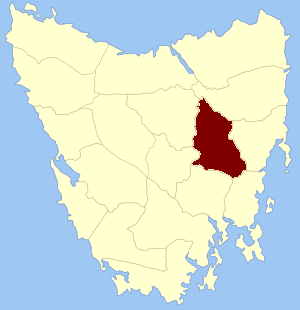
- Location in Tasmania
Lands administrative divisions around Somerset:
Westmoreland	Cornwall	Cornwall
Westmoreland	Somerset	Glamorgan
Cumberland	Monmouth	Pembroke

Somerset Land District is one of the twenty land districts of Tasmania which are part of the Cadastral divisions of Tasmania. It was formerly one of the 18 counties of Tasmania.

== The original parishes ==
On 15 January 1836 George Arthur, the Lieutenant Governor of the Island of Van Diemen's Land proclaimed, via The Hobart Town Courier, the first counties and parishes to be surveyed in the colony.

The County of Somerset, bounded on the north by a portion of the river South Esk, on the east by the Eastern tier to the Macquarie river, and thence by a line to Beaumont's rivulet, and by that rivulet to its junction with the Little Swanport river; on the south by the Little Swanport river, and by the southern boundaries of the parishes of Brisbane, Oatlands, Dulverton and Exmouth to the river Clyde, and on the west by a portion of the river Clyde, by lakes Crescent and Sorell, and by a line from lake Sorell to Wood's lake, and thence by the Lake river to its junction with the South Esk.

Hundreds and parishes proclaimed at this time were:

- The hundred of Lincoln
  - Chichester parish
  - Eskdale
  - Bramber
  - Cadbury
- The hundred of Epping
  - Epping
  - Cleveland
  - Bathurst
  - Salisbury
- The hundred of Cambleton
  - Cambleton
  - Wincanton
  - Eldon
  - Abercrombie
- The hundred of Maitland
  - Ramsbury
  - Lincoln
  - Tierney
  - Lennox
- The hundred of Auburn
  - Denbigh
  - Hill
  - Chatsworth
  - Milton
- The hundred of Ross
  - Ross
  - Pakenham
  - Glenmoriston
  - Gibbs
- The hundred of Cornwallis
  - Peel
  - East Grinstead
  - Durham
  - Cornwallis
- The hundred of Brisbane
  - Sligo
  - Bandon
  - Brisbane
  - Oatlands
- The hundred of Tunbridge
  - Dulverton
  - Exmouth
  - Maxwell
  - another parish unnamed

Townships in the county were proclaimed Perth (portion of), Lincoln, Llewellyn, Campbelton, Abercrombie, Tierney, Maitland, Grindelwald, Auburn (portion of), Ross, East Grinstead, Cornwallis, Andover, Oatlands (portion of), Tunbridge.
