= Westmoreland Land District =

Westmoreland Tasmania
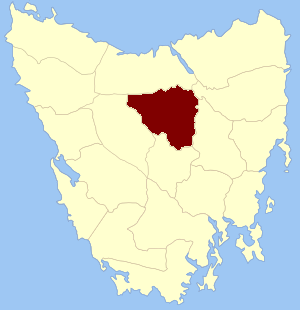
- Location in Tasmania
Lands administrative divisions around Westmoreland:
| Devon | Devon | Cornwall |
| Lincoln | Westmoreland | Somerset |
| Cumberland | Cumberland | Somerset |

Westmoreland Land District is one of the twenty land districts of Tasmania which are part of the Cadastral divisions of Tasmania. It was formerly one of the 18 counties of Tasmania.

== The original parishes ==
On 15 January 1836 George Arthur, the Lieutenant Governor of the Island of Van Diemen's Land proclaimed, via The Hobart Town Courier, the first counties and parishes to be surveyed in the colony.

County of Westmoreland, bounded on the north by the river Meander, and by the great road to the Surrey Hills from Deloraine bridge to the ford in the river Mersey; on the east bv a portion of the river South Esk and the Lake river; on the south by a line from Wood's lake to the Shannon at St. Patrick's plains, and by that river to the Great lake and thence by a line to the river Nive; on the west by the river Nive to its source, and thence by a line by the extreme Western bluff to the ford in the Mersey.

Hundreds and parishes proclaimed at this time were:

- The hundred of Norfolk Plains
  - Longford parish
  - Cressy
  - Carrick
  - Little Hampton
- The hundred of Westbury
  - Westbury
  - Quamby
  - Sillwood
  - Adelphi

The townships of Longford, Carrick, and Westbury were proclaimed as being within the county.
