= Dorset County =

Dorset County may refer to:

- Dorset, United Kingdom
- the former name of Dorset Land District, Tasmania, Australia
