= Ross Bridge =

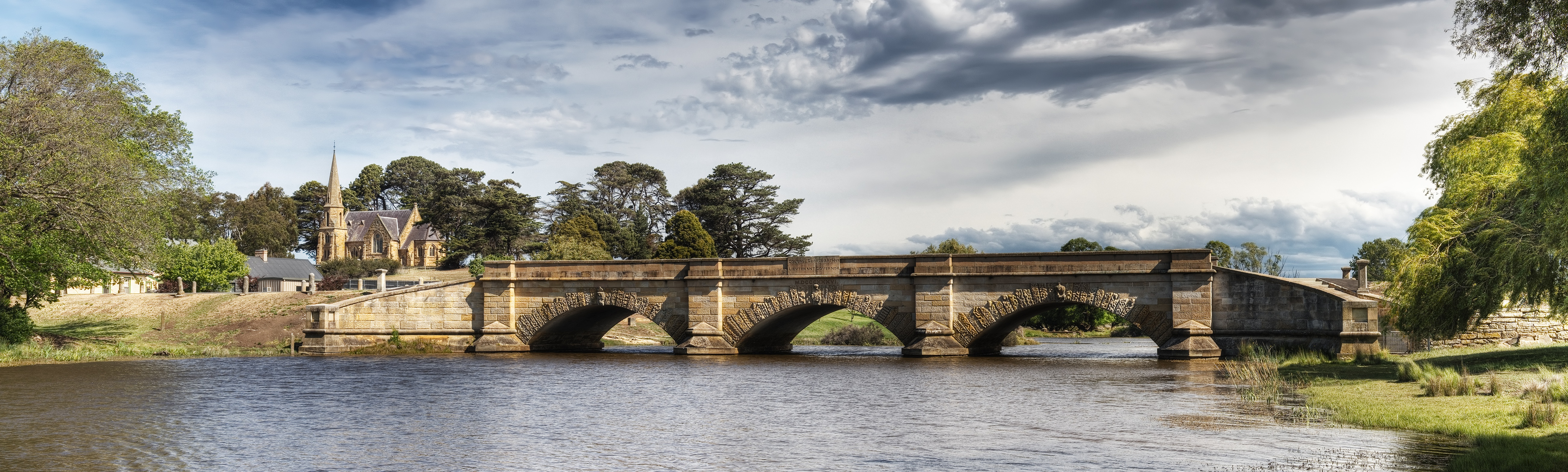
- Ross Bridge with the Uniting Church in the background
- Coordinates: 42°01′51″S 147°29′23″E
- Carries: Motor vehicles
- Crosses: Macquarie River
- Locale: Ross, Tasmania, Australia

Characteristics
- Design: Deck arch bridge
- Material: Sandstone
- No. of spans: 3

History
- Designer: John Lee Archer
- Construction start: 1830
- Construction end: 1836

Statistics

Tasmanian Heritage Register
- Place ID: 7,209
- Status: Permanently Registered

Location
- Interactive map of Ross Bridge

Ross Bridge is an historic bridge in the town of Ross in central Tasmania, Australia, completed in July 1836. It crosses the Macquarie River.

The sandstone bridge was constructed by convict labour, and is the third oldest bridge still in use in Australia. Commissioned by Lieutenant-Governor George Arthur, the bridge was designed by architect John Lee Archer, with the convict work team including two stonemasons, James Colbeck and Daniel Herbert, the latter being credited with the intricate carvings along both sides of the bridge.

The bridge was registered on the now-defunct Register of the National Estate in 1978. Ross Bridge is listed on the Tasmanian Heritage Register and receives protection under the Tasmanian Historic Cultural Heritage Act 1995. Ross Bridge is also a nominated place on the National Heritage List.

The bridge is listed as a National Engineering Landmark by Engineers Australia as part of its Engineering Heritage Recognition Program.

== History ==
Ross Bridge replaced a deteriorating predecessor described by Edward Curr in 1823. The original bridge, consisting of fourteen arches, drystone piers and logs covered with road metal, collapsed in 1831. John Lee Archer proposed a new design with detailed specifications, drawing from his experience working under John Rennie, a well known engineer who worked on the Waterloo and Southwark bridges in London. A gang of convicts stationed at Ross, tasked with bridge maintenance, faced challenges in material pilfering and a shortage of skilled labor. A disagreement arose between the Inspector of Roads and Archer surrounding the new stone arch bridge's location, eventually resolved in June 1832.

In April 1833, Lee Archer finalised the bridge design by reducing the number of arches from five to three, optimizing the location for a rock foundation, crucial for durability against the fast-flowing and flooding Macquarie River. The project was originally led by Superintendent Charles Atkinson, an English architect. However, Atkinson faced challenges, and Captain William Turner took over in 1835, accelerating the bridge's completion. The completed bridge features three segmental arches rising from bold supporting piers with splayed tops, resembling cutwaters. The piers, adorned with weathered and molded copings, extend through the walls and parapets, creating horizontal lines with a molded string course and plain capping. Convict masons James Colbeck and Daniel Herbert played crucial roles, with Herbert credited for the intricate carvings on voussoirs and keystones.

The arches exhibit high-relief carvings on all six faces, showcasing foliage motifs alongside animal and human heads, some adorned with hats, helmets, or crowns. Tudor roses and emblems in plaited cords add to the decorative elements. The carvings satirise people in authority, and have sexual references. Jennie Jackson, a great great-grandchild of Thomas Herbert, a convict who was a quarryman in the Ross Bridge road party, developed a Web site about the bridge, including many very detailed photographs of the carvings taken mostly by Brad Harris in 2020, with explanations. The parapets incorporate recesses for pedestrians to seek shelter from passing vehicles, and wing walls with graceful curves form the side walls of steps leading from the river edges to the road level. Upon completion in July 1836, the bridge was inaugurated by Lieutenant-Governor Arthur in a grand ceremony. The old bridge's centre was blown up, marking the end of an era. The new bridge, enduring floods and increased traffic, remains in use. A comprehensive restoration in 1975-76, conducted by the Department of Main Roads, ensured the bridge's preservation. Additionally, in September 1992, a terrestrial photogrammetric survey, employing a Wild stereometric camera, produced an accurate elevation drawing of the bridge, adding to its historical documentation. A reserved area above the bridge allows travelers to appreciate its splendor, and the memorial stones on the parapets commemorate Lieutenant-Governor Arthur and Captain Turner. There are no memorials for convicts John Lee Archer, James Colbeck, Daniel Herbert, and Charles Atkinson.

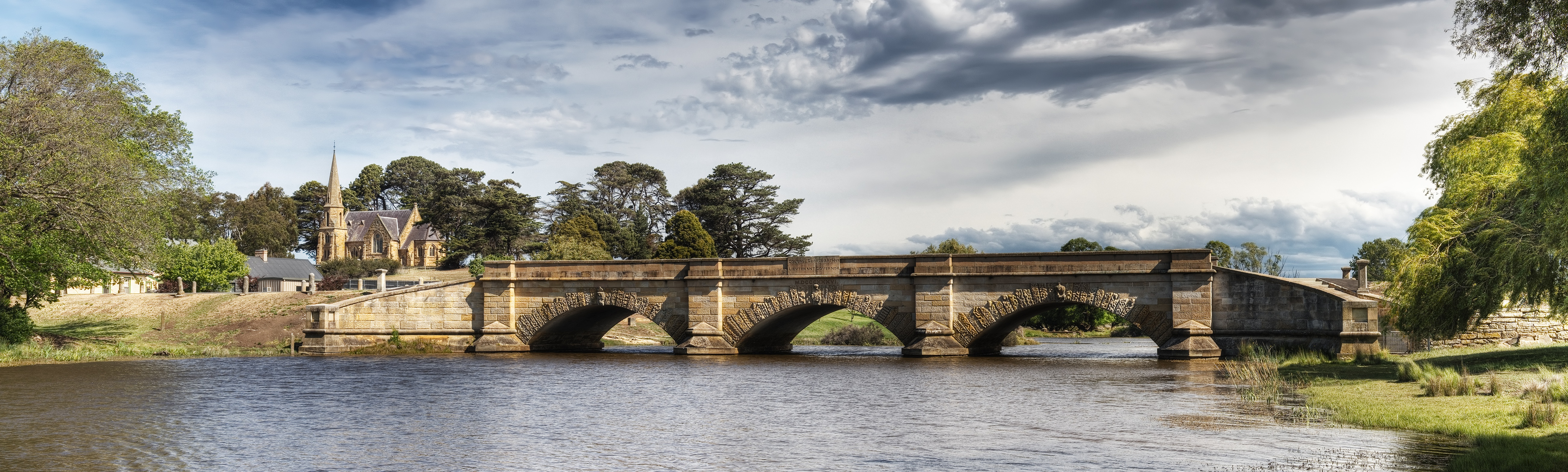
Ross Bridge in 2009

== Satirical statue by Herbert ==
A 1.3 m sandstone statue from about 1836 satirising governor George Arthur, believed to have been carved by Daniel Herbert due to the style matching that of the bridge carvings, was donated in 2023 to Tasmania's Maritime Museum. Arthur is standing, holding his penis, as a statue with plumbing arrangements thought to be part of a fountain which would have had Arthur urinating over the people of the colony.
