= Cornwall Land District =

Coordinates: 41.55°S 147.75°E

Cornwall
- Cadastral division
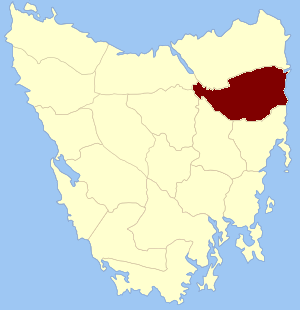
- Location in Tasmania
- Country: Australia
- State: Tasmania
Lands administrative divisions around Cornwall
Devon	Dorset	Tasman Sea
Westmoreland	Cornwall	Tasman Sea
Somerset	Glamorgan	Tasman Sea

Cornwall Land District is one of the twenty land districts of Tasmania which are part of the Cadastral divisions of Tasmania. It contains most of Launceston. It was formerly Cornwall County, one of the 18 counties of Tasmania and one of the first eleven proclaimed in 1836. It was named after the then southwestern county of England.

An earlier Cornwall County existed from 24 September 1804 until 4 February 1813 as an administrative division whilst Van Diemen's Land was administered as two units. It was defined as all of Van Diemen's Land north of the 42nd parallel (now between Trial Harbour and Friendly Beaches), and governed by William Paterson. Buckingham County occupied the remainder of the island. It is bordered to the north by the North Esk River, and to the south by the South Esk River. While most of Launceston is in it, it does not include suburbs to the north of the North Esk such as Mayfield which is in Dorset, and suburbs to the west of the South Esk such as Trevallyn, which is in Devon. It goes east to the Tasman Sea, including St Helens and St Marys.

The 1911 Encyclopædia Britannica mentions Launceston as being in the county.

There was, until 1999, a state electoral division of Cornwall occupying a similar area to the district.

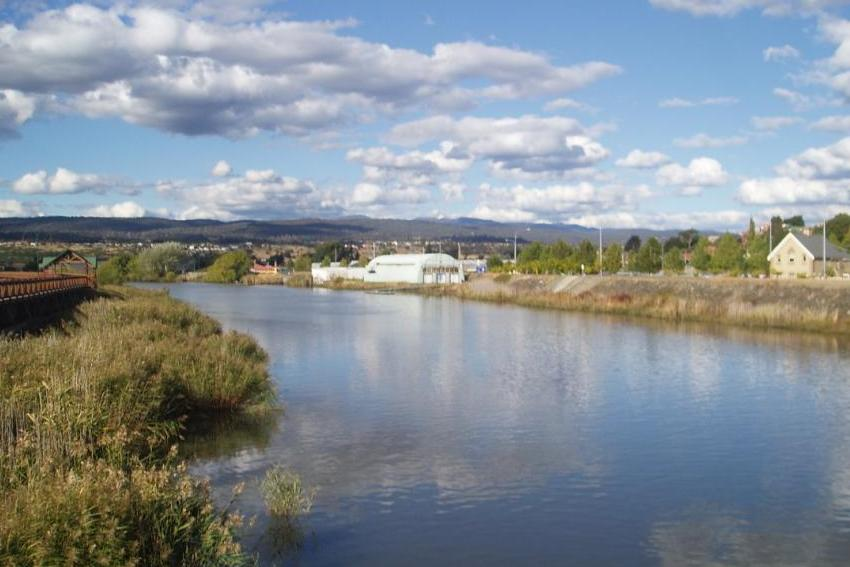
The North Esk River, the boundary between Cornwall and Dorset

== The original parishes ==
On 15 January 1836 George Arthur, the Lieutenant Governor of the Island of Van Diemen's Land, proclaimed, via The Hobart Town Courier, the first counties and parishes to be surveyed in the colony.

The County of Cornwall, bounded on the north by the river North Esk, and by a line connecting that river with George's river and by George's river; on the east by the Pacific ocean; on the south by the South Esk river and by St. Paul's river, and by an eastline from the head of St. Paul's river to the sea coast, and on the west by the South Esk. This county to include all islands situate between the mouth of George's river and the south extremity of the county.

Hundreds and parishes proclaimed at this time were:

- The hundred of Launceston
  - Launceston parish
  - Braedalbane (later corrected to Breadalbane)
  - Perth
  - Evandale
- The hundred of Lymington
  - Lymington
  - Deddington
  - Beverley
  - another parish at present unnamed
- The hundred of Avoca
  - Avoca
  - Trefusis
  - St. Aubyn
  - Malvern

The townships of Launceston, Hadspen, Perth, Avoca (portion of) were delimited in the same proclamation.
