= Lincoln, Tasmania =

Coordinates: 32°27′S 149°02′E

Lincoln Tasmania
- Postcode(s): 7210
- Location: 11 km (7 mi) from Launceston
- LGA(s): Northern Midlands Council
- State electorate(s): Lyons
- Federal division(s): Lyons

Lincoln, Tasmania is a village in Somerset Land District at the junction of the Macquarie and Isis rivers. It is about 95 miles from Hobart, and 30 miles from Launceston. It contains only a few houses.
