= Ormaig =

Ormaig may refer to:

- Ormaig, Tasmania, an administrative division of Tasmania
- Ormaig, a former settlement on the Isle of Ulva
- Ormaig, Argyll; see Knapdale
