= Maitland, Tasmania =

Maitland is a rural locality, former town and a parish of Somerset Land District Tasmania, Australia. It is located on the Isis River.
