= Glamorgan County =

Glamorgan County may refer to:

- the historic county of Glamorgan, Wales
- Glamorgan County RFC
- the former name of Glamorgan Land District, Tasmania, Australia
