= Monmouth Land District =

Monmouth
- Cadastral division
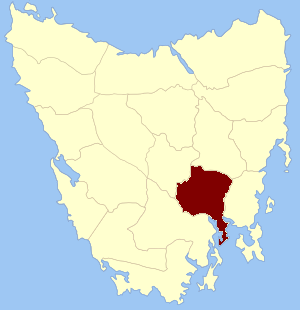
- Location in Tasmania
- Country: Australia
- State: Tasmania
- LGA: City of Clarence
Lands administrative divisions around Monmouth
| Cumberland | Somerset | Somerset |
| Cumberland | Monmouth | Pembroke |
| Buckingham | Buckingham | Storm Bay |

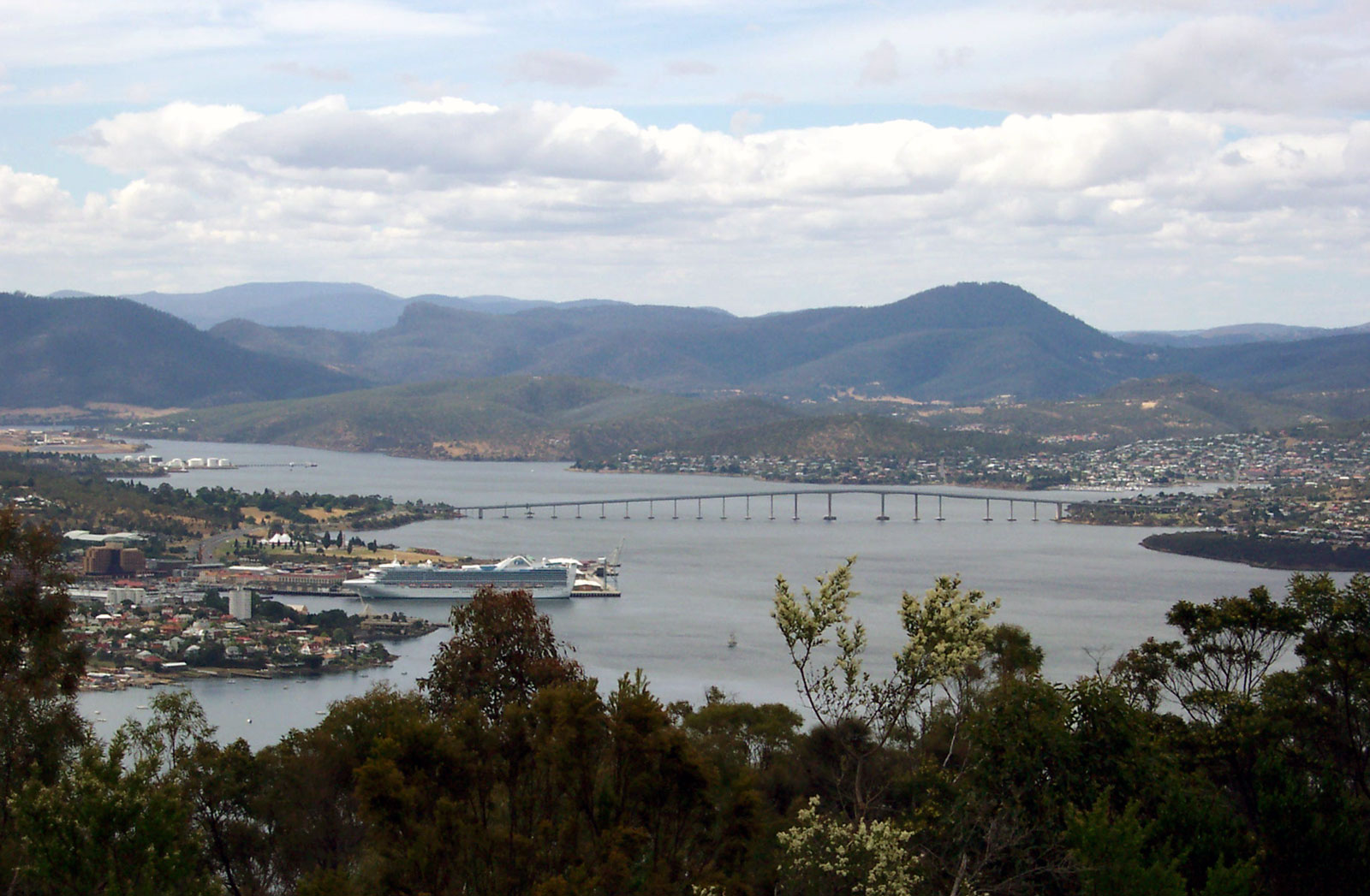
Looking up the River Derwent from Mount Nelson; Monmouth is on the other (east) side of the river; Buckingham is on the near (west) side.

Monmouth Land District is one of the twenty land districts of Tasmania which are part of the cadastral divisions of Tasmania. It was formerly one of the 18 counties of Tasmania. It is bordered by the River Derwent to the south, the Clyde River to the west, and a small part of the Jordan River to the north.

It includes the parts of Greater Hobart which are located to the east of the Derwent, such as Rosny Park and Bridgewater. It also includes Kempton and Hamilton.

== The original parishes ==
On 15 January 1836 George Arthur, the Lieutenant Governor of the Island of Van Diemen's Land proclaimed, via The Hobart Town Courier, the first counties and parishes to be surveyed in the colony.

Eighth, The County of Monmouth, bounded on the north by Somersetshire; on the west by a portion of the Clyde to its junction with the Derwent, and thence on the south west by the Derwent to Storm bay; on the south by Storm bay and Frederick Henry bay; on the east by Pittwater and by the eastern boundaries of the parishes of Ulva, Staffa and Ormaig, and thence by a line to the junction of Beamont's rivulet with Little Swan port river. This county to include Betsey island and the Iron pot island.

Hundreds and parishes proclaimed at this time were

- The hundred of Oatlands
  - Bath
  - York
  - Newick
  - Somerton
- The hundred of Westbury
  - Westbury
  - Quamby
  - Sillwood
  - Adelphi
- The hundred of Apsley
  - Rutland
  - Spring Hill
  - Winterton
  - Apsley
- The hundred of Picton
  - Strangford
  - Dysart
  - Beaufort
  - Huntingdon
- The hundred of Bothwell
  - Vincent
  - Largo
  - Henry
  - Grantham
- The hundred of Hamilton
  - Hamilton
  - Grafton
  - Pelham
  - Stradbroke
- The hundred of Pontville
  - Wallace
  - Lansdowne,
  - Aldville
  - Arundel
- The hundred of Brighton
  - Lewis
  - Staffa
  - Ulva
  - Drummond
- The hundred of Bellerive
  - Forbes
  - Cambridge
  - Clarence
  - Ralph's Bay
- The hundred of Yarlington
  - Ormaig
  - Yarlington
  - unnamed
  - unnamed
