= Devon County =

Devon County may refer to:

- Devon, England, United Kingdom
- the former name of Devon Land District, Tasmania, Australia
