= Isis River (Tasmania) =

River in Tasmania, Australia

Isis
- Location of the Isis River mouth in Tasmania

Location
- Country: Australia
- State: Tasmania
- Region: Midlands (Tasmania)

Physical characteristics
- Source: Mount Franklin
  - location: Great Western Tiers
  - elevation: 833 m (2,733 ft)
- Mouth: Macquarie River
  - location: north west of Campbell Town
  - coordinates: 41°49′4″S 147°14′59″E
  - elevation: 171 m (561 ft)
- Length: 38 km (24 mi)

Basin features
- River system: South Esk River system

The Isis River is a minor perennial river in the Somerset Land District, in the northern region of Tasmania, Australia.

== Location and features ==
The river rises below It starts below Mount Franklin in the Great Western Tiers west of Ross and flows generally north by east before reaching its confluence with the Macquarie River northwest of Campbell Town. The river flows through the settlements of Lincoln and Auburn . The river descends 682 metres (2,238 ft) over its 38-kilometre (24 mi) course.

== See also ==
- Rivers of Tasmania
