= Buckingham County =

Buckingham County may refer to:

- Buckingham County, Lower Canada (1791–1829), a former county in Lower Canada
- Buckingham County, Virginia, United States
- Buckingham Land District, formerly Buckingham County, Tasmania, Australia
- County of Buckingham (South Australia)
- Buckinghamshire, ceremonial county, England, United Kingdom
