= Kent Land District =

Kent Land District may refer to:

- Kent Land District, Tasmania
- Kent Land District, Western Australia
