= Arthur County =

Arthur County may refer to:

- Arthur County, Nebraska
- the former name of Arthur Land District, Tasmania, Australia
