= Llewellyn, Tasmania =

Llewellyn Tasmania
- Coordinates: 41°55′S 147°30′E
- Postcode(s): 7210
- Location: 11 km (7 mi) from {{{location1}}}
- LGA(s): Northern Midlands Council
- State electorate(s): Lyons
- Federal division(s): Lyons

Llewellyn, Tasmania is a small village in Somerset Land District, on the road from Campbell Town, Tasmania to the eastern coast, near the South Esk River.

Llewellyn is often alternatively referred to as Stony Creek, a small tributary of the South Esk. Stony Creek was mentioned in colonial times in reference to the eponymous Tasmanian Aboriginal tribe (the Tyerrernotepanner clan) that still bears this name.

Llewellyn first appears in early newspapers in 1845 as both being surveyed as a township and then also as a site of a murder.

A hotel was opened in Llewellyn in 1873 by a publican from Campbell Town and by 1886 a siding was created, with a trestle bridge over Stony Creek, but, by this time, the inn was decreasingly patronised.

By 1899 the town was busy enough to have hosted two horse race meetings in that year and the village had expanded to include at least two streets, but by 1903 hotel had already closed as business in the area declined. In this year it was recorded that the town had only the school as a public building, with the post office being contiguous with a private residence.

The town now is a ghost of its former self and remains a mapped locality and railway siding.
