= Buckingham Land District =

Coordinates: 42.53°S 147.19°E

Buckingham
- Cadastral division
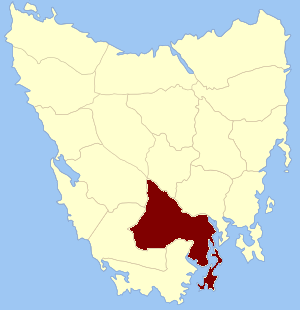
- Location in Tasmania
- Country: Australia
- State: Tasmania
Lands administrative divisions around Buckingham
Lincoln	Cumberland	Monmouth
Franklin	Buckingham	Tasman Sea
Arthur	Kent	Tasman Sea

Buckingham Land District is one of the twenty land districts of Tasmania which are part of the Lands administrative divisions of Tasmania. It was formerly Buckingham County, one of the 18 counties of Tasmania and one of the first eleven proclaimed in 1836 and is bordered to the north by the River Derwent, and to the south by the Huon River. It includes Bruny Island. Hobart is located in the county. It was named after the then county of England.

An earlier Buckingham County existed from 24 September 1804 until 1813 as an administrative division whilst Van Diemen's Land was administered as two units. It was defined as all of Van Diemen's Land south of the 42nd parallel (between Trial Harbour and Friendly Beaches, and governed by David Collins. Cornwall County occupied the remainder of the island.

== The original parishes ==
On 15 January 1836 George Arthur, the Lieutenant Governor of the Island of Van Diemen's Land proclaimed, via The Hobart Town Courier, the first counties and parishes to be surveyed in the colony.

The County of Buckingham, bounded on the north by the river Derwent from its confluence with river Florentine to the sea; on the west by the river Florentine to its source, and thence by a line to the source of the river Huon, and by that river to the sea. This county to include Bruni island, the Egg islands, Huon island, Garden island, Partridge island, Penguin island, Satellite island, Green island, Snake island, Arch island, Actaeon island, and all other islands in D'Entrecasteaux channel.

Hundreds and parishes proclaimed at this time were:

- The hundred of New Norfolk
  - Anglesea parish
  - Uxbridge
  - New Norfolk
  - Wellington
- The hundred of Rugby
  - Sutherland
  - Argyle
  - unnamed
  - unnamed
- The hundred of Hobarton
  - Hobart parish
  - Glenorchy
  - Kingboro'
  - Queenboro'
- The hundred of Bruni
  - Coningham
  - Bruni
  - D'Entrecasteaux
  - unnamed

== Parishes ==
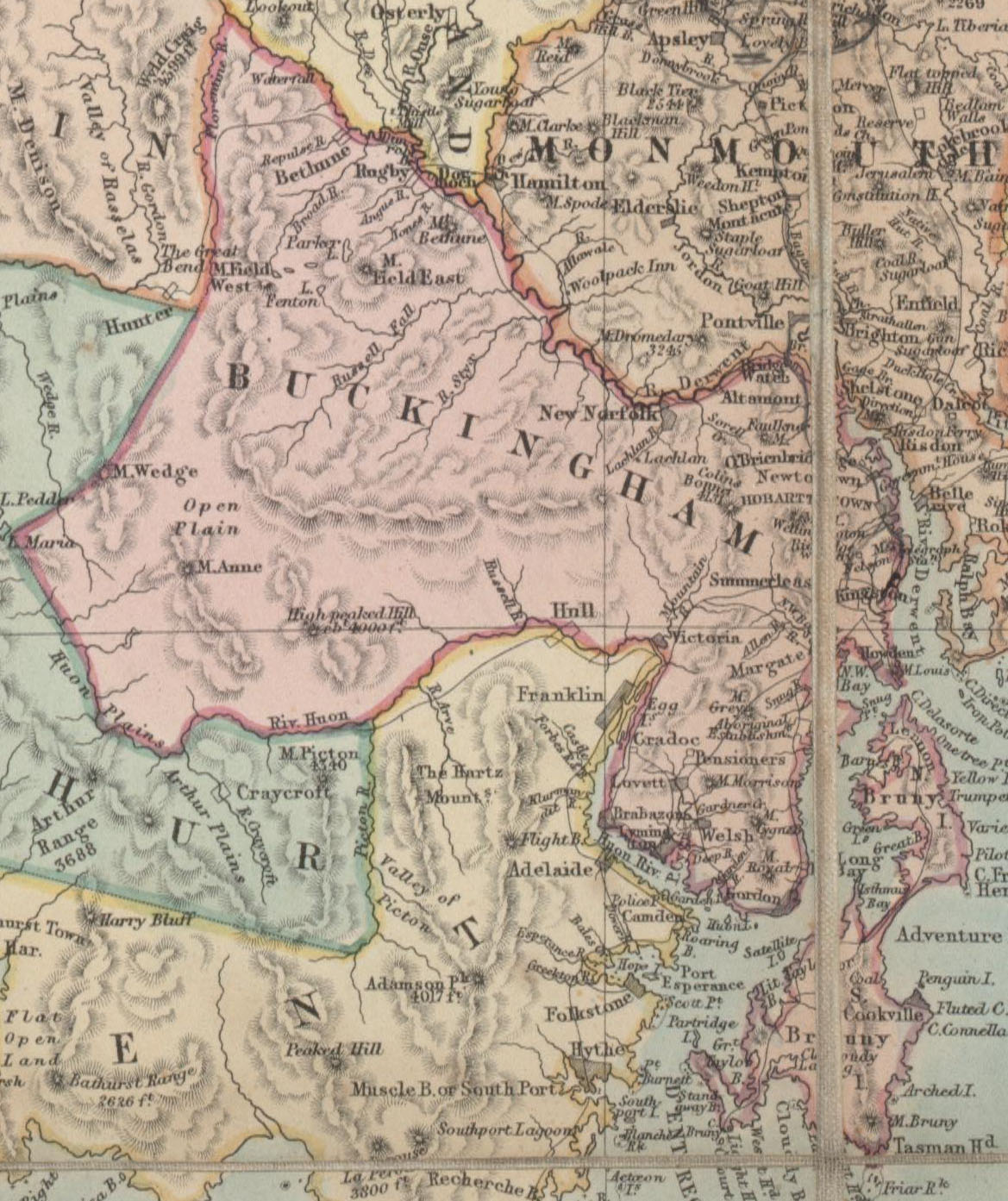
Map of Buckingham county in 1864

The parishes are:

- Anglesea
- Argyle
- Bagot
- Bedford
- Bethune
- Buckingham
- Camden
- Champ
- Conningham
- Glenorchy
- Hobart Town
- Kingborough
- Longley
- Lonna
- Molesworth
- Neena
- New Norfolk
- North Bruny
- Pedder
- Punna
- Queenborough
- Ranelagh
- Rinadena
- South Bruny
- Sutherland
- Throckmorton
- Trinity
- Tyenna
- Uxbridge
- Wellington
