= Wellington Land District =

Wellington Land District may refer to:

- Wellington Land District, Western Australia
- Wellington Land District, Tasmania
- Wellington Land District, New Zealand, for the Wellington and Manawatū-Whanganui regions; see Land Districts of New Zealand.
