= Kent Land District, Tasmania =

Kent
- Cadastral division
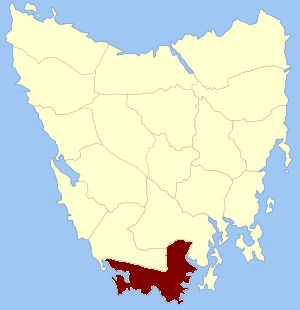
- Location in Tasmania
- Country: Australia
- State: Tasmania
- LGA: Huon Valley Council
Lands administrative divisions around Kent
Arthur	Arthur	Buckingham
Southern Ocean	Kent	Buckingham
Southern Ocean	Southern Ocean	Southern Ocean

Kent Land District is one of the twenty land districts of Tasmania which are part of the Cadastral divisions of Tasmania. It was formerly one of the 18 counties of Tasmania. It is located on the southern tip of Tasmania. It is bordered by the Huon River to the north, and Picton River to the north-west. It includes Dover, Geeveston and Southport, and part of the Southwest National Park.

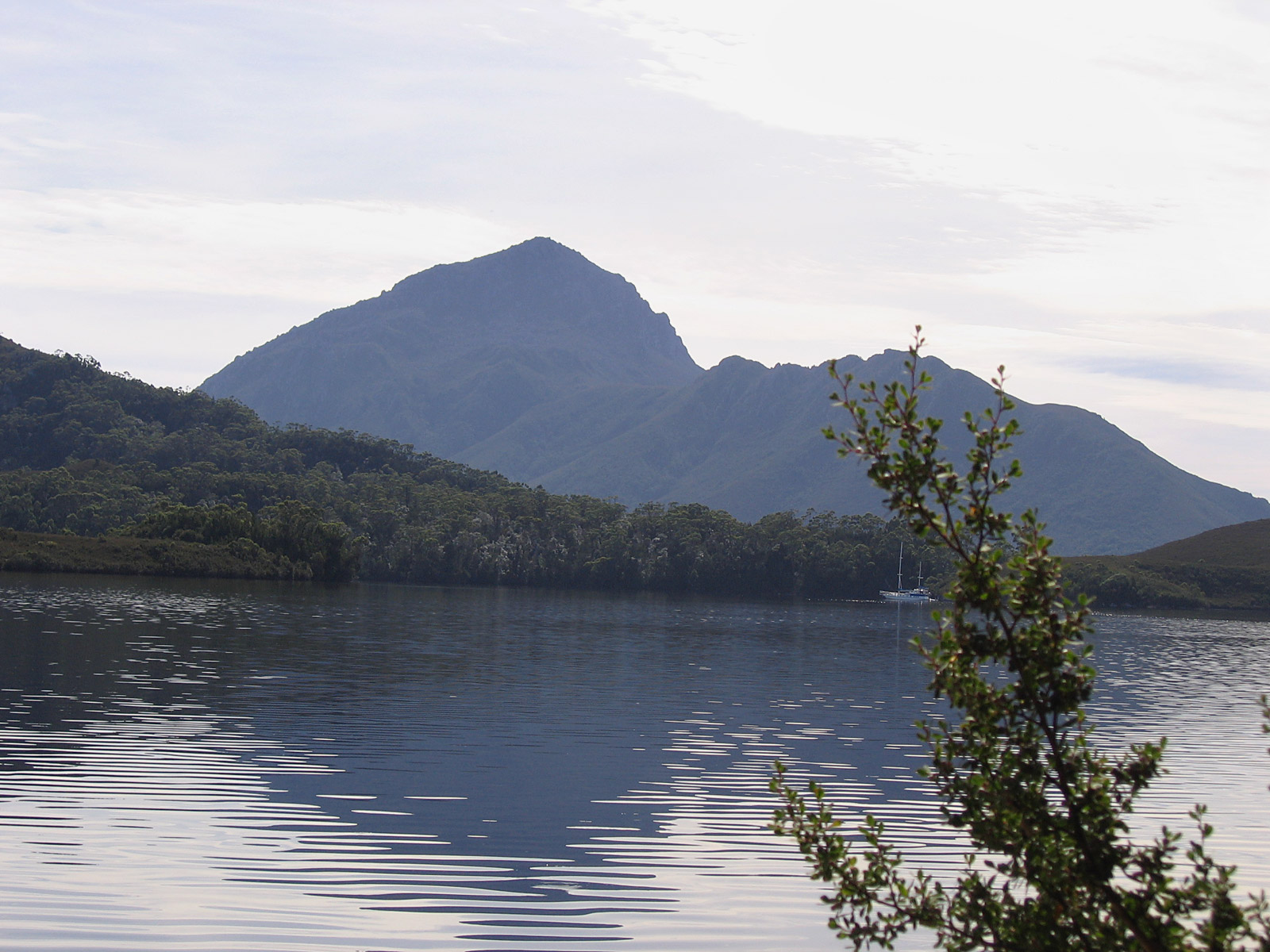
Much of the area is part of the South West Wilderness, such as Bathurst Harbour shown here

== The original parishes ==
On 15 January 1836 George Arthur, the Lieutenant Governor of the Island of Van Diemen's Land proclaimed, via The Hobart Town Courier, the first counties and parishes to be surveyed in the colony.

Ihe County of Kent, bounded on the north bv the river Davey, and by a line to the river Picton, and by that river to its junction with the river Huon, thence on the north and on the east by the river Huon to the sea, and on the south and west by the sea. This county to include all islands situate between Whale head and North Head (Port Davey).

No hundreds and parishes were proclaimed for Kent County at this time.
