= Abercrombie, Tasmania =

Former town in Tasmania, Australia

Coordinates: 33°57′S 149°19′E

Abercrombie, Tasmania is a rural locality, former town and a parish of Somerset Land District Tasmania. It is located at -41.930000305S and 147.410003662E.
