= Montgomery Land District =

Montgomery
- Cadastral division
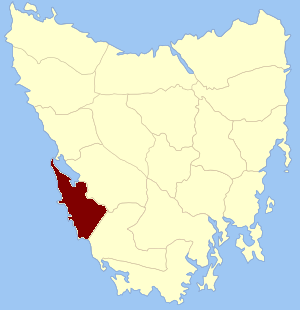
- Location in Tasmania
- Country: Australia
- State: Tasmania
Lands administrative divisions around Montgomery
Southern Ocean	Montagu	Franklin
Southern Ocean	Montgomery	Franklin
Southern Ocean	Southern Ocean	Arthur

Montgomery Land District is one of the twenty land districts of Tasmania which are part of the Cadastral divisions of Tasmania. It was formerly one of the 18 counties of Tasmania. It is bordered by the Gordon River in the north-east and Macquarie Harbour in the north. The land is mostly part of the Southwest Conservation Area in the South West Wilderness.
