= East Grinstead, Tasmania =

East Grinstead, Tasmania is a township in Somerset County, Tasmania about 80 miles from Hobart. It is named after East Grinstead, a Sussex township between London and Eastbourne, England.
