= Daniel Herbert (convict) =

Tasmanian stonemason (died 1868)

Daniel Herbert (c. 1802–1868), a Tasmanian convict, was a skilled stonemason who, with co-convict James Colbeck, oversaw the building of the Ross Bridge and embellished it with interesting and satirical carvings.

His father had been a corporal in the army; Herbert worked as a stonemason and signboard writer. Sentenced to death for highway robbery in 1827, his sentence was commuted to transportation for life.

He worked on government projects for the Engineer's Department for seven years. By 1835 he was employed as overseer of stonemasons on the construction of the new customs house, a service for which he was paid one shilling a day, and was then one of two stonemasons assigned to oversee the completion of a replacement bridge across the Macquarie river at Ross.

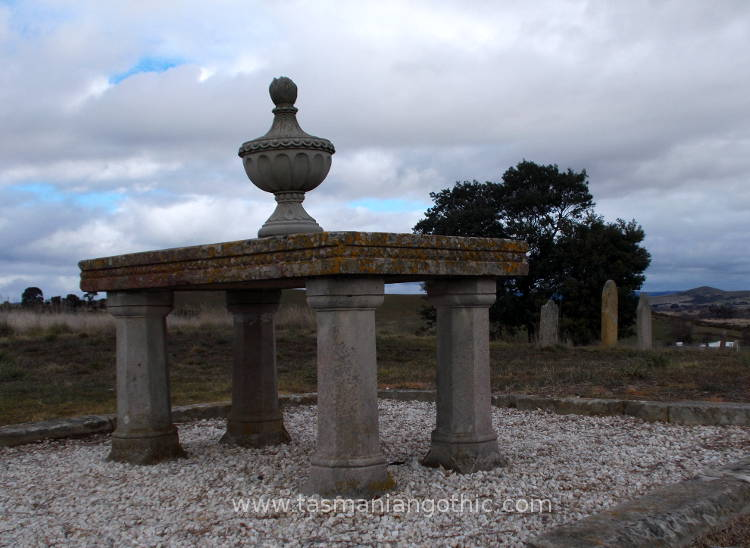
Monument carved by stonemason Daniel Herbert for his own grave in the Old Burial Ground at Ross, Tasmania

The bridge was designed by John Lee Archer, while Herbert oversaw construction with James Colbeck, the other convict stonemason chosen for the job. The bridge was completed in July 1836. It contained 186 keystones or voussoirs carved by Herbert, or completed under his supervision, in fifty-six weeks between May 1835 and July 1836. Various interpretations of their curious motifs have been put forward, including claims that the many carved heads were portraits of Herbert and his wife, eccentric Norwegian convict and explorer Jørgen Jørgensen, Lieutenant-Governor (Sir) George Arthur and other colonial officials and local personalities.

Despite being promised a conditional pardon for successfully completing the task, Herbert asked to be allowed to remain three weeks longer in Hobart to marry Mary Witherington, which he did on 1 July 1835. Herbert was granted a free pardon in February 1842 and continued to live at Ross, where he worked as an ornamental stonemason. He was credited with carving a number of motifs for other buildings in Tasmania, including St Luke's Presbyterian Church, Bothwell, Tasmania. Daniel Herbert died of bronchitis on 28 February 1868 at Campbell Town, survived by his wife; they had three children. Reputedly, he designed and carved his own tomb in the old burial ground at Ross.

Daniel Herbert also carved the sundial at Royal Botanic Gardens in Hobart, commissioned by superintendent William Davidson.

== Satirical statue ==
A 1.3 m sandstone statue from about 1836 satirising governor George Arthur, believed to have been carved by Daniel Herbert due to the style matching that of the bridge carvings, was donated in 2023 to Tasmania's Maritime Museum. Arthur is standing, holding his penis, as a statue with plumbing arrangements thought to be part of a fountain which would have had Arthur urinating over the people of the colony.

== Further reading about the Bridge ==
- R Smith, Early Tasmanian bridges, Launceston, 1969;
- L Newitt, Convicts & carriageways, Hobart, 1988.
