= Ross Female Factory =

Former Australian workhouse for female convicts

Coordinates: 42.032°S 147.492°E

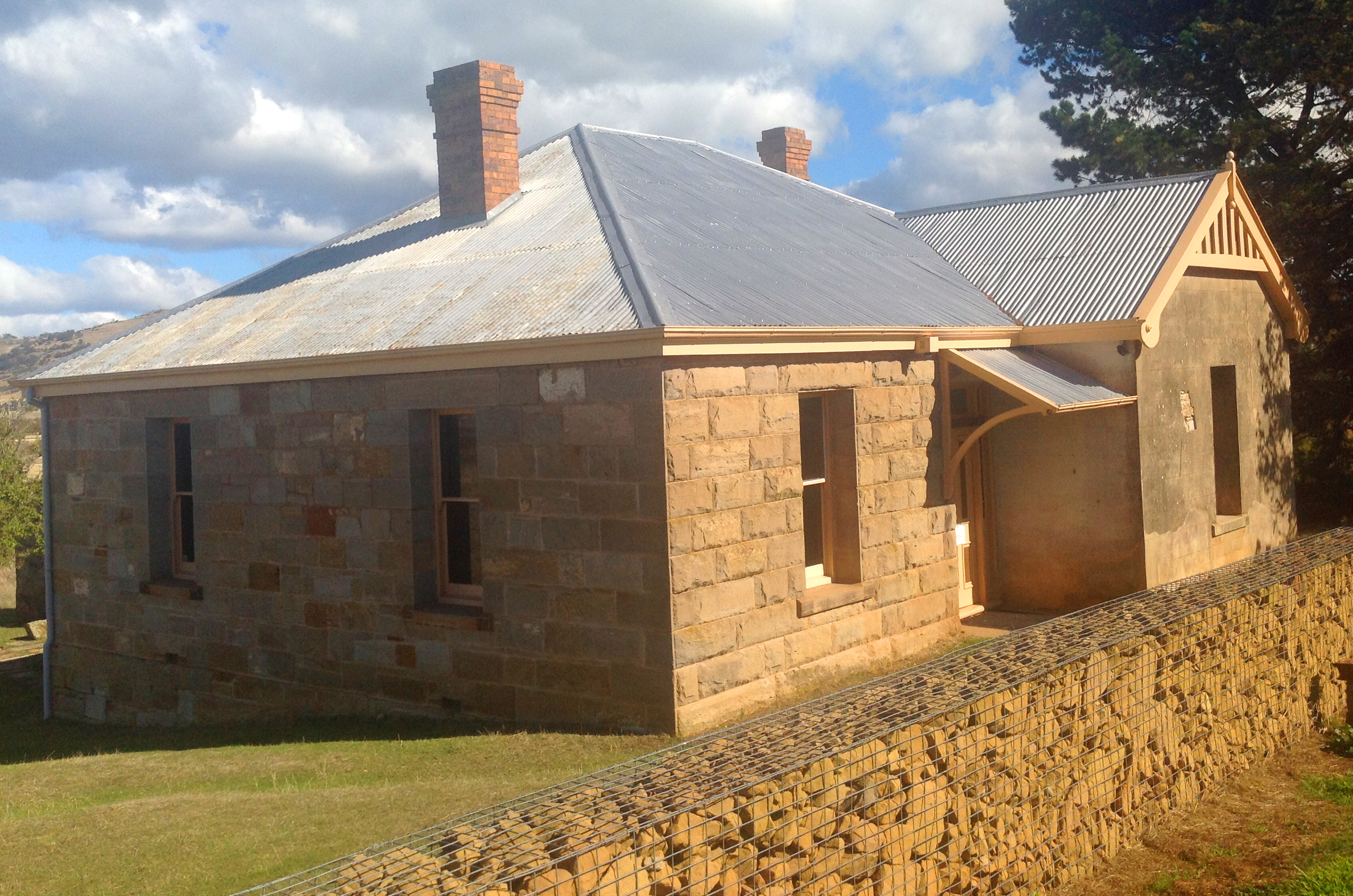
- The Overseer's Cottage, the only building remaining
- Interactive map of Ross Female Factory
- Location: Ross, Tasmania
- Security class: Former female factory, penal colony
- Opened: 1848
- Closed: 1854

The Ross Female Factory, a former Australian workhouse for female convicts in the penal colony of Van Diemen's Land, is located in the village of Ross, in the midlands region of Tasmania. The site was operational between 1848 and 1854.

Collectively, Australia’s convict sites represent an exceptional example of the forced migration of convicts and an extraordinary example of global developments associated with punishment and reform. Representing the female experience, the Ross Female Factory demonstrates how penal transportation was used to expand Britain's spheres of influence, as well as to punish and reform female convicts.

The overseer's cottage is open to public who can get a glimpse of the history of the convict site, which has been kept on display. The archaeological excavations of the site have revealed that the factory was divided into three sections - the Crime Class, the demoted Solitary Cells, and the promoted Hiring Class. These were considered the three stages of reform during the incarceration of the female convicts.

== History ==
The Ross Female Factory opened in March 1848 and closed in November 1854. Transportation to Van Diemen's Land had ceased in 1853. The site served as a factory as well as a hiring depot, an overnight station for female convicts travelling between settlements, a lying-in hospital and a nursery.

Female convicts were hired for many different reasons from the factory as probation passholders to local settlers, mainly to work as domestic servants. They could be sent back to the factory for punishment if they were charged with an offence by their master or mistress.

The first Superintendent to be appointed was Dr William J Irvine; he also acted as the Medical Officer at the Factory. His wife Ann was appointed as Matron.

The Police Department took over use of the buildings after the female factory closed in 1854. The chapel was used by the Roman Catholic Church.

Several archaeological digs have been conducted at Ross Female Factory, under the supervision of Eleanor Casella since 1995.

Hundreds of female convicts passed through the Ross Female Factory during its six and half years of operation. Some of their stories appear in Convict Lives at the Ross Female Factory.
