= Maritime Museum Tasmania =

Maritime museum in Hobart, Australia

Coordinates: 42.8823°S 147.3319°E

Maritime Museum of Tasmania
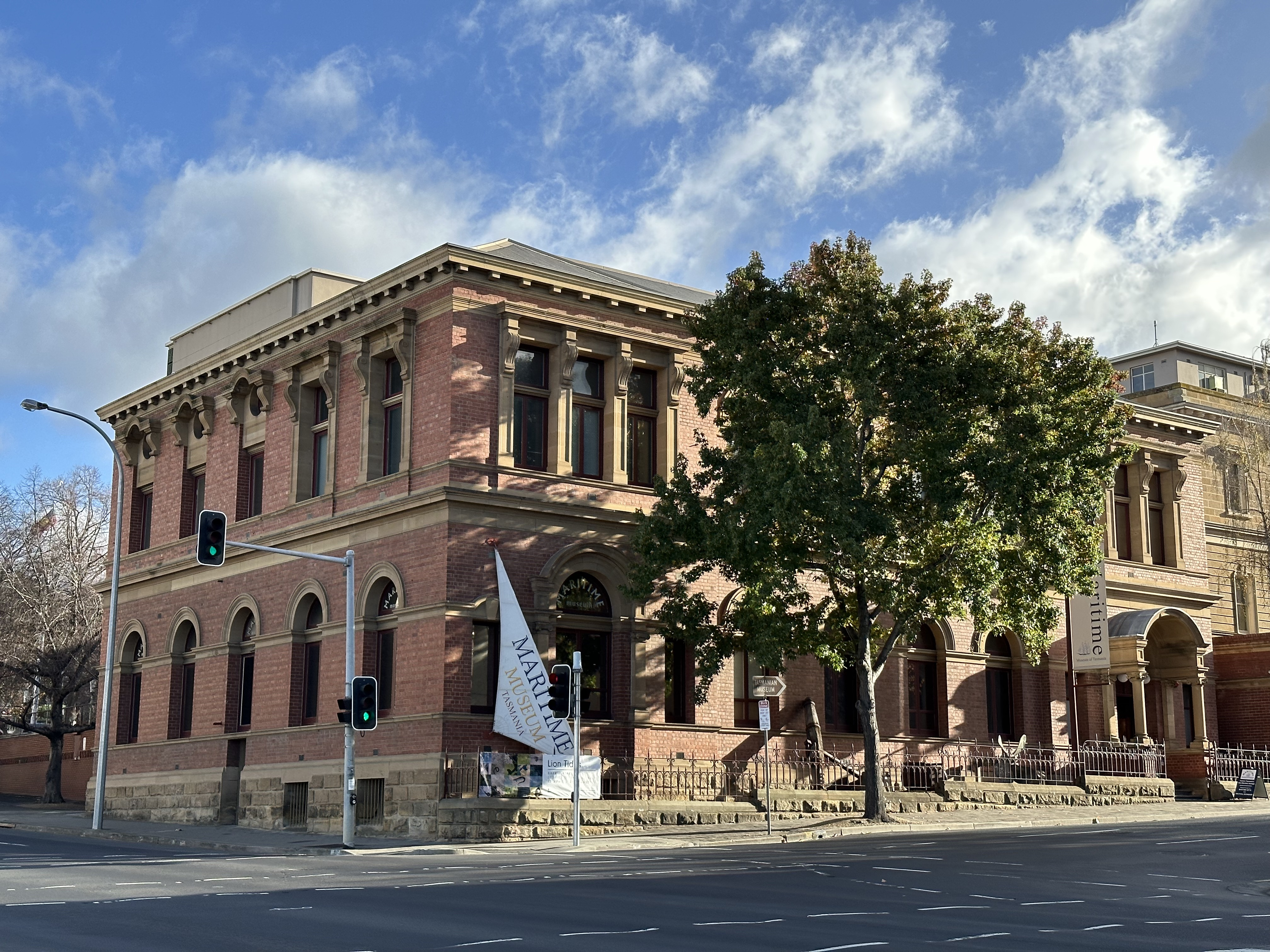
- Established: 1974 (current building 2000)
- Location: Hobart, Tasmania, Australia
- Website: Official website

Maritime Museum Tasmania is a volunteer-run maritime museum dedicated to the history of Tasmania's association with the sea, ships, and ship-building, and is located in Sullivans Cove, Hobart, Tasmania. Established in 1974, the museum has been based in the former Carnegie Library since 2000. Its collections include maritime archaeology, ship models, artworks, photographs, archives, historic objects and a working vessel - the two-time Sydney to Hobart Yacht Race winner, Westward.

== History ==
The island state of Tasmania has a long and rich history of association with the sea, going back well before the time of British invasion and settlement on the island. The indigenous Tasmanians were known to have strong affiliations with the sea and surrounding islands.

The British arrived by sea, and since the time of their first arrival in 1803, Tasmania has had a continuous history of sailing, maritime trade, fishing and other maritime activities.

Maritime enthusiasts first began to argue that the Tasmanian Museum and Art Gallery should include a room dedicated to Tasmania's maritime history in the 1930s. The Shiplovers' Society of Tasmania was established in 1931, and brought together people working in maritime industries and others interested in local history. They began the collection of maritime records, photographs, books and models and in 1936 organised a major Tasmanian Nautical Exhibition at Hobart Town Hall.

During the early 1970s six volunteers from the Shiplovers' Society decided to create a dedicated museum, and the Maritime Museum of Tasmania was born. It was originally housed in St. George's Church, Battery Point, and opened in 1973, with an official opening in 1974. As the collection expanded, the museum moved in 1983 to Secheron House in Battery Point.

The museum relocated to its current home, the Carnegie Building, a former Carnegie library and one of only four in Australia, in 1999. This placed it alongside the docks of Sullivans Cove, in close proximity to both the CBD and the Tasmanian Museum and Art Gallery. The new expanded and modern renovated Carnegie building was opened as the Maritime Museum of Tasmania by Queen Elizabeth II on 28 March 2000.

The Maritime Museum celebrated its 50th anniversary in 2024. In 2025 the Maritime Museum took over the operation of Semaphore Cottage in Princes Park, Battery Point, opening the building as an interpretive centre focusing on Hobart's early semaphore communications system. The cottage also has an earlier connection with the Shiplovers' Society, which participated in a campaign to prevent its demolition in 1936.

== Exhibits ==
A 1.3m sandstone statue from about 1836 satirising Van Diemen's Land governor George Arthur, believed to have been carved by Daniel Herbert due to the style matching that of his Ross Bridge carvings, was donated in 2023 to the museum. Arthur is standing, holding his penis, as a statue with plumbing arrangements thought to be part of a fountain.

== Westward ==
Westward is a Tasmanian-built yacht constructed by Battery Point shipbuilder Jock Muir in 1947. Originally intended as a recreational fishing vessel, it was converted for racing and won the Sydney to Hobart Yacht Race in both 1947 and 1948.

After its racing career, Westward was used as a cruising yacht in the Pacific. It was later returned to Tasmania and donated to Maritime Museum Tasmania in 2010. The vessel has since been restored and maintained as an operational heritage vessel and is the largest object in the museum's collection.

== Publications ==
Maritime Museum Tasmania publishes Maritime Times Tasmania, a journal devoted to Tasmania's maritime history. First published as a newsletter in 1996, it contains historical research, collection stories and feature articles on Tasmanian vessels, ports, maritime industries and people.

== See also ==
- Australian National Maritime Museum
- Shipwrecks of Tasmania
- List of museums in Tasmania
- Sydney to Hobart Yacht Race
