= Dorset Land District =

Dorset
- Cadastral division
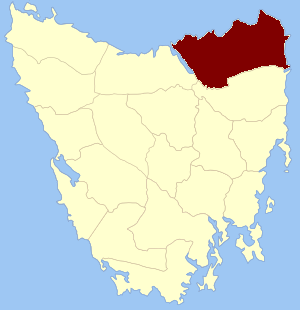
- Location in Tasmania
- Country: Australia
- State: Tasmania
Lands administrative divisions around Dorset
| Bass Strait | Bass Strait | Flinders |
| Devon | Dorset | Tasman Sea |
| Cornwall | Cornwall | Tasman Sea |

Dorset Land District is one of the twenty land districts of Tasmania which are part of the Cadastral divisions of Tasmania. It was formerly one of the 18 counties of Tasmania. It is located at the north-eastern tip of Tasmania. It is bordered by the Tamar River to the west, the George River to the south-east, and the North Esk River to the south. It includes Bridport, George Town and Scottsdale. It also includes some northern suburbs of Launceston. The local government area of the Dorset Council is in a similar region. It is named after the county of Dorset in England, and towns in the area were named after towns in that county.

== The original parishes ==
On 15 January 1836 George Arthur, the Lieutenant Governor of the Island of Van Diemen's Land proclaimed, via The Hobart Town Courier, the first counties and parishes to be surveyed in the colony.

The County of Dorset, bounded on the north by Bass's straits, on the east by the Pacific ocean; on the south by the river North Esk, and a line connecting that river with George's river, and on the west by the Tamar. This county to include Waterhouse island, Swan island and all other islands situate between the mouth of the river Tamar and the mouth of George's river, and whose distance from the coast does not exceed 10 British statute miles.

No hundreds and parishes were proclaimed for Dorset County at this time.
