= Cornwallis, Tasmania =

Cornwallis was a village in the parish of Cornwallis and county of Somerset, about 130 kilometres (81 mi) from Hobart in the nineteenth century.
