= Cumberland Land District =

Cumberland
- Cadastral division
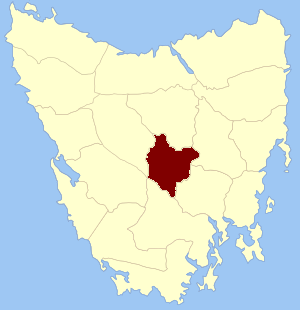
- Location in Tasmania
- Country: Australia
- State: Tasmania
Lands administrative divisions around Cumberland
Lincoln	Westmoreland	Somerset
Franklin	Cumberland	Monmouth
Franklin	Buckingham	Monmouth

Cumberland Land District is one of the twenty land districts of Tasmania which are part of the cadastral divisions of Tasmania. It was formerly one of the 18 counties of Tasmania. It is bordered by the River Derwent to the south, the Clyde River to the east, with Lake Sorell at the north-eastern edge. The Nive River is the boundary to the west. Part of the Shannon River is a section of the boundary to the north, with Great Lake on the northern edge.

== The original parishes ==
On 15 January 1836 George Arthur, the Lieutenant Governor of the Island of Van Diemen's Land proclaimed, via The Hobart Town Courier, the first counties and parishes to be surveyed in the colony.

The County of Cumberland, bounded on the north by the county of Westmoreland; on the east by the river Clyde; on the west by a portion of the river Nive to its confluence with the river Derwent; on the southwest by the river Derwent from its confluence with the river Nive to its confluence with the river Clyde.

Hundreds and parishes proclaimed at this time were:

- The hundred of Lawrenny
  - Lawrenny parish
  - Guilford
  - Abergavenny
  - Amhurst
- The hundred of Ebrington
  - Fortescue
  - Saint Albans
  - Malmsbury
  - Rochford

The townships of Neville, Ebrington, Burford and Rochford were proclaimed as being within the county.
