= Auburn, Tasmania =

Auburn is a village on the Isis River, in the parish of Hill and county of Somerset, Tasmania. It is about 16 kilometres (10 mi) from Campbell Town, Tasmania, 64 km (40 mi) from Launceston, and 121 km (75 mi) from Hobart. Nearby is the remarkable hill called Jacob's Sugar Loaf.
