= Franklin Land District =

District of Tasmania, Australia

Franklin
- Cadastral division
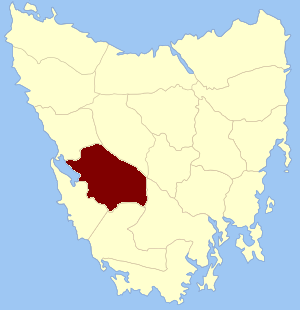
- Location in Tasmania
- Country: Australia
- State: Tasmania
Lands administrative divisions around Franklin
Montagu	Lincoln	Lincoln
Montgomery	Franklin	Cumberland
Montgomery	Arthur	Buckingham

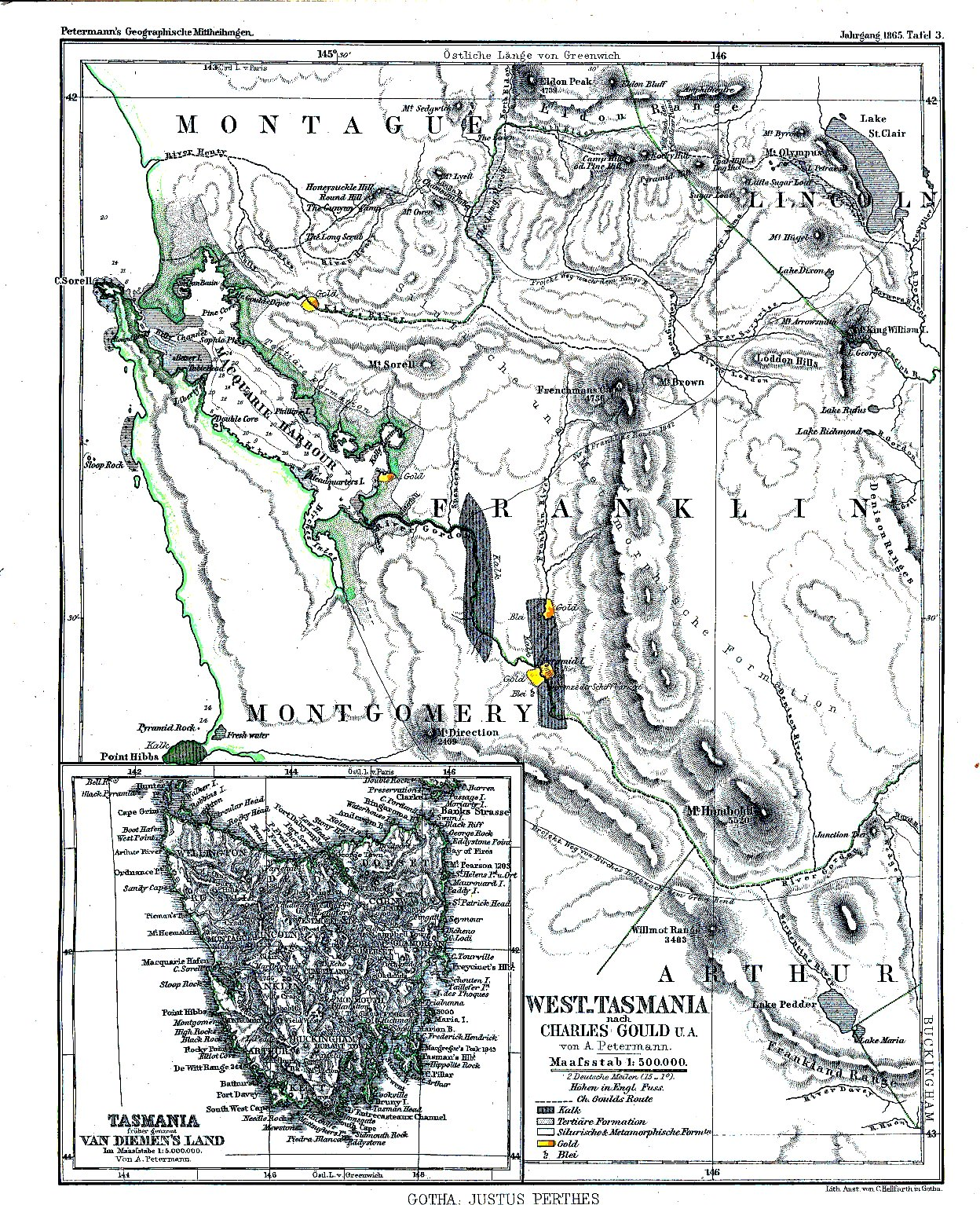
Map of Franklin county and the surrounding area in 1865

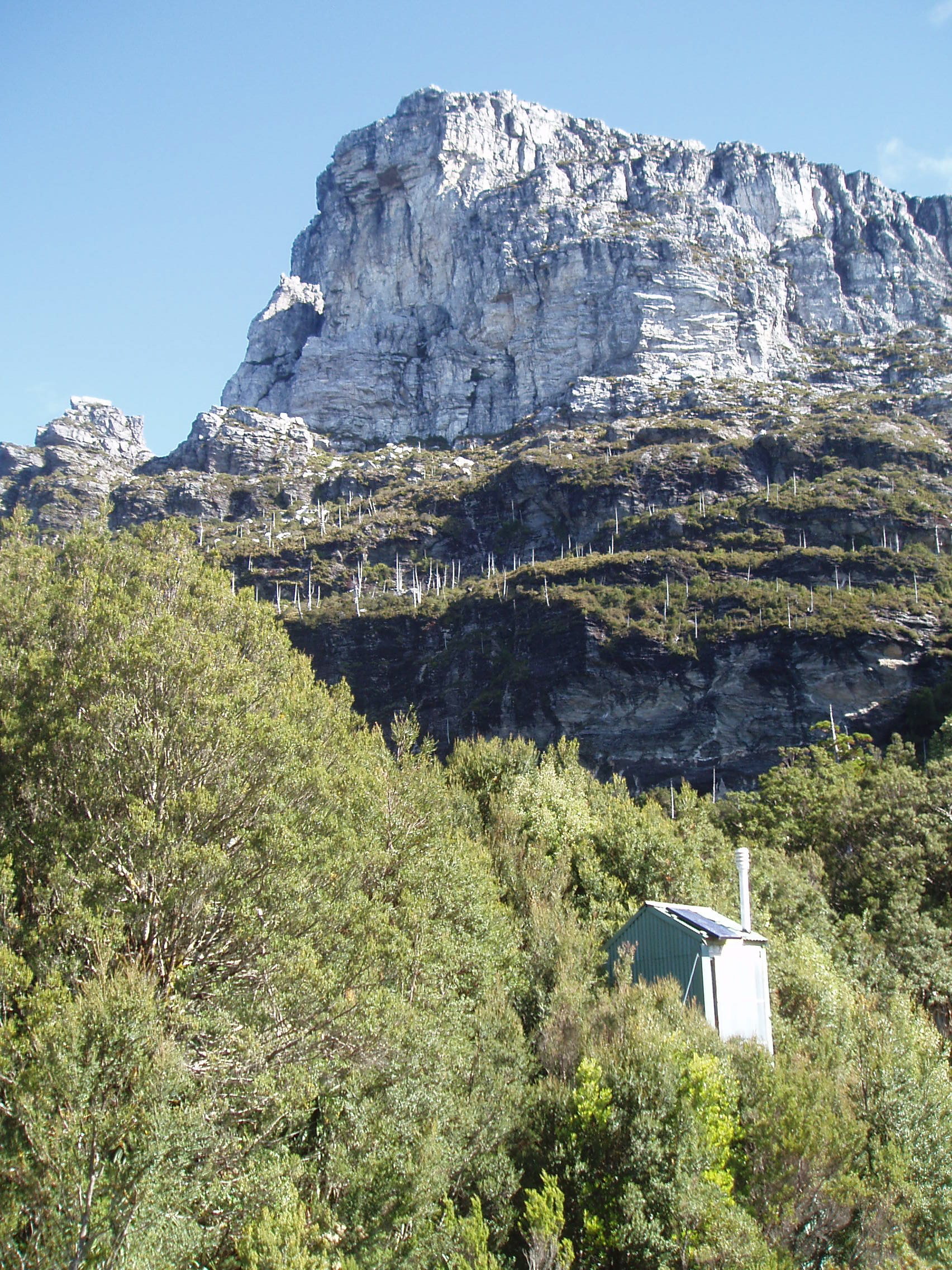
Frenchmans Cap, located within the district

Franklin Land District is one of the twenty land districts of Tasmania which are part of the cadastral divisions of Tasmania. It used to be Franklin County, one of the 18 counties of Tasmania. Frenchmans Cap mountain is located there. It includes most of the Franklin–Gordon Wild Rivers National Park.

== See also ==
- Lands administrative divisions of Australia
