= Glamorgan Land District =

Glamorgan
- Cadastral division
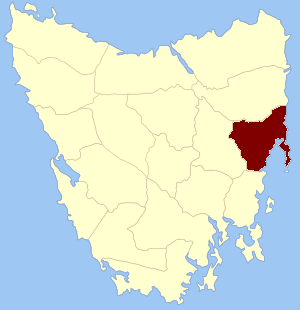
- Location in Tasmania
- Country: Australia
- State: Tasmania
Lands administrative divisions around Glamorgan
Cornwall	Cornwall	Tasman Sea
Somerset	Glamorgan	Tasman Sea
Somerset	Pembroke	Tasman Sea

Glamorgan Land District is one of the twenty land districts of Tasmania which are part of the Cadastral divisions of Tasmania. It was formerly one of the 18 counties of Tasmania. It is located along the eastern edge of Tasmania, from Seymour in the north, to Pontypool in the south. It includes Swansea, Bicheno, Cranbrook, and Lisdillon. It also includes the area around Great Oyster Bay, the Freycinet Peninsula and Schouten Island. The LGA of Glamorgan Spring Bay Council is in a similar region.

== The original parishes ==
On 15 January 1836 George Arthur, the lieutenant governor of the Island of Van Diemen's Land proclaimed, via The Hobart Town Courier, the first counties and parishes to be surveyed in the colony.

The County of Glamorgan, bounded on the north by a portion of the county of Cornwall; on the east by the Pacific ocean; on the south by Little Swanport river, and on the west by the county of Somerset. This county to include all islands on the east coast thereof, and the Schoutens and all islands in Oyster bay not lying further southward than the Schoutens.

Only 1 hundred and two parishes were proclaimed at this time:

- The hundred of Eastbourne
  - Eastbourne parish
  - Glastonbury
  - unnamed
  - unnamed

The townships of Eastbourne, Avoca (portion of) were proclaimed as being within the county.
