= Ross, Tasmania =

Ross
- Town
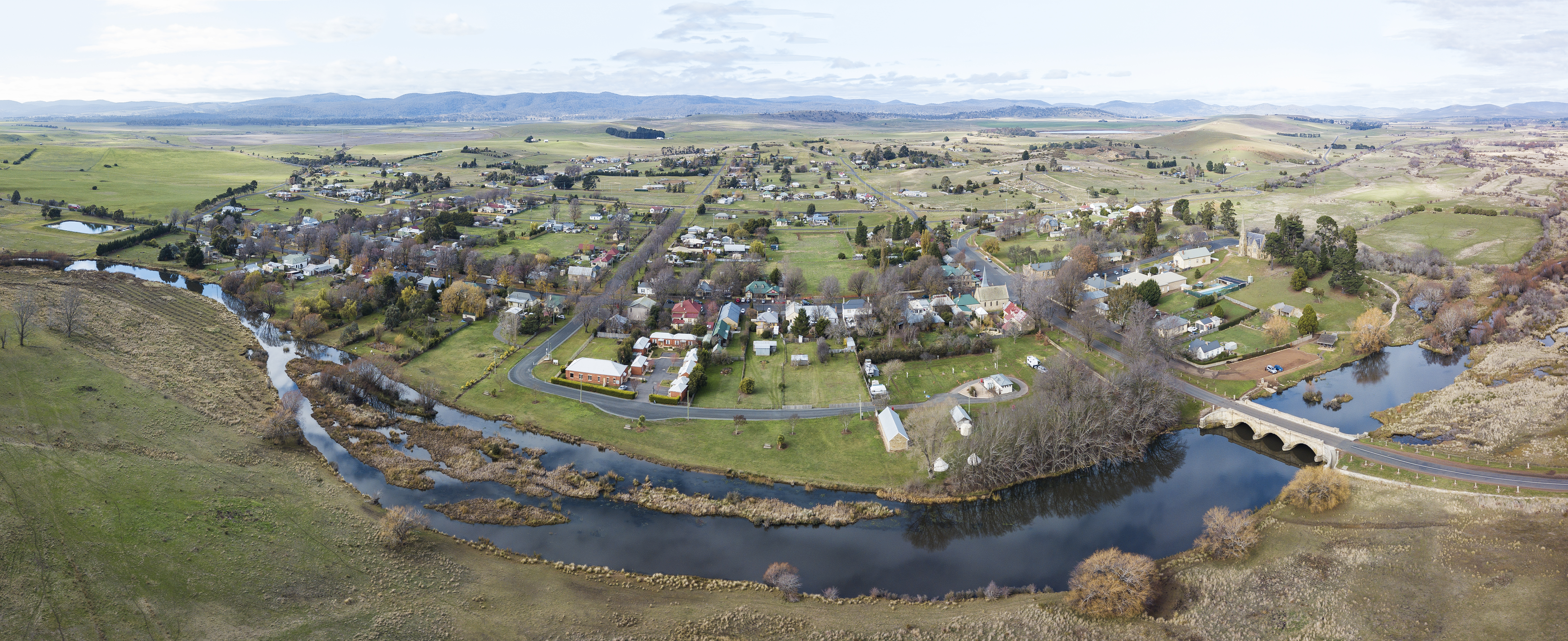
- Aerial panorama of Ross

- Coordinates: 42°01′48″S 147°29′31″E
- Country: Australia
- State: Tasmania
- LGA: Northern Midlands Council
- Location: 78 km (48 mi) from Launceston; 117 km (73 mi) from Hobart
- Established: 1812

Government
  - State electorate: Lyons
  - Federal division: Lyons
- Elevation: 186 m (610 ft)

Population
  - Total: 404 (2016 census)
- Postcode: 7209
- Mean max temp: 17.5 °C (63.5 °F)
- Mean min temp: 5.5 °C (41.9 °F)
- Annual rainfall: 490.1 mm (19.30 in)

Ross is a village in the Midlands of the state of Tasmania in Australia. On the Macquarie River, Ross is located 78 km south of Launceston and 117 km north of Hobart. The town is listed on the Register of the National Estate and is noted for its historic bridge, original sandstone buildings and convict history.

== History ==
The town of Ross lies in lands that were traditionally owned by Aboriginal Tasmanians, specifically the Tyrernotepanner (Stony Creek) Nation. The Aboriginal name for the area that now constitutes the Ross township is Makala (Mah kah lah).

The first European to explore the district was surveyor Charles Grimes who passed through the area while mapping Tasmania's central area including parts of what later became known as the Macquarie River. On an expedition in 1821, Governor Lachlan Macquarie passed through the area himself, naming it after Ross Priory, seat of Hector McDonald Buchanan, as he recorded in his journal,

I named our last Night's Station "Ross", in honor of H. M. Buchanan Esqr. – that being the name of his Seat on Loch-Lomond in Scotland; this part of Argyle Plains on the Right Bank of the Macquarie River being very beautiful and commanding a noble view.

Later that year, a timber bridge was built over the river and subsequently Ross became an important stopover on road journeys between Launceston and Hobart. Shortly afterward, cattle were being run on Crown land at Ross, to be used as working bullocks, and others were used as milch cows for people holding government posts. Ross developed as a base for the local garrison and became a centre for trade for the surrounding district. Between 1848 and 1854 approximately 12,000 female convicts passed through the Female Factory.

Ross Post Office opened on 1 June 1832. In 1836 the stone bridge, known as Ross Bridge, was completed.

By the time of Australian Federation in 1901, the permanent population had grown to 311 and the wider area had become known as a fine wool growing district. At this time Ross had four churches, a post and telegraph office, a savings bank, one hotel, and a town hall and library.

== Climate ==
Climate data for Ross (1991–2020 normals, extremes 1993–present)
Month	Jan	Feb	Mar	Apr	May	Jun	Jul	Aug	Sep	Oct	Nov	Dec	Year
Record high °C (°F)	41.6 (106.9)	36.6 (97.9)	35.3 (95.5)	28.9 (84.0)	22.5 (72.5)	18.7 (65.7)	17.6 (63.7)	19.6 (67.3)	23.2 (73.8)	29.2 (84.6)	33.1 (91.6)	37.8 (100.0)	41.6 (106.9)
Mean daily maximum °C (°F)	24.8 (76.6)	24.0 (75.2)	21.8 (71.2)	17.6 (63.7)	14.3 (57.7)	11.7 (53.1)	11.3 (52.3)	12.5 (54.5)	14.6 (58.3)	17.2 (63.0)	20.1 (68.2)	22.8 (73.0)	17.7 (63.9)
Daily mean °C (°F)	17.8 (64.0)	17.3 (63.1)	15.0 (59.0)	11.6 (52.9)	8.8 (47.8)	6.7 (44.1)	6.4 (43.5)	7.3 (45.1)	9.1 (48.4)	11.1 (52.0)	13.6 (56.5)	15.8 (60.4)	11.7 (53.1)
Mean daily minimum °C (°F)	10.7 (51.3)	10.6 (51.1)	8.2 (46.8)	5.6 (42.1)	3.4 (38.1)	1.7 (35.1)	1.4 (34.5)	2.1 (35.8)	3.6 (38.5)	5.0 (41.0)	7.0 (44.6)	8.8 (47.8)	5.7 (42.3)
Record low °C (°F)	−0.4 (31.3)	−0.2 (31.6)	−3.3 (26.1)	−5.6 (21.9)	−6.9 (19.6)	−7.0 (19.4)	−7.6 (18.3)	−6.3 (20.7)	−6.4 (20.5)	−5.6 (21.9)	−3.2 (26.2)	−2.5 (27.5)	−7.6 (18.3)
Average precipitation mm (inches)	43.9 (1.73)	36.2 (1.43)	37.4 (1.47)	36.7 (1.44)	33.1 (1.30)	39.8 (1.57)	41.1 (1.62)	46.7 (1.84)	49.7 (1.96)	43.4 (1.71)	44.9 (1.77)	39.3 (1.55)	492.3 (19.38)
Average precipitation days (≥ 1 mm)	4.7	5.1	5.4	6.3	6.5	7.3	8.4	8.4	9.1	8.3	6.8	6.2	82.4
Average dew point °C (°F)	8.7 (47.7)	9.6 (49.3)	8.3 (46.9)	7.0 (44.6)	5.6 (42.1)	4.3 (39.7)	3.9 (39.0)	3.9 (39.0)	4.9 (40.8)	5.8 (42.4)	7.0 (44.6)	7.3 (45.1)	6.4 (43.5)
Source 1: National Oceanic and Atmospheric Administration
Source 2: Bureau of Meteorology

== The Four Corners of Ross ==
The town is centred on the crossroads of Church and Bridge Streets with a field gun from the Boer War and a war memorial as a central part of the intersection. The crossroads area is humorously referred to as the "Four Corners of Ross" with each corner having a label:

- Temptation: the Man O' Ross Hotel
- Recreation: Northern Midlands Council Old Town Hall (now the closest one is Longford Town Hall)
- Salvation: Roman Catholic Church
- Damnation: Jail (now a private residence)

== Heritage-listed buildings and sites ==
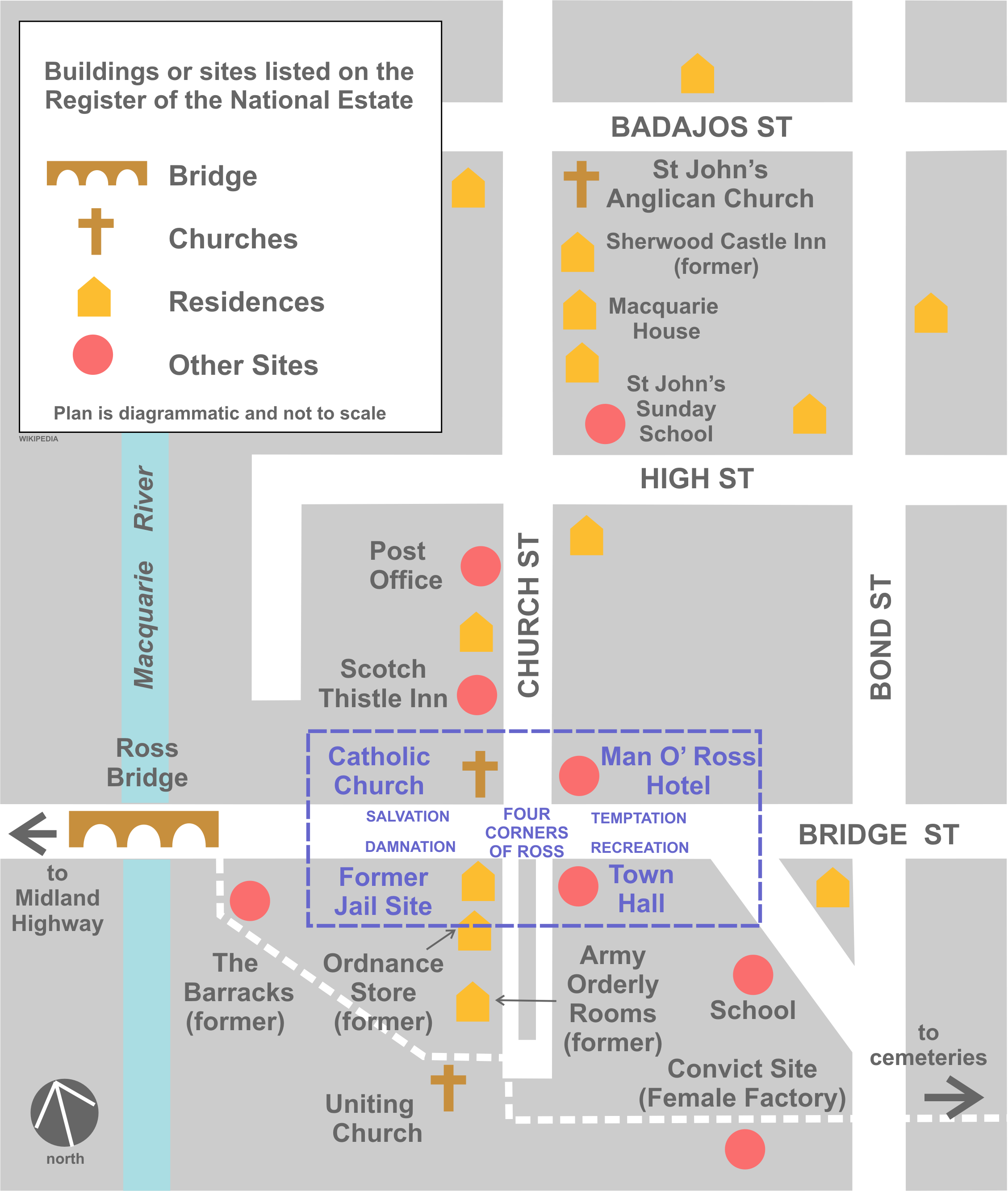
Heritage-listed buildings and sites in Ross

The town of Ross itself is listed on the Register of the National Estate and many of the town's historic buildings, many built from sandstone, are listed in their own right.

=== Former military and police buildings ===
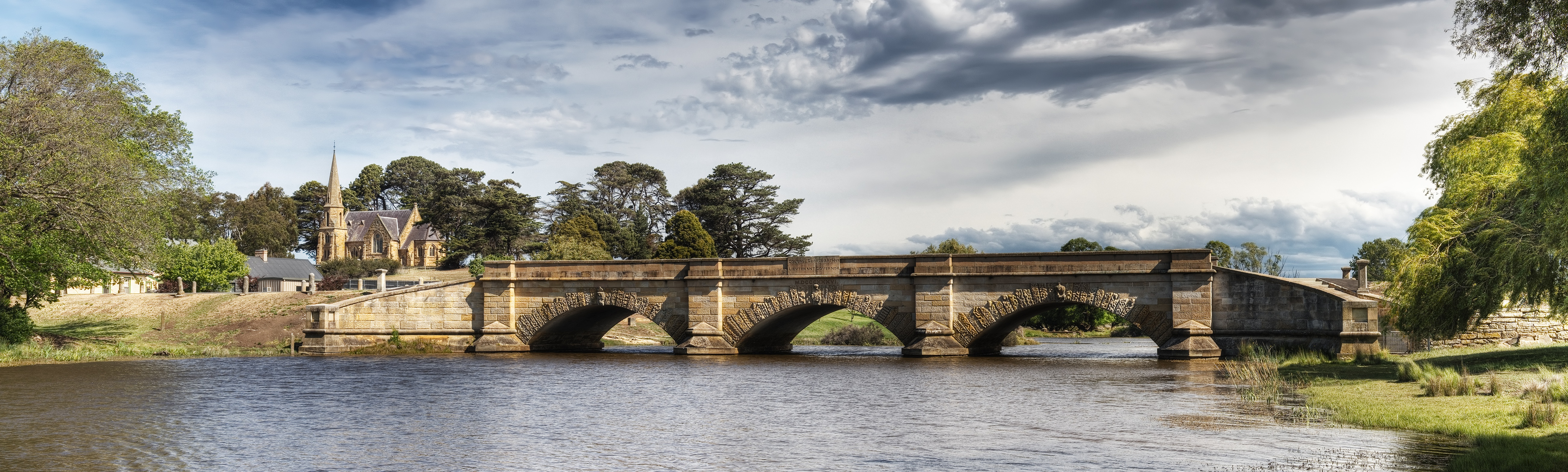
Ross Bridge with the Uniting Church in the background

The former Army Orderly Room is a stone Colonial building which was the first army headquarters in Ross. Nearby is the Royal Ordnance Corps Store, which was erected in 1836 and has the corps crest carved above the door. In 1951 this building was officially opened as the Ross War Memorial Building. It was extended to house the Ross Memorial Library, a large Reading Room and a Recreation Room for use by World War Two Servicemen.

The Council Clerk's cottage, situated on the south-west corner of Church and Bridge Streets is a single storey Georgian building. The western wing of this building incorporates the former police buildings. A jail also stood on this site.

Near the Ross Bridge stands the former military barracks, a single-storey Colonial building which has been recently restored.

During World War II, Ross was the location of RAAF No.30 Inland Aircraft Fuel Depot (IAFD), built in 1942 and closed on 14 June 1944. It was situated on Tooms Lake Road. Usually consisting of 4 tanks, 31 fuel depots were built across Australia for the storage and supply of aircraft fuel for the RAAF and the US Army Air Forces at a total cost of £900,000 ($1,800,000).

=== Convict site ===
The convict site dates back to the 1840s. Usually referred to as the Female Factory, it was one of only a few female convict compounds in Australia. There is one remaining building on the site, the Assistant Superintendent's Quarters, which currently houses a display relating to the site.

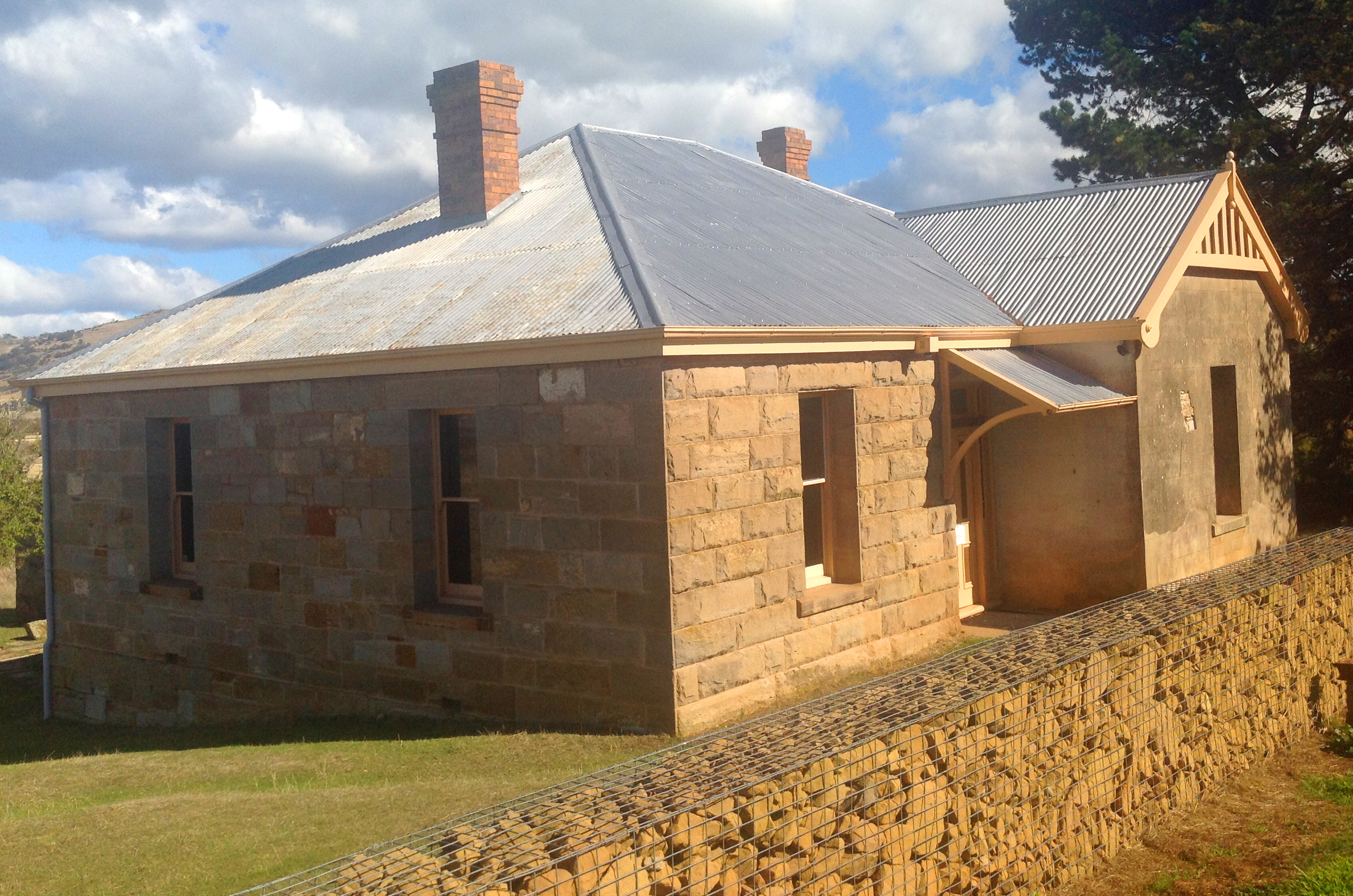
Female Factory in Ross, Tasmania

=== Churches ===
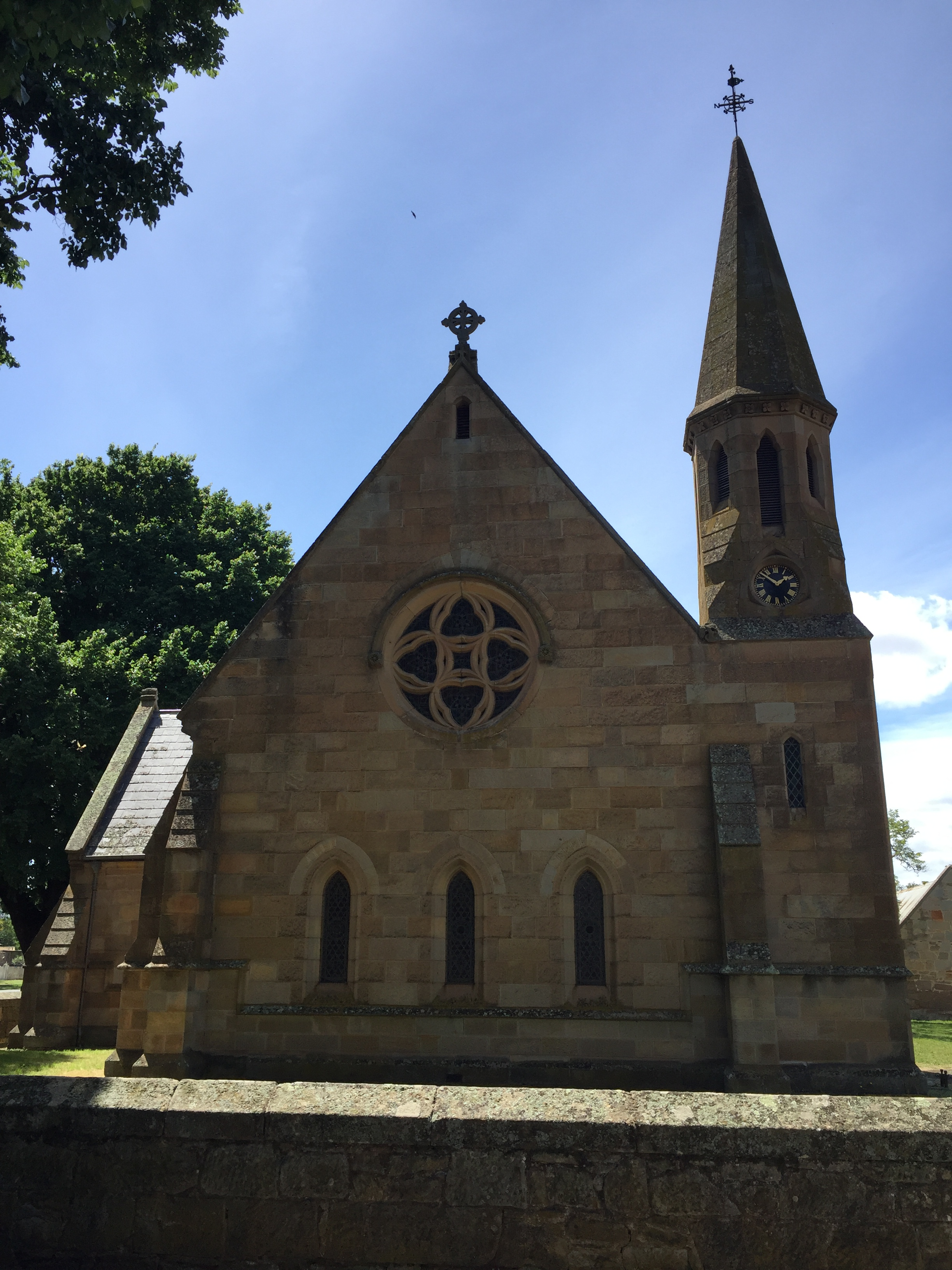
St John's Anglican Church in Ross, Tasmania

The town of Ross has three churches, all located on elm-lined Church Street. The Uniting Church, situated prominently on the hilltop, was built in 1885 and is noted for its blackwood pews and carved baptismal font. The Roman Catholic Church building was originally a store and was converted in the 1920s in Gothic revival style. St John's Anglican Church, on the corner of Badajos Street, was built in 1868 and contains a 100-year-old pipe organ, an oak lectern and a stone pulpit.

=== Hotels and Inns ===
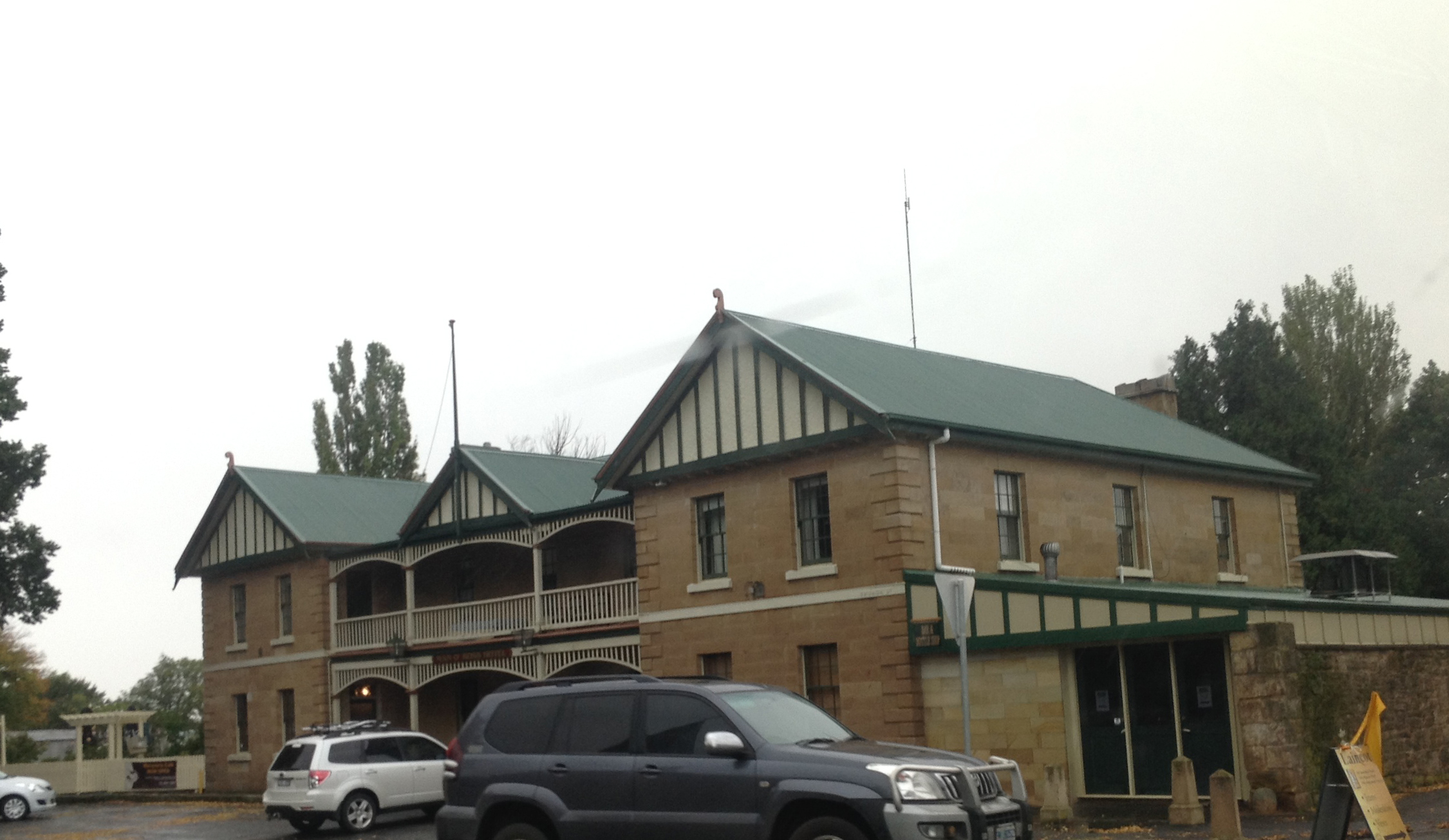
Man O' Ross Hotel (1831) Ross

The Man O' Ross Hotel was built in 1831 by William Sadler. It was originally a two-storey Georgian building, but was later converted to a Victorian Style. Two former inns, The Scotch Thistle Inn (licensed 1840) and the Sherwood Castle Inn, no longer function as hotels, the former is now a private residence and the latter has been renamed and operates as the Ross Bakery Inn.

=== Ross Bridge ===
The well-known sandstone Ross Bridge was constructed by convict labour in 1836, and is the third oldest bridge still in use in Australia. Commissioned by Lieutenant-Governor Arthur, the bridge was designed by architect John Lee Archer, with the convict work team including two stonemasons, James Colbeck and Daniel Herbert, the latter being credited with the intricate carvings along both sides of the bridge.

=== Cemeteries ===
The main cemetery, located to the south-east of the town centre, is divided into two sections – a Roman Catholic section and a Church of England section which is enclosed by a stone wall. The old military burial ground is located on a nearby hilltop.

=== Other public buildings ===
The Town Hall is a neo-classical style late-Victorian building. The adjoining Council Chambers is a timber building with a stone façade. The Post Office was completed in 1889 and has a verandah with twin cast-iron columns. The schoolhouse is a Victorian Rustic Gothic building with random rubble sandstone walls.

=== Other buildings and sites ===
Within the central township area, there are a number of other buildings including private residences and two former Sunday Schools that are also listed on the register. In addition, a number of listed indigenous and other sites are located in nearby areas.

The ruined remains of the former Horton College (1855–1894) near Ross were also listed.

== Amenities ==
The Tasmanian Wool Centre is a building which houses a museum, a wool exhibition, a wool and craft area and acts as the tourist information centre.

Tooms Lake was built as a water supply dam for Ross.

== The Ross Village Bakery/Kiki's Delivery Service ==
The Ross Village Bakery in Ross has become a point of interest for anime fans, as it has long been said to be the real bakery that inspired the bakery depicted in the 1989 Studio Ghibli animated film Kiki's Delivery Service. An attic room above the bakery has been modified to look like the title character's bedroom.

Fans of the anime, many from Japan and around the world, come to the bakery as an almost pilgrimage. Bakery staff allow the visitors to see the oven and the character's bedroom.

The Bakery is the original bakery for the town of Ross, and was built in 1860, with the original wood-fired oven.
