= James Colbeck =

James Colbeck was the lead stonemason on the Ross Bridge, Ross, Tasmania. Both he and Daniel Herbert received full pardons for their work on the bridge.

Born in Dewsbury in the West Riding of Yorkshire in 1801, Colbeck worked as a stonemason in London on Buckingham Palace from 1822 to 1825. Newly married and with a young son, Colbeck grew tired of living apart from his wife and child, and returned to Dewsbury.

Unable to find work in the area and desperate to feed his starving family, Colbeck, John Blezzard and George May broke into a house in Huddersfield stealing food, clothing and money. Having succeeded once, they repeated their rash act again in a home in Saddleworth and were caught.

Sentenced at the York Assizes on 22 March 1828 to transportation for life for burglary, Colbeck was shipped from London to Van Diemen's Land (Tasmania) aboard the Manlius.

In 1830 and 1831, Colbeck worked on the construction of the New Orphan School in Hobart. In May 1831, he was sent to Ross with an army of men to repair the bridge. Since it was made of timbers, there was no work for him. However, he worked for William Kermode who was busy building a house in the neighbourhood, the first 'Mona Vale.' Colbeck's earnings were to be banked by Kermode, whose son Robert Quale was going to arrange passage for Colbeck's wife and his son, as soon as he got to England.

In March 1833, Colbeck was recommended to superintend the construction of the Ross Bridge but it was not until May 1835 that Colbeck became the overseer. Although given detailed instructions from the government appointed architect, Charles Atkinson, Colbeck ignored them. Atkinson stated: 'Is it possible for an ignorant unlettered plodding scion of his class to understand the construction of the most difficult and scientific structures invented by man?'

Colbeck and Daniel Herbert received their emancipation on the completion of the bridge. Colbeck received a Free Pardon on 28 October 1841.

Colbeck appeared in the 1843 Tasmania census as living at Long Plains, West Tamar. The date or route of his return to England is unknown.

Colbeck remarried in June 1850 at Wakefield (District), Yorkshire, England and is recorded as residing in Dewsbury in the UK 1851 census. His death is registered on 17 February 1852 and he was buried in St. Matthews burial ground, Dewsbury.
