= Wellington Rural District =

Wellington Rural District may refer to two former districts in England:

- Wellington Rural District, Shropshire
- Wellington Rural District, Somerset
