= Pembroke Land District =

Pembroke
- Cadastral division
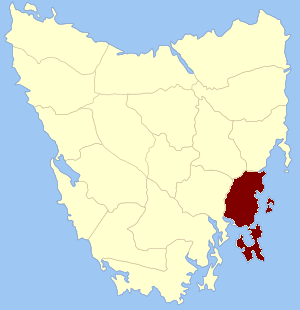
- Location in Tasmania
- Country: Australia
- State: Tasmania
Lands administrative divisions around Pembroke
Somerset	Glamorgan	Tasman Sea
Monmouth	Pembroke	Tasman Sea
Monmouth	Tasman Sea	Tasman Sea

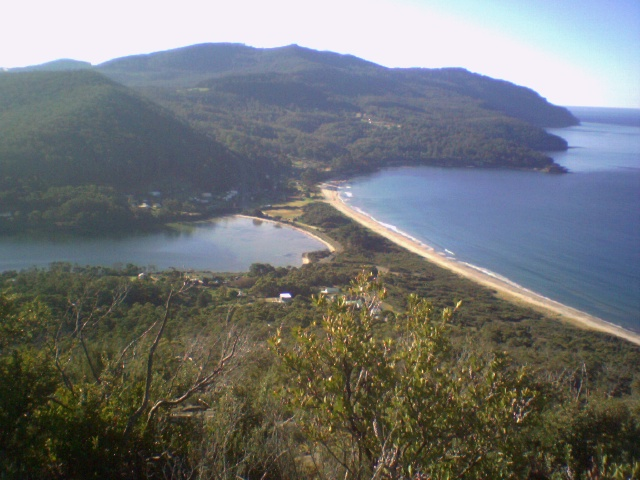
Land on both sides of Eaglehawk Neck between the Tasman Peninsula and Forestier Peninsula, is in Pembroke land district

Pembroke Land District is one of the twenty land districts of Tasmania which are part of the cadastral divisions of Tasmania. It was formerly one of the 18 counties of Tasmania. It includes Tasman Peninsula and Port Arthur, as well as Forestier Peninsula, Dodges Ferry and Maria Island. The Electoral division of Pembroke is not actually within the land district, but is close by in Monmouth.

== The original parishes ==
On 15 January 1836 George Arthur, the Lieutenant Governor of the Island of Van Diemen's Land proclaimed the first counties and parishes to be surveyed in the colony.

The County of Pembroke, bounded on the north by Little Swanport river; on the east by the Pacific Ocean; on the south by Storm Bay, and on the west by Storm Bay, Norfolk Bay, Pitt Water, and by the eastern boundaries of the parishes of Ulva, Staffa and Ormaig, and a line to the south east angle of the county of Somerset. This county to include White Rock, Maria Island, Lachlan Island, the Hippolyte Rocks, Tasman Island, Wedge Island, Sloping Island, Smooth Island, Green Island, the islands in Pitt Water, and all other islands adjacent to the coasts of the county.

Hundreds and parishes proclaimed at this time were:

- The hundred of Sorell
  - Canning parish
  - Forcett
  - Carlton
  - Sorell

The township of Sorell was proclaimed as being within the county.
