= Arthur Land District =

Coordinates: 43.12°S 146.25°E

Arthur
- Cadastral division
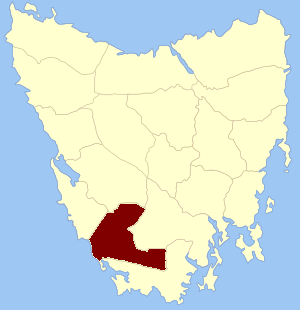
- Location in Tasmania
- Country: Australia
- State: Tasmania
Lands administrative divisions around Arthur
| Montgomery | Franklin | Buckingham |
| Montgomery | Arthur | Kent |
| Southern Ocean | Kent | Kent |

Arthur Land District is one of the twenty land districts of Tasmania which are part of the cadastral divisions of Tasmania. It was formerly one of the 18 counties of Tasmania. It is bordered by the Gordon River to the north-west, the Huon River to the north-east, and the Picton River to the east. It includes the Arthur Range.

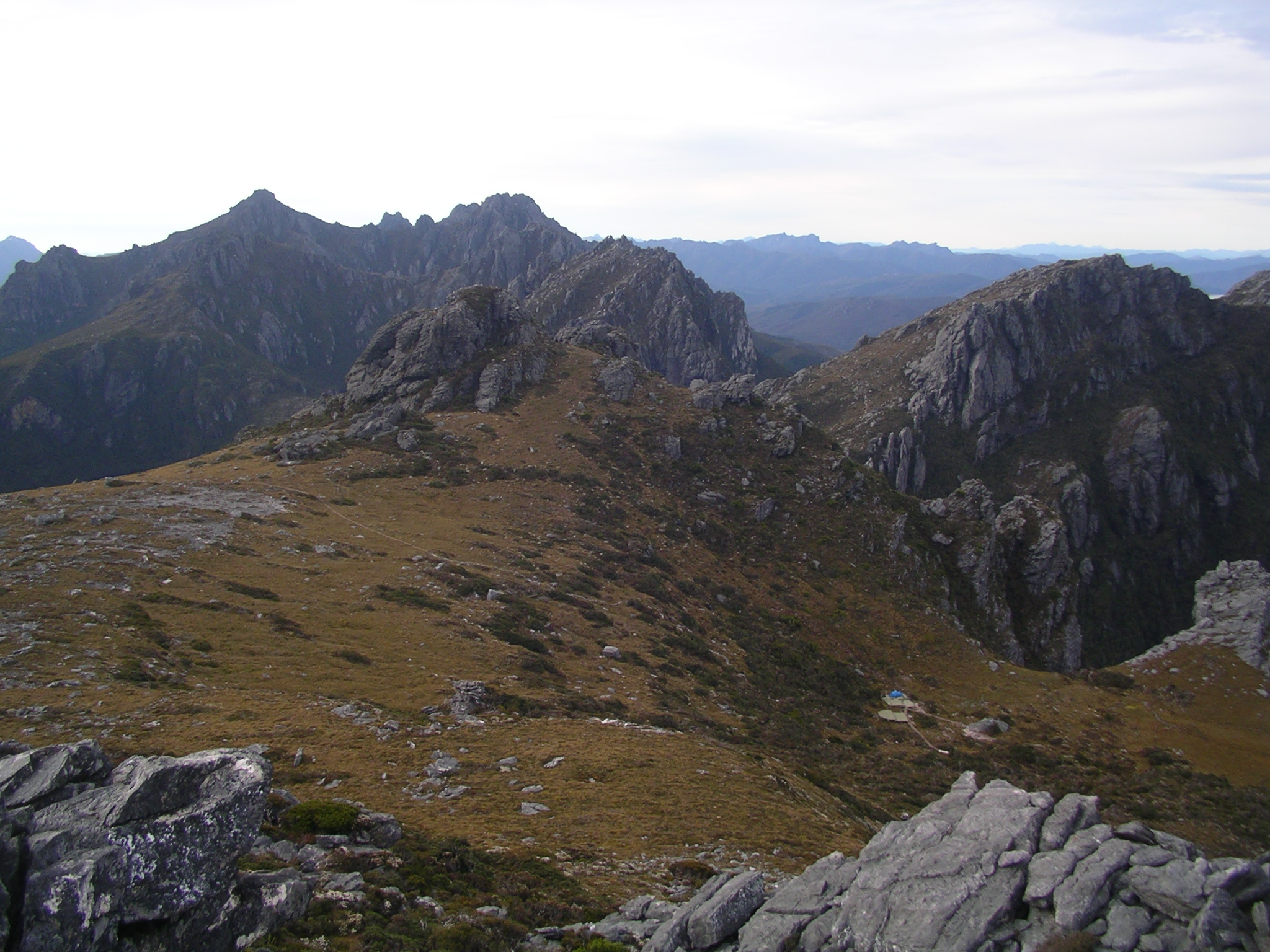
The Arthur Range, located in the district
