= Montagu Land District =

Montagu
- Cadastral division
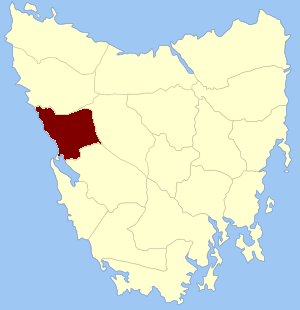
- Location in Tasmania
- Country: Australia
- State: Tasmania
Lands administrative divisions around Montagu
| Russell | Russell | Russell |
| Southern Ocean | Montagu | Lincoln |
| Southern Ocean | Montgomery | Franklin |

Montagu Land District (sometimes spelled Montague) is one of the twenty land districts of Tasmania which are part of the cadastral divisions of Tasmania. It was formerly one of the 18 counties of Tasmania. It is on the west coast of Tasmania bordered by Macquarie Harbour to the south and the Pieman River to the north. It includes parts of Queenstown, but only those parts to the west of the Queen River.
