= Macquarie River (Tasmania) =

River in Tasmania, Australia

Macquarie
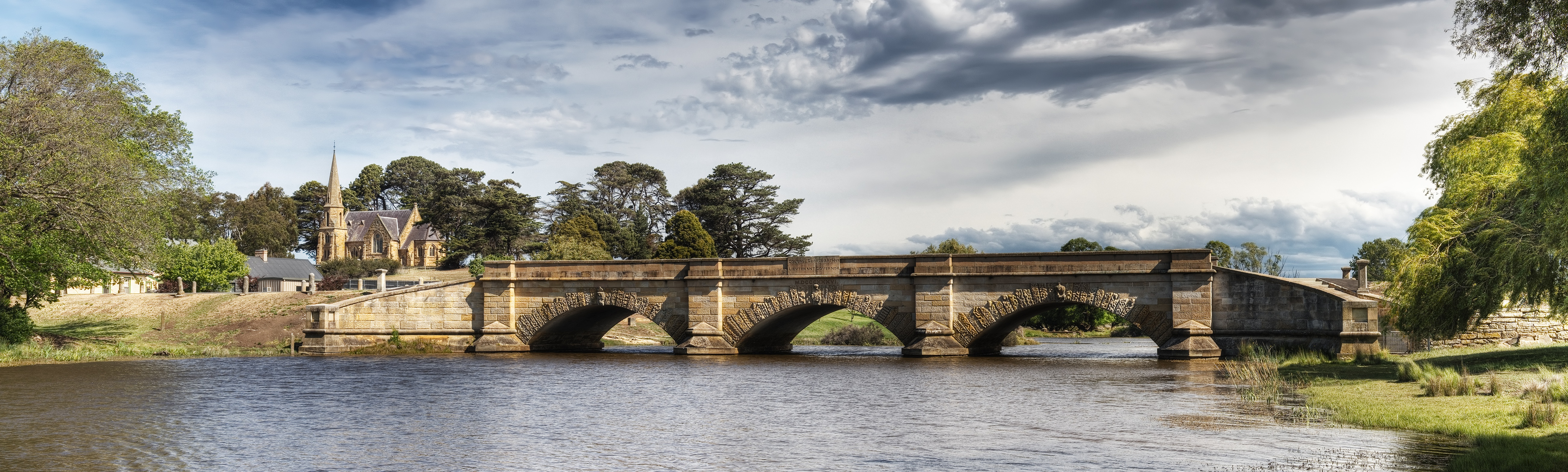

- Location of the Macquarie River mouth in Tasmania
- Etymology: Lachlan Macquarie

Location
- Country: Australia
- State: Tasmania
- Region: Midlands (Tasmania)
- Settlement: Ross

Physical characteristics
- Source: Tooms Lake
  - location: Hobgoblin
  - coordinates: 42°1′54″S 147°45′53″E
  - elevation: 606 m (1,988 ft)
- Mouth: South Esk River
  - location: Longford
  - coordinates: 41°35′14″S 147°7′31″E
  - elevation: 189 m (620 ft)
- Length: 189 km (117 mi)

Basin features
- River system: South Esk River
- Tributaries
  - left: Tooms River, Blackman River, Isis River, Lake River
  - right: Elizabeth River

The Macquarie River (Indigenous palawa kani: tinamarakunah (pron. teen.ner.mair.rer.koon.ner)) is a major perennial river in the Midlands region of Tasmania, Australia.

== Location and features ==
The Macquarie River rises below Tooms Lake, near Hobgoblin and flows generally south and then north-west and through the town of Ross before reaching its confluence with the South Esk River near Longford. The Tooms, Blackman, Elizabeth, Isis and Lake rivers all are tributaries of the Macquarie. The river descends 472 metres (1,549 ft) over its 189-kilometre (117 mi) course.

The traditional custodians of the Macquarie River Valley were the Tyerrernotepanner (chera-noti-pahner) Clan of the North Midlands Nation. The Tyerrernotepanner were a nomadic people who traversed country from the Central Plateau to the Eastern Tiers but were recorded as inhabiting "resorts" in the Macquarie Valley at Ross, Ellenthorpe Hall, Glen Morriston and Tooms Lake/moyentaliah.

== See also ==
- Rivers of Tasmania
