= Lands administrative divisions of Tasmania =

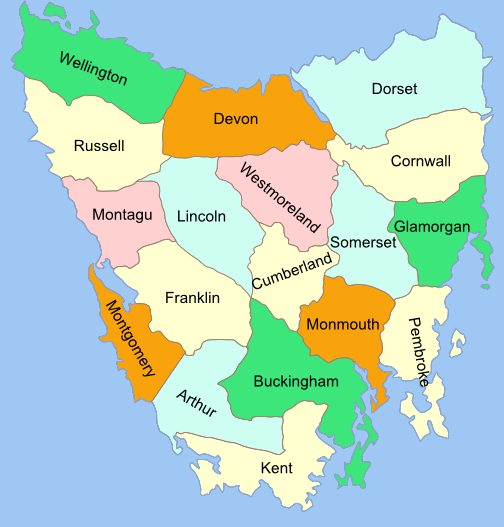
The 18 land districts (formerly counties) of the island of Tasmania

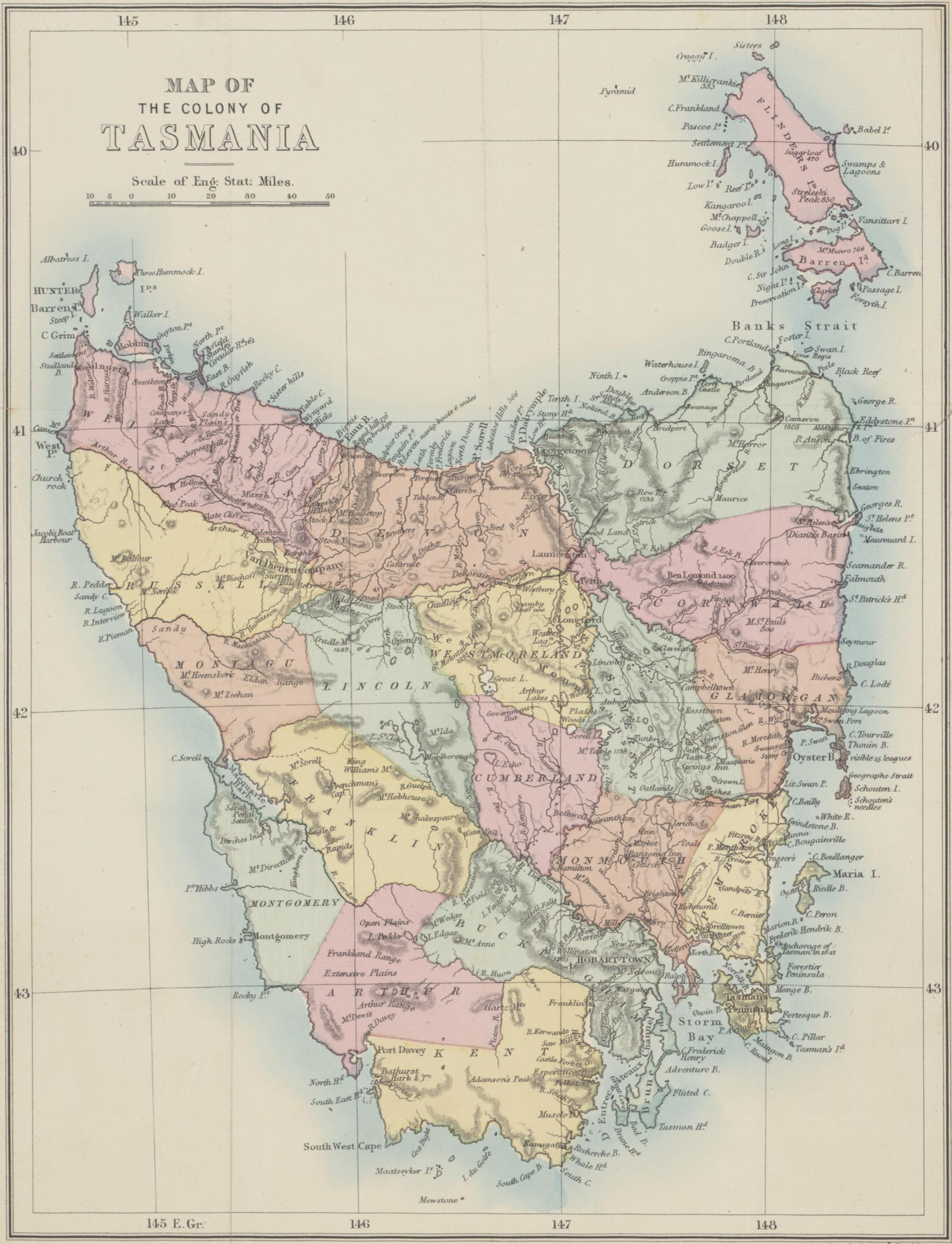
1873 map of Tasmania, showing the 18 counties

The lands administrative divisions of Tasmania are the divisions of Tasmania into land districts and parishes for cadastral purposes, which are part of the lands administrative divisions of Australia. There are 20 land districts in Tasmania, although in the early nineteenth century there were several other systems, with 18 or 36 counties and 9 other divisions used, as well as hundreds. The land districts include the 18 former counties of the island of Tasmania which were renamed but retain the same boundaries, plus King Island and Flinders Island. The counties are referenced in the 1911 Encyclopædia Britannica, with Hobart described as being in Buckingham County, Launceston in Cornwall County and Beaconsfield in Devon County. The land districts are used for land titles today, while the Local Government Areas of Tasmania with cities and municipalities are used for political and administrative purposes.

== Two counties ==
Tasmania was initially divided into two counties on 24 September 1804; Buckingham in the south, and Cornwall in the north. Cornwall was governed by William Paterson, with Buckingham governed by David Collins.

== 20 land districts ==
The 18 counties are shown in most maps of Tasmania in the mid to late nineteenth and earlier twentieth century. These counties are subdivided into parishes, and use the same names and boundaries that the land districts do, which are used for cadastral purposes today. The counties in the east and centre were proclaimed by 1850, while the western counties of Wellington, Russel, Montague, Lincoln, Franklin, Montgomery and Arthur were proclaimed during the 1850s.

- Arthur Land District
- Buckingham Land District
- Cornwall Land District
- Cumberland Land District
- Devon Land District
- Dorset Land District
- Flinders Land District
- Franklin Land District
- Glamorgan Land District
- Kent Land District
- King Land District
- Lincoln Land District
- Monmouth Land District
- Montagu Land District
- Montgomery Land District
- Pembroke Land District
- Russell Land District
- Somerset Land District
- Wellington Land District, Tasmania
- Westmoreland Land District

== Other divisions ==
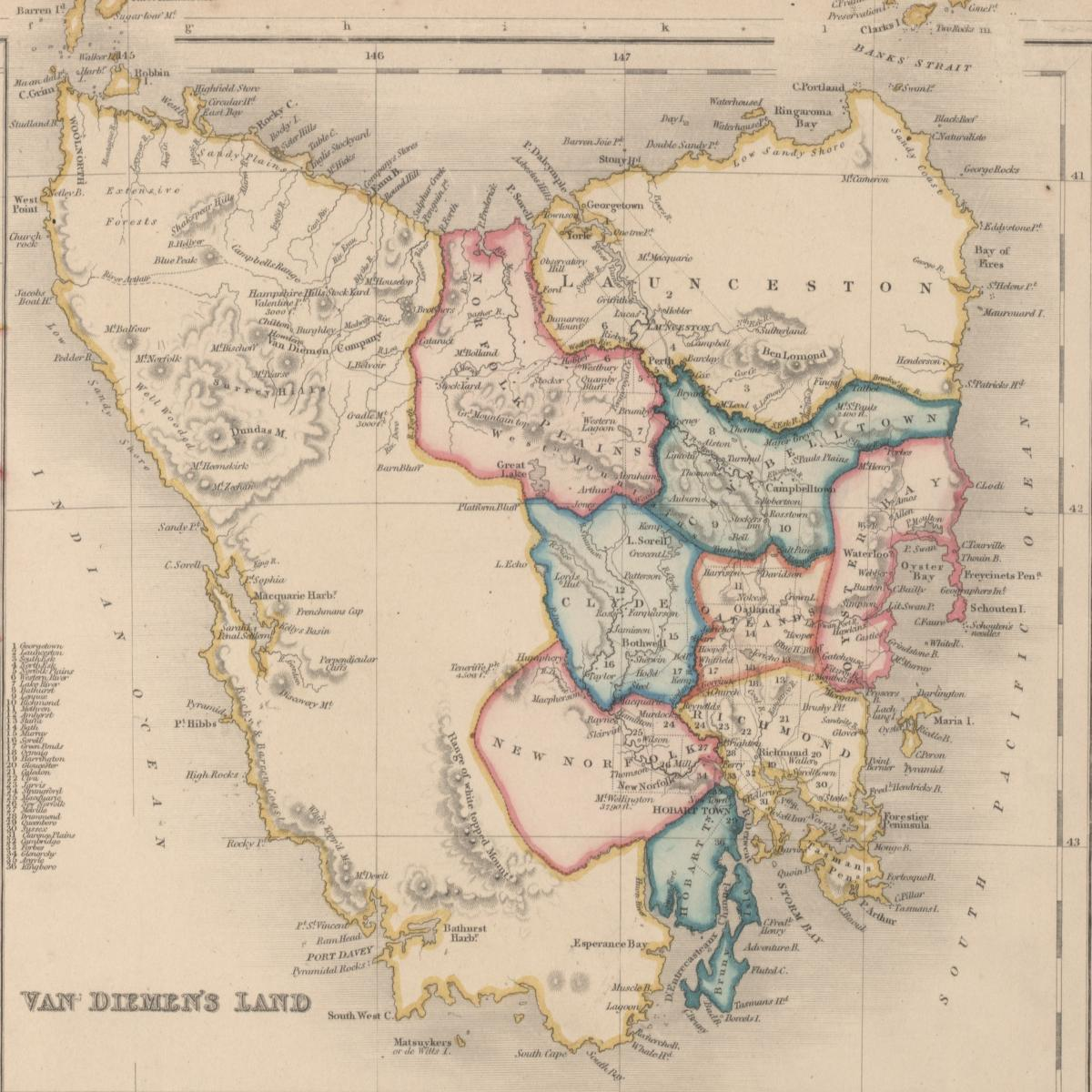
Map from 1852 showing nine divisions in the eastern part of the island

Some maps show the administrative divisions which, by 1852, had covered the eastern part of the island, such as this 1831 map and 1852 map. These were the forerunners of Local Government Areas and in 1852 were Launceston, Norfolk Plains, Campbelltown, Clyde, Oatlands, Oyster Bay, New Norfolk, Richmond and Hobart Town.

Tasmania also had hundreds in the early days of the colony under Governor Arthur, with each 100-square-mile (260 km^{2}) hundred being divided into four 25-square-mile (65 km^{2}) parishes. A formal list of counties, hundreds and parishes was gazetted on 1 July 1836.

== Early districts ==
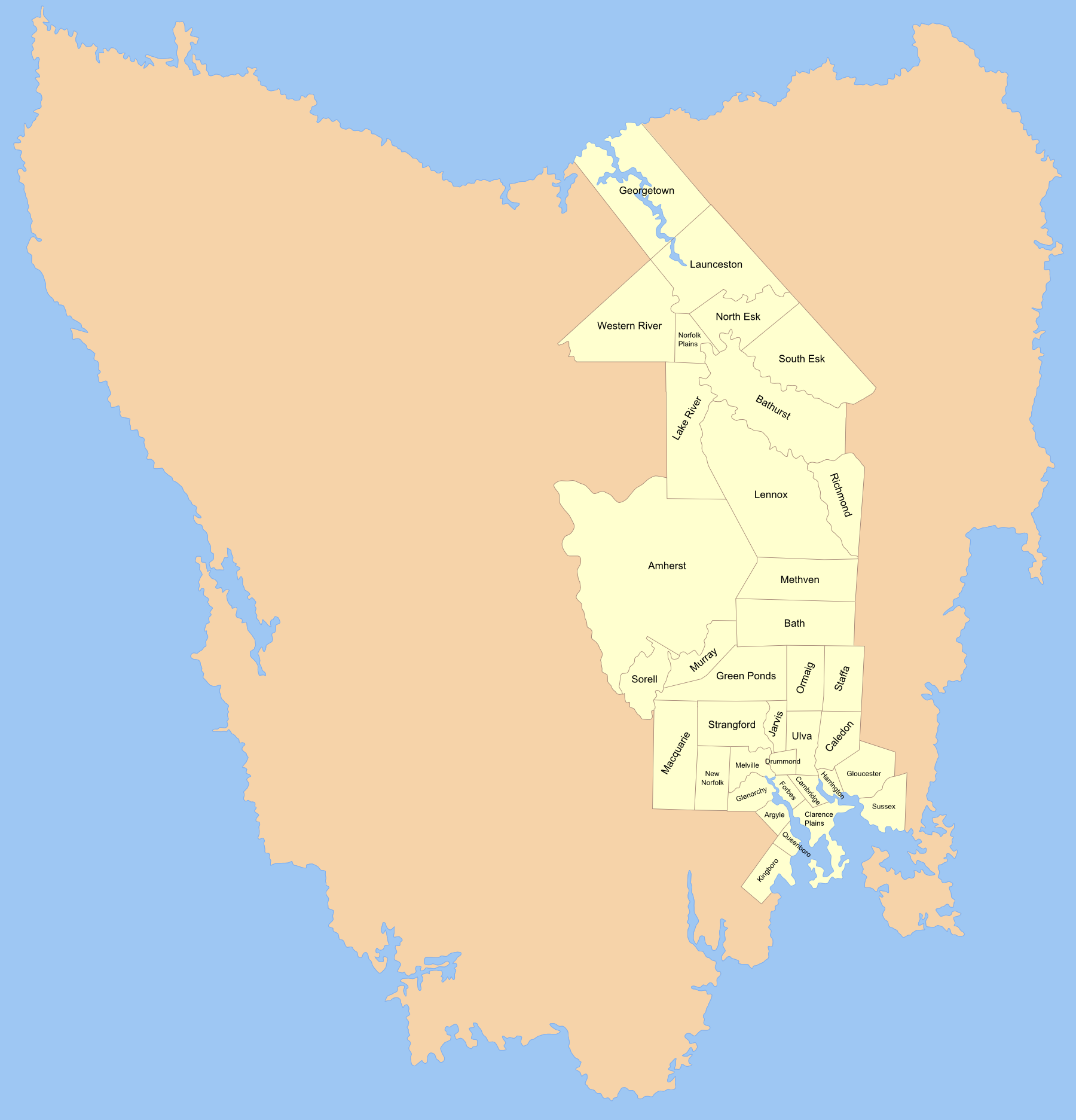
Map showing the names of 36 districts as used in 1855

Some early maps of Van Diemen's Land show 36 divisions, not covering the whole island. These were used since the 1820s. These were known as districts and preceded the survey of counties and parishes. The announcement in 1822 of a Muster (Census) mentions 32 districts or towns by name: Hobart Town, Argyle, Queenborough, Kingborough, Glenorchy, New Norfolk, Sorell, Clarence Plains, York, Cambridge, Ulva, Ormaig, Staffa, Caledon, Gloucester, Sussex, Harrington, Melville, Drummond, Strangford, Jarvis, Forbes, Green Ponds, Bath, Methven, Murray, Amherst, Lennox, Richmond, Norfolk Plains, Bathurst and Launceston.

This 1846 map shows the eleven counties thus far surveyed outlined, with parishes where existing. J. Archer's 1855 map shows a similar situation but with more bounded smaller subdivisions (including parishes) and the old unbounded district names superimposed, where appropriate. Subdivisions of counties include:

1. Georgetown
2. Launceston
3. South Esk
4. North Esk
5. Norfolk Plains
6. Western River
7. Lake River
8. Bathurst
9. Lennox
10. Richmond
11. Methven
12. Amherst
13. Staffa
14. Bath
15. Murray
16. Sorell
17. Green Ponds
18. Ormaig
19. Harrington
20. Gloucester
21. Caledon
22. Ulva
23. Jarvis
24. Strangford
25. Macquarie
26. New Norfolk
27. Melville
28. Drummond
29. Queenboro
30. Sussex
31. Clarence Plains
32. Cambridge
33. Forbes
34. Glenorchy
35. Argyle
36. Kingboro
