= Devon Land District =

Devon
- Cadastral division
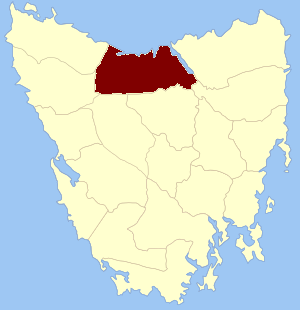
- Location in Tasmania
- Country: Australia
- State: Tasmania
Lands administrative divisions around Devon
Bass Strait	Bass Strait	Bass Strait
Wellington	Devon	Dorset
Russell	Lincoln	Westmoreland

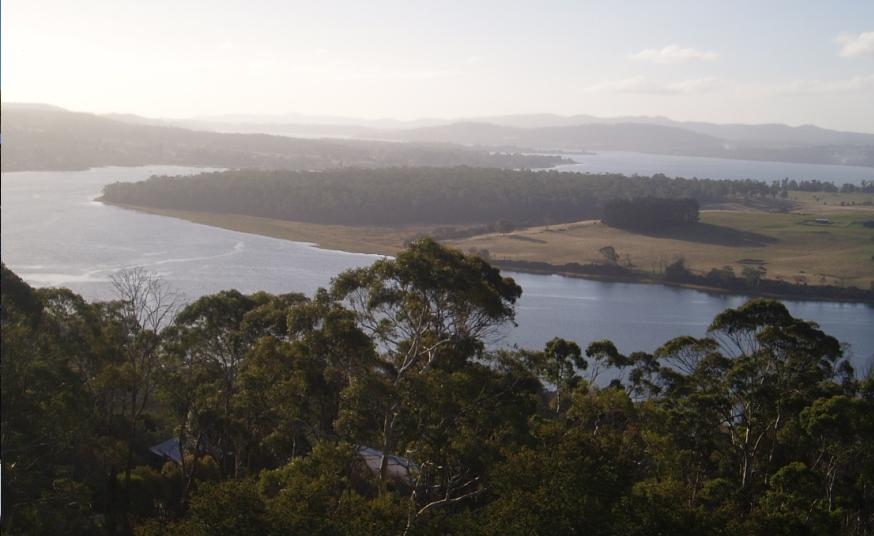
The Tamar River, the boundary between Devon and Dorset

Devon Land District is one of the twenty land districts of Tasmania which are part of the Cadastral divisions of Tasmania. It was formerly one of the 18 counties of Tasmania. The 1911 Encyclopædia Britannica describes Beaconsfield and Devonport as being in the county. It is bordered by the Tamar River in the east, and the Emu River near Burnie in the west. Deloraine is on the southern edge with the border with Westmoreland Land District. It is named after the English county of Devon.

== The original parishes ==
On 15 January 1836 George Arthur, the Lieutenant Governor of the Island of Van Diemen's Land proclaimed, via The Hobart Town Courier, the first counties and parishes to be surveyed in the colony.

The County of Devon, bounded on the east by the river Tamar, and by a portion of the river South Esk, on the south by the river Meander and by the Great road from Deloraine bridge to the Surry hills; on the west by the continuation of that road to Emu bay; and on the north by Bass's Straits. This county to include all islands in the river Tamar, and all islands situate between the mouth of the river Tamar and the mouth of the river Emu.
