= Wellington Land District, Tasmania =

Wellington
- Cadastral division
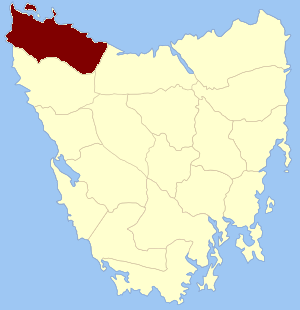
- Location in Tasmania
- Country: Australia
- State: Tasmania
Lands administrative divisions around Wellington
| Bass Strait | Bass Strait | Bass Strait |
| Southern Ocean | Wellington | Devon |
| Russell | Russell | Devon |

Wellington Land District is one of the twenty land districts of Tasmania which are part of the Cadastral divisions of Tasmania. It was formerly one of the 18 counties of Tasmania.
