= Lincoln Land District =

Lincoln
- Cadastral division
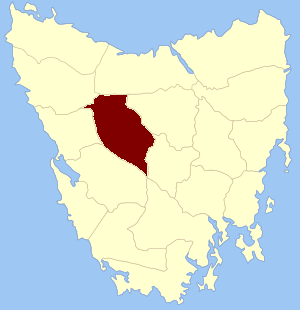
- Location in Tasmania
- Country: Australia
- State: Tasmania
Lands administrative divisions around Lincoln
Russell	Devon	Westmoreland
Montague	Lincoln	Westmoreland
Franklin	Franklin	Cumberland

Lincoln Land District is one of the twenty land districts of Tasmania which are part of the cadastral divisions of Tasmania. It was formerly one of the 18 counties of Tasmania. Its south-eastern tip is surrounded by the River Derwent on one side, and the Nive River on the other. It is bounded to the north by the Pieman River. It includes Cradle Mountain, the Overland Track, Lake St Clair and most of the Cradle Mountain-Lake St Clair National Park.

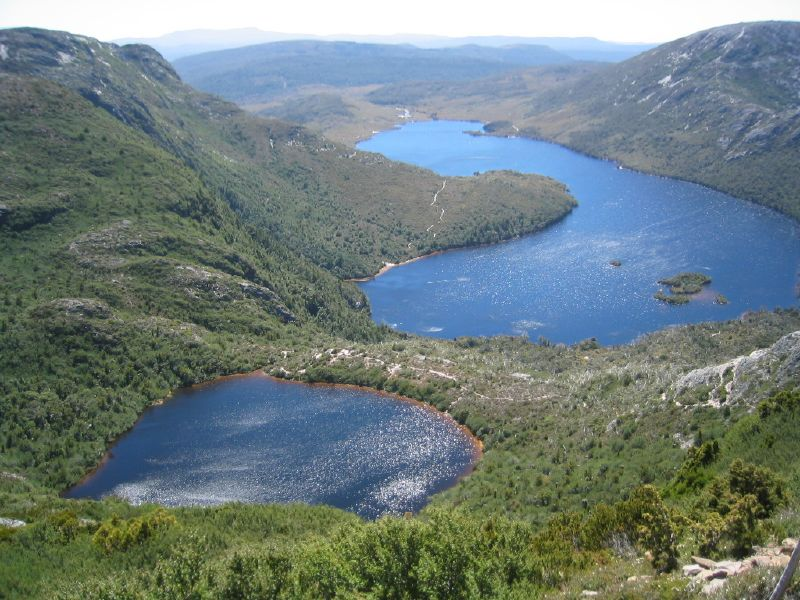
Most of the area is national park, such as Dove Lake, near Cradle Mountain.
