= The Courier (Hobart) =

Newspaper in Hobart, Tasmania

The Courier is a newspaper founded in 1827 in Hobart, Tasmania, as The Hobart Town Courier. It changed its name to The Hobart Town Courier and Van Diemen's Land Advertiser in 1839, settling on The Courier in 1840.

By 1830 the newspaper was printing 750 copies per issue.

In 1859 it merged with The Hobart Town Daily Mercury. The Mercury is a daily newspaper, published in Hobart, Tasmania, Australia, by Davies Brothers Pty Ltd, part of News Corp Australia and News Corp. The weekend issues of the paper are called Mercury on Saturday and Sunday Tasmanian.

- Title- The Hobart Town Mercury [electronic resource].
- Publisher- John Davies, 1857.
- Description- Digitised as part of the Australian Newspapers service which allows access to historic Australian newspapers.

Also available on microfilm. Electronic reproduction. Canberra, A.C.T., : National Library of Australia, 2008–2009 (Australian newspapers). Vol. 4, no. 379 (2 Feb. 1857)-v. 6, no. 640 (28 Dec. 1857). Mode of access: World Wide Web. Continues: Hobarton Mercury; with issue for 24 Aug. 1857, absorbed: Colonial Times.

- Life dates- Vol. 4, no. 379 (2 Feb. 1857)-v. 6, no. 640 (28 Dec. 1857).3 v.
- Later title- Hobart Town Daily Mercury 1835-6729
- Former title- Hobarton Mercury 1835-6710, Colonial Times (Hobart, Tasmania) 1835-4734
- Place-Australia Tasmania Hobart.
