= Darwin, Tasmania =

Former town in Tasmania, Australia

Coordinates: 42°14′S 145°36′E

- See also the Australian federal electoral Division of Darwin (1903–1955) for the electoral division now known as Division of Braddon

Darwin was a surveyed and short-lived community at the eastern side of Mount Darwin on the West Coast Range.

It was the location of a stopping place on the North Mount Lyell Railway which ran between Pillinger and Gormanston.

Its post office opened on 21 February 1900 and closed in 1903.

It was the location of the first discoveries of Darwin Glass during the construction of the railway, and the subsequent work to locate and identify the Darwin Crater some 60 years later.

== Related railway stopping places ==
- Gormanston railway station (existed on branch from Linda 1900–1903 only)
- Linda (also known as North Lyell)
- Crotty (previous name King River until 1902)
- Crotty Smelters (siding)
- Darwin
- Ten Mile
- Pillinger (Kelly Basin)
