= North Mount Lyell =

Mine in Western Tasmania, Australia

North Mount Lyell was the name of a mine, mining company, locality (sometimes as North Lyell) and former railway north of Gormanston on the southern slopes of Mount Lyell in the West Coast Range on the West Coast of Tasmania, and on to the ridge between Mount Lyell and Mount Owen.

== North Mount Lyell Copper Company ==
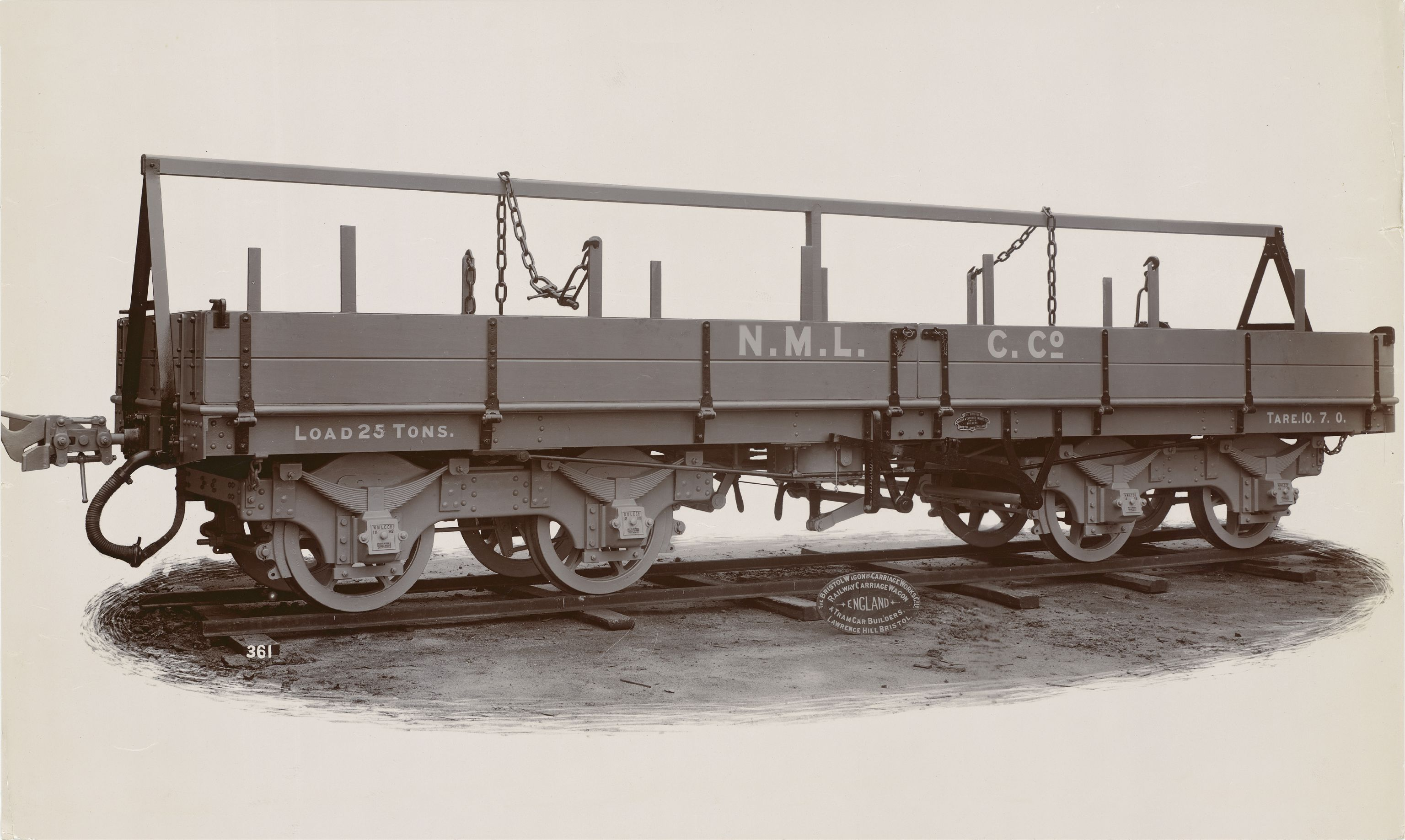
Wagon built by Bristol Wagon & Carriage Works in 1898

The company was short-lived, however the mine, orebody and workings lasted long after the company was absorbed into the workings of the Mount Lyell Mining and Railway Company following the failure of the smelters at Crotty.

The stages of building the infrastructure of the mines, the smelters, and port at Kelly Basin were photographed by John Watt Beattie.

== Founder ==
The company was founded by James Crotty, and was for a few years a fierce competitor with Mount Lyell. Geoffrey Blainey gives a description of the rivalry and final amalgamation in The Peaks of Lyell. As Blainey points out, the North Mount Lyell workings eventually proved vital for the Mount Lyell Company.

== Establishments ==
During Crotty's establishment of the company and its operations the company had:

- The North Mount Lyell mine on its lease adjacent and east of the Mount Lyell Mining and Railway Company leases
- Shipping
- Port and railway terminus at Kelly Basin and Pillinger, Tasmania
- Smelter and town at Crotty, Tasmania at the eastern foot of Mount Jukes and just south of the King River, Tasmania
- Railway terminus at Linda, Tasmania
- Aerial ropeway between North Lyell mine and Linda
- North Mount Lyell Railway

== 1912 disaster ==
The 1912 North Mount Lyell Disaster is also found in Blainey's work, but for decades later there were divergent and popular accounts from the official reports that followed.

== Locality ==
The North Lyell locality (at which some of the workers killed in the disaster had addresses) was eventually overtaken by the Mount Lyell mine workings. A rare photo of the locality is in Blainey's book.

== 20th century output ==
The development of the Mount Lyell mine depended upon the resources of the North Lyell orebody and workings well into the late twentieth century.

== See also ==
- Railways on the West Coast of Tasmania
- West Coast Tasmania Mines
