= Bird River (Tasmania) =

River in Western Tasmania, Australia

Coordinates: 42°21′33″S 145°33′12″E

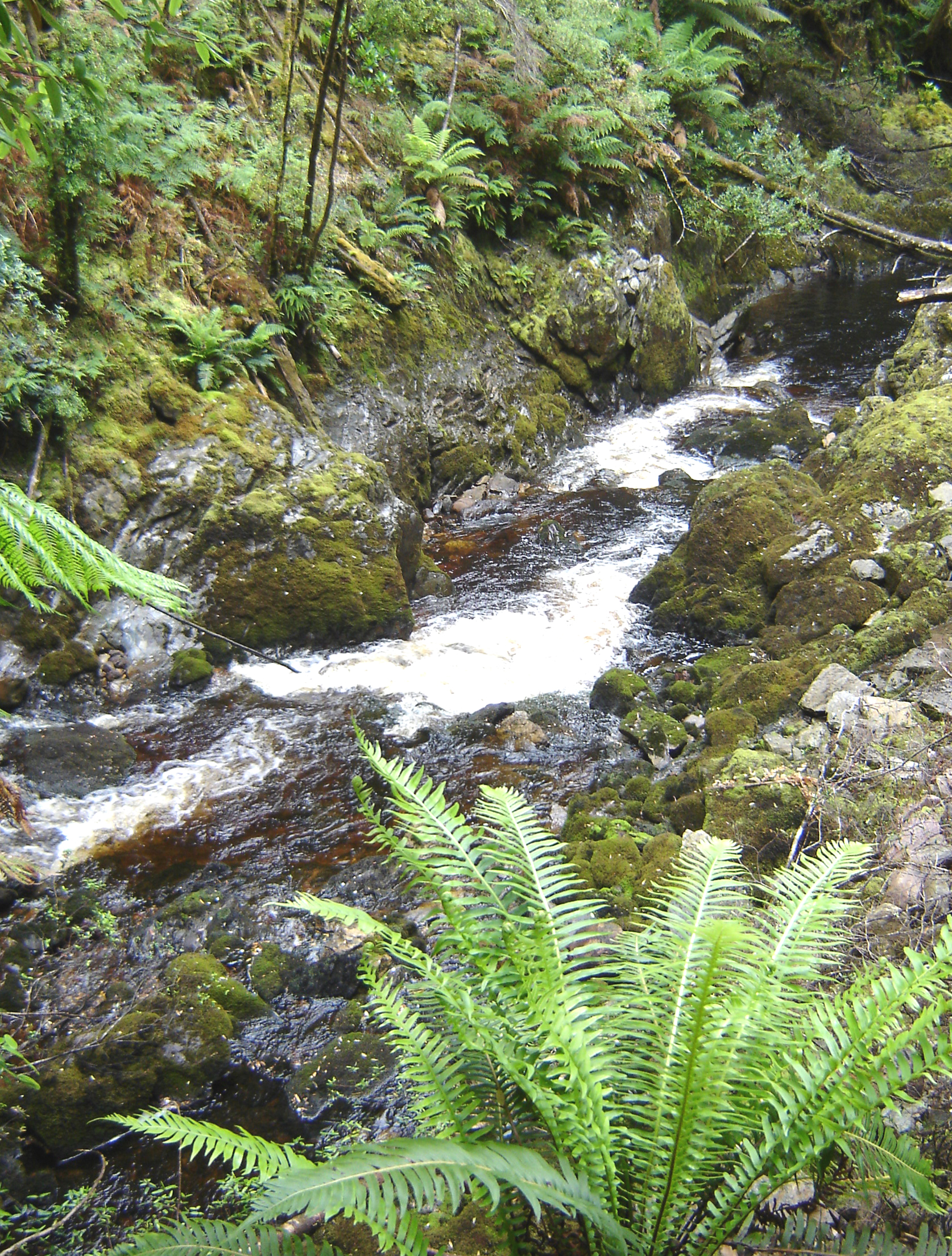
Bird River

Bird River is a short river in western Tasmania in Australia. It drains the area of South Darwin Peak, at the southern end of the West Coast Range, into Macquarie Harbour.

The North Mount Lyell Railway had to cross the river before reaching Pillinger and the harbour in Kelly Basin.

The area around the river and Kelly Basin area is not in the South West World Heritage area, but is on the edge, and has various conservation processes due to the history and ecology of the area.
