= Linda, Tasmania =

Former town in Tasmania, Australia

Linda
- Town
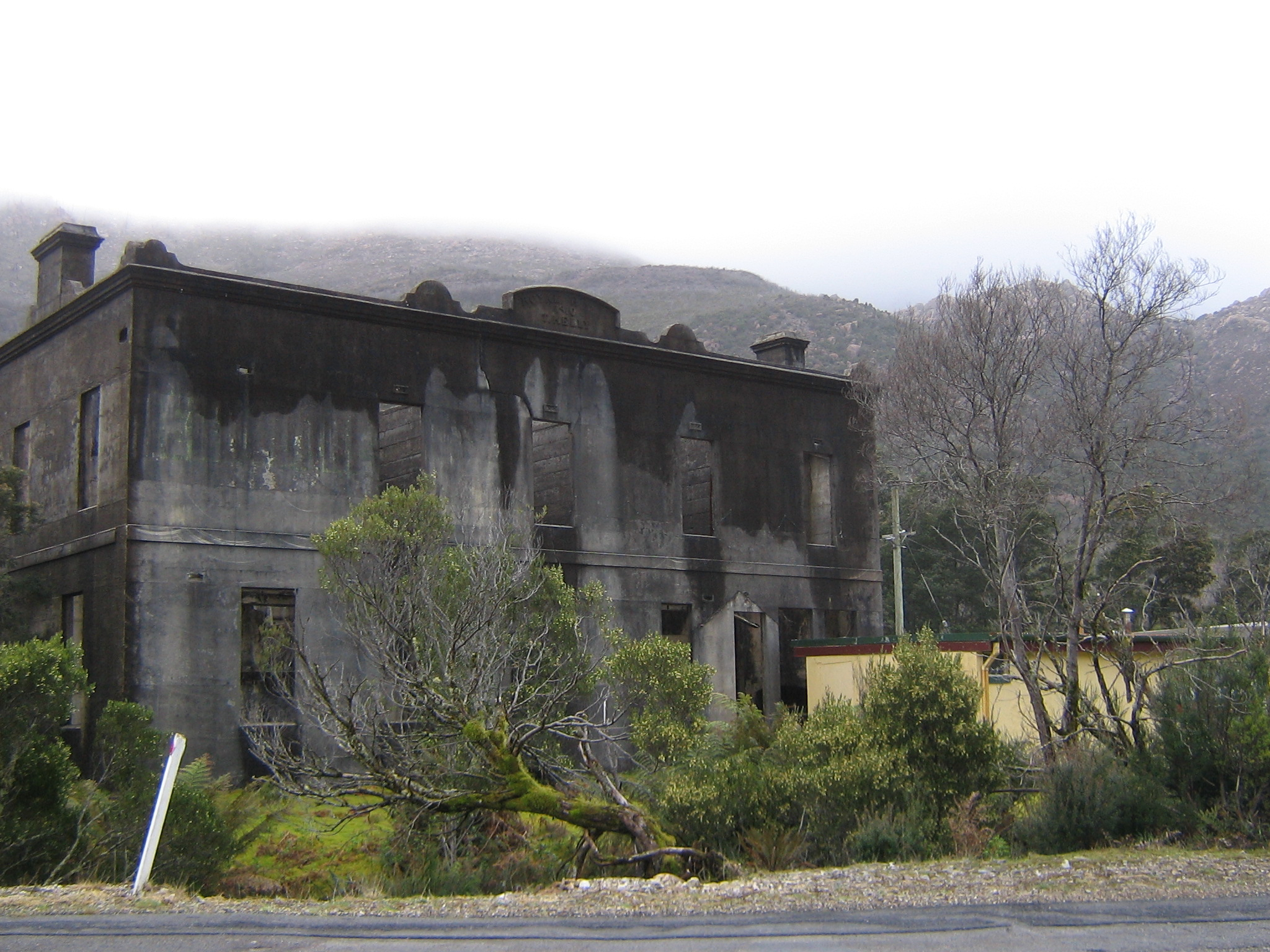
- The shell of the Royal Hotel at Linda in the early 2000s

- Coordinates: 42°03′50″S 145°36′10″E
- Country: Australia
- State: Tasmania

Linda is the site of an old ghost town in the Linda Valley in the West Coast Range of Tasmania, Australia. It has also been known as Linda Valley.

== North Mount Lyell ==
There had been a location or community high on the ridge between Mount Owen and Mount Lyell above the Linda Valley to the west known as North Mount Lyell and in Blainey's The Peaks of Lyell, the photograph has the caption "The site of North Lyell town, blasted away to form the modern open cut".

When North Mount Lyell was taken over by Mount Lyell Mining and Railway Company in 1903, Linda was quickly reduced in significance. Eventually most residents moved to either Gormanston, or Queenstown other nearby Mount Lyell towns.

== Facilities ==
Linda Post Office opened on 18 December 1899 and closed in 1966. The Royal Hotel was built during 1901, was destroyed by fire in 1910 and rebuilt. The property was left derelict after 1952 and re-sold in 2020.

== Linda railway station ==
Linda railway station was the terminus of the Linda aerial ropeway and the North Mount Lyell Railway when it was in operation.

Copper ore was taken from the mine to smelters at Crotty (now under the waters of Lake Burbury) then the refined metal taken to a port at Pillinger on the shores of Macquarie Harbour at Kelly Basin.

The remains of the town are now adjacent to the Lyell Highway east of Queenstown.

== Recovery ==
In the 2020s recovery of the location was in motion with activity at the hotel site which was brought in 2021 and has been developed as Linda Cafe .

== See also ==
- West Coast Tasmania Mines
