= Linda Valley =

Valley in West Coast Range, Tasmania, Australia

Linda Valley is a valley in the West Coast Range of Tasmania. It was earlier known as the Vale of Chamouni. It is located between Mount Owen and Mount Lyell.

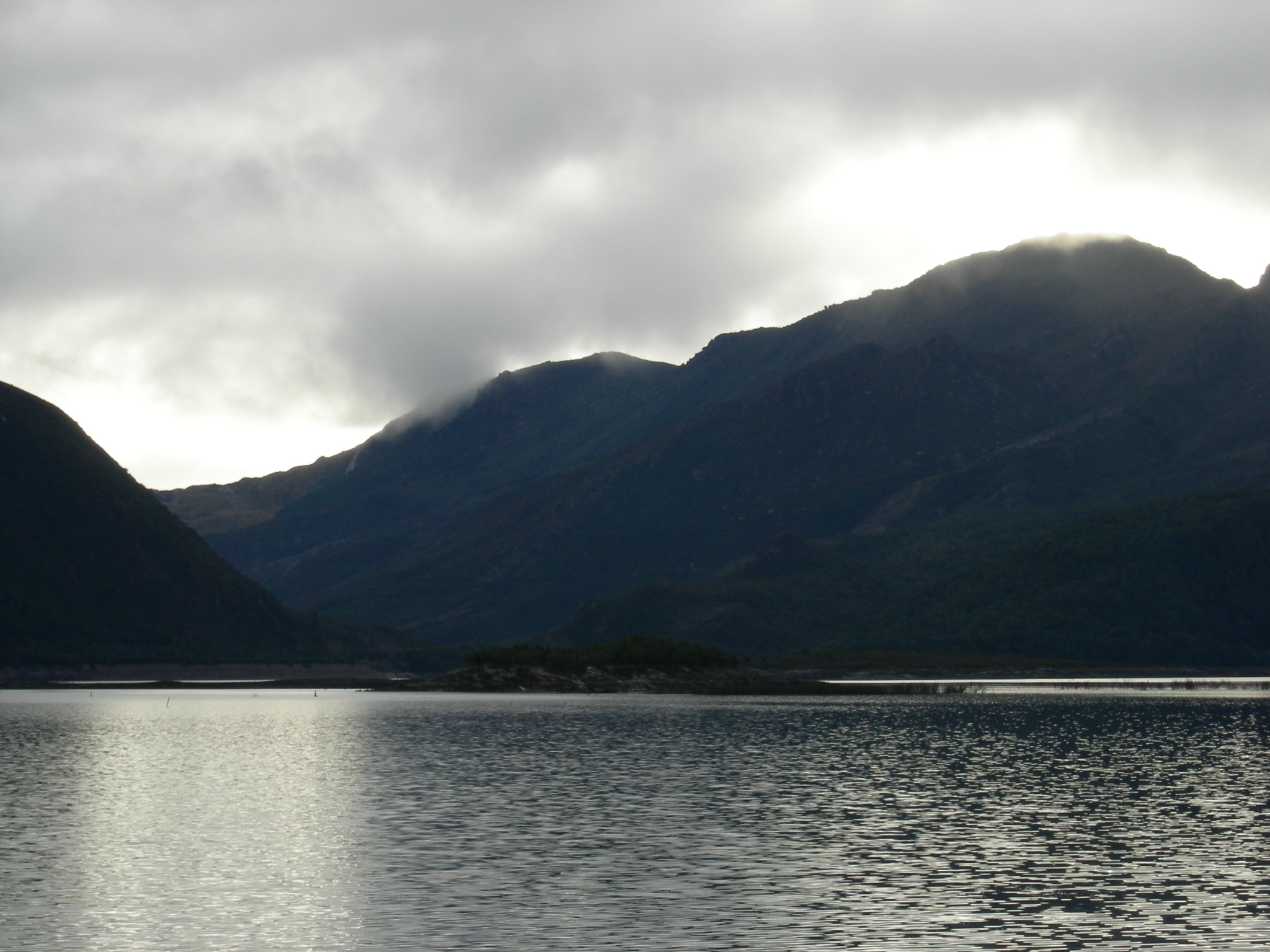
Eastern end of Linda Valley next to lake Burbury

== Human settlement ==
Linda Valley is the location of two historical settlements, Linda and Gormanston. These settlements were close to the Mount Lyell mines and workings, at the western edge of Lake Burbury, and east of the old Mount Lyell Mining and Railway Company operations.

The terminus of the North Mount Lyell Railway was at Gormanston for a short time, the main point of operations for the railway was the yard and railway station at Linda, known as the Linda Valley station in early records.

A feature in the landscape is the formation created for the Comstock Tram that was proposed to circumnavigate Mount Lyell but was never completed; it started at Linda. The formation created can still be seen in parts around the sides of Mount Lyell.

== Fires ==
The valley suffered from extensive bush fires in the early twentieth century, and as a consequence the forested valley became denuded. Large numbers of tree stumps line the Mount Lyell slopes in the valley a hundred years after the fires.

== Glaciation ==
The valley is the site of extensive evidence of glaciation in the West Coast Range with a particular stage known as the Linda Glacial stage. The valley is also known as part of the landscape affected by the King River Glacier, which also left moraine at Crotty and Henty River.

The valley's glacial moraine is the only Late Pliocene site with plant fossil assemblages in Tasmania and one of only a few in Australia.

The valley has been part of recent mineral exploration lease areas - however prospective mineral deposits have not been located to date, possibly due to the glacial moraine.

== See also ==
- Geology of Tasmania

== Sources ==
- Blainey, Geoffrey (2000). The Peaks of Lyell (6th ed.). Hobart: St. David's Park Publishing. ISBN 0-7246-2265-9.
- Whitham, Charles. Western Tasmania: A Land of Riches and Beauty.
