= Pimelea milliganii =

Scientific classification
- Kingdom: Plantae
- Clade: Tracheophytes
- Clade: Angiosperms
- Clade: Eudicots
- Clade: Rosids
- Order: Malvales
- Family: Thymelaeaceae
- Genus: Pimelea
- Species: P. milliganii

Binomial name
- Pimelea milliganii Meisn.

Synonyms
- Banksia milliganii (Meisn.) Kuntze; Pimelea milligani Meisn. orth. var.

Species of shrub

Pimelea milliganii, commonly known as silver riceflower or Milligan's rice flower, is a species of flowering plant in the family Thymelaeaceae and is endemic to a restricted part of Tasmania. It is a low, much-branched, densely hairy shrub with more or less elliptic leaves and compact clusters of white to pinkish flowers usually surrounded by two leaf-like involucral bracts.

== Description ==
Pimelea milliganii is a low, much-branched, densely hairy shrub or undershrub that typically grows to a height of up to 70 cm (28 in) and has densely hairy young stems. The leaves are silvery and more or less elliptic, 4–11 mm (0.16–0.43 in) long and 1.5–5 mm (0.059–0.197 in) wide on a short petiole. The flowers are white to pinkish, 3–5 mm (0.12–0.20 in) long, and arranged in compact clusters of 7 to 15 on hairy pedicels, usually surrounded by 2 leaf-like involucral bracts. The floral tube is 5–6 mm (0.20–0.24 in) long, the sepals 2.0–2.5 mm (0.079–0.098 in) long. Flowering has been observed between December and March.

== Taxonomy ==
Pimelea milliganii was first formally described in 1857 by Carl Meissner in 1845 in de Candolle's Prodromus Systematis Naturalis Regni Vegetabilis from specimens collected by Joseph Milligan near Macquarie Harbour.

== Distribution ==
This pimelea is restricted to the Queenstown area of western Tasmania where it grows in alpine heath on mountain summits at altitudes of between 900 and 1,250 m (2,950 and 4,100 ft).

== Conservation status ==
Pimelea milliganii is listed as "rare" under the Tasmanian Government Threatened Species Protection Act 1995.
