= Kelly Basin Road =

Road in Western Tasmania

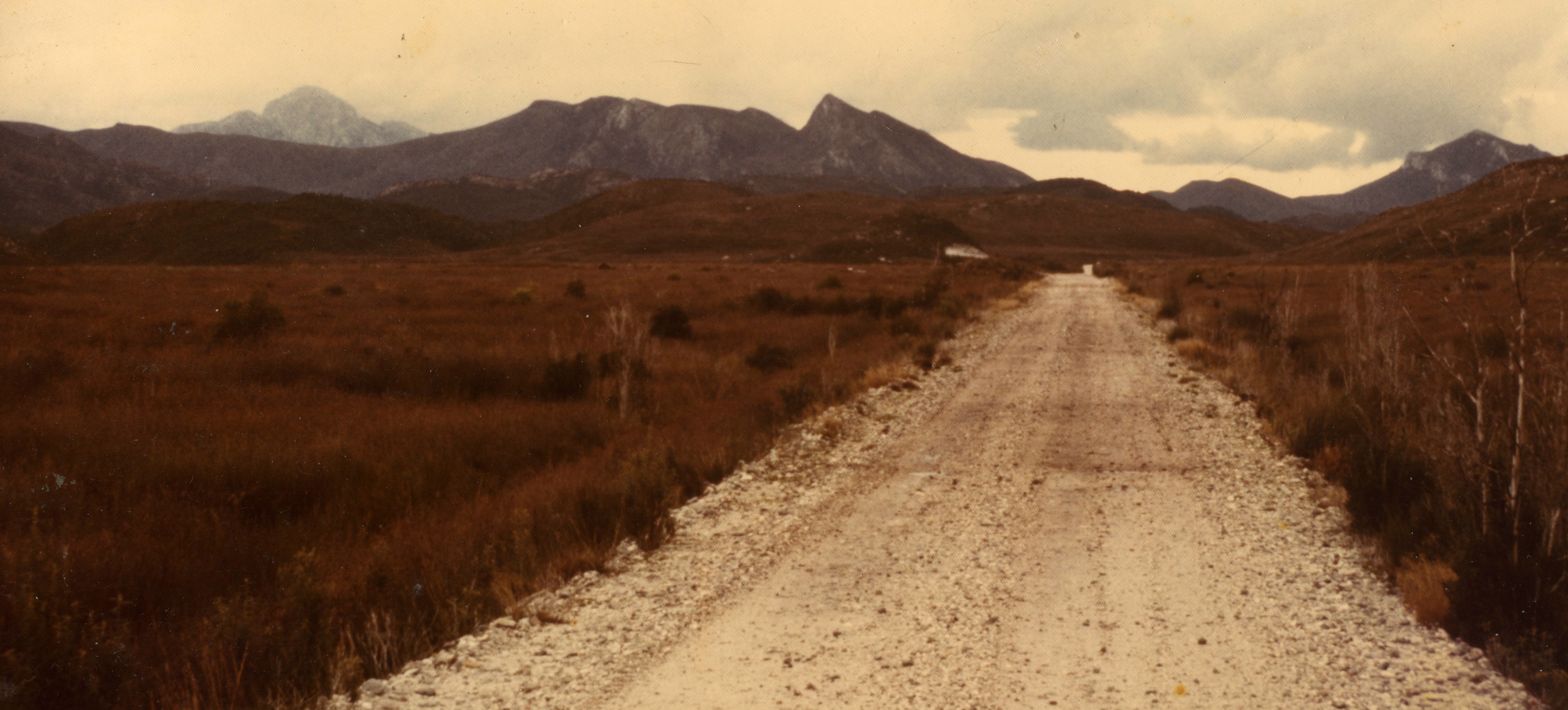
Kelly Basin Road in the 1970s

Kelly Basin Road was a road built on the formation of the former North Mount Lyell railway line in the King River Valley of Western Tasmania. It ran to the east of the West Coast Range, from the Linda Valley, to Kelly Basin.

Following the cessation of rail services on the North Mount Lyell railway line, and removal of the track, the road's provision of access into otherwise difficult areas created anticipation of a number of uses for forestry and mining activity.

It was an important location for both protestors and police during the No Dams blockade in the 1980s.

Most of the formation now lies under the Lake Burbury impoundment, a result of the Hydro Tasmania King River power development scheme.

Portions of the road still exist south of the Darwin Dam, and the Bird River Bridge to Kelly Basin area is now a protected and adventure tourist location.
