= Mount Owen (Tasmania) =

Mountain in Tasmania, Australia

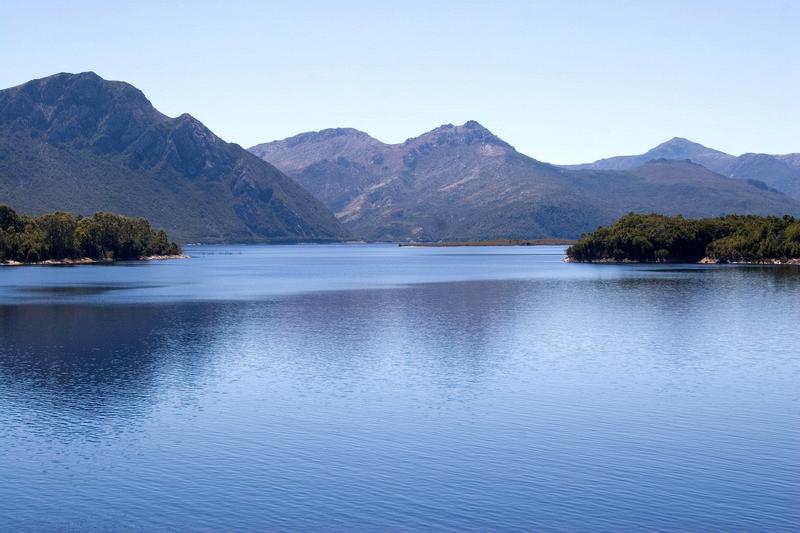
- East Mount Owen wall and Lake Burbury from Bradhsaws Bridge

Highest point
- Elevation: 1,146 m (3,760 ft)
- Prominence: 774 m (2,539 ft)
- Isolation: 8.53 km (5.30 mi)
- Coordinates: 42°05′24″S 145°36′00″E

Geography
- Location within Tasmania
- Location: West Coast, Tasmania, Australia
- Parent range: West Coast Range

Climbing
- Easiest route: from North West along track to TV tower

Mount Owen is a mountain directly east of the town of Queenstown on the West Coast Range in Western Tasmania, Australia.

With an elevation of 1,146 metres (3,760 ft) above sea level, like most of the mountains in the West Coast Range, it was named by the geologist Charles Gould after Richard Owen. The taller mountains were named after opponents or critics of Charles Darwin, the smaller after his supporters. The north western slopes are clearly seen from Gormanston and the Linda Valley 'Long Spur'.

== Features and access ==
Historically, the tree line on Mount Owen was to a high level. However, timber on the slopes was used by the local mining operations. In the early days of settlement, fires started on the slopes destroyed housing in Queenstown and threatened the North Mount Lyell Railway.

By the early twentieth century, the slopes of Mount Owen were denuded and had limited remnant vegetation.

A map in Geoffrey Blainey's The Peaks of Lyell, sourced from 1900–1910, calls the north west peak the 'North Spur'. The northern slopes, clearly visible from the Lyell Highway passing through the Linda Valley, show the extent of degradation due to fire, smelter fumes and heavy rainfall. It has small glacial lakes on its upper eastern slope, indicating the extent of glaciation in the King River valley. The western slopes loom over Queenstown and in winter are regularly covered in snow. The eastern wall to its north eastern peak hangs over the western shore of Lake Burbury and, in earlier times, the North Mount Lyell Railway which passed beneath.

In the late 1890s a number of mining ventures that utilized proximity to mining leases with the name Mount Lyell as an attractor of investment, tried to elicit interest in leases on the lower slope of Mount Owen.

== Current conditions ==
There are TV and communications towers on its north west peak (North Spur), which has been used a vehicle access track. Other geological features near Mount Owen include Mount Lyell to the north and Mount Huxley to the south.

Mount Owen is accessible on foot along a formed four wheel track. As early as 1938 suggestions were made to create a formed track for tourists and visitors.

The surface is gravel and rocks. It is a moderate-to-hard walk and takes about 4 hours including the return trip. The walk starts at Karlson's Gap, the saddle between Gormanston and Mt Owen.

== See also ==
- List of highest mountains of Tasmania
