= Mount Lyell Remediation and Research and Demonstration Program =

Mine pollution remediation in Western Tasmania

The Mount Lyell Remediation and Research and Demonstration Program was a joint rehabilitation programme between the Supervising Scientist Australia and the Department of Environment and Land Management, Tasmania to clean up the King River, Queen River and Macquarie Harbour.

This was following over 100 years of mine waste and town waste from Queenstown being emptied into the rivers.

It was conducted after the closing of the Mount Lyell Mining and Railway Company in 1994, and most reports were produced by 1996. At the time of the final report it was claimed that the program was one of Australia's most comprehensive response to large scale environmental damage.

The review of the effluent and environment of the Mount Lyell mining lease resulted in reports that were published, and the new owner of the Mount Lyell lease - Copper Mines of Tasmania (first company) - complying with requirements of the findings and the creation of tailings dams and the conclusion of any effluent disposal into the Queen River and King River.

Even after the remediation programme, doubts exist regarding the issues addressed.

The delta at the mouth of Macquarie Harbour that has an extended size of sediment has been of concern, before and since the programme.

== Publications ==
- Koehnken, Lois (1997) Final Report Mount Lyell Remediation Research and Demonstration Program. Supervising Scientist Report 126, Supervising Scientist, Canberra. ISBN 0-642-24326-3
