= List of mines of the West Coast, Tasmania =

Mines in Tasmania, Australia

The mines of the West Coast of Tasmania have a rich historical heritage as well as an important mineralogical value in containing or having had found, specimens of rare and unusual minerals. Also, the various mining fields have important roles in the understanding of the mineralization of the Mount Read Volcanics, and the occurrence of economic minerals.

== List of named mines ==
The list below is a partial collation of the names of mines that have existed, a considerable number are found on or adjacent to the West Coast Range. Other mines and leases with different names may have existed.

Notes

- The place names after the name of the mine are as found in records, and may not be accurate.
- Where possible, subheadings are created for entries such as Mount Lyell, where different workings at the mine were named, and some common usages do not necessarily relate to company or Mines Department records
- It is not a list of exploration leases, or "finds" where a mineral has been found on the west coast.

* Adelaide Proprietary Mine, Dundas
- Austral Mine, Zeehan
- Boulder Mine, North Dundas
- Britannia Mine, Zeehan
- British-Zeehan Mine, Zeehan
- Central Balstrup Mine, Zeehan
- Colebrook Mine, Rosebery
- Comet Mine, Dundas
- Comstock Mine, Zeehan
- Cumberland Tin Mine, Mount Heemskirk
- Curtin Davis Mine, Dundas
- Dundas Extended, Dundas
- East Hercules Mine, Rosebery
- Farrell Mine, Tullah (also as North Farrell)
- Federation Mine, Mount Heemskirk
- Fraser Creek Mine, North East Dundas
- Grubbs Mine, Zeehan
- Hal Jukes, Mount Jukes
- Hecla Curtin Mine, Dundas
- Henty Gold Mine, Henty River
- Hercules Mine, Mount Read
- Hydes, Mount Jukes (West)
- Jukes Proprietary, Mount Jukes
- Junction Mine, Zeehan
- King Jukes Mine, Crotty
- Lake Jukes, Crotty
- Magnet Mine, Waratah
- Maynes Mine, Mount Heemskirk
- Melba Mine, North Dundas
- Montana Mine, Zeehan
- Montana Western Extended Mine
- Mount Black Mine, Rosbery
- Mount Bischoff tin mine, Mount Bischoff
- Mount Darwin, Mount Darwin,
- Mount Farrell Mine, Tullah
- Mount Lindsay Mine, Parsons Hood
- Mount Lyell Mining & Railway Company operations at Mount Lyell, Queenstown
  - Cape Horn
  - Comstock (also known as Lyell Comstock, in close proximity to Cape Horn)
  - Crown Lyell
  - Flux Quarry
  - Iron Blow – site lost with opening of the large open cut
  - Lyell Blocks
  - Open Cut (see also West Lyell Open Cut)
  - Prince Lyell
  - Royal Tharsis Open cut
  - Royal Tharsis underground
  - Tharsis
  - Twelve West
  - West Lyell (also known as the West Lyell Open Cut)
  - West Tharsis
- North Farrell Mine, Tullah
- North Mount Lyell, Gormanston
- Oonah Mine, Zeehan
- Queen Jukes, Mount Jukes
- Prince Darwin, Mount Darwin
- Razorback Mine, Dundas
- Renison Bell Mine, Renison Bell
- Silver Queen Mine, Zeehan
- Silversteam Mine, Zeehan
- Spray Mine, Zeehan
- Susanite Mine, Zeehan
- Tasmanian Copper Mine, Rosebery
- Taylours Reward, Mount Jukes
- Tenth Legion Mine, Zeehan
- West Comet Mine, Dundas

== List of mining field names ==
There are also designated mineral or mining 'fields' by government authority.

- Dundas
- Jukes-Darwin Mining Field
- Mount Farrell Mining Field
- North Dundas
- North Heemskirk
- Read – Rosebery
- Rosebery
- South Heemskirk
- Zeehan

== Mining fields 1881-1890 ==
Earlier informally named areas - Source: Binks 1988 - map 3 - pages 54–55

- Corrinna alluvial gold field
- South Heemskirk tin field
- Zeehan silver-lead field
- Dundas silver-lead field
- North East Dundas gold field, Ring River
- King River gold mine
- Princess River gold mine
- Linda gold field

== Smelters ==
- Crotty
- Mount Lyell
- Tasmanian Metals Extraction Company, Rosebery, smelter

== Training and educational ==
- Mt Lyell School of Mines and Industries in Queenstown
- Zeehan School of Mines and Metallurgy

== See also ==
- Geology of Tasmania
- West Coast Range
