= Gormanston railway station, Tasmania =

Former railway station in Tasmania, Australia

Gormanston railway station was a short lived railway station in Gormanston, Tasmania at the highest location on the North Mount Lyell Railway. It was situated on the lower northern slopes of Mount Owen in the Linda Valley, just east of the Iron Blow. The Gormanston station and branch line opened on the 7th of October 1901.

Construction began in July 1900, with a predicted opening date of December that year. This prediction was too ambitious, as the line did not open until almost a year later. The 2 mile 24 chain branch line opened on the 17th of October 1901, with a final cost of 26,000 pounds at the time.

Despite its short lifespan, it was considered an important point to have been reached by the railway. The spur to the Gormanston station from Gormanston Junction, on the modern Lyell Highway near Linda, was the shortest lived operating 3ft6in steel railway line in Tasmanian railway history.

In the short operational times of the North Mount Lyell Railway, Gormanston was served by all passenger trains proceeding from Linda to Pillinger or vice-versa. They would stop at Gormanston Junction, head up the hill to Gormanston, then return to the Junction and continue on their way. Immediately after the Mount Lyell Mining Company took over operations, all trains terminated at Gormanston instead of Linda. Despite this, mere months later the spur, and Gormanston station, closed on the 10th of September 1903.
