= Pillinger =

Pillinger may refer to:

- Colin Pillinger (1943–2014), a British planetary scientist
- 15614 Pillinger, an asteroid
- Pillinger, Tasmania, an abandoned port
