= Eldon River =

River in Tasmania, Australia

Eldon
- Location of the Eldon River mouth in Tasmania

Location
- Country: Australia
- State: Tasmania
- Region: West Coast

Physical characteristics
- Source: Eldon Range
  - location: below Eldon Bluff
  - coordinates: 41°59′15″S 145°47′35″E
  - elevation: 991 m (3,251 ft)
- Mouth: Confluence with the South Eldon River to form the King River
  - coordinates: 42°00′46″S 145°41′36″E
  - elevation: 242 m (794 ft)
- Length: 21 km (13 mi)

Basin features
- River system: King River catchment
- Reservoir: Lake Burbury

The Eldon River, part of the King River catchment, is a perennial river located in the West Coast region of Tasmania, Australia.

== Course and features ==
The Eldon River rises on the slopes of the Eldon Range below Eldon Bluff, located to the east of the West Coast Range, and flows generally north, west and then south, before reaching its confluence with the South Eldon River and emptying into the King River, dammed to form Lake Burbury. The river descends 750 metres (2,460 ft) over its 21-kilometre (13 mi) course.

The Eldon River was a reference point for early-twentieth-century tracks in the region.

Patsy Crawford in her book about the King River describes the explorer diary of Charles Gould, who named features in the area.

== See also ==
- Rivers of Tasmania
