= Robert Richard =

Australia-based Anglican priest (died 1929)

Robert Henry Richard was an Anglican priest in Australia during the late 19th and early 20th centuries.

Richard was educated at St David's College, Lampeter and ordained in 1893. After curacies in Newport, West Derby, Handsworth and Howden, he travelled to Australia. Richard held incumbencies at New Norfolk, Zeehan, Queenstown and Wynyard, Tasmania. During World War One he was a Chaplain to the Australian Armed Forces. He was Archdeacon of Hobart from 1923 until his death in 1929.

Richard was commended for his heroic endeavours at the time of the North Mount Lyell disaster.
