= Crotty, Tasmania =

Former township in Tasmania, Australia

Crotty
- Town
- Coordinates: 42°11′S 145°37′E
- Country: Australia
- State: Tasmania
- Abolished: circa 1903

Crotty is the site of a former gazetted town in Western Tasmania, Australia. The town was on the southern bank of the King River, on the eastern lower slopes of Mount Jukes, below the West Coast Range. The locality was formerly named King River

== Townsite ==
The town reserve was gazetted on 5 June 1900. The town survey was completed in November 1900. By 1902 there had been development of over 150 dwellings, and 700 people living in the town. The last residents to move away left in 1928.

In photographs found in Geoffrey Blainey's The Peaks of Lyell, the foreground shows a bridge, the Baxter River bridge. This was a crucial connection for people travelling between the railway stopping places.

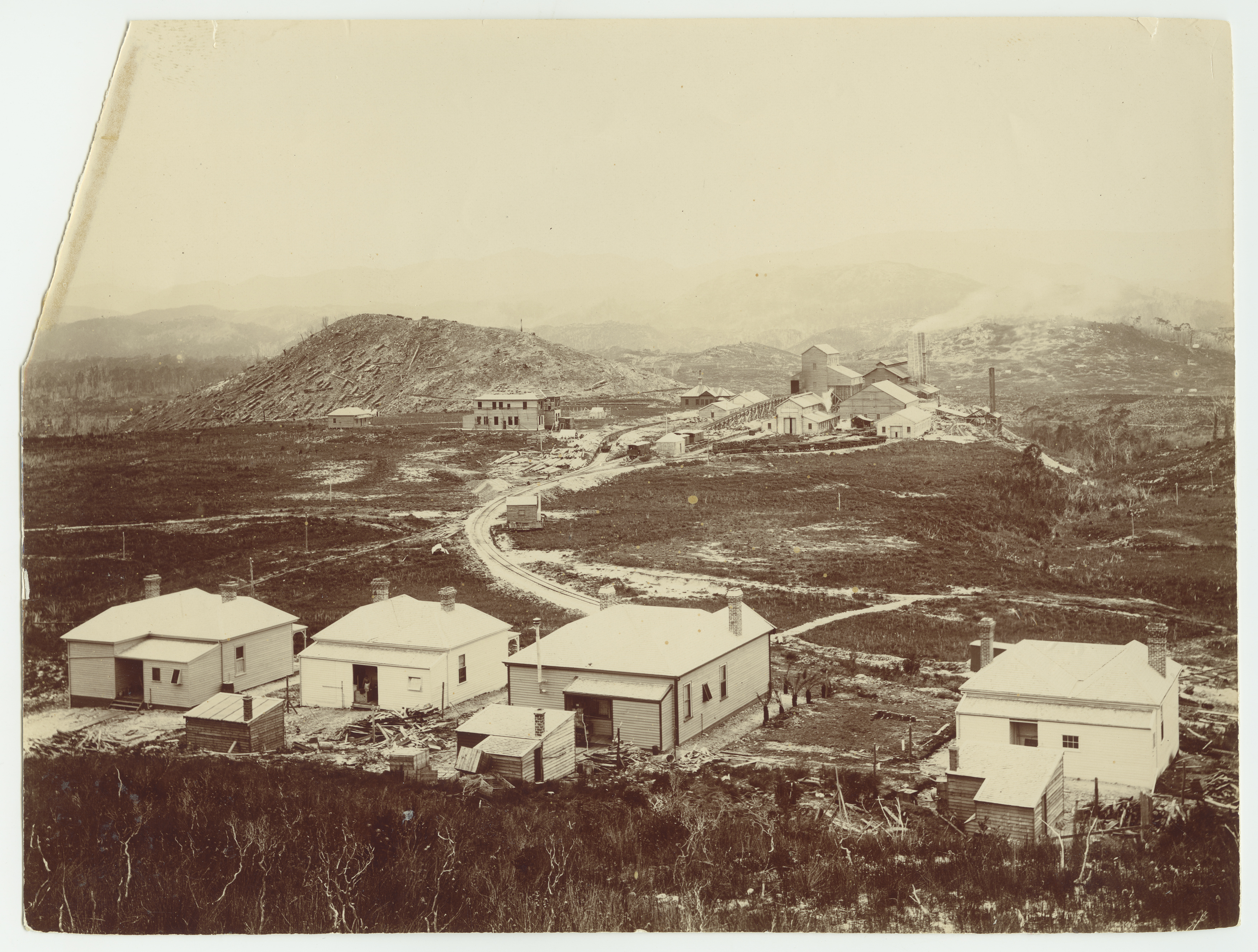
Crotty smelter and houses in 1902

== Smelters failure ==
At the turn of the twentieth century, the township had had a smelter and railway connection with the North Mount Lyell mine.

The North Mount Lyell smelters failed, despite attempts in 1901 and 1902 to correct issues. Initially, reverberatory furnaces were used, then water jacket furnaces were tried. The furnaces were broken further in an attempt to fix and were eventually left.

The company was absorbed by the Mount Lyell Mining and Railway Company in 1903.

The townsite soon lost population after the failure of smelter operations. The North Mount Lyell Railway which serviced Crotty's connections with Gormanston, Linda and Pillinger (Kelly Basin) remained in service for a couple of decades before closing.

Most historical photos of Crotty show the smelters, the hotels, and the very small houses/huts. The most iconic photograph is that found in Geoffrey Blainey's The Peaks of Lyell, dated 1902, which was taken from the embankment just east of the railway line, looking west, up the main street with the smoke from the smelter in the air, and Mount Jukes in the background.

== Hydro dam era ==
During the late 1970s and at an early stage in the "No Dams" campaign to stop the establishment of a dam on the Franklin River, a small group of musicians in Queenstown formed a group called the 'Crotty Ditty Band'.

During the building of the King power development in the 1980s, the Hydro Crotty Camp was home to several hundred dam construction workers

In the 1990s the townsite was inundated by Lake Burbury after Crotty Dam was installed as a part of the King River Power development scheme. Despite this, the Tasmanian 1:25000 Owen map still identifies the Proclaimed Town of Crotty. During 2016, Lake Burbury receded to a historically low level and remains of the town became visible.

On the eastern shores of Lake Burbury, the land south of the Lyell Highway, and adjacent to the Franklin-Gordon Wild Rivers National Park, is known as the Crotty Conservation Area. This has an area of 44.2 square kilometres (17.1 sq mi) and was established on 27 December 2000.

== See also ==
- Darwin Dam
- Crotty Dam
- West Coast Tasmania Mines
