= Mount Lyell (Tasmania) =

Mountain in Tasmania, Australia

- Location within Tasmania

Highest point
- Elevation: 917 m (3,009 ft)
- Coordinates: 42°03′00″S 145°36′36″E

Geography
- Location: Western Tasmania, Australia
- Parent range: West Coast

Climbing
- Easiest route: Scramble but not from west (mining area)

Mount Lyell is a mountain in the West Coast Range of Western Tasmania, Australia.

Mount Lyell has an elevation of 917 metres (3,009 ft) above sea level. The adjacent mountains are Mount Sedgwick to the north and Mount Owen to the south.

The mountain was named by Charles Gould in 1863 after geologist Charles Lyell, a supporter of Charles Darwin.

Mount Lyell was also the common short name of the Mount Lyell Mining and Railway Company.

== Mining activity ==
The Mount Lyell company operations centred mainly on the shoulder between Mount Owen and Mount Lyell, and to the western side of the mountain. On the eastern side of the shoulder were the old North Mount Lyell workings, where the 1912 North Mount Lyell Disaster occurred.

There was a small operation in the early days of the mining operation that was on the northern side of Mount Lyell, known as the Comstock mine. In the late twentieth century, just west of the Comstock workings was a section of the mine known as Cape Horn. The western end of the mountain has been named Cape Horn Spur, as the Mount Lyell Mining and Railway Company had a mine called Cape Horn in the 1970s at the west end of this spur.

== Railway lines ==
A railway line was planned to travel from Linda in the Linda Valley, around the southern, eastern and northern sides of Mount Lyell. The formation was built but the line was never utilised.

The sides of the mountain have been subjected to bush fires, smelter fumes and high rainfall, consequently the resultant vegetation and the legacy of tree stumps give the southern sides of the mountain a unique appearance.

== See also ==
- List of highest mountains of Tasmania
- West Coast Tasmania Mines

== Bibliography ==
- Blainey, Geoffrey (2000). The Peaks of Lyell (6th ed.). Hobart: St. David's Park Publishing. ISBN 0-7246-2265-9.
- Whitham, Charles (2003). Western Tasmania - A land of riches and beauty (Reprint 2003 ed.). Queenstown: Municipality of Queenstown.
  - 2003 edition – Queenstown: Municipality of Queenstown.
  - 1949 edition – Hobart: Davies Brothers. OCLC 48825404; ASIN B000FMPZ80
  - 1924 edition – Queenstown: Mount Lyell Tourist Association. OCLC 35070001; ASIN B0008BM4XC
