= Crotty Dam =

Dam in Tasmania, Australia

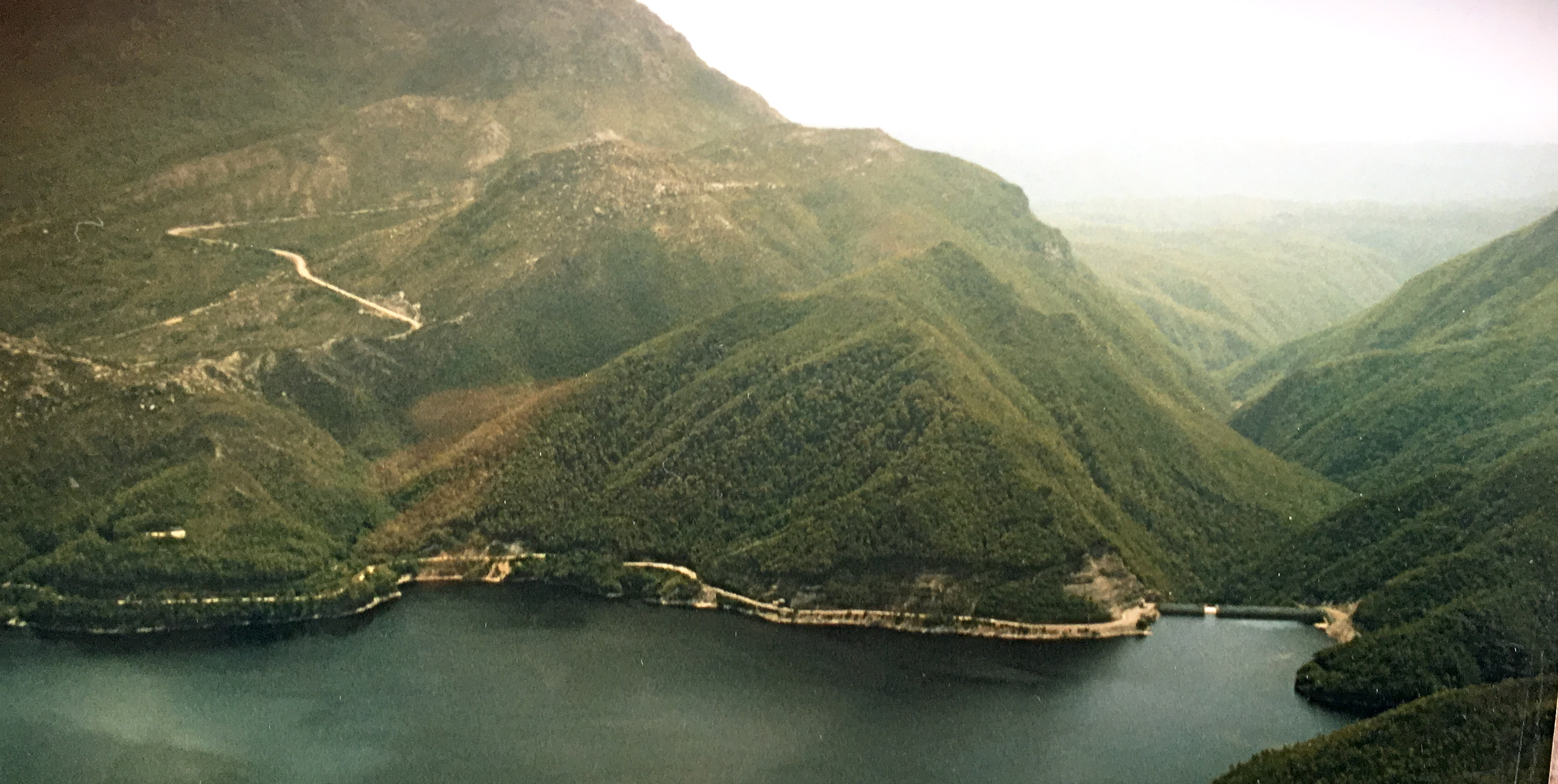
- Crotty Dam (at right) aerial shot from the east

- Location of the dam in Tasmania
- Interactive map of Crotty Dam
- Country: Australia
- Location: West Coast Tasmania
- Coordinates: 42°09′37″S 145°37′00″E
- Purpose: Power
- Status: Operational
- Opening date: 1991
- Owner: Hydro Tasmania

Dam and spillways
- Type of dam: Rock-fill dam
- Impounds: King River
- Height: 83 m (272 ft)
- Length: 245 m (804 ft)
- Width (crest): 300 mm (12 in)
- Dam volume: 770×10^{3} m^{3} (27×10^{6} cu ft)
- Spillways: 1
- Spillway type: Controlled and uncontrolled
- Spillway capacity: 245 m^{3}/s (8,700 cu ft/s) chute on dam face; 190 m^{3}/s (6,700 cu ft/s) valve in tunnel

Reservoir
- Creates: Lake Burbury
- Total capacity: 1,081,420 ML (876,720 acre⋅ft)
- Active capacity: 1,065,000 ML (863,000 acre⋅ft)
- Catchment area: 559 km^{2} (216 sq mi)
- Surface area: 5,325 ha (13,160 acres)
- Normal elevation: 229 m (751 ft) AHD

John Butters Power Station
- Coordinates: 42°09′21″S 145°32′04″E
- Operator: Hydro Tasmania
- Commission date: 1992
- Type: Conventional
- Hydraulic head: 184 m (604 ft)
- Turbines: 1 x 144 MW (193,000 hp); Fuji Frnacis-type
- Installed capacity: 144 MW (193,000 hp)
- Capacity factor: 0.9
- Annual generation: 576 GWh (2,070 TJ)
- Website hydro.com.au

The Crotty Dam, also known during construction as the King Dam, or the King River Dam on initial approval, is a concrete-faced rockfill embankment dam across the King River, between Mount Jukes and Mount Huxley, in the West Coast region of Tasmania, Australia. Completed in 1991, the resultant reservoir, Lake Burbury, was established for the purpose of generating hydro-electric power via the John Butters Power Station. The dam, its reservoir, and the power station are owned and operated by Hydro Tasmania.

== Dam and reservoir overview ==
=== History ===
In the 1910s the Mount Lyell Mining & Railway Company had investigated and surveyed a site very close to this dam for a proposed hydro electric scheme. Charles Whitham also wrote of the inevitability of the dam in 1927 and even proposed "Lake Dorothy" as a name for the reservoir.

Construction of the dam commenced in the 1980s following the Franklin Dam controversy, and the reservoir was flooded in 1991. The dam was named in honour of James Crotty who founded the North Mount Lyell Copper Mine at the turn of the 20th century. A ghost town site of the eponymous Crotty was submerged by the waters of Lake Burbury; as was the settlement of Darwin.

=== Technical details ===
The Crotty Dam, together with the Darwin Dam, are two major dams that form the headwaters for the King River Hydroelectric Power Development. The dam is located in the upper reaches of the King River gorge where the river breaks through the West Coast Range. It captures the high rainfall in the catchment of the King River and allows diversion of water through a tunnel to the John Butters Power Station downstream of the dam.

The concrete-faced rock-filled dam wall is 83 metres (272 ft) high and 245 metres (804 ft) long. When full, Lake Burbury has capacity of 1,081,420 megalitres (876,720 acre⋅ft) and covers 53,250 hectares (131,600 acres), draw from a catchment area of 559 square kilometres (216 sq mi). The single controlled and uncontrolled spillway is capable of discharging 435 cubic metres per second (15,400 cu ft/s).

==== Spillway ====
The spillway is located on the embankment, rather than on one of the rock abutments. This unique spillway approach had never been successfully attempted before in the design of dams of any significant height, due to problems in making allowance for embankment settlements. In the case of the Crotty Dam, the embankment was partly composed of well graded gravels, and thus a very high modulus of embankment deformation was achieved. The high modulus limits embankment settlements. Additionally, the spillway was designed to articulate in order to accommodate any settlement that did occur and to allow sufficient time for a large jet flow valve in the diversion tunnel to be opened so that larger floods can be safely handled.

The spillway designers, Sergio Giudici, also the chief engineer on the Gordon Dam, Frank Kinstler, Steven Li, Tony Morse and Graeme Maher were acknowledged within the engineering community because the spillway was the first known to provide for articulation of the spillway structure so that movements in its foundations could occur without damage to the overlying structure. In 2001, Engineers Australia selected Crotty Dam as one of the 25 dams with the greatest Australian heritage value and it was awarded a Historic Engineering Marker as part of the Engineering Heritage Recognition Program.

=== Reservoir ===
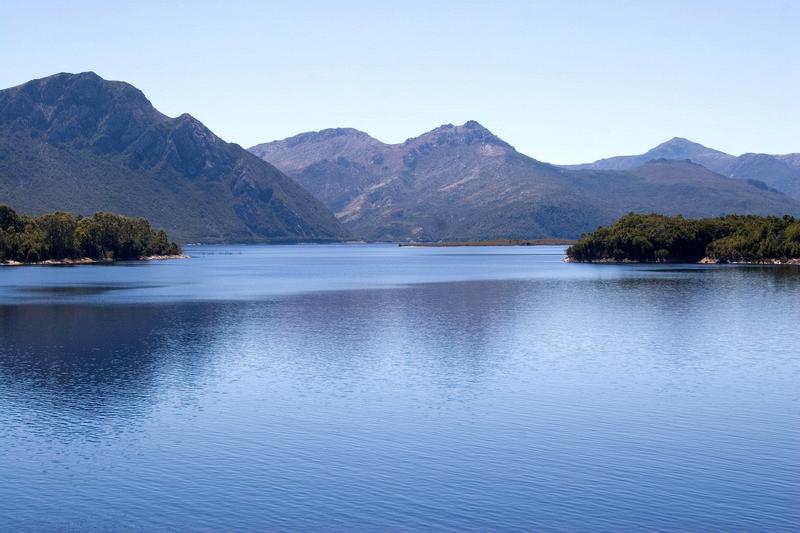
Looking north across the reservoir, from Bradshaw Bridge

Named in honour of Stanley Burbury, a former Governor of Tasmania, Lake Burbury is fed mainly by rivers from the north, including the upper King, Nelson, Princess, and Eldon rivers that drain the West Coast Range and include the Linda Valley. A natural lake, known as Lake Beatrice, lies just north of the reservoir's northern shore which is below the eastern end of Mount Sedgwick. Part of the reservoir is crossed by the Bradshaw Bridge (Note: Named after the family that owned and operated the sawmill that was inundated at Princess River.) to connect with the Lyell Highway.

When it was impounded, the historical sites of Crotty and Darwin were flooded, the bridge of the North Mount Lyell Railway over the King River was not salvaged, and significant portions of the Kelly Basin Road were inundated. The dam and its reservoir were identified as "indicative places" on the (now defunct) Register of the National Estate.

==== Recreation ====
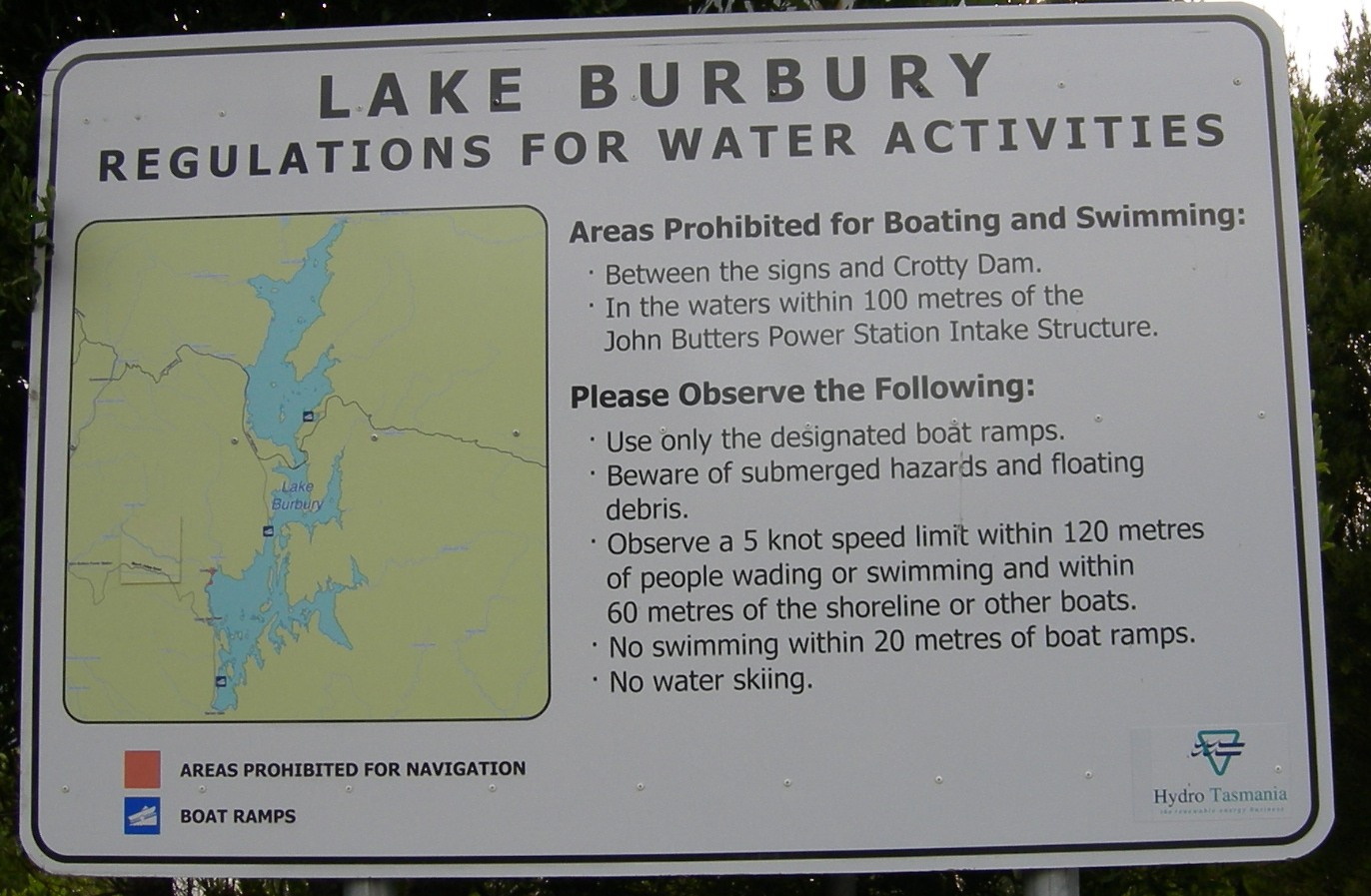
A regulation sign at the reservoir

The reservoir is popular for fishing and anglers should be aware that the area is susceptible to extreme weather. A webcam is located on the south east shore of the lake which looks across to where the Lyell Highway emerges from the Linda Valley and moves south around the eastern base of Mount Owen and vision of fishing conditions may be viewed remotely.

The reservoir lies to the west of the Franklin-Gordon Wild Rivers National Park and has a series of buffer zone conservation areas; the Princess River Conservation Area and the Crotty Conservation Area on the east shore, and the West Coast Range Regional Reserve on the west. Access to the reservoir's shore is limited below 242 metres (794 ft) AHD, which is above the full supply level of 235 metres (771 ft) AHD. Access is also restricted on the island created by the impoundment.

== Hydroelectric power station ==
The John Butters Power Station was commissioned by the Hydro Electric Commission (TAS) in 1992 as part of the King – Yolande River Power Scheme that comprises three hydroelectric power stations. Located 8 kilometres (5.0 mi) below the dam wall, near the King River confluence with the Queen River, the power station is fed by water from Lake Burbury, and to the south by Darwin Dam. Water flow to the station is via a long headrace tunnel from the Crotty Dam via a 6.5-kilometre-long (4.0 mi) unlined headrace tunnel that runs through Mount Jukes, and a 500-metre-long (1,600 ft) steel lined power tunnel.

Built by the HEC, it was one of the last power stations constructed before its disaggregation and transformation to Hydro Tasmania. The station has one Fuji Francis turbines with a generating capacity of 144 megawatts (193,000 hp) of electricity. Within the station building, the turbine has a half embedded spiral casing controlled via a spherical rotary inlet valve and a vertical lift, gravity closed intake gate designed to cut off full flow. The station output, estimated to be 576 gigawatt-hours (2,070 TJ) annually, is fed to TasNetworks' transmission grid via a 13.8 kV/220 kV three-phase Fuji generator transformer to the outdoor switchyard.

The station is remotely controlled from the Sheffield Control Centre.

=== Etymology ===
The power station was named in honour of John Butters, the first general manager and chief engineer of Hydro Tasmania. When the King power scheme was approved by the Tasmanian Government the name on hydro plans for the proposed power station at that time was the Newall Power station.

== See also ==
- List of power stations in Tasmania
- List of reservoirs and dams in Tasmania
- List of lakes in Tasmania
