= North Mount Lyell disaster =

Mining disaster in 1912 in Western Tasmania,

The North Mount Lyell disaster (also known as the Mount Lyell disaster and North Mount Lyell fire) refers to a fire that broke out on 12 October 1912 at the Mount Lyell Mining and Railway Company operations on the West Coast of Tasmania, killing 42 miners. The mine had been taken over from the North Mount Lyell Company in 1903.

== Events ==
Sometime between 11:15 and 11:30 am on 12 October the pump house on the 700-foot (210 m) level of the mine was reported on fire. As the mine lacked an emergency warning system, those aware of the fire were forced to run along its levels and drives warning others. Of the 170 miners working in the mine, 73 managed to escape that first day. However many, including those who had been working in remote stopes, were trapped. Outside the mine, uncertainty surrounded the status of the fire and the number of miners remaining inside. Initial rescue attempts proved difficult, and repeated attempts to enter the mine failed.

The rescue plan involved the transportation of breathing equipment from one of the Victorian mining towns to Queenstown, via a speedy shipping across the Bass Strait and the alleged fastest times by engines on the Emu Bay Railway, the Government Strahan–Zeehan Railway line between Zeehan and Regatta Point, and from there by the Abt line to Queenstown. Such was their rush to get the rescue gear to the mine, the SS Loongana, the ship which crossed Bass Strait carrying the equipment, made the crossing in 13 hours, 35 minutes – a record which stood for many years. Also the train travelling times between Burnie and Queenstown were never bettered.

Once the rescue equipment arrived, rescuers were able to enter the mine. On the 700-foot (210 m) level, a rescue party came across a group of deceased miners. One of these miners, a man named Joe McCarthy, had left a note pinned to a timber:

Seven hundred level. North Lyell mine, 12-10-12.
If anyone should find this note convey to my wife.
Dear Agnes. - I will say good-bye. Sure I will not see you again any more.
I am pleased to have made a little provision for you and poor little Lorna.
Be good to our little darling.
My mate, Len Burke, is done, and poor old V. and Driver too.
Good-bye, with love to all.
Your loving husband, Joe McCarthy.

On 14 October, rescuers lowered 1,100 feet (340 m) of rope with a signal gong attached to the end down the main shaft of the mine. Late in the afternoon, rescuers heard a rap of the line. When the rope was pulled up, a handkerchief wrapped around a tobacco tin was found attached to it. Inside the tin was a penciled note:

40 men in 40 stope. Send food and candles at once. No time to lose. J. Ryan

Following this discovery, rescue efforts intensified, and firemen were able to descend to the 1,000-foot (300 m) level and rescue all the men trapped below. Rescue efforts lasted for four days with the last of the survivors brought to the surface more than 100 hours after the fire began.

== Aftermath ==
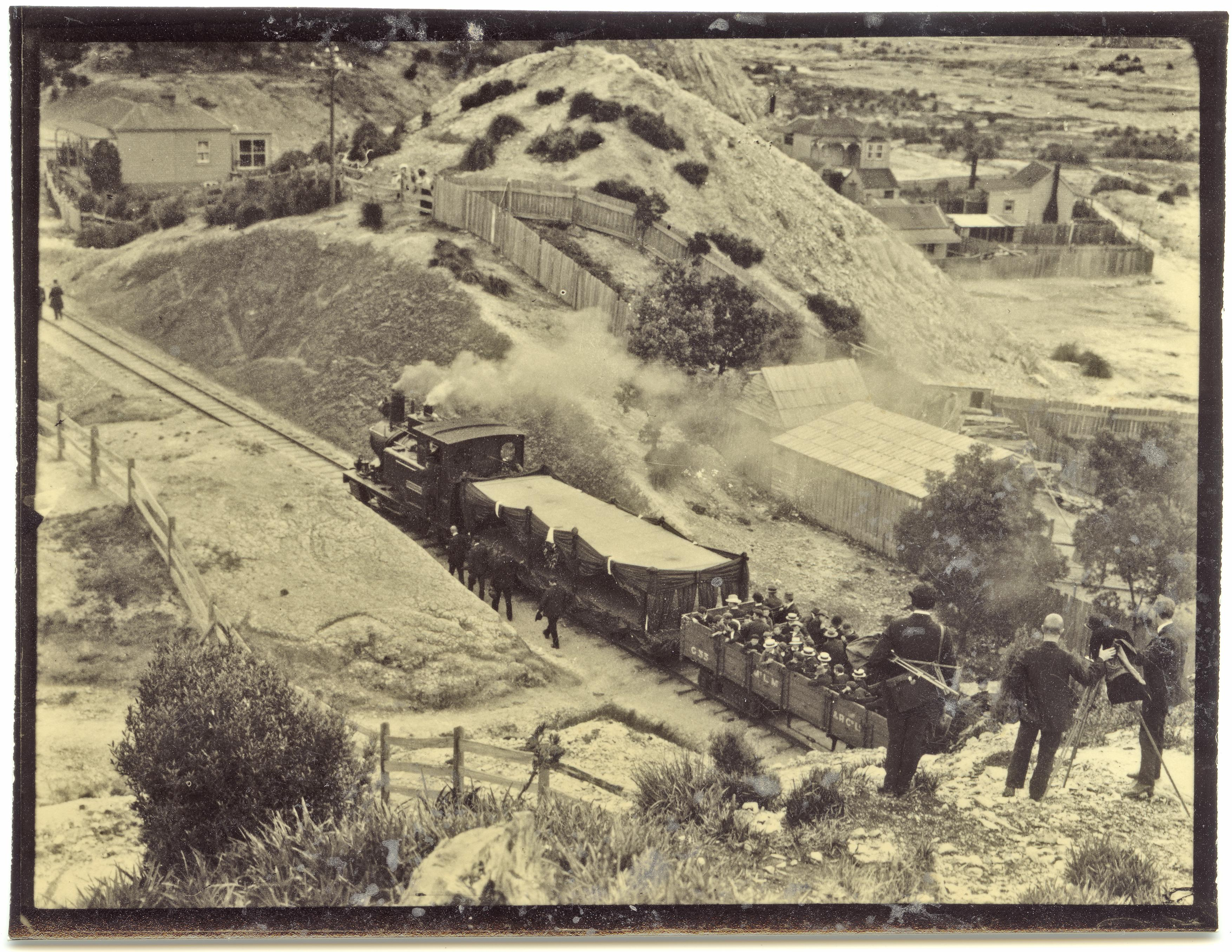
procession

As a result of the fire, initially 42 people died; the bodies were buried in unmarked graves in the Queenstown General cemetery. Initially, the first two bodies to be recovered were buried in the Linda Cemetery, however when the final victim (John Bourke) was recovered, the pair were buried at Queenstown at the same time as Bourke.

One of the miners, Albert Gadd, who escaped death and then re-entered the mine to assist in the rescue efforts, was hospitalised in Launceston and died on 20 February 1913 from carbon monoxide poisoning. Gadd, whose wife was delivered of a son two months later, can be regarded as the 43rd victim of the mining tragedy. He was posthumously awarded the Clarke Gold Medal from the Royal Humane Society in Melbourne. Silver medals were awarded to 30 rescuers, among them engineer Russell Mervyn Murray, later the mine's general manager.

== Royal Commission ==
The royal commission that was held at the time of the retrieval of bodies after the fire, and despite various theories as to the cause of the fire, an open verdict remained.

Although Blainey covers the details of the disaster in The Peaks of Lyell, writing 40 years after the event, there were still variations upon the "official" versions of the event, amongst "old timers" in Queenstown. Some of these are aired and detailed in Bradshaw's verbatim record of the newspaper reports and the royal commission, as well as being incorporated into Crawford's recent novel.

A number of themes arise from reading Blainey, and others on the subject: the rise of trade unionism on the west coast at the time, and the lack of preparedness for such disasters by the mining companies. Also one recurring theme in some of the stories was the rumour or suggestion of the presence of a woman disguised as a man working underground.

At the Centenary of the event at the Queenstown Heritage and Arts Festival Peter Schulze's book An Engineer Speaks of Lyell elaborates an argument that the most likely cause of the fire was an electrical fault as a result of faulty installation of the pump motor at the 700 ft level. Schulze, who had access to more documents than Blainey and the twin advantages of an electrical engineering background and mining experience, concludes that the Royal Commission process was manipulated to give a result that best suited the company, for whom an adverse finding could have been financially ruinous. It was especially at fault for naming the suspected arsonist, against whom there was no evidence apart from his prominence as a Union leader. He concedes that following the accident the Company followed best practice in mine management and labour relations.

== Casualties ==
This list of victim details is compiled from the following sources:

- Names - Archives Office of Tasmania Tasmanian inquest number 13222
- Ages and places of origin - Queenstown Cemetery's records, these details completed by families of the deceased
- Albert Gadd's information - Archives Office of Tasmania Tasmanian inquest number 13169.

Name	Status	Age	Address/Place of Origin	Notes
John Bawden	Single	25	England	Resided at Linda Valley, Tasmania. Had relatives living in Truro, Cornwall, England
Valentine Bianchini	Single	48	Austria	Identified by his earring
John (Jack) Bolton	Single	38	Gormanston, Tasmania	Resident of Gormanston, Tasmania
John Bourke	Single	24	Victoria	Mother lived at Daylesford, Victoria. His body was the last recovered.
William Henry Bowker	Married	42	Ballarat, Victoria	died 1 September 1919, aged 49 leaving a wife and 7 children
Samson Rodda Bray	Married	33	Bendigo, Victoria	Wife and one child living at Bendigo, Victoria
Louis Burke	Married	43	Sweden	Wife residing in Hobart, Tasmania
John Creeden	Married	46	Westbury, Tasmania	Identified by his gold crowned front tooth
James Davey	Married	37	Victoria	Wife and four children living at Linda Valley, Tasmania
Albert Mansfield Gadd	Married	32	Queenstown, Tasmania	Died 20 February 1913. Native of Hobart, Tasmania. He had 7 children, his wife pregnant with their eighth when he died. Albert was posthumously awarded the Clarke Gold Medal for bravery from the Royal Humane Society. His brother Gilbert was rescued from the1000ft level.
George Gard	Single	21	Queenstown, Tasmania	His married sister lived in Queenstown, Tasmania, and his mother lived in Victoria.
Thomas Gays	Single	22	Victoria	Gave up his place in the last rescue cage to a married man. Mr. Gays rose to the height of absolute heroism. The cage was ready to come up, when he saw a married man on the plat. He calmly stepped out of the cage into the blinding smoke and sent it up the shaft. That was the last cage that left.
Charles Green	Single	22	Launceston, Tasmania	Native of Launceston, Tasmania
Francis Henry Guy	Married	27	Victoria	Wife and three children residing in Queenstown, Tasmania
James Thomas Hall	Married	32	Mount Lyell, Tasmania	Brother rescued from the 1,000 ft level. Native of Campbell Town, Tasmania. Wife and two children living at North Lyell township.
Eden Aloysius Hills	Single	21	Hobart, Tasmania	Native of Hamilton, Tasmania. His sister lived in the area, whilst other relative residing in Hobart, Tasmania.
William Horne	Married	45	Black Lead or Buninyong, Victoria	Married with six children
John Jenkins	Married	28	Hobart, Tasmania	Wife of twelve months residing in Hobart, Tasmania
Henry Jones	Single	22	Hobart, Tasmania	Sister living in Queenstown, Tasmania. Neither parent living.
John Martin Leeman	Single	27	Victoria	Body identified by his brother Charles
Zephaniah Lewis	Married	41	Victoria	Wife and eight children living at Gormanston, Tasmania. Body identified by oldest son William.
Thomas Maher	Married	31	Victoria	Wife in Linda Valley, Tasmania
Joseph McCarthy	Married	40	New South Wales	Wife and child residing at Linda Valley, Tasmania. To them a letter pinned to the wall by a "spider", was addressed.
Eugene Felix McCasland	Single	27	New South Wales	Engaged to a girl from Linda Valley, Tasmania
Edmund Michael McCullagh	Single	49	Richmond, Tasmania	Lived with his sister and brother, Thomas, at Queenstown, Tasmania.
James Bede McGowan	Single	23	Queenstown, Tasmania	Identified by his brother Martin
Bernard. McLoughlin	Married	35	Ballarat, Victoria	Never saw his youngest child as it was born after he left for North Lyell
Arthur McMaster	Married	27	Victoria	Identified by brother-in-law, Thomas McHenry
Herbert John Mitchell	Single	23	Linda Valley, Tasmania	Mother living in Black Lead, Victoria
Peter Moore	Single	48	Ireland	Left a note for the landlady at the Boarding House, letting her know where to send warning if anything should befall him.
Cornelius O’Keefe	Single	26	Tasmania	Identified by his father, John
James Robert Park	Married	37	Victoria	No children, but wife, Annie Eleanor living in Linda Valley, Tasmania.
Christopher Quake	Single	50	Victoria	Formerly known as W.J. Smith, but better known by the nickname of "Speewa".
Patrick Reiley	Widower	46	Tasmania	Identified by his brother John. Native of Westbury, Tasmania. Resided in Linda Valley, Tasmania. Had three children, two daughters and a son, residing in Hobart.
Francis John Rolfe	Married	31	Victoria	Shift boss. Two children residing at Linda Valley, Tasmania.
James Roland Rolfe	Single	22	Victoria	Parents living at Malmsbury, Victoria. Rumours stated that he was the brother of Francis John Rolfe
Thomas Saunderson	Married	37	North Lyell, Tasmania	Had a wife named Wilhemina and a daughter named May.
Leonard Sydney Scott	Married	22	Victoria	Identified by his father-in-law, Charles Morley. He had a wife named Louisa and a six-week-old daughter named Violet. Native of Melbourne, Victoria.
James William Smith	Single	19	Tasmania	His mother was residing with Mrs O'Connor, Princess St, Port Melbourne.
John Studwell	Single	20	Tasmania	Father residing at Manly, N.S.W.. Formerly from Beaconsfield. Identified by the initials "J.S." tattooed on his left forearm.
James Tregonning	Single	18	Kyvalley, Victoria	Recently arrived from England with father Daniel Tregonning, and younger sister, Eva Frances Tregonning.
William Tregonning	Single	20	Kyvalley, Victoria	Recently arrived from England with father Daniel Tregonning, and younger sister, Eva Frances Tregonning.
Richard John Treverton	Married	34	Queenstown, Tasmania	Wife and two children residing at Queenstown, Tasmania. Better known as "Snowy".
Henry Wright	Married	54	North Lyell, Tasmania	Resided at Linda Valley, Tasmania. Two daughters; one aged 17, the other aged 23

== Centenary ==
The Queenstown Heritage and Arts Festival of 2012 celebrated the centenary of this event. Part of the celebrations included a collection of songs entitled Fire Underground performed by The West Coast Singers, an ensemble of vocalists organized and directed by Kerrie Maguire. The West Coast Singers toured Tasmania with this concert in the following months, including performances at the Cygnet and Tamar Valley Folk Festivals in January 2013. The tour wrapped up with a performance at the Paragon Theatre, Queenstown in June 2013, on the 100th anniversary of the last funeral of the disaster's victims.
