= Gormanston, Tasmania =

Gormanston Tasmania
- Coordinates: 42°04′25″S 145°35′50″E
- Population: 32 (2021 census)
- LGA(s): West Coast Council
- State electorate(s): Lyons
- Federal division(s): Lyons

Gormanston is a town in Tasmania on the slopes of Mount Owen, above the town of Queenstown in Tasmania's West Coast. In the 2021 census, Gormanston had a population of 32.

It lies at the shoulder between Mount Lyell and Mount Owen and is south or "up the hill" from an equally abandoned community, the remains of the townsite of Linda which is at the northern side of the Linda Valley.

== History ==
It was built as the company town for the Mount Lyell Mining and Railway Company operations at the Iron Blow open cut copper mine and later also became the location of the short lived terminus of the North Mount Lyell Railway at Gormanston railway station before it closed.

It may have been named in honour of Jenico Preston, 14th Viscount Gormanston, Governor of Tasmania 1893–1900.

Mount Lyell Post Office opened on 1 January 1891, was renamed Gormanston in 1894 and closed in 1979.

It is the only remaining townsite that lies in effect 'in' the West Coast Range.

It was a major settlement of employees of the Mount Lyell Mining and Railway Company, especially of those who were employed at parts of its workings that were located in the North Lyell and open cut areas. At the peak of its population and importance, Gormanston had its own local government authority, of which mine manager R. M. Murray was the long-standing Warden. The company also had a daily bus to take workers down to the mine and plant in Queenstown.

It was the nearest community to the 1912 North Mount Lyell Disaster and was used as a base by company officials attending to this disaster.

Considerable numbers of buildings have been removed to other locations, and the local government authority was absorbed into the new 'West Coast Council' and the adjacent Mount Lyell workings have been closed down.

It is the closest settlement to Lake Burbury, a hydro created lake from the damming of the King River.

There are currently no other settlement or other buildings on the Lyell Highway towards Hobart until Derwent Bridge.

There are booklets available in the Galley Museum in Queenstown, that give historical information about the town in its heyday, and in particular lists of registered inhabitants in the early 1900s.
