= Mt Lindsay mine =

Mine in Tasmania, Australia

Mount Lindsay Mine
- Location within Tasmania
- Location: Tasmania, Australia; 41°43′27″S 145°25′19″E
- Products: Tungsten
- Company: Venture Minerals

The Mount Lindsay Mine is a former tin mine located in the northwest of Tasmania, Australia. Mt Lindsay represents one of the largest tungsten reserves in Australia, having estimated reserves of 43 million tonnes of ore grading 0.1% tungsten. 40 million tonnes would support a 10-year mining operation. The mine is owned by Venture Minerals.

== See also ==
- List of mines in Australia
