= Macquarie Harbour =

Large inlet on the West Coast of Tasmania

- Parralaongatek
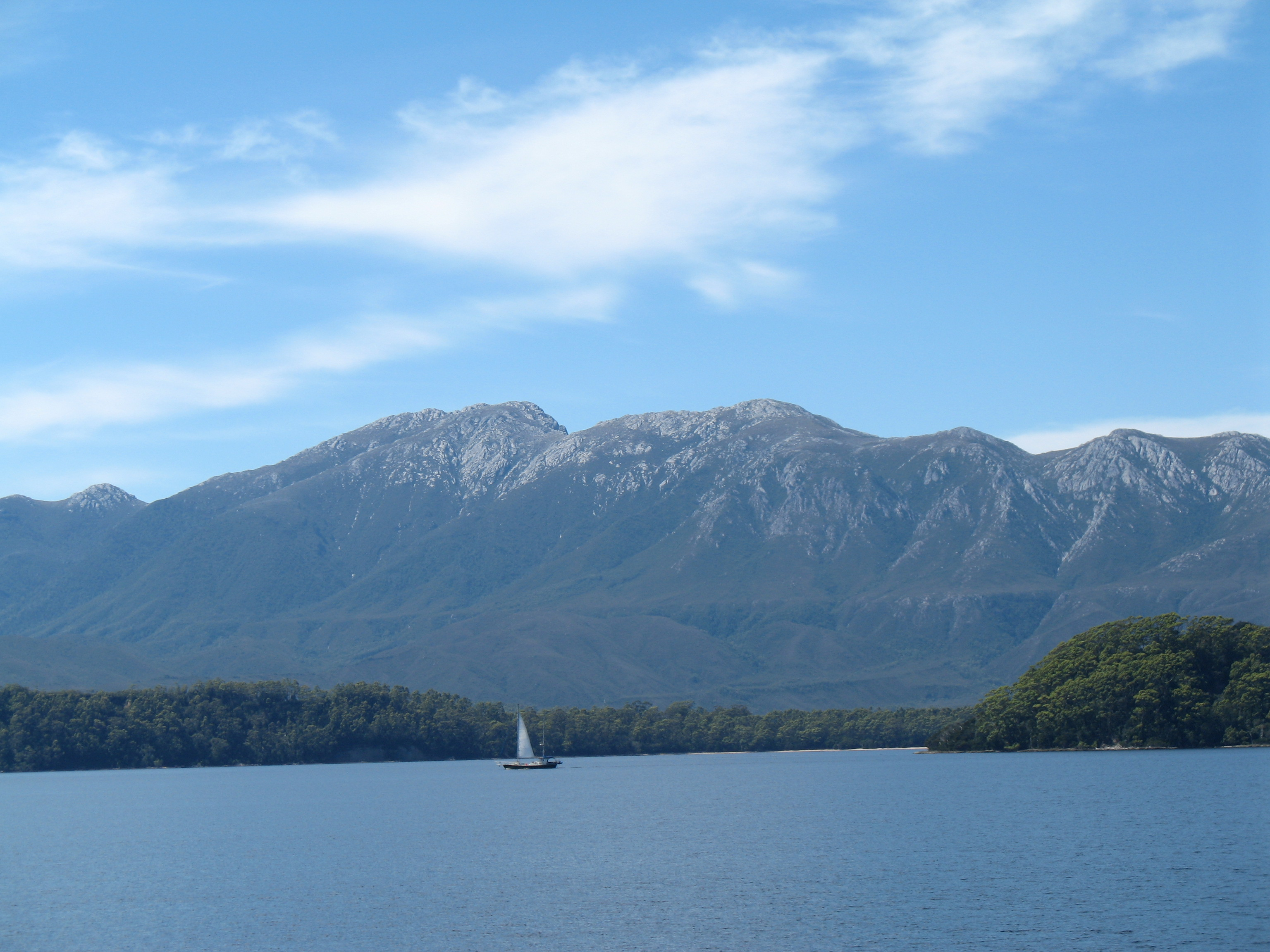
- A view across Macquarie Harbour (Mount Sorell at rear).

- Location in Tasmania

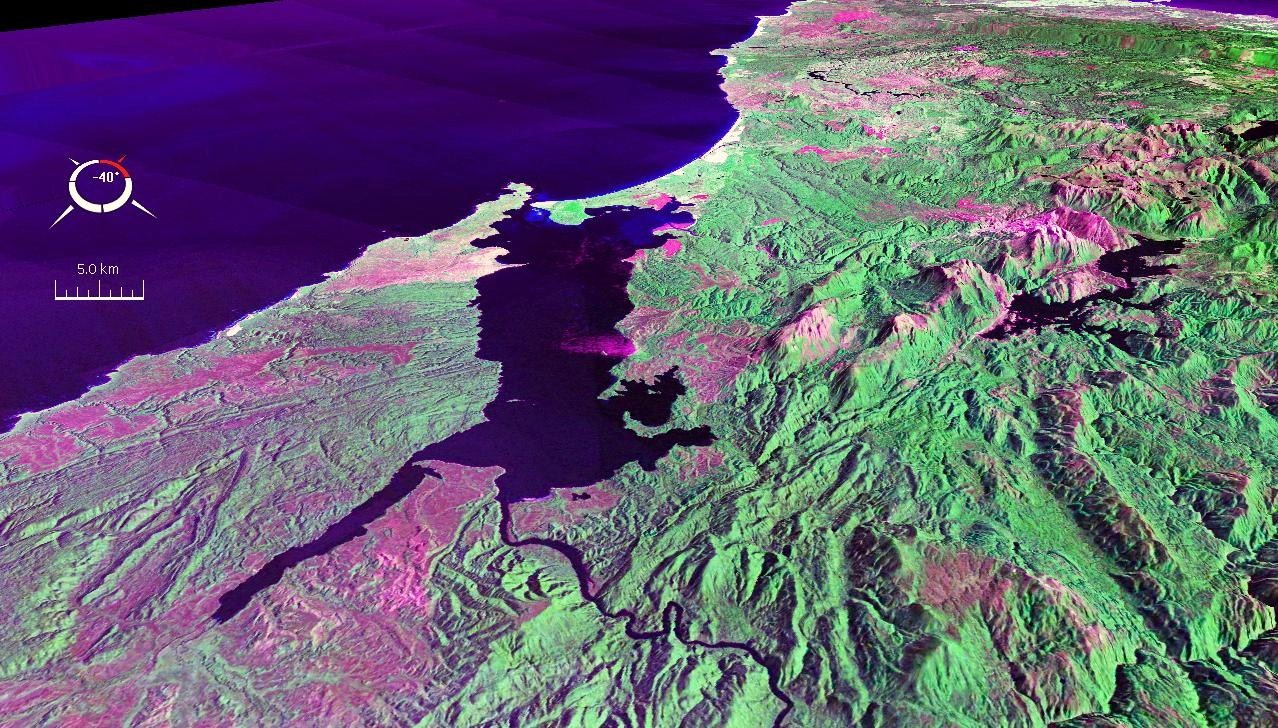
- False colour Landsat image centred on Macquarie Harbour, looking northwest, draped over digital elevation model with x2 vertical exaggeration; screen capture from the NASA World Wind
- Location: Western Tasmania
- Coordinates: 42°17′38″S 145°21′31″E
- Etymology: Lachlan Macquarie
- River sources: King River; Gordon River
- Ocean/sea sources: Southern Ocean
- Basin countries: Australia
- Islands: Sarah Island
- Sections/sub-basins: Birchs Inlet; Hells Gates; Kelly Basin; Regatta Point
- Settlements: Strahan

Macquarie Harbour is a shallow fjord in the West Coast region of Tasmania, Australia. It is approximately 315 square kilometres (122 mi^{2}), and has an average depth of 15 metres (49 ft), with deeper places up to 50 metres (160 ft). It is navigable by shallow-draft vessels. The main channel is kept clear by the presence of a rock wall on the outside of the channel's curve. This man-made wall prevents erosion and keeps the channel deep and narrow, rather than allowing the channel to become wide and shallow. A reported Aboriginal name for the harbour is Parralaongatek.

The harbour was named in honour of Scottish Major General Lachlan Macquarie, the fifth Colonial Governor of New South Wales.

== History ==
James Kelly wrote in his narrative First Discovery of Port Davey and Macquarie Harbour how he sailed from Hobart in a small open five-oared whaleboat to discover Macquarie Harbour on 28 December 1815.

However, different accounts of the journey have indicated different methods and dates of the discovery. In the commentary to the Historical Records of Australia, the editor notes that T.W. Birch stated before the commission of inquiry into the state of the colony in 1820 that Kelly had discovered Macquarie Harbour after proceeding along in a boat from Port Davey where they had travelled in the schooner Henrietta Packet. Kelly gave evidence before the commission, and did not mention any discoveries. In a letter dated 11 April 1816, preserved in the record office, London, T.W. Birch transmitted an account of this voyage, which records the discovery of Macquarie Harbour on 26 December 1815.

Charles Whitham notes variations on the date.

Surveyor-General Oxley of New South Wales in March 1820 battled with the seas around the heads and Hells Gates. Surveyor-General Evans travelled in the area in 1821–22.

In September 2020, almost 100 pilot whales were rescued from the harbour after becoming stranded. An estimated 350 whales which were unable to be rescued died.

== Convict era ==
The harbour was established as a prison which was a place of "extreme physical and mental torture". It was built for British convicts including Irish patriots but many Aboriginal Tasmanians were also detained there.

== Rivers ==
The King River which cuts through the West Coast Range and the Gordon River empty into Macquarie Harbour. The narrow entrance to Macquarie Harbour has hazardous tidal currents and is called Hell's Gates. Outside of the Harbour the entrance area is known as Macquarie Heads, and the most western point is Cape Sorell. The sheer volume of fresh water that pours into the harbour through the rivers, combined with the narrow exit result in barometric tides. When there is rain in the mountains surrounding the harbour, the tide rises, and it falls when the atmospheric pressure reverses and results in less rain.

The Queen River, King River and Macquarie Harbour were all polluted by mine waste from the Mount Lyell Mining and Railway Company until its closing in 1994. It is estimated that 100 million tonnes of tailings were disposed of into the Queen River. The Mount Lyell Remediation and Research and Demonstration Program was carried out by the office of Supervising Scientist and the Tasmanian Department of Environment and Land Management over the following two years. The result of the program a marked reduction in the waste material entering the rivers and harbour.

- Bird River – mouth of river in Kelly Basin
- Braddon River – mouth on mid-eastern shore
- Clark River – mouth at Pillinger, Kelly Basin.
- Gordon River – mouth on south eastern end of harbour
- King River – mouth at north east of harbour

== Islands ==
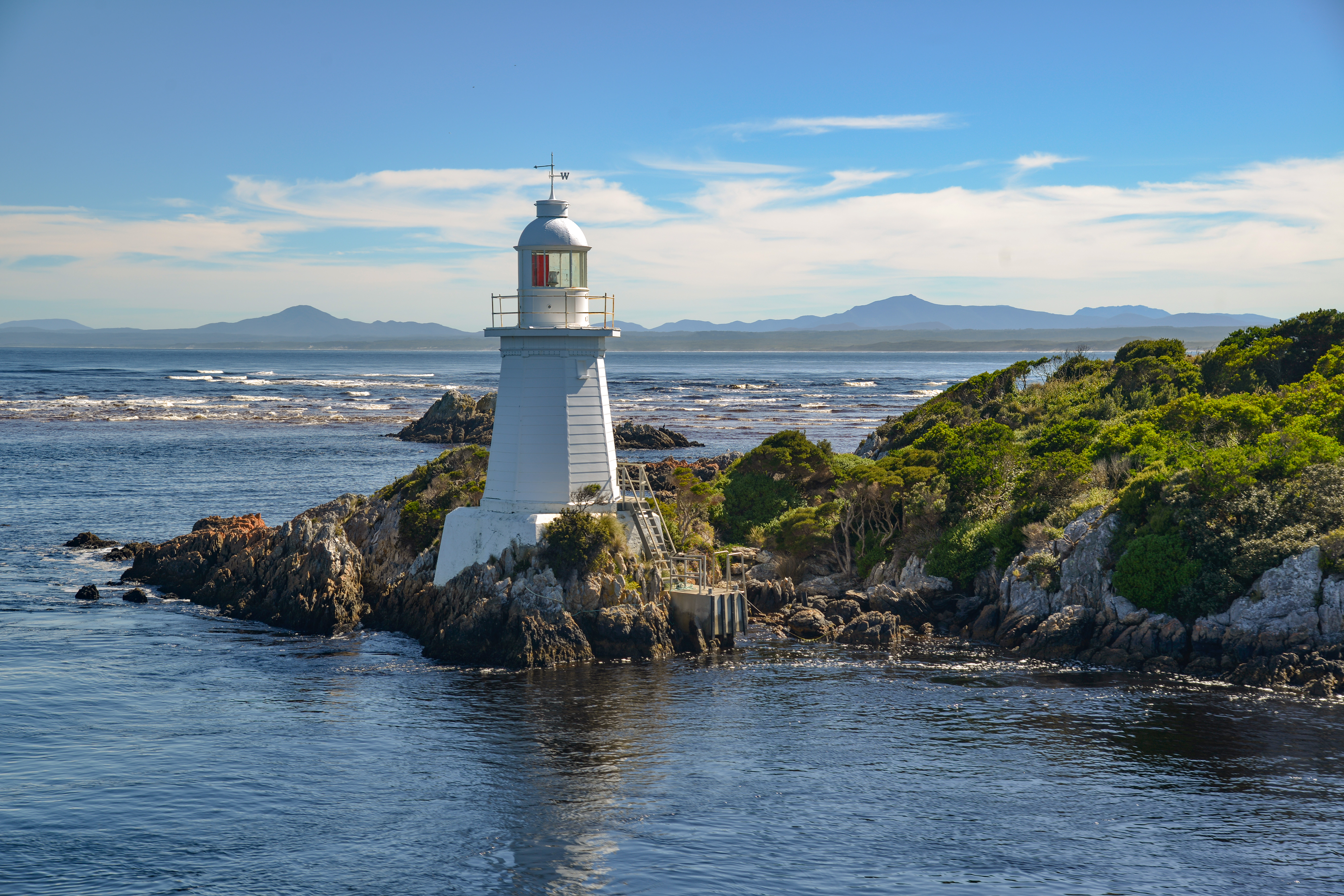
Photo of the lighthouse on Bonnet Island, Hells gate, Tasmania (looking out from Harbour)

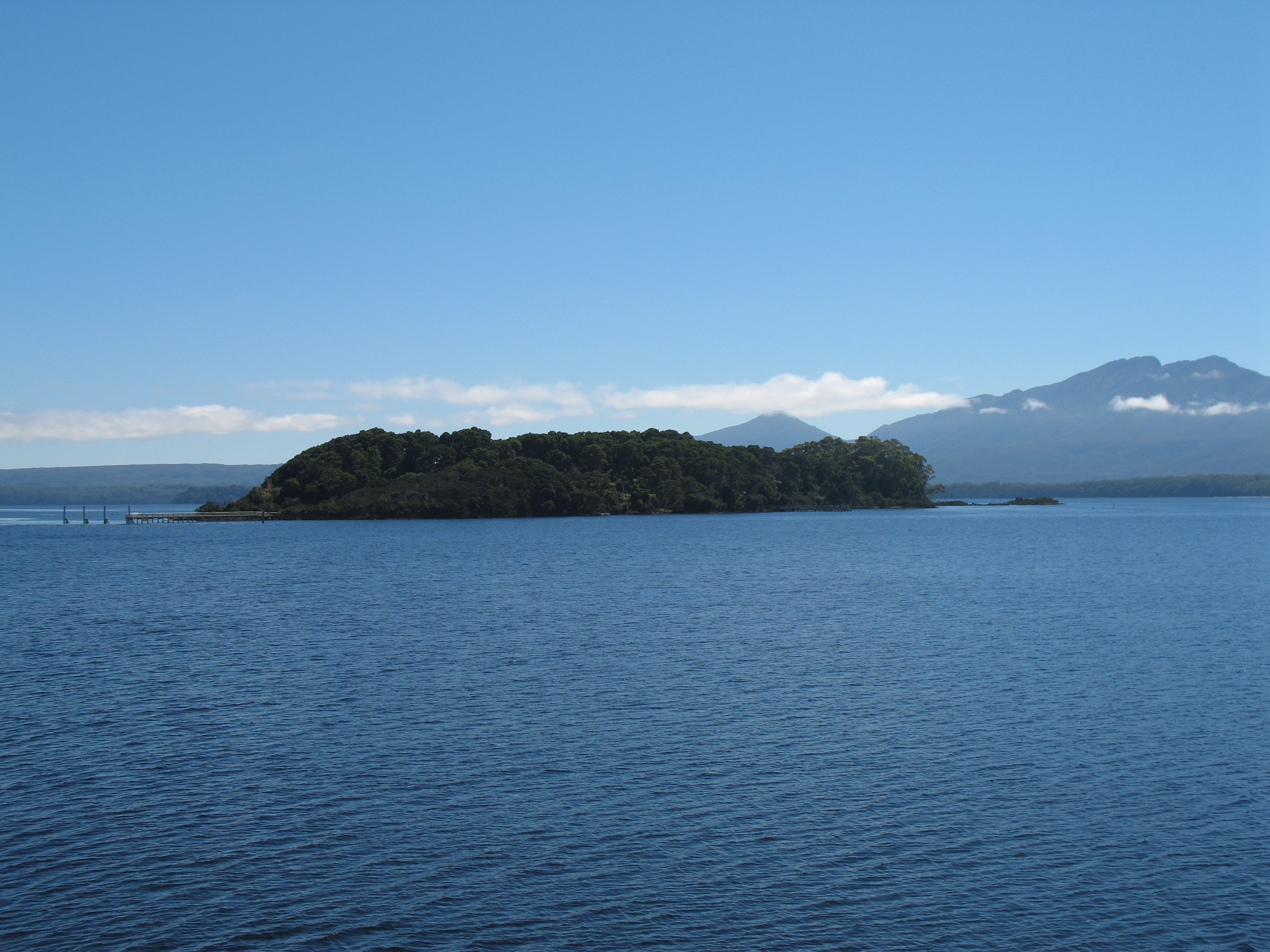
Sarah Island in Macquarie Harbour.

The Islands are regularly surveyed.

- Bonnet Island – in Kelly Channel at entrance to harbour (42° 13′ S, 145° 14′ E)
- Cat Island
- Elizabeth Island
- Entrance Island – at entrance to harbour (42° 12′ S, 145° 14′ E)
- Magazine Island
- Neck Island
- Philips Island – adjacent to mouth of Braddon River on east shore
- Sarah Island – in southern part of Harbour
- Soldiers Island

== Settlements ==
The first settlement at Macquarie Harbour was on Sarah Island, a small island in the harbour, named after the wife of Thomas William Birch. This island was used as a prison for recalcitrant prisoners from other settlements in Tasmania, due to its extreme isolation and extreme climate.

Later the small port of Strahan was developed on the shores of Macquarie Harbour to support the nearby mining settlements, mainly Queenstown. Another port was developed on the south east section of the harbour in Kelly Basin along with townsite of Pillinger. The settlement and port were short lived as was the North Mount Lyell company that developed the facilities.

== Named features ==
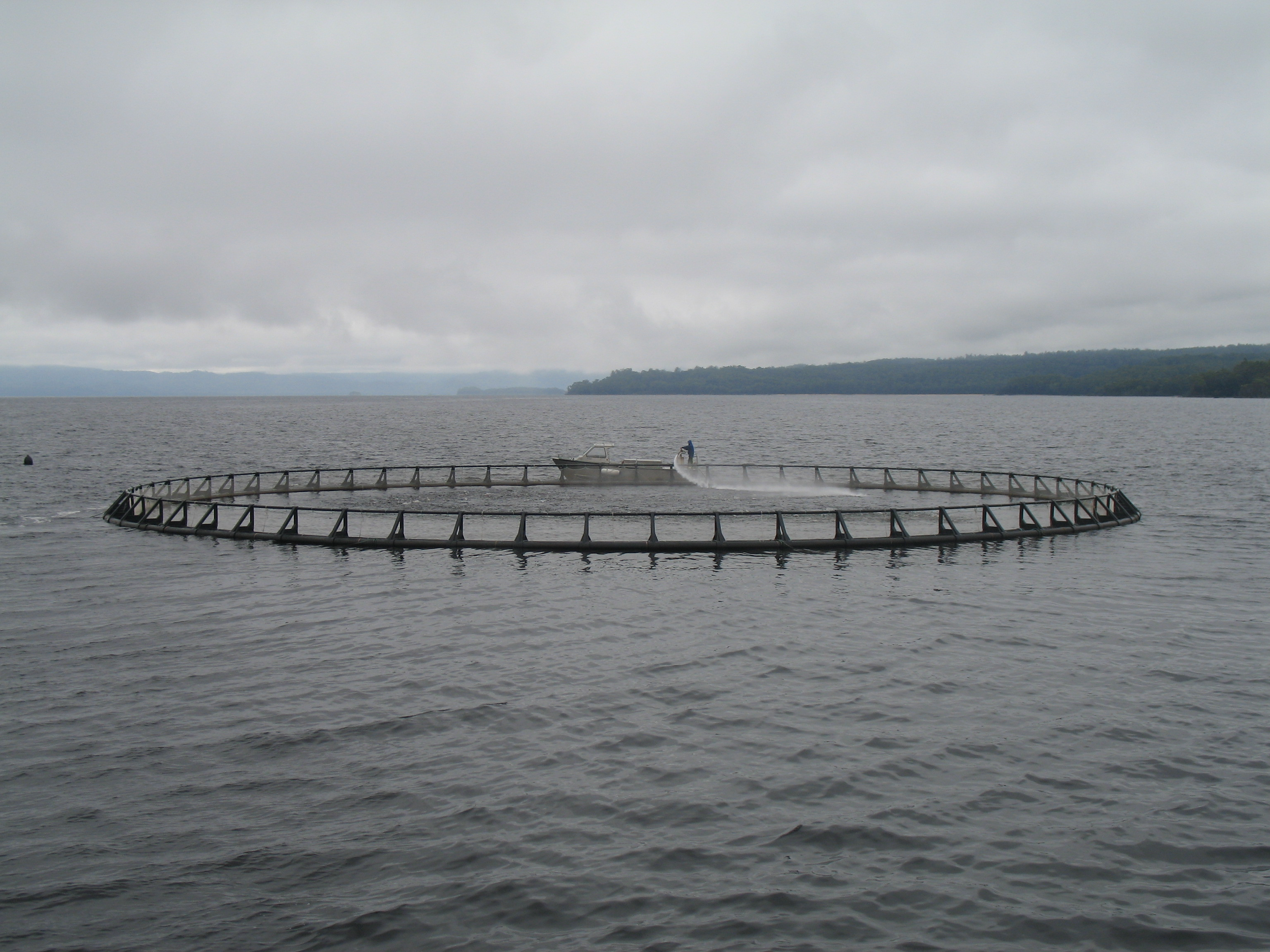
Salmon farm in Macquarie Harbour.

- Birchs Inlet – at the southwestern end of harbour
- Farm Cove – at the southeast side
- Gould Point – adjacent to Farm Cove
- Hallidays Island – on the western shore off of Rum Point
- Hell's Gates – mouth at north west end of harbour
- Kelly Basin – port/town at southern end of harbour – see also Pillinger
- Kelly Channel – at entrance to harbour
- Lettes Bay – between Regatta Point and King River mouth
- Liberty Point – on mid western shore
- Long Bay – south of Regatta Point
- Pillinger – name of abandoned townsite in Kelly Basin
- Pine Cove – just south of the King River Mouth
- Regatta Point – eastern side of Risby Cove
- Risby Cove – water between Strahan Harbour and Regatta Point
- Rum Point – on western shore south of Sarah Island
- Sophia Point – on mid-eastern shore
- Strahan Harbour – from Strahan Point parallel to 'The Esplanade'
- Swan Basin – near Hell's Gates

== Tourism ==
Strahan is the departure point for tourism on Tasmania's west coast. The West Coast Wilderness Railway takes part of the northeastern shore of the harbour, before turning inland at the mouth of the King River. Boats take tourists from Strahan to Hell's Gates and Macquarie Heads, Sarah Island and up the lower reaches of the Gordon River. Charter flights using helicopters and fixed-wing aircraft launch from Strahan Airport.

== Salmon farms ==
Salmon farms were first established in Macquarie Harbour in the 1980s. Production increased significantly in the 21st century. Tassal established farms there in 2003, Huon Aquaculture in 2008 and Petuna around 2011. A range of associated environmental issues in Macquarie Harbour have followed the harbour's industrialisation. Problems include the creation of de-oxygenated "dead zones" beneath pens and massive stock mortalities occurred as stocking and pollution loads increased.

Management practices have been questioned and challenged, after which the EPA reduced the farms' stocking capacities.

The fate of the endangered Maugean skate has been a subject of concern and investigation.

== See also ==
- Convicts on the West Coast of Tasmania
- Convicts in Australia
