= North Mount Lyell railway line =

Former railway company in Tasmania, Australia

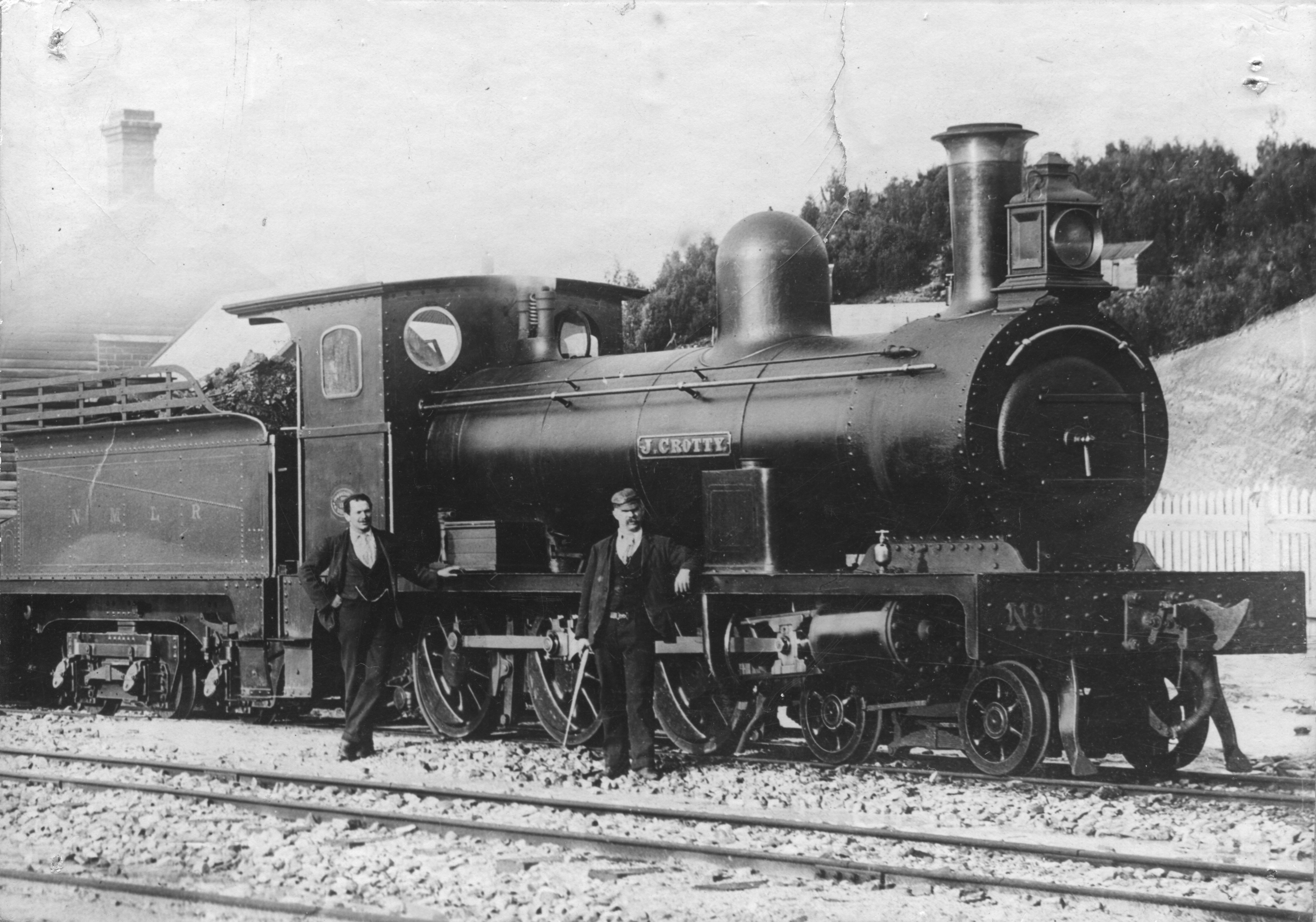
North Mount Lyell Railway Avonside 4-6-0 No. 1 "J. Crotty" at Kelly Basin, circa 1900

The North Mount Lyell Railway was built to operate between the North Mount Lyell mine in West Coast Tasmania and Pillinger in the Kelly Basin of Macquarie Harbour.

== History ==
At the start of the Twentieth century it was constructed to take ore from Gormanston east of the West Coast Range to the Crotty smelters. From there it was shipped out at Kelly Basin.

The North Mount Lyell Railway had exceptionally easy grades compared to its competitor the Mount Lyell Mining and Railway Company which ran its Abt rack system railway through very steep grades from Queenstown to Regatta Point.

=== Design challenge ===
The railway route ran across a belt of karst terrain in the area near the current Darwin Dam – and the engineers of the 1890s were possibly the first in Australia to have designed for the possibility of sinkholes when planning the route.

=== Operation ===
The line was opened for passengers 15 December 1900, and was taken over by the Mount Lyell Mining and Railway Company on 16 July 1903.

In December 1900, when J.F. Anderson was Chief Superintendent, timetabling had:

- Kelly Basin to Linda leaving 8.30 a.m. and 1.45 p.m.
- Linda to Kelly Basin leaving at 11.00 a.m. and 4.15 p.m.

Stopping points were Gormanston junction, King River and Ten Mile.

In August 1901, when J.J. Ware was the traffic manager, timetabling for passengers was restricted to one train a day from each end of the line.

- Linda - departure 10 a.m.
- Kelly Basin - departure 9.20 a.m.

The two trains met at Smelters Junction, with the Linda train leaving at 1.30 p.m. and the Kelly Basin train leaving at 2.45 p.m.

The later years of operation of the line a small rail motor was utilised, similar to that on the Lake Margaret Tram in the last years of operation. Due to failure of the Crotty smelters and the North Mount Lyell operations in general, and the amalgamation of the Mount Lyell and North Mount Lyell mines and companies, the railway had a short operational life. It closed to passengers in July 1924 and closed in 1929.

=== Locomotives ===
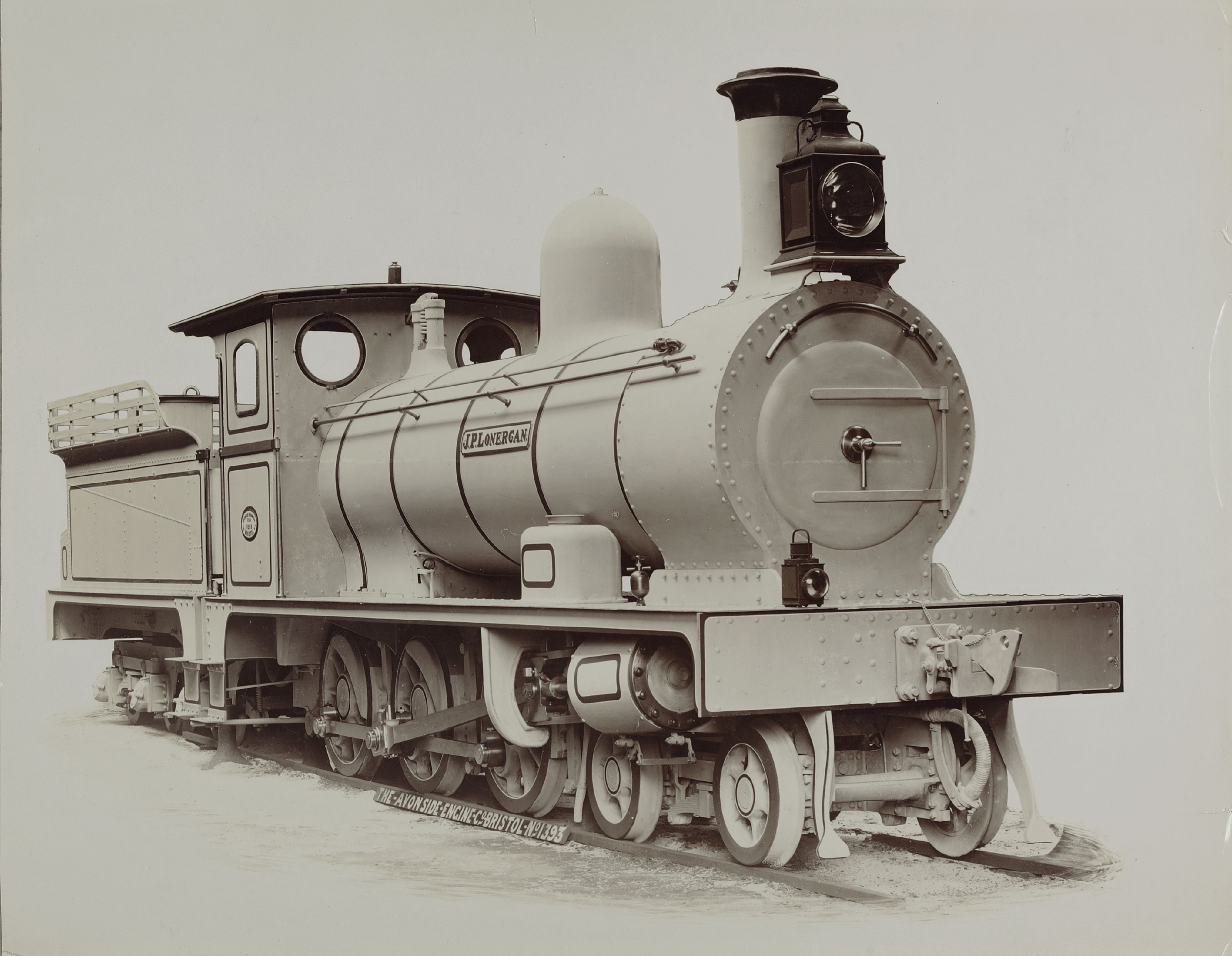
Locomotive No. 2 J.P. Lonergan

The railway utilised three Avonside Engines:

J.Crotty (No.1)(AE 1392/1899),
JP Lonergan (No.2)(AE 1393/1899)
DJ Mackay (No.3)(AE 1394/1899).

It also had three Shay engines:

Number 4 (Lima 698/1902) – 3 cylinder two truck
Number 5 (Lima 697/1902)
Number 6 (Lima 704/1902)

=== Shipping ===
The company also had its own ship (the SS North Lyell) in its service which transported rolling stock to Kelly Basin

=== After closure ===
The railway bridge at the King River and the old rail formation were utilised right up to the damming of the River and the creation of Lake Burbury by the Hydro Electric Commission in the 1980s. The railway formation between the Linda Valley and the old locality of Darwin is now under water.

The railway formation between Mount Owen and Mount Jukes was known as the Kelly Basin Road during the No Dams campaign of December 1982 – and was a location of interaction between members of the Tasmanian Police and protesters.

== Access ==
Considerable parts of the old railway line alignment are now under Lake Burbury or destroyed by the related works.

Kelly Basin Road is accessed from Jukes Highway, at one point on the left (gated and locked) a track to one of the sites related to the Franklin Dam is located. Kelly Basin Road (the old formation) reaches a bridge, where access is by foot is needed to complete the journey to Kelly Basin. Walking time is 3 to 4 hours one way, but an easy grade.

== Stopping Places ==
- Gormanston (branch from Linda 1900–1903 only)
- Linda (also known as North Lyell)
- Crotty — previous name King River until 1902
- Crotty Smelters (siding)
- Darwin
- Ten Mile
- Pillinger (Kelly Basin)

== See also ==
- Railways on the West Coast of Tasmania
