= King River (Tasmania) =

River in Tasmania, Australia

King
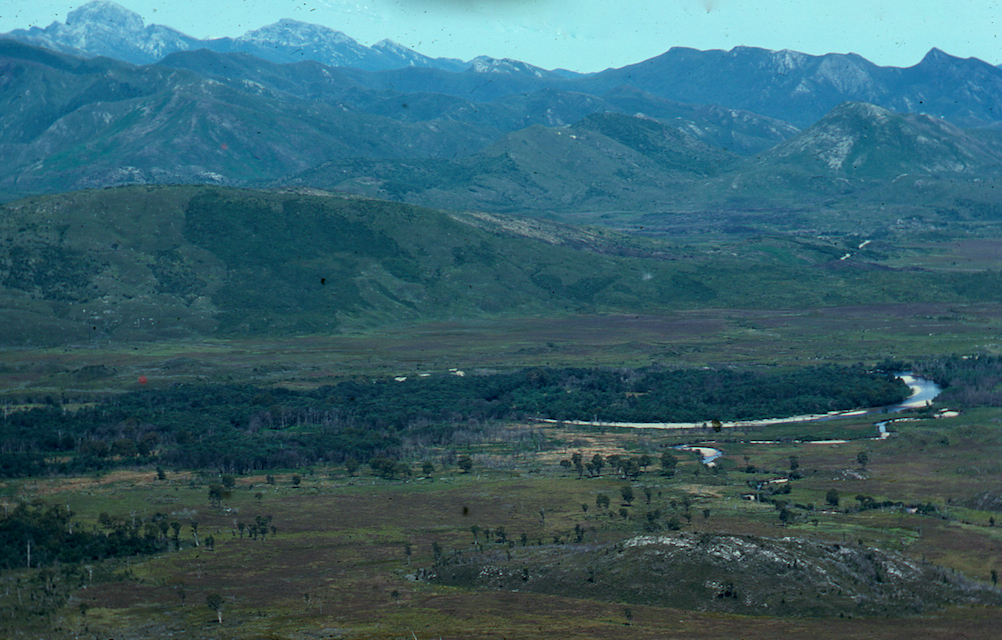
- King River near Mount Huxley in the 1970s prior to damming. Frenchmans Cap is located in upper left corner of the photo.

- Location of the King River mouth in Tasmania
- Etymology: King of Australia

Location
- Country: Australia
- State: Tasmania
- Region: West Coast

Physical characteristics
- Source: Thureau Hills, West Coast Range
- Source confluence: Eldon and South Eldon rivers
  - location: near Eldon Range
  - coordinates: 42°0′46″S 145°41′35″E
  - elevation: 243 m (797 ft)
- Mouth: Lettes Bay, Macquarie Harbour
  - location: near Strahan
  - coordinates: 42°11′35″S 145°21′13″E
  - elevation: 0 m (0 ft)
- Length: 52 km (32 mi)

Basin features
- Tributaries
  - left: Governor River, Nelson River (Tasmania), Princess River
  - right: Tofft River, Queen River, Tasmania
- Reservoir: Lake Burbury

The King River is a major perennial river in the West Coast region of Tasmania, Australia.

== Location and features ==
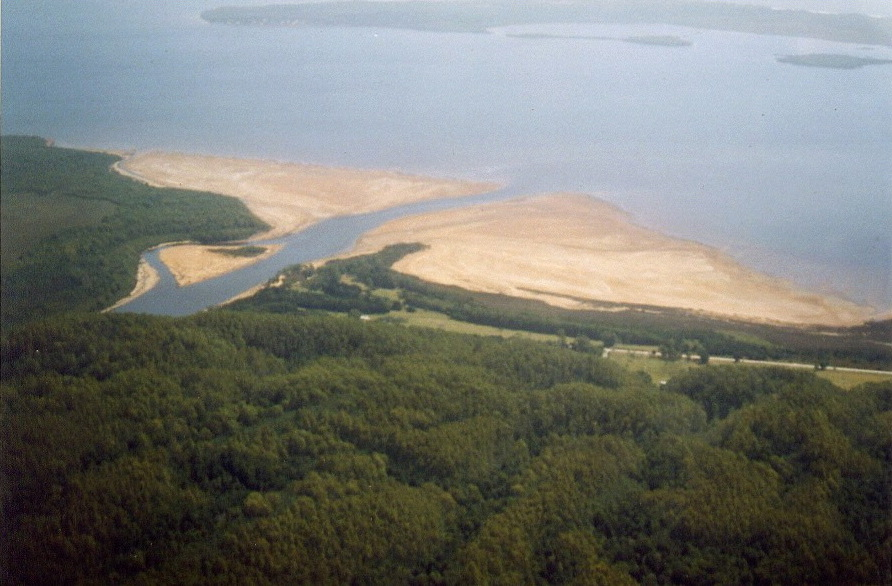
King river at entrance to Macquarie Harbour - the West Coast Wilderness Railway line passes from the right of this picture to enter the King River Valley at the left of photo. Delta of eroded material is typical at this location. Hell's Gates is at top of picture (out of view) and Strahan is to the right off photo. Photo hazy due to bushfires of January 2003.

Formed by the confluence of the Eldon and South Eldon rivers, the King River rises near Eldon Range on the slopes of the West Coast Range between Mount Huxley and Mount Jukes. The river flows generally south and then west, joined by nine tributaries including the Tofft, Governor, Nelson, Princess, and Queen rivers before emptying into Macquarie Harbour near Strahan, and merging with the Southern Ocean. The river descends 24 metres (79 ft) over its 52-kilometre (32 mi) course.

The upper section of the river lies in a glaciated valley, with glacier scouring scars high up on the upper parts of the mountains of the West Coast Range. Also small glacial lakes occur on and north of Mount Sedgwick. Lake Beatrice for instance lies on the eastern slope of Mount Sedgwick. The upper portion of the King River valley was first surveyed for damming in 1917 by the Mount Lyell Mining and Railway Company.

== King River Power Development Scheme ==
The river is impounded by the Crotty Dam to form Lake Burbury, covering 54 square kilometres (21 sq mi) over the former valley and named after the first Australian born Governor of Tasmania, Stanley Burbury. Water drawn from the lake is used to supply the conventional hydroelectric John Butters Power Station, operated by Hydro Tasmania. Below the dam wall, the river flows through a narrow channel as it flows west towards Teepookana, in the last 10 kilometres (6.2 mi) of the river, where extensive silting from the mine tailings that have been carried down from Queenstown, has created such a resource that at least one mining company has in the past proposed the mining of the deposits at the edge of the river, as well as the delta formed out into Macquarie Harbour due to the amount of economically viable materials in the silt.

The small timber mill community adjacent to the old alignment of the Lyell Highway was submerged, as was a significant portion of the old railway alignment of the North Mount Lyell railway line between Linda and Pillinger. The site of the townsite of Crotty, and the smelters of Crotty were also submerged.

=== Queen River ===
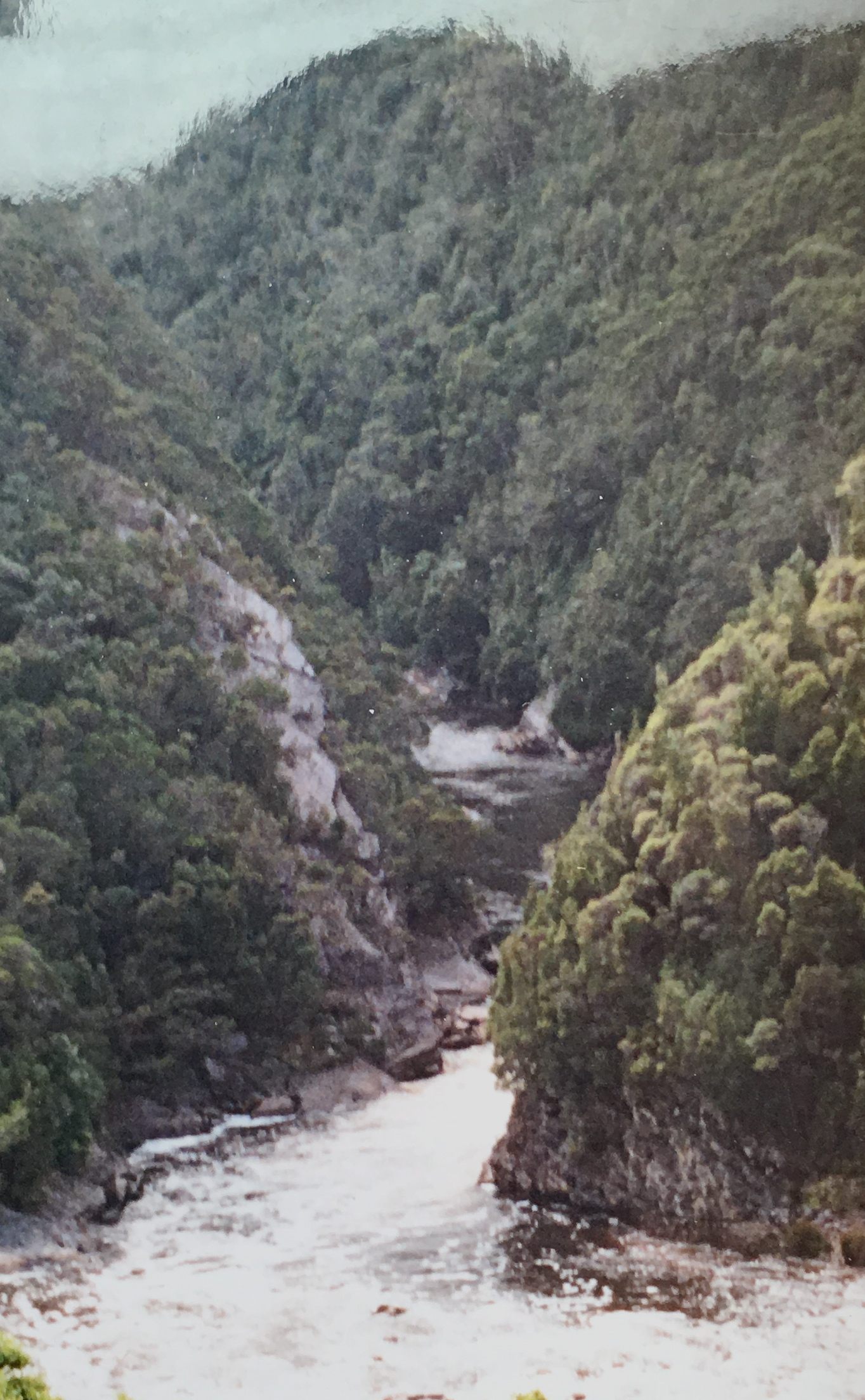
King River gorge lower west end, from Abt Railway looking east

The King River was considered to be Australia's most polluted river. Mining started in the 1880s, with the Queen River, a major tributary of the King River, being used for waste water disposal from the Mt Lyell copper mine.

Between 1922 and 1995 low grade ore was concentrated on site and the tailings (ore-washing residue) dumped in the river also.

About 1.5 million tonnes of sulfidic tailings entered the river system each year up to 1995, along with huge volumes of acidic, metal-rich water flowing from the workings. This 'acid mine drainage' is derived from water leaching through the exposed and oxidised sulfide rocks. When it was in operation, the fumes from the ore smelter produced acid rain which also leached minerals from the bare Queenstown hills.

In 1992 the King River was dammed above the confluence with the Queen River to generate hydroelectric power at the Crotty Dam. This changed the flow regime in the King River, and affected the way tailings were transported through the river system. The tailings in the river greatly affect the water quality.

About 100 million tonnes of tailings have been deposited on the banks and bed of the King River and in a delta at the mouth of the river where it enters Macquarie Harbour.

Since the closure of the mine in late 1995, and the construction of a tailings dam by the new operators, tailings no longer enter the river system. However, acid water continues to enter the river due to mine dewatering and run-off from the waste rock dumps. Without the buffering previously provided by the alkaline tailings, the acidity in the Queen and King rivers has increased, and dissolved metal concentrations have greatly increased-to levels highly toxic to aquatic life.

=== Abt Railway route ===
The north bank (except for the Teepookana to Quarter Mile Bridge section which was on the south bank) of the lower portion of the King River valley was the route for the old "Abt" rack railway to Queenstown. In 1962 the original builder and owner, the Mount Lyell railway line closed and the line was removed. This has been since restored in early 2002 for tourism purposes. The new line follows exactly the same route and is known as the West Coast Wilderness Railway.

== See also ==
- Rivers of Tasmania
