= Pillinger, Tasmania =

Former port and townsite in Tasmania, Australia

Pillinger
- Click on the map for a fullscreen view

Location
- Country: Australia
- Location: Tasmania
- Coordinates: 42°21′S 145°34′E

Pillinger is an abandoned port and townsite in Kelly Basin, on the south eastern side of Macquarie Harbour on the West Coast of Tasmania.

It was constructed for James Crotty's North Mount Lyell mining company to ship ore from the North Mount Lyell mine, utilising the North Mount Lyell Railway that took the ore to the smelters at Crotty and on to Pillinger. East Pillinger was a company town, and West Pillinger was the neighbouring government town. East Pillinger had 3 wharves, a sawmill, brickworks and ore crusher. West Pillinger had stores, hotels and a police station.

Kelly's Basin Post Office opened on 15 July 1898, was renamed Pillinger in 1899 and closed in 1924.

Pillinger was the name of an old Tasmanian family, some of whom were politicians.

When the Mount Lyell Mining and Railway Company took over the North Mount Lyell operations, most of the town and port facilities were either removed and utilised elsewhere, or left to rot. As a result, a number of ruins and relics in various grades of condition can be found on the former Pillinger site, including two brick kilns, three boiler engines, and part of a train carriage. In addition, the decaying remains of the rail line are still in place, running for several hundred metres out into Macquarie Harbour itself.

The Tasmanian government have graded the town and its vicinity as a historical area.
