= Mount Lyell Mining and Railway Company =

Former mining and railway company of Queenstown, Tasmania

Mount Lyell Mining and Railway Company was a Tasmanian mining company formed on 29 March 1893, most commonly referred to as Mount Lyell. Mount Lyell was the dominant copper mining company of the West Coast from 1893 to 1994, and was based in Queenstown, Tasmania.

Following consolidation of leases and company assets at the beginning of the twentieth century, Mount Lyell was the major company for the communities of Queenstown, Strahan and Gormanston. It remained dominant until its closure in 1994.

The Mount Lyell mining operations produced more than a million tonnes of copper, 750 tonnes of silver and 45 tonnes of gold since mining commenced in the early 1890s – which is equivalent to over 4 billion dollars' worth of metal in 1995 terms.

== History ==
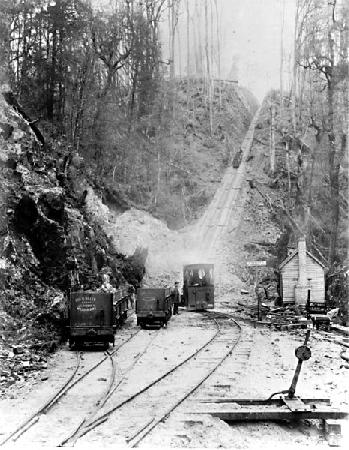
Self acting haulage of Mount Lyell 2ft tramway in Tasmania

In the early stage of operations, Mount Lyell was surrounded by smaller competing leases and companies. Eventually they were all absorbed into Mount Lyell operations, or were closed down. In 1903 the North Mount Lyell Copper Company was taken over, and in 1912 the most severe calamity to visit the Mount Lyell company was the 1912 North Mount Lyell Disaster, also known at the time as the North Lyell fire.

During its history, Mount Lyell had exploration leases surrounding its main mining area, and had at one time or other explored most of the West Coast Range revisiting many of the smaller mines that had been worked on in the early 1900s. As a consequence the Mount Lyell company had utilised considerable resources on maintaining leases over areas of promising geology – as well as checking older mining locations on the west coast. At various stages it also shared costs and resources with other companies which would assist by investing in exploration by becoming partners in some leases.

The operations were conducted in various parts of the Mount Lyell Lease, and in the mid-1970s, prior to reduction in the workforce, "Cape Horn" was located just west of the "Comstock" operation which was on the north side of Mount Lyell, while most of the North Mount Lyell workings were finished, "12 West" was still in operation due to its rich copper ores. "West Lyell open cut" which had been dominant in the 1950s was finished, and various parts of the lease were disappearing into the opening above the "Prince Lyell" workings.

Following the first large layoffs in the mid-1970s, the town of Queenstown lost its dominance on the west coast by the mid-1990s, and being mainly a company town many services closed by the 2000s, and the separate west Tasmanian local government authorities were amalgamated into the West Coast Council.

Beyond copper mining, the company operated chemical works producing sulphuric acid and superphosphate. In Victoria it established works at Yarraville by 1905, and in Western Australia it operated the Mount Lyell Chemical Works at North Fremantle (Rocky Bay). In 1927 Mount Lyell joined Cuming, Smith & Co. and Westralian Farmers Superphosphates to form Cuming Smith & Mount Lyell Farmers Fertilisers, each holding a one-third share; Mount Lyell’s interest was sold in 1963–64 and the business was renamed CSBP. Separately, in 1929 Mount Lyell’s Yarraville works were amalgamated with those of Cuming, Smith & Company and Wischer & Company to form Commonwealth Fertilisers and Chemicals, later absorbed into Imperial Chemical Industries Australia & New Zealand.

=== Centenary ===
On 29 March 1993 the company celebrated its centenary. At that stage it was known as the Copper Division of Renison Goldfields Consolidated Limited. The Mount Lyell Mining Field, and the various activities of the company in Queenstown and the west coast of Tasmania were celebrated throughout the community.

=== People associated with the company ===
Among the many individuals associated with the company during its long history were John Earle, Edward Braddon, Colin Syme, John Henry, Robert Sticht, and Bowes Kelly.

=== Current ===
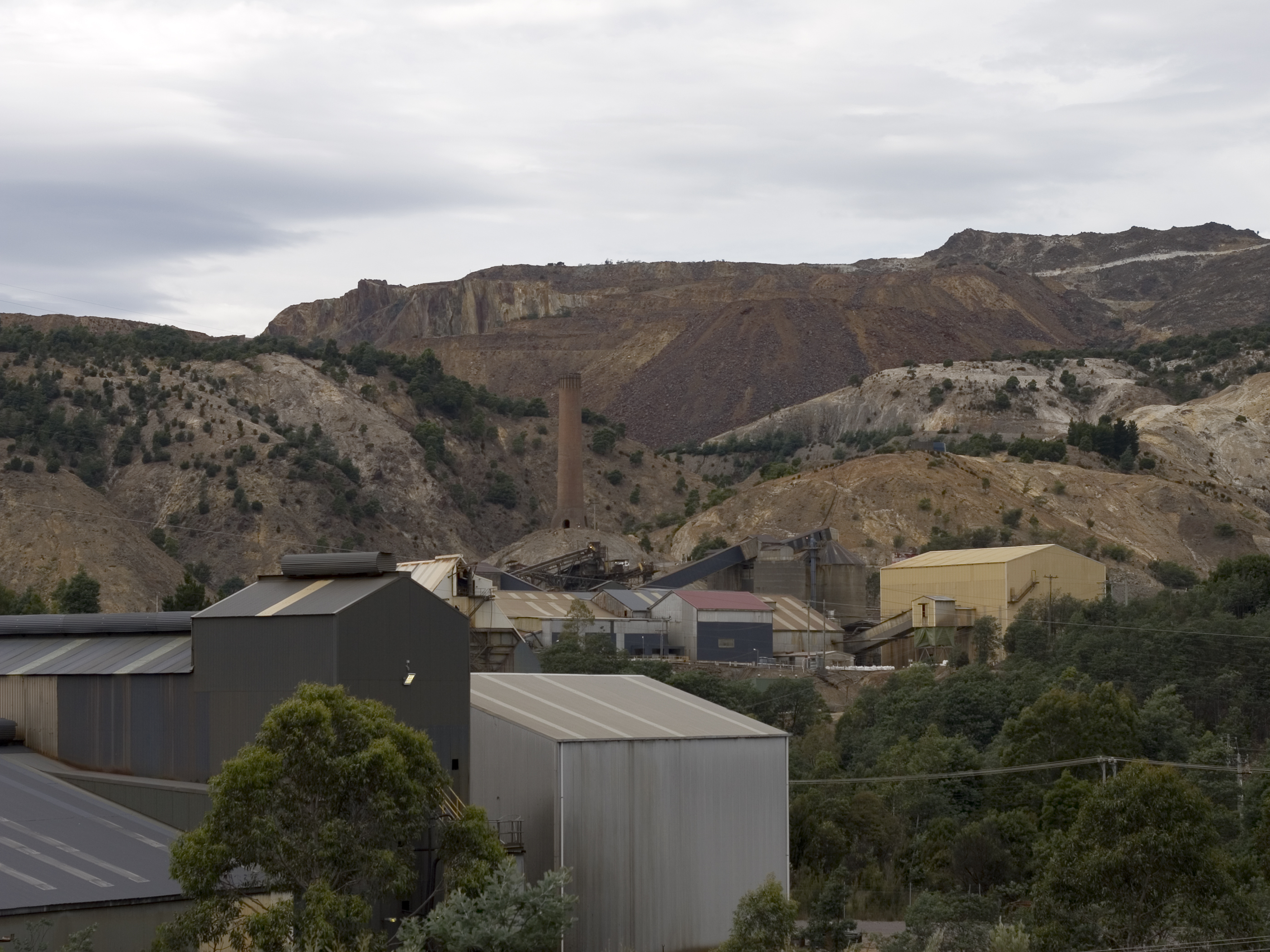
Mount Lyell mine in 2014

The Mount Lyell Remediation and Research and Demonstration Program was conducted between 1994 and 1996 following the closing of the company, to reverse the ecological change upon the Queen and King Rivers, and Macquarie Harbour; caused by the release of mine waste and effluent into the rivers. It is estimated that 100 million tonnes of tailings were disposed of into the Queen River.

The Mount Lyell lease and mine was reopened by Copper Mines of Tasmania in 1995. This company in turn was acquired by Sterlite Industries, an Indian-based company, in 1999. As a consequence it is part of the Vedanta group of companies. Its concentrate material is shipped to India for processing. Government guidelines saw tailings dams created and special measures taken to prevent any further pollution of the rivers and harbour.

Mining was suspended at Mount Lyell due to accidents in the 2010s and remains in mothball situation in the late 2010s.

== Mine operation ==
The following locations were within the operating mine lease and indicate a separate orebody and operating life:

- Iron Blow (1883–1929)
- North Lyell (1896–1972)
- Royal Tharsis (1902–1991)
- Lyell Comstock (1913–1959)
- Crown Lyell (1931–1985)
- West Lyell Open Cut (1934–1978)
- Cape Horn (1969–1987)
- Prince Lyell Mine (1969–1995)

== Railway ==
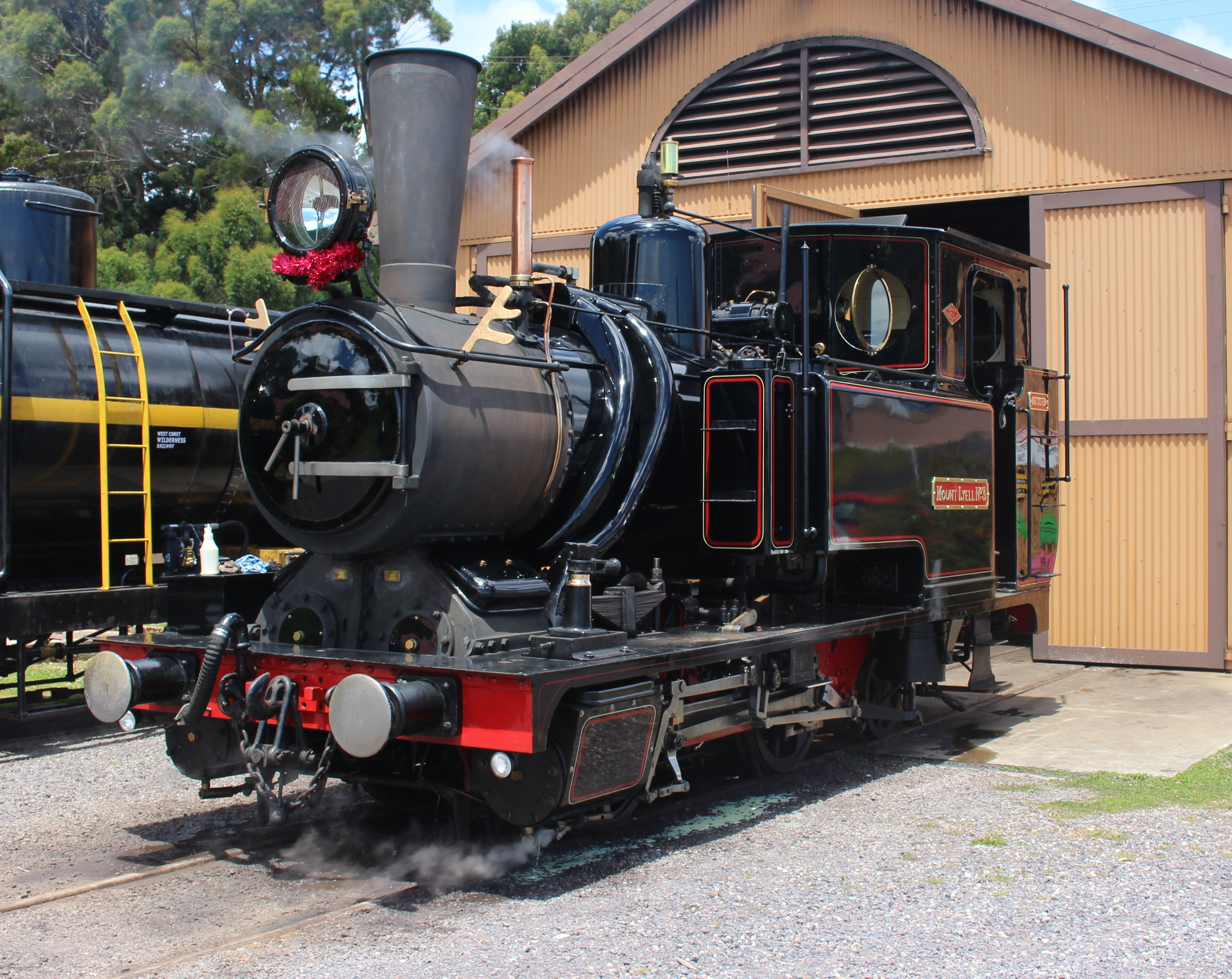
Mount Lyell No. 3 was one of the original steam Abt locomotives on the line

See Mount Lyell railway line and West Coast Wilderness Railway for more details.

Mount Lyell was also the operator of the 3 ft 6 in (1,067 mm) gauge Queenstown to Regatta Point railway from 1899 to 1963, which used the Abt rack system of cog railway for steep sections. In 1963 most of the railway was removed, leaving only a few items untouched.

The railway was totally rebuilt over the railway formation and recommenced operation in 2002 as the Abt Wilderness Railway, and was known as the West Coast Wilderness Railway and operated by Federal Hotels until 2013.

== Archives ==
The company has been significant in Australian business history works as Geoffrey Blainey, the Australian historian, began his career with the writing of the company history The Peaks of Lyell, which has now progressed to its sixth edition.

Also, due to circumstances at the winding up of Mount Lyell significant amounts of company records were deposited with Tasmanian state archives.

== Environmental impact ==
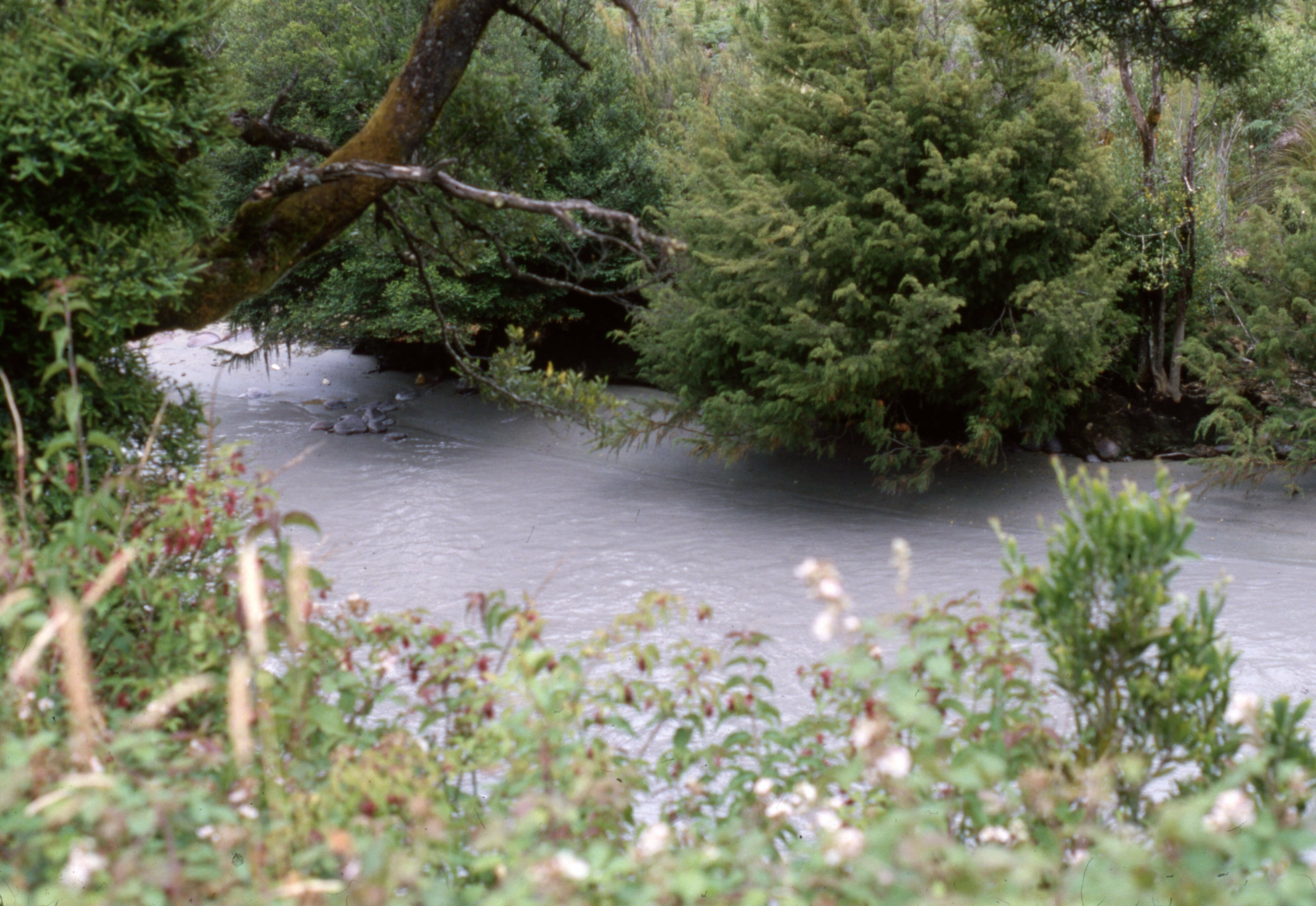
1970s Queen River with mine waste uncontrolled

Pollution of the Queen and King Rivers, and Macquarie Harbour was caused by the release of mine waste and effluent into the rivers. It is estimated that 100 million tonnes of tailings were disposed of into the Queen River. The environmental impacts included:

- tailings, slag and acid drainage into rivers and a delta of tailings the size of a city suburb in Macquarie Harbour;
- all aquatic life in the Queen River and lower King River has been killed;
- waterways contaminated with toxic metals, particularly copper, representing a potential hazard to the fishing industry and other harbour uses;
- vegetation on Queenstown hills destroyed by felling, fire, erosion and toxic fumes from smelting.

Smelting ended in the 1960s and CMT built a dam to contain tailings.

Research by the Supervising Scientist published in 1997 overwhelmingly identified the lease site as the major source of acid drainage-related pollutants affecting the rivers and harbour, with metals contamination from tailing and slag deposits being very minor in comparison.

Within the lease site, the North Lyell Tunnel had water derived in part from underground workings and has approximately 78% of the lease site copper loading. Discharge from other tunnels and waste rock dumps accounts for 21%. The remaining 1% is from smaller sources.

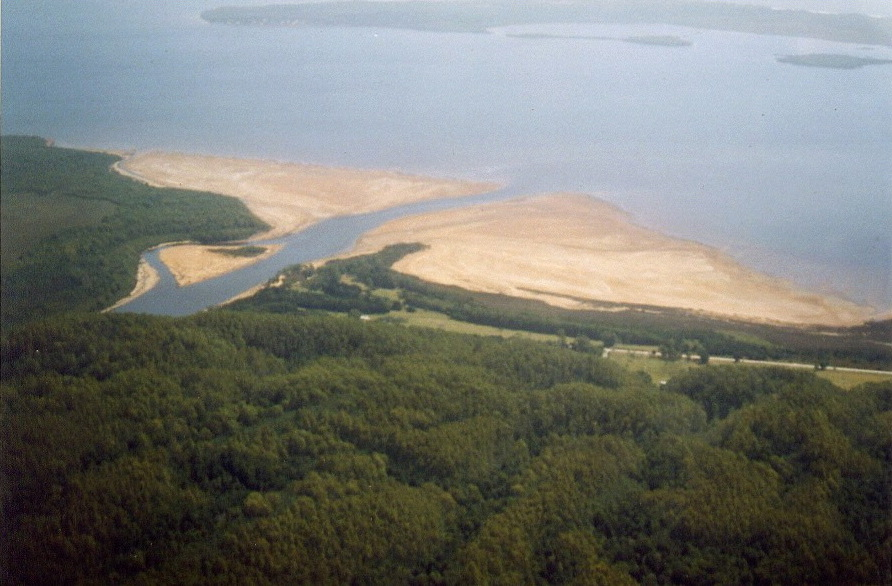
sedimentary delta at the mouth of King River in the 2000s

Downstream, chemical modelling and toxicological testing indicates that 95% to 99% of the acid drainage from the site must be neutralised or stemmed for the resultant water quality to meet downstream environmental quality objectives. Contaminated sediments in the King River and Macquarie Harbour contribute relatively little of the total pollutant load entering the harbour.

== See also ==
- CSBP, a fertiliser company that Mount Lyell co-owned from 1927 to 1963
- Railways on the West Coast of Tasmania
- West Coast Tasmania Mines
- Cuming, Smith & Co.
- Commonwealth Fertilisers and Chemicals
- Vedanta Resources
