= Mountain ranges of Australia =

This is a list of mountain ranges, including ranges of hills, that occur in Australia.

== Australian Capital Territory ==
Australian Alps
Brindabella Range
Great Dividing Range

== New South Wales ==
Allyn Range
Australian Alps
Barrier Ranges
Brindabella Range
Blue Mountains
Budawang Range
Gibraltar Range
Great Dividing Range
Herveys Range
Illawarra escarpment
Koonyum Range
Liverpool Range
McPherson Range
Moonbi Range
Mount Royal Range
Nandewar Range
Nightcap Range
Ramshead Range
Snowy Mountains
Tweed Range
Warrumbungles
Watagan Mountains

== Northern Territory ==
Bloods Range
Hann Range
Kelly Hills
MacDonnell Ranges
Mann Ranges
Mitchell Ranges
Musgrave Ranges
Olia Chain
Petermann Ranges
Wellington Range

== Queensland ==
Bellenden Ker Range
Berserker Range
Blackall Range
Brisbane Range
Bunya Mountains
Carnarvon Range
Clarke Range
Conondale Range
D'Aguilar Range
Darlington Range
Expedition Range
Gillies Range
Great Dividing Range
Gregory Range
Grey Range
Hervey Range
Leichhardt Range
Little Liverpool Range
McIlwraith Range
Main Range National Park
McPherson Range
Nimmel Range
Seaview Range
Selwyn Range
Steamer Range
Taylor Range
Teviot Range

== South Australia ==
Adelaide Hills
Barossa Range
Barunga Range
Belvidere Range
Birksgate Range
Ediacara Hills
Flinders Ranges
Gammon Ranges
Gawler Ranges
Hummock Range
Indulkana Range
Mann Ranges
Middleback Range
Mount Lofty Ranges
Musgrave Ranges
Narien Range
Skilly Hills
Stuart Range
Tomkinson Ranges

== Tasmania ==
Arthur Range
Dial Range
Du Cane Range
Eldon Range
Engineer Range
Frankland Range
King William Range
Pelion Range
Prince of Wales Range
Raglan Range
The Spires
Sticht Range
Tyndall Range
Wellington Range
West Coast Range

== Victoria ==
Australian Alps
Cathedral Range
Central Highlands
Cobberas Range
Dandenong Ranges
Great Dividing Range
Pyrenees Ranges
Ramshead Range
Strathbogie Ranges
Strzelecki Ranges
Victorian Alps

== Western Australia ==
Carnarvon Range(s)
Chichester Range
Darling Scarp
Hamersley Range
Musgrave Ranges
Napier Range
Ophthalmia Range
Oscar Range
Petermann Ranges
Porongurup Range
Rawlinson Ranges
Robinson Ranges
Stirling Range
Whicher Range
Wunaamin Miliwundi Ranges

== See also ==
- List of mountain ranges
