= Mount Geikie (Tasmania) =

Mountain in Tasmania, Australia

- Location within Tasmania

Highest point
- Elevation: 1,191 m (3,907 ft)
- Coordinates: 41°58′12″S 145°34′12″E

Geography
- Location: Western Tasmania, Australia
- Parent range: West Coast Range

Mount Geikie is a mountain in the West Coast Range of Western Tasmania, Australia.

Mount Geikie has an elevation of 1,191 metres (3,907 ft) above sea level.

== Location and features ==
Mount Geikie sits just north of Lake Margaret, and is just west of the smaller tributary lakes of Lake Margaret – Lake Mary, Lake Martha, and Lake Magdala. The east face of Mount Geikie area has two named features that lie to the north and south. The Chin at 1,116 metres (3,661 ft) lies to the south, and is the point where the West Coast Range dips to the glacial features known as the Hamilton moraine. The Bastion at 1,107 metres (3,632 ft) is part of a glaciated wall that extends north.

The surrounding high ground to the north of Mount Geikie is often known as 'The Tyndalls' or confused with Mount Tyndall. The area is at the northern end of a block of mountains that are north of Mount Sedgwick which sits above the first large glacial valley between Mount Sedgwick and Mount Lyell. The 'Tyndalls' have a number of glacial lakes, and lies south east of the Henty Gold-Mine, and Hydro Tasmania dam on the Henty River – and south of Lake Mackintosh, Lake Murchison and Tullah.

== See also ==
- List of highest mountains of Tasmania

== Bibliography ==
- Blainey, Geoffrey (2000). The Peaks of Lyell (6th ed.). Hobart: St. David's Park Publishing. ISBN 0-7246-2265-9.
- Whitham, Charles. Western Tasmania: A Land of Riches and Beauty.
