= Tyndall Range =

Mountains in Western Tasmania, Australia

- The Tyndalls
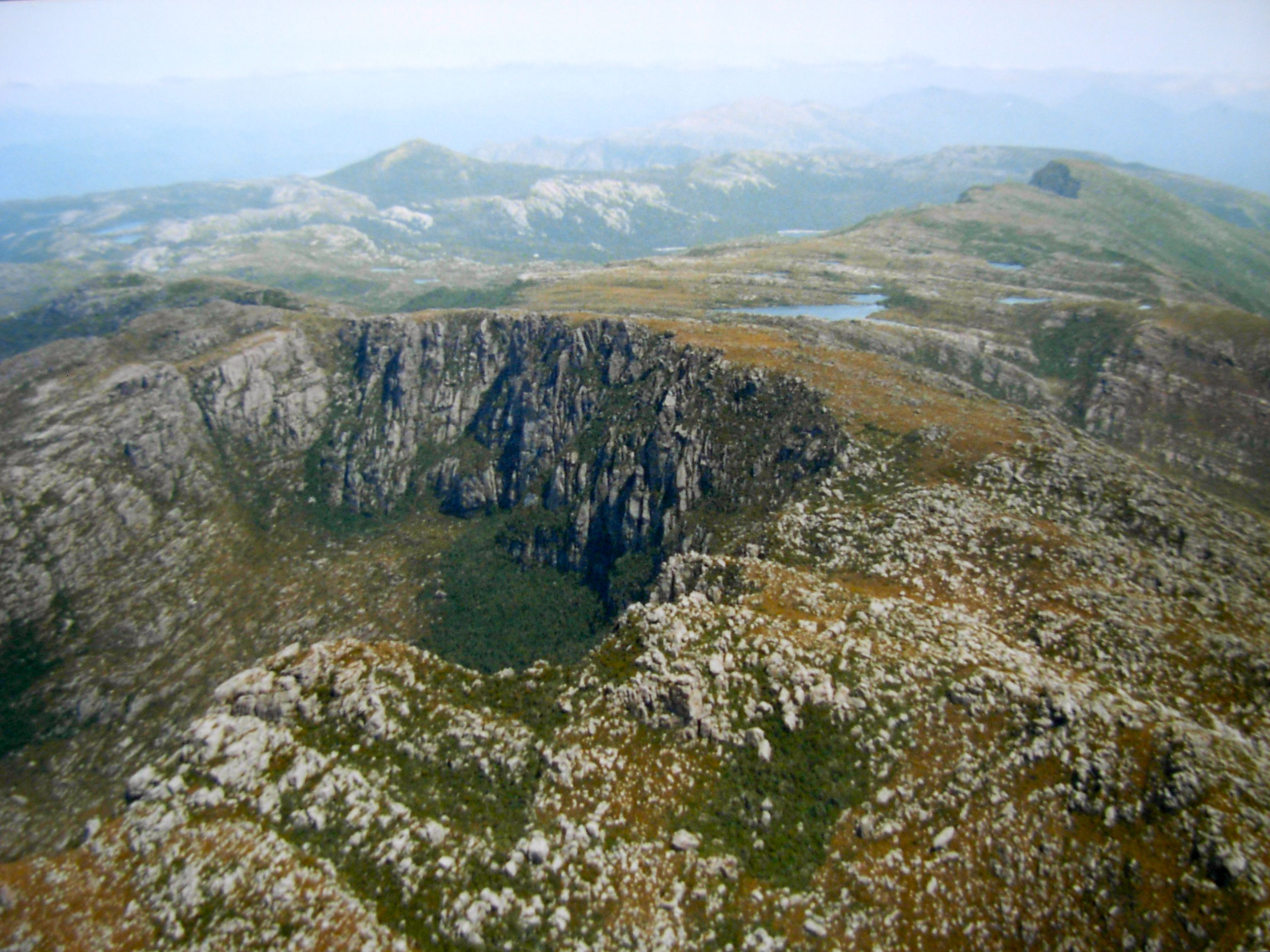
- Aerial photograph of Tyndalls area

Highest point
- Peak: Mount Tyndall
- Elevation: 1,179 m (3,868 ft); AHD
- Coordinates: 41°55′48″S 145°35′24″E

Geography
- Location within Tasmania
- Country: Australia
- State: Tasmania
- Region: Western Tasmania
- Range coordinates: 41°56′24″S 145°35′24″E
- Parent range: West Coast Range

Geology
- Rock age: Jurassic
- Rock type: Dolerite

The Tyndall Range, commonly called The Tyndalls, is a mountain range that is part of the West Coast Range in the Western region of Tasmania, Australia.

The main focal point for the range is Mount Tyndall which lies at the northern part of the range. The whole range western slopes can be viewed from the Anthony Road, while the plateau like formation of The Tyndalls is a road free area requiring viewing either from the air, or by foot.

Within the range lies the Tyndall Regional Reserve, a nature reserve that is the western buffer zone for the Cradle Mountain-Lake St Clair National Park World Heritage Area. The area is north of Mount Sedgwick.

The Tyndalls were named in 1877 by James Reid Scott on the suggestion of Thomas Bather Moore in honour of Professor John Tyndall, a Fellow of the Geological Society who made important contributions in physics, atmospheric science and geology.

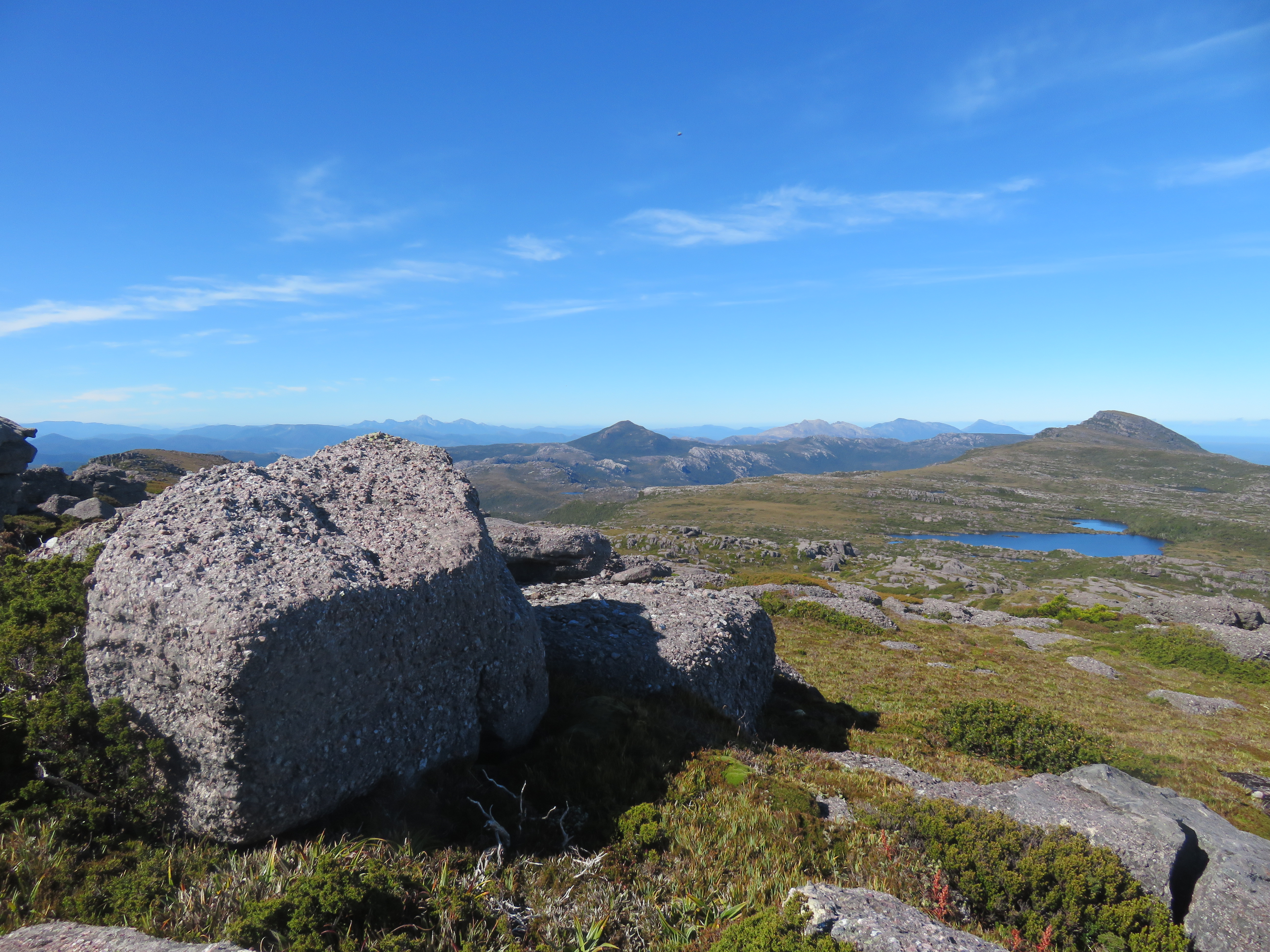
View looking south from the Mount Tyndall in Western Tasmania

== Features ==
The Tyndall Range have a number of glacial lakes, the larger being Lake Huntley, Lake Rolleston, Lake Tyndall and Lake Matthew. The signs of the glaciation were first described by Thomas Bather Moore in 1894.

The Tyndalls were explored for minerals in the early twentieth century, but no significant working mine ever eventuated.

The Tyndalls lie south east of the Henty Gold Mine, and Hydro Tasmania dam on the upper Henty River and south of Lake Mackintosh, Lake Murchison and Tullah. They are west of the Sticht Range.

In the 2020s proposals for a walking trail in the range were put forward, despite the relative high incidence of extreme weather conditions compared to other locations. The average extreme weather of the area historically has been recorded at Lake Margaret lying at the south of the range and Mount Reid being at the north west of the range.

== See also ==
- List of highest mountains of Tasmania

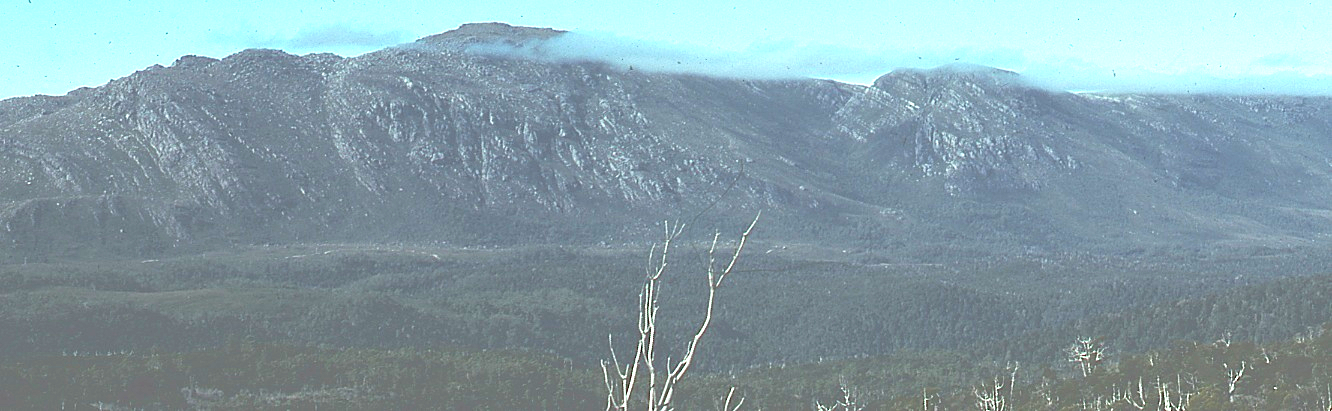
Western side of the Tyndalls in the 1970s
