= Raglan Range =

Mountain range in Tasmania, Australia

Coordinates: 42°10′S 145°50′E

The Raglan Range is located in Western Tasmania, east of the West Coast Range.

It is located on the northern side of the Franklin River, and to the south of the Lyell Highway.

Earlier European explorers burnt this range as early as 1859.

It is located in the Franklin-Gordon Wild Rivers National Park.
