= Anthony Road =

Road in Tasmania, Australia

Anthony Road Tasmania

General information
- Type: Rural road
- Length: 38.5 km (24 mi)
- Route number(s): B28

Major junctions
- North end: Murchison Highway (A10), Tullah
- South end: Zeehan Highway (A10), Queenstown

Location(s)
- Major settlements: West Coast Range

The Anthony Road (Route B28) is a major B Route in Western Tasmania, running from the Murchison Highway (A10) at Tullah to the Zeehan Highway (A10) north of Queenstown.

Along with the Lyell Highway, Anthony Road is one of only two roads that run within or cross the West Coast Range.

The name is derived from the Anthony River which is located in the West Coast Range.

It is commonly used as a bypass of Rosebery for people travelling south to Queenstown and beyond or for people travelling north to Tullah and beyond.

The Anthony Road is the only road from which all major peaks of the Cradle Mountain-Lake St Clair reserve can be seen. It provides access to several classic walks: Mt Murchison, the Dora Plateau and the Tyndall Range.

It runs close to natural and man made lakes in the upper reaches of the Murchison River catchment of the Pieman River power scheme. Lakes include Lake Plimsoll, Lake Selina, and Lake Westwood. It also goes close to the base of Mount Murchison.

It is also an access road for the Henty Gold Mine.

It runs parallel to the Henty River for the last 10 kilometres before the Zeehan Highway.

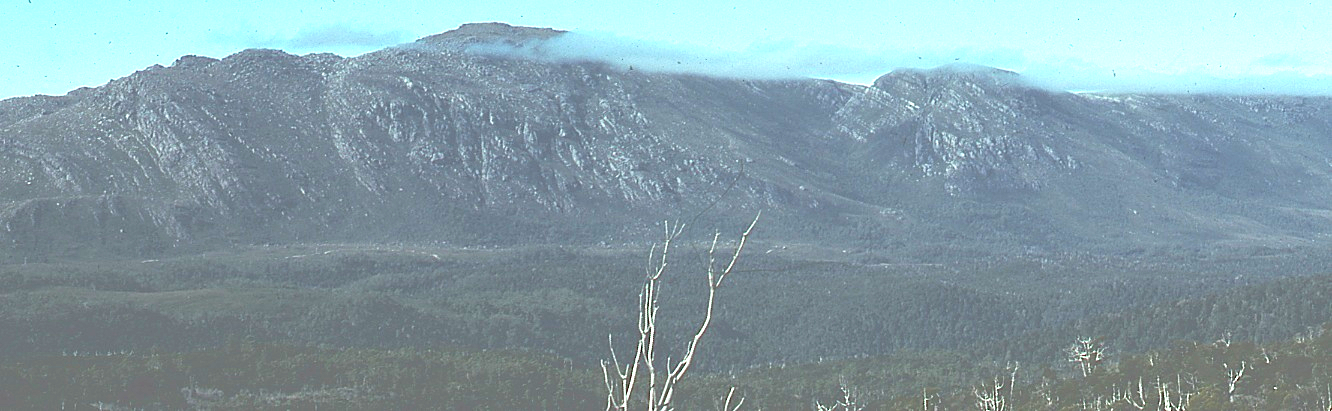
Western side of the Tyndalls in the 1970s, taken before the road was constructed - the Anthony Road is at the lower slope of the range

== See also ==
- List of highways in Tasmania
