= Henty Dam =

Dam in West Coast, Tasmania, Australia

- Location of the dam in Tasmania
- Interactive map of Henty Dam
- Country: Australia
- Location: West Coast, Tasmania
- Coordinates: 41°52′49″S 145°32′57″E
- Purpose: Power
- Status: Operational
- Opening date: 1988
- Operator: Hydro Tasmania

Dam and spillways
- Type of dam: Gravity dam
- Impounds: Henty River
- Height: 20 m (66 ft)
- Length: 120 m (390 ft)
- Dam volume: 12×10^{3} m^{3} (420×10^{3} cu ft)
- Spillway type: Uncontrolled
- Spillway capacity: 139 m^{3}/s (4,900 cu ft/s)

Reservoir
- Creates: Lake Henty
- Total capacity: 350 ML (280 acre⋅ft)
- Catchment area: 18 km^{2} (6.9 sq mi)
- Surface area: 7 ha (17 acres)
- Normal elevation: 518 m (1,699 ft) AHD

The Henty Dam is a small gravity dam across the Henty River, located in the West Coast region of Tasmania, Australia. The dam was completed in 1988 and the resultant reservoir, Lake Henty, established for the purpose of generating hydroelectricity as part of the proposed Anthony Power Development, that did not proceed in full, as planned.

== Overview ==
Completed in 1988 by the Hydro Electric Corporation (TAS), the concrete dam wall is 20 metres (66 ft) high and 120 metres (390 ft) long. When full, the reservoir has capacity of 350 megalitres (280 acre⋅ft) and covers 7 hectares (17 acres), drawn from a catchment area of 18 square kilometres (6.9 sq mi). The uncontrolled spillway has a flow capacity of 139 cubic metres per second (4,900 cu ft/s).

The dam diverts water to Lake Plimsoll and, consequently, to the Tribute Power Station.

== See also ==
- List of reservoirs and dams in Tasmania
- Henty Gold Mine
