= Yolande River =

River in Tasmania, Australia

- Location of the river in Tasmania

Location
- Country: Australia
- State: Tasmania

Physical characteristics
- Source
  - location: West Coast Range, Western Tasmania
  - elevation: 662 m (2,172 ft) AHD
- Mouth: Henty River
  - location: West of Queenstown
  - coordinates: 42°02′26″S 145°26′50″E
  - elevation: 50.6 m (166 ft) AHD

Basin features
- River system: Henty River
- Waterbodies: Lake Margaret Dam
- Waterfalls: Yolande River Falls
- Bridges: Zeehan Highway Bridge

Yolande River is a perennial river that originates in the West Coast Range, Western Tasmania. It drains Lake Margaret and is utilised by the Lake Margaret Power Station. The river serves, as a tributary to the Henty River, located west of Queenstown, the flows into the Southern Ocean.

== See also ==
- List of rivers of Australia § Tasmania
