= Lake Margaret Tram =

Former tramway in Western Tasmania, Australia

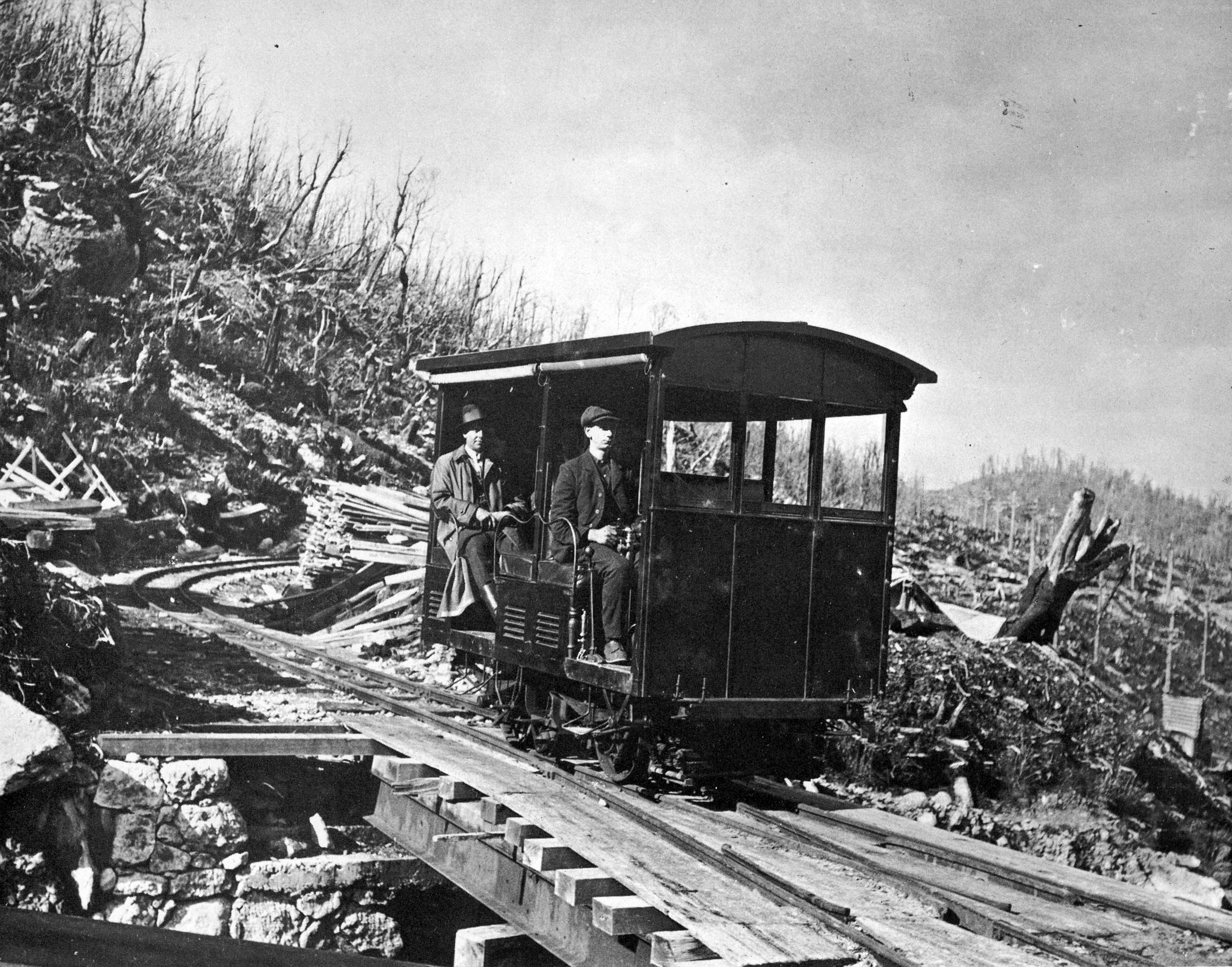
Riley railmotor arriving at Lake Margaret, circa 1920

The Lake Margaret Tram was located on the western side of Mount Sedgwick in the West Coast Range on the West Coast of Tasmania in service for the Mount Lyell Mining and Railway Company to the Lake Margaret community.

== Construction ==
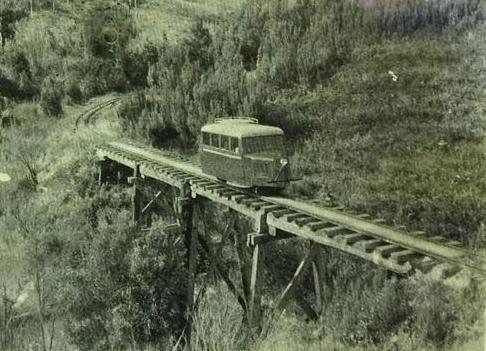
Vauxhall railbus on the threstle bridge, 1963

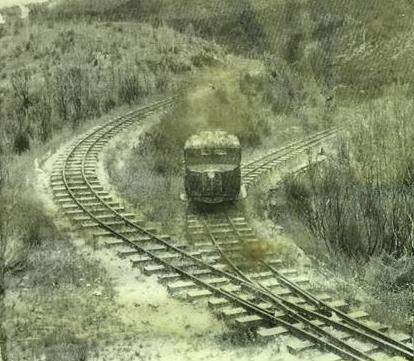
Vauxhall railbus at the zig zag, 1963

By 1903, the timber areas having been cut out around Queenstown itself, the wood cutters moved to Howard's Plains situated on the plateau north west of Queenstown. As access onto the plateau was steep, a self-acting 2 ft (610 mm) narrow gauge dual haulage was built. From the top of the incline, a tramway was laid and was extended, over a period of time, some 4¼ miles towards Lake Margaret.

Following the decision to build the Lake Margaret Power Station, the Howard's Plains Tram was extended from its then terminus at the 4¼ mile peg. Work commenced on the extension on 19 August 1912. The Howard's Plains tram was completely upgraded. The total distance from the haulage to the power station being 7 miles, including a zig zag along the line.

Following the completion of the power station on 28 November 1914, the tram continued to provide firewood as well as a freight and passenger service for employees and their families living at the isolated settlement. A second power station was built a mile below the first station, in 1931, and was also linked by tramway.

== Length Reduced ==
In 1937, the terminus of the line was moved from the top of the haulage to its junction with the Queenstown to Strahan road. The haulage was no longer required after the road’s construction. Upon completion of the road to Zeehan in 1941, the terminus was moved again, to join with road approximately 3 miles from Queenstown.

== Closure ==
The Lake Margaret Tram remained the only connection to the Lake Margaret locality for a considerable part of the twentieth century. It was closed in 1964 when a road was constructed into the power station and the settlement.

== Motive Power ==
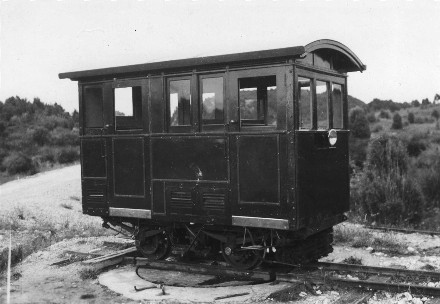
Riley railcar on turntable at Howard's Plains, 1937

Initially, the tram was worked by Krauss locomotives, while in later years an Alfa Romeo petrol locomotive was used. Several rail cars worked the line and included a 'Riley' in earlier years, while a Vauxhaull rail car was used in the later years.

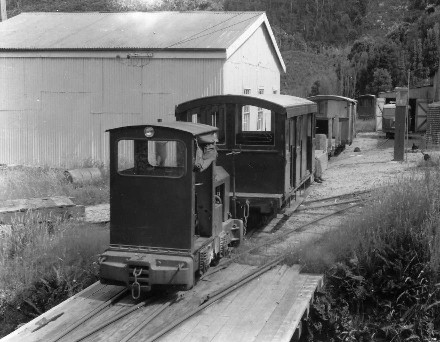
Tulloch built locomotive in use on Lake Margaret line

In 1959, the Mount Lyell Mining and Railway Company purchased two 2-foot gauge diesel shunting locomotives, manufactured by Tulloch Limited of Rhodes, New South Wales. These were intended for surface working on their system of that gauge. They were powered with a Fordson 4-cylinder 40 hp. engine. The locomotive weighed 4.5 tons. As shown in the accompanying photograph, one of these locomotives was put to use on the Lake Margaret Tram.

== Hiking Trail ==
After the tramline's tracks were removed, part of the formation was opened to the public as a hiking trail. However access to the Lake Margaret Power station was restricted for some considerable time.

== See also ==
- Railways on the West Coast of Tasmania
