= Engineer Range =

Mountain range in Tasmania, Australia

Coordinates: 42°17′S 145°45′E

Engineer Range is a mountain range in Western Tasmania, Australia.

It is located to the south east of Lake Burbury and occurs in the western edge of the Tasmanian Wilderness World Heritage Area which includes the Franklin-Gordon Wild Rivers National Park.

The range runs south east of the main line of the West Coast Range and runs between the Andrew River and Franklin River - south of Mount Fincham.

The nearest tracks or view points of the range have been the former Hydro Mount McCall track. Its lower sides adjacent to the rivers were historically locations for West Coast Piners to seek out stands of Huon pine
