= Lake Westwood (Tasmania) =

Lake in Western Tasmania, Australia

- Location in Tasmania
- Location: West Coast, Tasmania
- Coordinates: 41°53′01″S 145°35′28″E
- Type: Natural glacial lake
- Basin countries: Australia
- Surface area: 35 ha (86 acres)

Lake Westwood is a 35-hectare (86-acre) glacial lake in the Tyndalls peaks to the east of Mount Read, in the West Coast Range, West Coast of Tasmania.

The lake is located south east of the Henty Gold Mine and it lies between Lake Julia and Lake Selina adjacent to the Anthony Road that travels between Tullah and Queenstown. The features that separate the lakes are:

- Anthony Road and Lake Selina (516m) is open ground
- Lake Selina and Lake Westwood are separated by Moyle Rock (696m)
- Lake Westwood and Lake Julia are separated by Lukes Knob (719m)
- south of Lake Westwood is Julia Peak (918m) which is heavily forested on the south side

== See also ==
- List of reservoirs and dams in Australia § Tasmania
- List of lakes of Australia § Tasmania
- List of lakes in Australia § Glacial lakes
