= Mount Dundas (Tasmania) =

Mountain in Western Tasmania, Australia

- Location within Tasmania

Highest point
- Elevation: 1,143 m (3,750 ft)
- Coordinates: 41°53′24″S 145°28′12″E

Geography
- Location: Western Tasmania, Australia
- Parent range: West Coast Range

Geology
- Rock age: Jurassic

Mount Dundas is a mountain located in the West Coast region of Tasmania, Australia. The mountain is situated at the north west edge of the West Coast Range.

As colourful a history as that of Mount Lyell, Mount Dundas has had a range of mines and railways such as the North East Dundas Tramway within its vicinity.

The name is also incorporated into the name of the major newspaper of the west coast, the Zeehan and Dundas Herald.

The main copper and gold ore bearing deposits in the West Coast Range are known as occurring in the 'Mount Read Volcanics' relating to the complex geology of the area, and also silver at Mount Dundas.

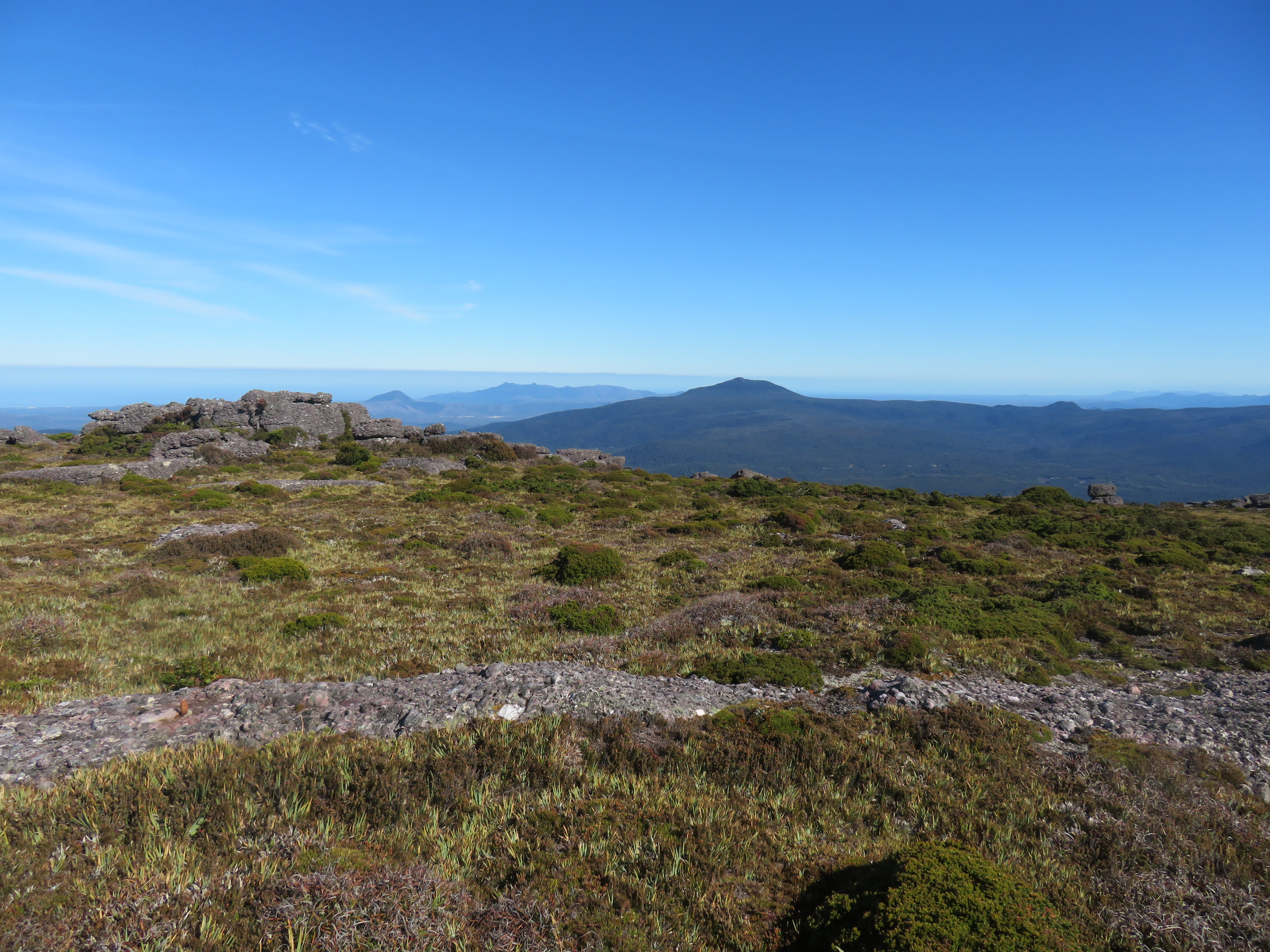
Looking to Mt Dundas north west from Mt Tyndall, Western Tasmania

== See also ==
- List of highest mountains of Tasmania
- West Coast Tasmania Mines
- Emu Bay Railway
- Railways on the West Coast of Tasmania
