= Lake Dora =

Lake Dora may refer to:

- Lake Dora (Tasmania)
- Lake Dora (Western Australia)
- Lake Dora (Florida)

== See also ==
- Dora Lake, a lake in Le Sueur County, Minnesota
