= Mount Tyndall (Tasmania) =

Mountain in Tasmania, Australia

- Location within Tasmania

Highest point
- Elevation: 1,179 m (3,868 ft)
- Coordinates: 41°55′48″S 145°35′24″E

Geography
- Location: Western Tasmania, Australia
- Parent range: West Coast Range

Geology
- Rock age: Jurassic
- Mountain type: Dolerite

Mount Tyndall is a mountain that is part of the Tyndall Range, a spur off the West Coast Range, located in the Western region of Tasmania, Australia.

The mountain was named in 1877 by James Reid Scott on the suggestion of Thomas Bather Moore in honour of Professor John Tyndall, a Fellow of the Geological Society who made important contributions in physics, atmospheric science and geology.

The area is at the northern end of a block of mountains that are north of Mount Sedgwick.

Located at the base of the mountain are a number of glacial lakes, most notably Lake Westwood and Lake Dora. The mountain lies southeast of the Henty Gold Mine, and Hydro Tasmania dam on the Henty River; and south of Lake Mackintosh, Lake Murchison and Tullah.
