= Mount Read =

Mountain in West Coast Range, Tasmania

- Location within Tasmania

Highest point
- Elevation: 1,123 m (3,684 ft)
- Coordinates: 41°50′24″S 145°32′24″E

Geography
- Location: West Coast, Tasmania, Australia
- Parent range: West Coast Range

Mount Read is a mountain located in the West Coast region of Tasmania, Australia, and is at the north west edge of the West Coast Range.

With an elevation of 1,123 metres (3,684 ft) above sea level, Mount Read has had as colourful a history, similar to that of Mount Lyell, with mines, settlements and other activities on its slopes for over a hundred years.

== Geology ==
The main copper and gold ore bearing deposits in the West Coast Range are known to occur in the Mount Read Volcanics relating to the complex geology of the area.

Mineralisation and deposits were being identified well beyond the life of the original mines utilised on Mount Read.

To the south east of Mount Read are many features of glaciation in the Tyndall Range as well as glacial lakes of Lake Westwood, Lake Selina, and Lake Julia.

== Hercules Haulage ==
The Hercules Mine on Mount Read was connected by a 1,642-foot (500 m) haulage incline to Williamsford and then to the North East Dundas Tramway. The haulage was self-acting and 1-mile (1.6 km) long and 1,642 feet (500 m) high with a maximum gradient of 1 in 5.

The mine was in production in the late nineteenth century. It had a major strike in 1906. The mine produced well into the mid twentieth century. The mine site had ceased operation and was subject to cleanup processes in the early 2000s.

The Hercules Gold and Silver Mining Company was an operating company that ceased in 1916. The Mount Read and Rosebery Mines Limited started as an ex-Mount Lyell offshoot, absorbed by EZ by 1925.

== Mount Read township ==
The community, mainly known in early sources as the Mount Read township surrounding the Hercules minesite had various struggles for services and facilities. The hotel is mentioned as early as 1898

Situated at 1000 metres Mount Read (township) was the most elevated town which has existed in Tasmania

== Huon pine ==
Despite extensive historic mining and human activity on its slopes, Mount Read has unique and significant stands of Huon pine forests on its slopes. The southern slopes of Mount Read have been identified as a special habitat enclosed in the Lake Johnston Nature Reserve.

== Climate ==
Mount Read has a subpolar oceanic climate (Köppen climate classification: Cfc), bordering on a tundra climate (Köppen climate classification: ET), heavily influenced by the Roaring Forties. It currently has a Bureau of Meteorology automatic weather station in place, and it scores well in extreme weather conditions. Its extreme rainfall records for Autumn 2006 put it on a par with the Lake Margaret rainfall – which was still apparently recorded till 30 June 2006 by Hydro employees, but not appearing on the BOM website. It has one of the highest annual rain day amount in the world at 282 days; topping Cherrapunji in India, but falling behind Mount Waialeale in Hawaii and López de Micay in Colombia, which have 335 and 315 rainy days respectively; and is especially concentrated in the winter months, with July featuring 27 days on which rain or snow falls.

Its monthly mean temperatures are comparable to those of Reykjavík in Iceland. Snowfalls are highly frequent and often very heavy, occurring at all times of the year. The mean afternoon relative humidity is the greatest anywhere in Australia, particularly in the cooler months.

Climate data for Mount Read (1996–2022); 1,120 m AMSL; 41.84° S, 145.54° E
Month	Jan	Feb	Mar	Apr	May	Jun	Jul	Aug	Sep	Oct	Nov	Dec	Year
Record high °C (°F)	30.4 (86.7)	29.5 (85.1)	27.9 (82.2)	20.6 (69.1)	15.3 (59.5)	11.4 (52.5)	10.0 (50.0)	12.5 (54.5)	16.2 (61.2)	22.6 (72.7)	24.5 (76.1)	27.6 (81.7)	30.4 (86.7)
Mean daily maximum °C (°F)	14.4 (57.9)	14.2 (57.6)	12.0 (53.6)	8.9 (48.0)	6.4 (43.5)	4.7 (40.5)	3.7 (38.7)	3.9 (39.0)	5.6 (42.1)	7.8 (46.0)	10.8 (51.4)	12.1 (53.8)	8.7 (47.7)
Daily mean °C (°F)	10.1 (50.2)	10.2 (50.4)	8.6 (47.5)	6.2 (43.2)	4.3 (39.7)	2.9 (37.2)	2.0 (35.6)	2.0 (35.6)	3.0 (37.4)	4.6 (40.3)	7.0 (44.6)	8.1 (46.6)	5.8 (42.4)
Mean daily minimum °C (°F)	5.8 (42.4)	6.2 (43.2)	5.1 (41.2)	3.4 (38.1)	2.2 (36.0)	1.0 (33.8)	0.2 (32.4)	−0.1 (31.8)	0.4 (32.7)	1.4 (34.5)	3.2 (37.8)	4.1 (39.4)	2.7 (36.9)
Record low °C (°F)	−1.2 (29.8)	−0.8 (30.6)	−4.7 (23.5)	−4.5 (23.9)	−3.9 (25.0)	−5.2 (22.6)	−5.0 (23.0)	−5.5 (22.1)	−5.1 (22.8)	−5.0 (23.0)	−4.5 (23.9)	−2.3 (27.9)	−5.5 (22.1)
Average precipitation mm (inches)	201.1 (7.92)	174.4 (6.87)	264.2 (10.40)	283.7 (11.17)	397.4 (15.65)	341.1 (13.43)	391.5 (15.41)	336.3 (13.24)	377.1 (14.85)	397.6 (15.65)	220.4 (8.68)	292.2 (11.50)	3,628.1 (142.84)
Average precipitation days (≥ 0.2 mm)	19.1	17.4	22.5	24.0	26.7	25.9	26.6	25.6	25.8	25.9	21.2	21.7	282.4
Average afternoon relative humidity (%)	76	75	84	88	94	92	95	93	91	84	77	80	86
Source: Bureau of Meteorology

== See also ==
- List of highest mountains of Tasmania
- Montezuma Falls
- West Coast Tasmania Mines
- List of oldest trees
