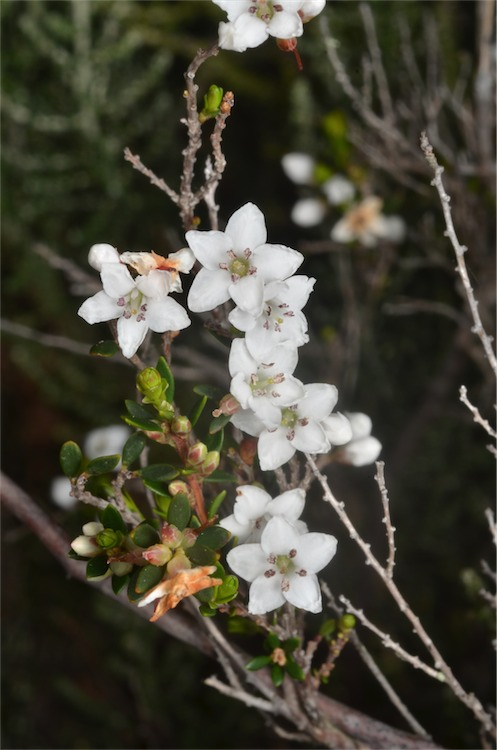
- In the Australian National Botanic Gardens

Scientific classification
- Kingdom: Plantae
- Clade: Tracheophytes
- Clade: Angiosperms
- Clade: Eudicots
- Clade: Asterids
- Order: Ericales
- Family: Ericaceae
- Genus: Epacris
- Species: E. franklinii

Binomial name
- Epacris franklinii Hook.f.

= Epacris franklinii =

Species of flowering plant

Epacris franklinii is a species of flowering plant in the heath family, Ericaceae, and is endemic to Tasmania. It is an erect, spreading shrub with lance-shaped or elliptic leaves and white, tube-shaped flowers.

== Description ==
Epacris franklinii is an erect, spreading shrub that grows up to 2 m (6 ft 7 in) high and has more or less glabrous stems. The leaves are lance-shaped or elliptic, 8–11 mm (0.31–0.43 in) long and 1.3–1.4 mm (0.051–0.055 in) wide on a petiole about 1 mm (0.039 in) long and with minute teeth on the edges. The flowers are arranged in a few leaf axils near the ends of branches, the sepals egg-shaped, about 4 mm (0.16 in) long, the petal tube slightly longer than the sepals and with shorter lobes, the anthers enclosed in the petal tube.

== Taxonomy and naming ==
Epacris franklinii was first formally described in 1857 by Joseph Dalton Hooker in The botany of the Antarctic voyage of H.M. Discovery ships Erebus and Terror. III. Flora Tasmaniae from specimens collected on the banks of the Franklin River in Macquarie Harbour by Ronald Campbell Gunn.

== Distribution and habitat ==
This epacris grows on the banks of the Meander, Mersey, Pieman, Maxwell, Gordon, Franklin and King River systems in north-western Tasmania where it is periodically inundated.
