= Lake Selina =

Lake in Tasmania, Australia

- Location in Tasmania
- Location: West Coast, Tasmania
- Coordinates: 41°52′43″S 145°36′29″E
- Type: Natural glacial lake
- Primary inflows: West Coast Range
- Basin countries: Australia
- Surface elevation: 516 m (1,693 ft) AHD

Lake Selina is a natural glacial lake located to the east of Mount Read, in the West Coast Range, on the west coast of Tasmania, Australia.

In the 1890s it was the location of mineral exploration along with nearby Lake Dora. Its location and conditions have led it to be a location of research into Pleistocene and Holocene environments.

It has an estimated surface area of 185,000 square meters and is located close to the Anthony Road B28 that travels between Tullah and Queenstown.

From the east, Lake Selina with an elevation of 516 metres (1,693 ft) AHD is the furthest east adjacent to Anthony Road; then Lake Westwood, and then Lake Julia with the elevation of 619 metres (2,031 ft); with Mount Julia to the west at 827 metres (2,713 ft) AHD.

== See also ==
- List of reservoirs and dams in Australia § Tasmania
- List of lakes of Australia § Tasmania
- List of lakes in Australia § Glacial lakes
