= Lake Dora (Tasmania) =

Lake in Tasmania, Australia

- Location in Tasmania
- Location: Western Tasmania
- Coordinates: 41°57′S 145°39′E
- Basin countries: Australia
- Surface area: 48 ha (120 acres)
- Surface elevation: 756 m (2,480 ft)

Lake Dora is a 48-hectare (120-acre) lake, and also short-lived mining area of the late 1890s, in the West Coast Range of Western Tasmania, Australia. It has a surface level of 756 metres (2,480 ft) AHD.

== Features and location ==
It has two adjacent tarns just west of it, Maxfield and Michael Tarns, and numerous unnamed smaller lakes and water features.

The nearest named features are Walford Peak at 1,009 metres (3,310 ft), approximately 1 kilometre (0.62 mi) to the north west; and Farquhar Lookout at 935 metres (3,068 ft), 3 kilometres (1.9 mi) to the south west. It is 7 kilometres (4.3 mi) north north west of Eldon Peak

Located east of the Mount Tyndall area, it was the site of a transient gold-mining rush in the late 1890s. Lake Dora is not generally accessible by road, but only via trails or by helicopter. Lake Dora lies north of Lake Spicer – into which it drains.

Charles Whitham wrote of the mining rush: "Lake Dora, Royal Dora, Lady Dora, North Dora, and, of course Dora Reward. The Government put in a good track from Mount Read, with a telephone line" (1897).

== See also ==
- List of reservoirs and dams in Australia § Tasmania
- List of lakes of Australia § Tasmania
