= C. J. Binks =

Australian writer (1931–2026)

Christopher John Binks OAM, known as C. J. Binks (26 December 1931 – 8 August 2026), was an Australian educator and writer in Tasmania.

== Life and career ==
Binks was born on 26 December 1931 and lived in Tasmania from the 1940s.

His teaching posts included The Hutchins School in Hobart, Rose Bay High School, Devonport High School, and vice principal at Don College in Devonport.

His interest in Western Tasmania led him to write Explorers of Western Tasmania, a significant history of exploration of the region, Pioneers of the West Coast, and a later work Hills of the West Wind.

Binks also wrote about Bass Strait and Devonport.

He was awarded the Medal of the Order of Australia in the 2023 King's Birthday Honours for "service to secondary education, and to literature".

Chris Binks was married from 1958 to 2018 to Mary Binks OAM. Mary Binks served on the Devonport Council as Mayor, Deputy Mayor and Alderman from 1989 for 13 years, and was a prominent advocate for rural youth and for women.

Chris Binks died on 8 August 2026 at the age of 94.
