= Lake Beatrice =

Lake in West Coast Range, Tasmania, Australia

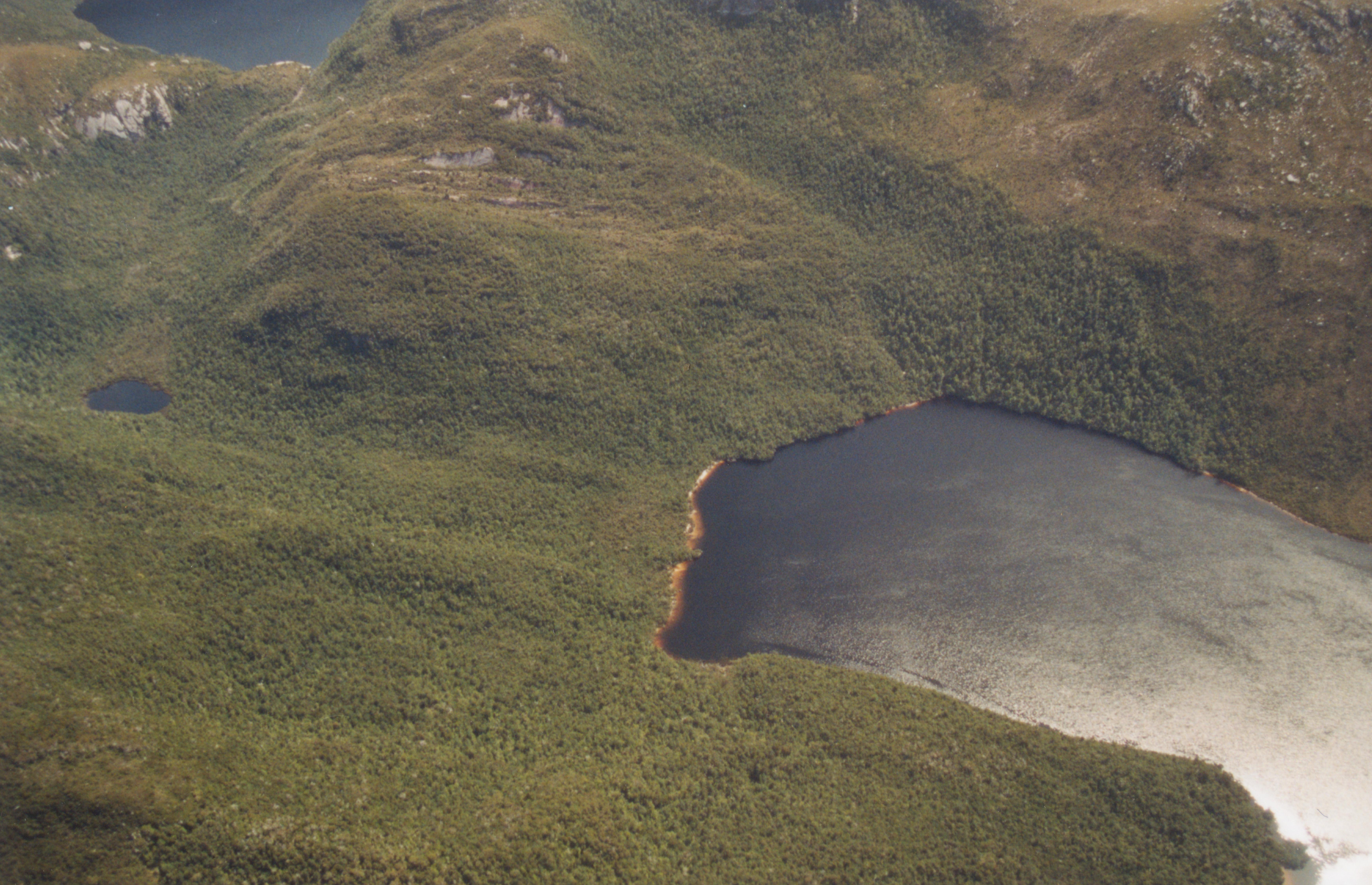
- Aerial view of part of Lake Beatrice, viewed from the east in 2001. Part of Lake Burbury can be seen, top left.

- Location of the lake in Tasmania
- Interactive map of Lake Beatrice
- Location: West Coast, Tasmania
- Coordinates: 42°00′28″S 145°39′37″E
- Type: Natural lake
- Etymology: Local mining lease
- Part of: King River
- Primary inflows: Dante Rivulet
- Primary outflows: Dante Rivulet
- Basin countries: Australia
- Surface area: 55 ha (140 acres)

Lake Beatrice is a 55-hectare (140-acre) natural lake on the lower eastern side of Mount Sedgwick in the West Coast Range of Western Tasmania, Australia.

Lake Beatrice is higher in altitude than the nearby Lake Burbury; however, it is not visible from that level, but can be seen either from the air or the higher slopes of the eastern part of Mount Lyell or the upper levels of Mount Sedgwick. The lake is fed and drained by the Dante Rivulet.

The lake was a reference point for the planned Great Western Railway that was considered at the end of the nineteenth century; however was never built.

The name of the lake and adjacent ground is tied into exploration leases held in the area.

The 3,000-hectare (7,400-acre) Lake Beatrice Conservation Area starts in the location of Lake Beatrice and continues north to Lake Huntley and Lake Rolleston; and it is bordered on either side by the 14,000-hectare (35,000-acre) Tyndall Regional Reserve.

== See also ==
- List of reservoirs and dams in Tasmania
  - Crotty Dam
- List of lakes in Tasmania
