= Mary Fisher Bookshop =

Bookshop and publisher in Tasmania

Mary Fisher Bookshop was a bookshop and publisher in Launceston in Tasmania. It was situated at 14 The Quadrant, Launceston (off St John Street). It was of the same era and style of Fullers Bookshop in Hobart. Some of the books published in the 1970s were specifically of items about history of Western Tasmania.

== Selected items relating to or including material about Western Tasmania ==
- Julen, Hans (1976), The penal settlement of Macquarie Harbour, 1822-1833 : an outline of its history, Mary Fisher Bookshop, ISBN 978-0-9599207-3-4
- Julen, Hans (1974), The early history of the Tasmanian West Coast, Mary Fischer Bookshop, ISBN 978-0-9599207-1-0
- Emberg, Joan; Emberg, Buck (1978), Gravely Tasmanian : a friendly guide to some Tasmanian graveyards, volume 1, Illustrated by George Richardson, Mary Fisher Bookshop, ISBN 978-0-9599207-7-2
- Binks, C. J (1980), Explorers of Western Tasmania, Mary Fisher Bookshop, ISBN 978-0-908291-16-8
- King, Herbert John (1974), Ratcliff, Eric V. R.; Cox, George Weymouth (eds.), Tasmania remembered : early photographs of H.J. King, Mary Fisher Bookshop, ISBN 978-0-9599207-2-7
