= Sticht Range =

Mountain range in Tasmania, Australia

- Location within Tasmania

Highest point
- Peak: unnamed peak
- Elevation: 1,080 m (3,540 ft); AHD

Geography
- Country: Australia
- State: Tasmania
- Region: West Coast
- Range coordinates: 41°54′S 145°39′E
- Parent range: West Coast Range

Geology
- Formed by: Cambrian
- Rock age: Jurassic
- Rock type: Dolerite

The Sticht Range is a mountain range in the West Coast region of Tasmania, Australia. The range runs between two tributaries of the Eldon River and is located within the eastern part of the West Coast Range and has an unnamed peak with an elevation of 1,080 metres (3,540 ft) above sea level.

It was named after Robert Carl Sticht, the manager of the Mount Lyell Mining and Railway Company.

It was affected by the 2016 Tasmanian bushfires.

== Features and access ==
The range can be viewed from the Hydro Tasmania built road (B24) at Lake Plimsoll. It is a cambrian formation range.

The threatened plant Orites milliganii, a member of the family Proteaceae, may be located in the range.

== See also ==
- List of highest mountains of Tasmania
