= Henty River =

River in Western Tasmania, Australia

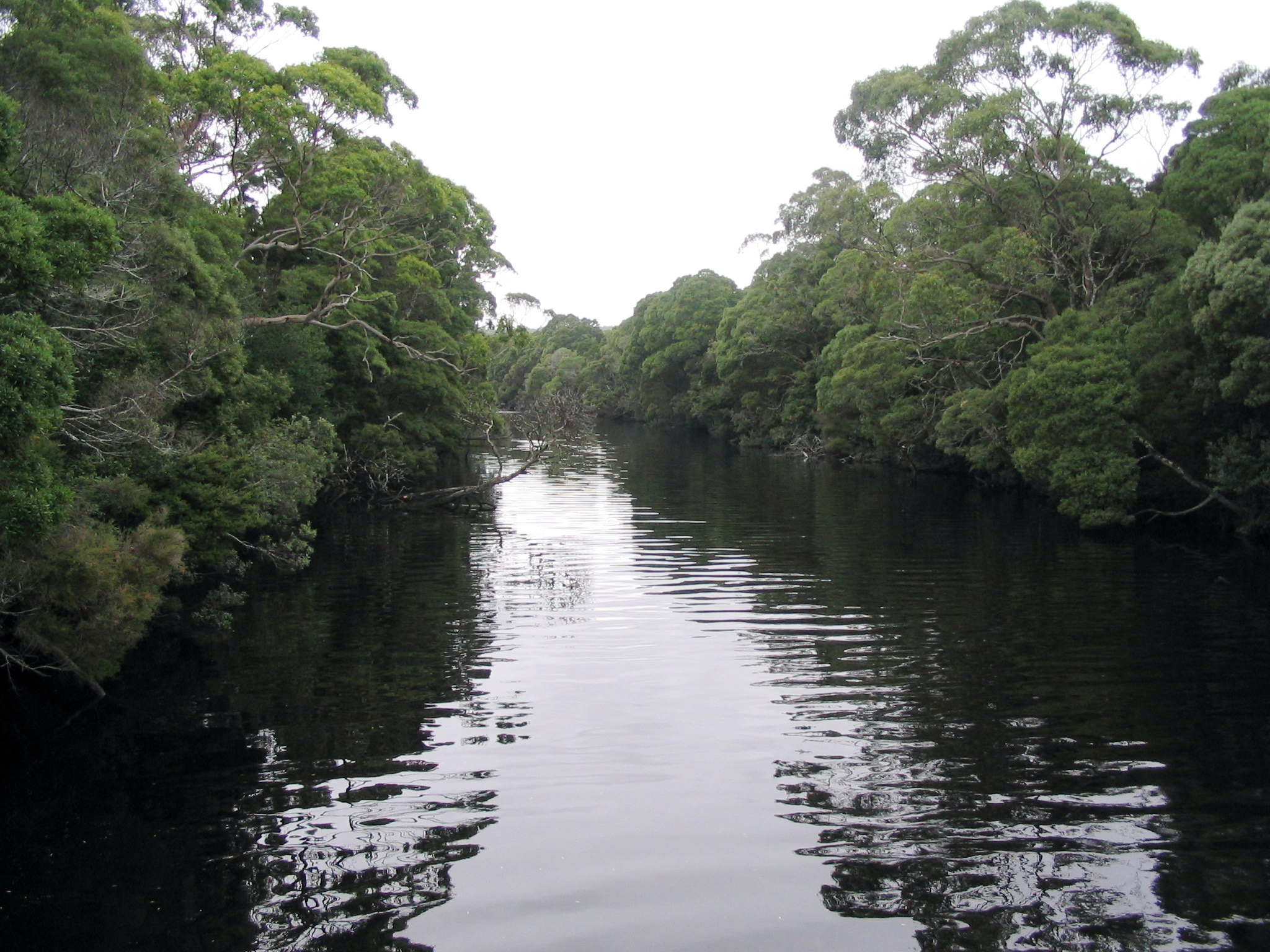
- Henty River, Tasmania

- Location of the river mouth in Tasmania

Location
- Country: Australia
- State: Tasmania
- Region: West Coast

Physical characteristics
- Source: Tyndall Range, West Coast Range
- Source confluence: Dobson Creek and Newton Creek
  - location: below Mount Tyndall
  - coordinates: 41°53′19″S 145°32′43″E
  - elevation: 264 m (866 ft)
- Mouth: Southern Ocean
  - location: Henty Dunes
  - coordinates: 42°2′44″S 145°14′43″E
  - elevation: 0 m (0 ft)
- Length: 46 km (29 mi)
- Basin size: 1009834 sm

Basin features
- Tributaries
  - left: Yolande River, Lost Creek (Tasmania), Tully River (Tasmania)
  - right: Ewart Creek, Malcom Creek, Bottle Creek, McCutcheons Creek, Badger River
- Reservoirs / Lakes: Henty Dam

The Henty River is a perennial river in the West Coast region of Tasmania, Australia. The river generally lies north of Queenstown and south of Zeehan.

== Location and features ==
Formed by the confluence of the Dobson and Newton Creeks, the river rises below Lake Newton on the western slopes of the Tyndall Range, northwest of Mount Tyndall, part of the West Coast Range of Tasmania.

The river flows generally south by west and then west, joined by eight tributaries in eluding the Bottle, Lost, Malcolm, and McCutcheom's creeks, and the Tully, Yolande, and Badger rivers. The mouth emptyies into the Southern Ocean at Henty Dunes. The river descends 264 metres (866 ft) over its 46-kilometre (29 mi) course.

In the area known as the Upper Henty at the river's headwaters is the Henty Gold Mine. Its upper reaches were some of the last sites of dam making by the Hydro Tasmania in its long history of regulating flow of Tasmanian rivers. The river catchment area has two areas of high ground. One is known as the Professor Plateau, west of the Professor Range to the north of the river, and the other Misery Flat, which is high ground between the Tully River and Lost Creek. The river basin is adjacent to the West Coast Range and the Lake Margaret areas, argued as having up to four separate periods of glaciation.

The river is crossed by bridges that carry the Zeehan-Strahan Road and the Zeehan Highway. A former bridge that carried the Strahan-Zeehan Railway, very close to the coast and Ocean Beach, has been demolished. The river is impounded by the Henty Dam, completed in 1988.

== Recreation uses ==
During October and November, the Henty River is a location for sea run trout.

Picnic spots are available beside the river at either the Strahan to Zeehan highway, or the Zeehan Highway.

== See also ==
- List of rivers of Australia § Tasmania
