= West Coast Range =

Mountain range in Tasmania, Australia

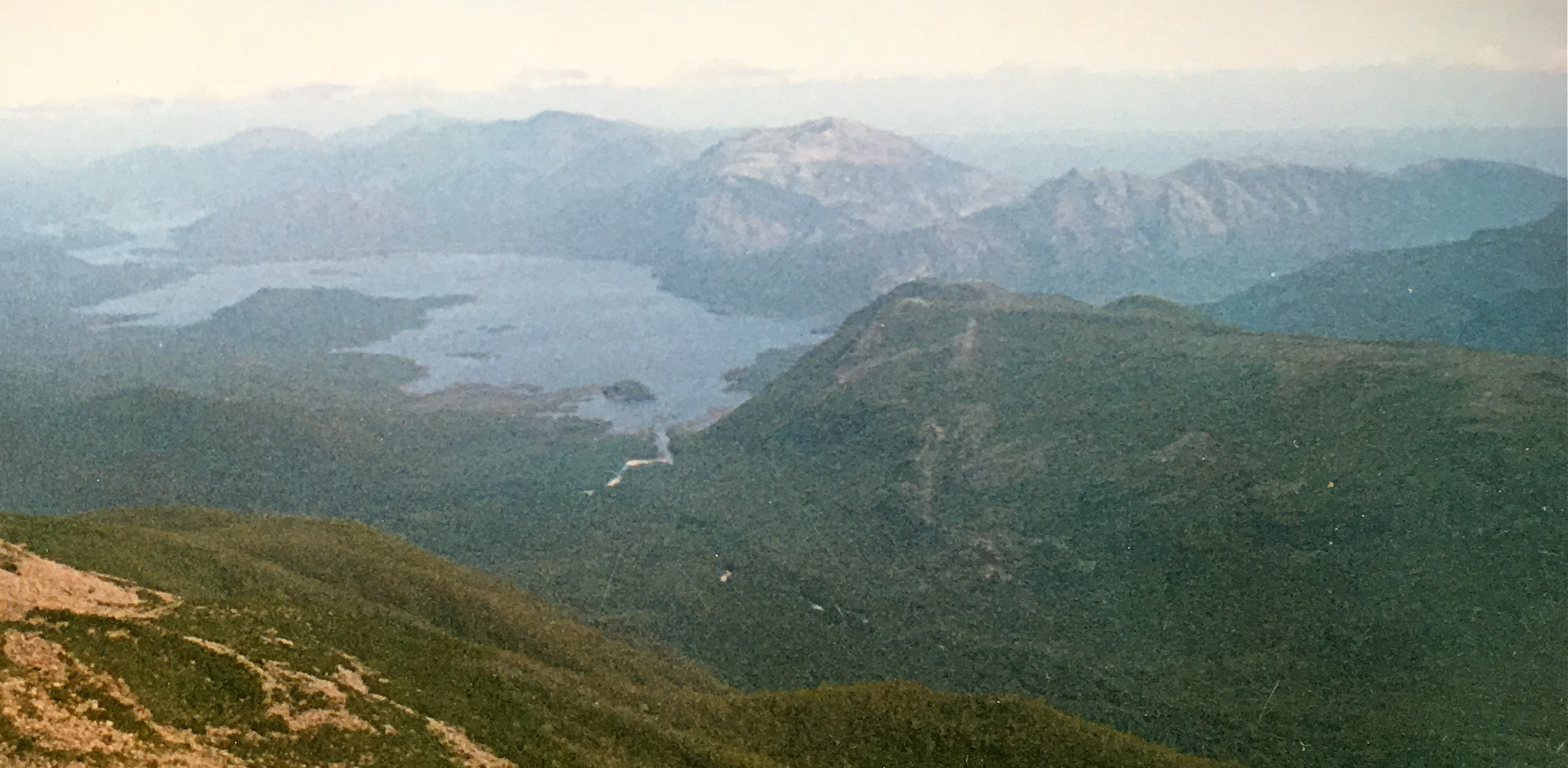
- The West Coast Range, viewed from the air in 2016

Highest point
- Peak: Mount Murchison
- Elevation: 1,275 m (4,183 ft); AHD
- Coordinates: 41°48′00″S 145°36′36″E

Geography
- Location within Tasmania
- Country: Australia
- State: Tasmania
- Range coordinates: 42°05′24″S 145°36′00″E

Geology
- Rock type: Dolerite

The West Coast Range is a mountain range in the West Coast region of Tasmania, Australia.

The range lies to the west and north of the main parts of the Franklin-Gordon Wild Rivers National Park.

The range has had a significant number of mines utilising the geologically rich zone of Mount Read Volcanics. A number of adjacent ranges lie to the east: the Engineer Range, the Raglan Range, the Eldon Range, and the Sticht Range but in most cases these are on a west–east alignment, while the West Coast Range runs in a north–south direction, following the Mount Read volcanic arc.

The range has encompassed multiple land uses including the catchment area for Hydro Tasmania dams, mines, transport routes and historical sites. Of the communities that have existed actually in the range itself, Gormanston is probably the last to remain.

== Geographical features ==
These are determined by a number of factors - the southerly direction of glaciation in the King River Valley and around the Tyndalls; as well as the general north -south orientation of the West Coast Range itself.

=== Mountains ===
The following mountains are contained within the West Coast Range, including sub-ranges without a specifically named peak and also including subsidiary peaks.

Rank	Name	Height	Location	Prominence	Notes
1	Mount Murchison	1,275 metres (4,183 ft)	41°48′00″S 145°36′36″E	760 metres (2,493 ft)	
2	Mount Geikie (Tyndall Range)	1,191 metres (3,907 ft)	41°58′12″S 145°34′12″E		
3	Mount Tyndall (Tyndall Range)	1,179 metres (3,868 ft)	41°55′48″S 145°35′24″E		
4	Mount Jukes	1,168 metres (3,832 ft)	42°10′12″S 145°34′48″E	911 metres (2,989 ft)	
5	Mount Sedgwick	1,147 metres (3,763 ft)	42°00′00″S 145°36′36″E		
6	Mount Owen	1,146 metres (3,760 ft)	42°05′24″S 145°36′00″E	774 metres (2,539 ft)	
7	Mount Sorell	1,144 metres (3,753 ft)	42°16′12″S 145°32′24″E	673 metres (2,208 ft)	
8	Mount Dundas	1,143 metres (3,750 ft)	41°53′24″S 145°28′12″E		
9	Mount Read	1,124 metres (3,688 ft)	41°50′24″S 145°32′24″E		
10	Proprietary Peak	1,103 metres (3,619 ft)	42°09′36″S 145°34′38″E		
11	Pyramid Peak	1,080 metres (3,543 ft)	42°11′24″S 145°34′48″E		
11	Sticht Range (unnamed peak)	1,080 metres (3,543 ft)	41°54′S 145°39′E		
13	West Jukes Peak	1,062 metres (3,484 ft)	42°10′48″S 145°34′12″E		
14	Mount Darwin	1,033 metres (3,389 ft)	42°15′00″S 145°35′48″E		
15	South Jukes Peak	1,014 metres (3,327 ft)	42°11′24″S 145°34′38″E		
16	Mount Hamilton	1,005 metres (3,297 ft)	41°50′24″S 145°30′36″E		
17	Mount Black	950 metres (3,117 ft)	41°45′36″S 145°33′36″E		
18	Victoria Peak	949 metres (3,114 ft)	41°47′24″S 145°40′12″E		
19	Mount Huxley	926 metres (3,038 ft)	42°08′24″S 145°35′24″E		
20	Mount Lyell	920 metres (3,018 ft)	42°03′00″S 145°36′36″E		
21	Mount Strahan	855 metres (2,805 ft)	42°14′24″S 145°30′36″E		
22	Mount Julia	843 metres (2,766 ft)	41°52′48″S 145°33′36″E		
23	South Darwin Peak	780 metres (2,559 ft)	42°17′24″S 145°34′48″E		
24	Mount Selina	760 metres (2,493 ft)	41°52′12″S 145°37′12″E		
25	Mount Farrell	711 metres (2,333 ft)	41°45′00″S 145°37′48″E		

=== Smaller hills and features ===
- Darwin Crater - a probable meteorite impact crater associated with Darwin glass
- Gooseneck Hill
- Henty Glacial Moraine
- Marble Bluff - adjacent to the confluence of the Eldon and South Eldon rivers and the northern edge of Lake Burbury
- Teepookana Plateau
- Thureau Hills - adjacent to the eastern slopes of Mount Owen and Mount Huxley
- Walford Peak - adjacent to Lake Dora

=== Rivers ===
- Anthony River on the northern part of the range
- Bird River at the southern end of the range
- Eldon River on the eastern side of the range
- Governor River on the eastern side of the range
- Henty River on the western side of the range
- King River starting in the Eldon Range and passing between Mount Huxley and Mount Jukes, dammed by The Hydro
- Mackintosh River
- Murchison River
- Pieman River
- Queen River runs through Queenstown, then to join with the King River to the west of Mount Huxley
- Sophia River
- South Eldon River
- Tofft River runs between the Thureau hills and Mount Owen and Mount Huxley
- Yolande River between Lake Margaret and the Henty River

=== Lakes ===
- Basin Lake - on the western side of the range
- Lake Adam - a tributary lake for Lake Margaret
- Lake Barnabas
- Lake Beatrice - on the eastern edge of Mount Sedgwick
- Lake Burbury - created by the damming of the King River by The Hydro
- Lake Dora
- Lake Dorothy
- Lake Huntley - on the eastern side of Mount Tyndall
- Lake Julia - in the area of the range known as 'The Tyndalls'
- Lake Mackintosh - created by damming the Mackintosh River
- Lake Magdala - a tributary lake for Lake Margaret
- Lake Martha - tributary lake for Lake Margaret
- Lake Mary, Tasmania - a tributary lake for Lake Margaret
- Lake Margaret on the northern side of Mount Sedgwick
- Lake Monica - tributary lake for Lake Margaret
- Lake Murchison - created by the damming of the Murchison River
- Lake Myra - tributary lake for Lake Margaret
- Lake Paul - tributary lake for Lake Margaret
- Lake Peter - tributary lake for Lake Margaret
- Lake Philip - a tributary lake for Lake Margaret
- Lake Plimsoll
- Lake Polycarp - a tributary lake for Lake Margaret
- Lake Rolleston - between the Tyndall Range and the Sticht Range
- Lake Selina - just west of Lake Plimsoll
- Lake Spicer - just west of Eldon Peak
- Lake Tyndall - south of Mount Tyndall
- Lake Westwood - next to Mount Julia

=== Reserves ===
- Mount Farrell Regional Reserve
- Mount Murchison Regional Reserve
- Tyndall Regional Reserve
- Lake Beatrice Conservation Area
- Princess River Conservation Area
- Crotty Conservation Area
- West Coast Range Regional Reserve (Clark River Valley)

== Vegetation ==
The slopes of Mount Owen, Mount Lyell and Mount Sedgwick are covered in stumps of forest trees killed by fires and smelter fumes from the earlier part of the twentieth century. The devastation of forests close to the mining operations at Queenstown was substantial as early as the 1890s, and continued late into the twentieth century.

Some Huon pine on the slopes of Mount Read have been found that show considerable age.

Due to fire, mining, and a range of human activities, the vegetation zones along the West Coast range can be considered to be mainly modified, and few pockets of vegetation could be considered unchanged since European presence.

The eastern side of the range is on the western boundary of the Franklin-Gordon Wild Rivers National Park, and at these points the forests are in better condition. Forestry conservation zones exist along its length in accordance with the Regional Forestry Agreement (RFA).

== Climate ==
In the average winter the "1,000 metre snowline" sees most of the mountains with snow. In previous decades, Lake Margaret was the main long-term weather-reporting location; however, the Mount Read automatic weather station now maintains extremes regularly reported on the Bureau of Meteorology website for extreme conditions. The rainfall records of Lake Margaret were on a par with Tully in Queensland for the highest rainfall in Australia. Approximations for the West Coast Range are made at 2800–3000 mm precipitation per year.

The prevailing weather is due to the location of the West Coast. It has no landmass shielding it from the Southern Ocean or Antarctic weather, and being in the Roaring Forties cold fronts and extreme weather are regular occurrences on the West Coast. The Cape Sorell Waverider Buoy which was initiated by the BOM in 1998 (there had been earlier testing buoys in the early 1990s), has given good indications of the behaviour of ocean swells to correlate with weather conditions.

Earlier weather records were kept for Queenstown and Zeehan. Due to change in population distribution and resources in the west coast, the main weather data is currently from Strahan Airport and Mount Read.

The following BOM recorded locations are relevant to West Coast Range:

BOM number	Location name	Start record	End record	Southings	Eastings	Height	Comments
097035 97	Crotty	1917	1929	-42.2000	145.6000		(Compare with Princess River and Lake Burbury Park)
097058 97	DUNDAS	1896	1917	-41.8833	145.4333		
097002 97	FARRELL SIDING	1934	1948	-41.7000	145.5500		
097003 97	GORMANSTON	1895	2000	-42.0747	145.5986	380.0	(Compare with West Lyell)
097088 97	LAKE BURBURY PARK	1995	1996	-42.0983	145.6733	245.0	
097006 97	LAKE MARGARET DAM	1912	..	-41.9939	145.5706	665.0	
097020 97	LAKE MARGARET POWER STATION	1945	..	-42.0056	145.5419	320.0	
097040 97	MAGNET	1906	1936	-41.5000	145.4500		
097085 97	Mount Read	1996	..	-41.8444	145.5419	1119.5	(Current Automatic Weather Station)
097039 97	MOUNT READ (MOUNT LYELL M.&R.)	1901	1920	-41.9000	145.5500		
097057 97	PILLINGER	1907	1924	-42.3333	145.5333		
097033 97	PRINCESS RIVER	1948	1976	-42.0833	145.6667	215.0	(Compare with Crotty |and Lake Burbury Park)
097034 97	QUEENSTOWN (7XS)	1964	1995	-42.0967	145.5447	129.0	
097008 97	QUEENSTOWN (COPPER MINE)	1906	2005	-42.0661	145.5681	191.0	
097068 97	QUEENSTOWN AERODROME	1968	1988	-42.0769	145.5294	262.0	
097086 97	QUEENSTOWN (UPPER PRINCESS CREEK)	1995	1999	-42.0833	145.5286	250.0	
097091 97	QUEENSTOWN (SOUTH QUEENSTOWN)	1996	..	-42.0972	145.5439	118.0	
097087 97	TULLAH (MEREDITH STREET)	1995	..	-41.7383	145.6108	167.0	
097056 97	TULLAH MINE SITE	1969	1978	-41.7167	145.6333	183.0	
097046 97	WILLIAMSFORD (LEVEL 5)	1965	1971	-41.8333	145.5167	853.0	
097015 97	WEST LYELL	1945	2003	-42.0622	145.5794	421.0	(On south west slope of Mount Lyell

== History and exploration ==
Early European exploration of the range was made by explorers, and by convicts escaping from Macquarie Harbour Penal Station on Sarah Island. Most occurred in the late nineteenth century, but as late as the 1940s some government maps had "unexplored", or "insufficient survey", or words to that effect.

Of the mountains that are viewable from Macquarie Harbour - most were names associated with the proponents for and against the ideas that Charles Darwin was putting forward in the late 19th century.

Thomas Bather Moore named Darwin, Geikie and Read and the Tyndall Range. Charles Gould named 1860 between 1862 Murchison, Sedgwick, Lyell and Owen; Huxley and Jukes were named later.

There were very small mining settlements in the Tyndalls, on Mount Darwin and Mount Jukes, and possibly very small camps of short duration in other locations. Linda in the Linda Valley is probably the only other remaining named location with population in a valley in the range. Queenstown lies in the Queen River valley on the western slopes of Mount Owen, or south western slopes of Mount Lyell, and is in effect 'out' of the range.

== Mining ==
The Tasmanian Mines Department (in its various names over the last hundred years) has had guides to the minerals found in Tasmania - most are found in the West Coast region, these include Barium, Copper, Gold, Pyrites, Silver, Zinc.

Mining sites, in most cases short-lived exist on the upper regions of Mount Darwin, and Mount Jukes. Longer lasting mines existed on the middle slopes of Mount Lyell (North, West and South sides), and on the middle and upper slopes of Mount Read. Mineral exploration has occurred on the slopes of almost all of the named mountains over time. Conservation measures in recent decades have put special restrictions on the activity so as to not replicate the damage of the Mount Lyell operation. A good example of the capacity to mine in a sensitive area is the Henty Gold Mine, at the northern end of the range.

== Hydro dams ==
The West Coast of Tasmania was always attractive to plans for dams for hydro electricity. The King River was surveyed for this at the time of the First World War.

Then in the 1950s and early 1960s the early HEC surveys were conducted. The upper part of the Pieman scheme dammed parts of the West Coast Range, and the final major projects of the HEC dam making project were the Henty and King River Schemes.

=== Pieman River Scheme ===
The Pieman River Power Scheme involved the damming of rivers that start in the West Coast Range. It was the scheme that followed the Gordon River Scheme - and was to be followed by the Franklin River Scheme - but in reality was followed by the King River and Henty River schemes instead.

Construction commenced in 1974 and the scheme was completed by 1987. It involved dams on the Murchison and Macintosh rivers, as well as the Pieman River. The main construction town and administrative centre for the Hydro was at Tullah.

The Mackintosh Dam and power station were north of Tullah, while the Murchsion Dam and Lake were south. A third dam - the Bastyan Dam was just north of Rosebery, while the Reece Dam was a long way to the west - close to the town of Corinna.

=== King River Scheme ===
The Crotty Dam is an 82 metre high Hydro Tasmania dam on the King River between Mount Huxley and Mount Jukes. The Darwin Dam is a saddle dam at the foot of Mount Darwin. Both of the dams contain the 54 square kilometre Lake Burbury water storage area.

== Transport ==
Initial access to the west coast region was by foot or by access from the sea - railways progressed further into the region much earlier than roads - the road from Hobart was not connected until the 1930s, and the north coast until the 1960s.

=== Railways ===
To support the Mount Lyell and North Mount Lyell mines, railways were built from ports on Macquarie Harbour and travelled to the edge of the Range. They did not traverse the range.

- North Mount Lyell Railway - port was at Pillinger in Kelly Basin
- Mount Lyell Railway - port was at Regatta Point

Similarly the lines that connected with the Emu Bay Railway - the North East Dundas Tramway for example, did not traverse the range, but travelled to the foot of the mountains where the mines were active.

=== Roads ===
The Lyell Highway connection running through the West Coast range at the Linda Valley was not constructed until the 1930s.

The road to Crotty from Queenstown (or more correctly the locality of Lynchford), built as the Mount Jukes Road by the Hydro as part of the King River dam scheme in the 1980s passed high above the King River Gorge on the northern side of Mount Jukes.

The Anthony Road constructed by the Hydro during the construction of the Anthony Power Scheme also cuts through the northern part of the range, as well as access to the glacial lakes in The Tyndalls - Lake Westwood, Lake Selina and Lake Julia.

=== Landing grounds ===
Although not currently serviced as a registered aerodrome the Queenstown airport (in operation in the 1960s and 1970s) just west of the townsite is the closest air service facility. Strahan Airport is the closest registered airport.

There have been a significant number of temporary helicopter landing sites throughout the range used by Hydro Tasmania and mineral exploration activities - but no inventory is known of these locations.

== Historical features and recent sites ==
=== Tramways and railways ===
- Comstock Tram around the slopes of Mount Lyell - not to be confused with a tramway with same name out of Zeehan.
- Lake Margaret Tram at western side of Mount Sedgwick
- North Mount Lyell Railway Linda Valley, along King River Valley, through the Crotty and Darwin townsites to Pillinger and Kelly Basin.

=== Townsites ===
- Crotty on the eastern slopes of Mount Jukes
- Darwin on the eastern slopes of Mount Darwin
- Gormanston on the northern slopes of Mount Owen
- Lake Margaret precinct
- Linda in the Linda Valley between Mounts Owen and Lyell
- Tullah amidst Lake Rosebery
- Rosebery
- Williamsford

=== Mine sites ===
- Henty Gold Mine
- Mount Jukes Mine sites on the upper slopes -including 'Lake Jukes Mine'

=== Hydro sites ===
- Anthony Power Station
- Bastyan Power Station
- Crotty Dam
- Darwin Dam
- John Butters Power Station
- Lake Margaret Power Station
- Franklin River proposed power development - cancelled in the 1980s
- Gordon River proposed power development - cancelled in the 1980s

=== Main roads ===
- Lyell Highway [A10] in the Linda Valley between Mounts Owen and Lyell
- The Henty River Rd [B24] From Henty Glacial Moraine to the Lake Murchison Dam (Anthony Power Station) and Tullah

=== Walking tracks ===
Numerous historic walking tracks were started in the nineteenth and twentieth century; some survive, some are overgrown. The most famous of the track makers was Thomas Bather Moore. He named many features including Mount Strahan, the Thureau Hills and the Tofft River.

== Geological mapping ==
A major mapping of the region of the range was conducted between 1986 and 1993

- Map 1. Geology of the Mt. Charter-Hellyer area.
- Map 2. Geology of Rosebery-Mt. Black area.
- Map 3. Geology of the Henty River-Mt. Read area
- Map 4. Geology of the Mt. Murchison area
- Map 5. Geology of the Tyndall Range area
- Map 6. Geological compilation map of the Mount Read volcanics & associated rocks, Hellyer to south Darwin Peak
- Map 7. Geology of the Back Peak-Cradle Mountain Link Road area (not West Coast Range area)
- Map 8. Geology of the Mt. Cattley-Mt. Tor area (not West Coast Range area)
- Map 9. Geology of the Winterbrook-Moina area (not West Coast Range area)
- Map 10. Geology of the Elliott Bay-Mt. Osmund area (not West Coast Range area)
- Map 11. Geology of the Wanderer River-Moores Valley area (not West Coast Range area)
- Map 12. Geology of the D'Aguilar Range area (not West Coast Range area)
- Map 13. Geology of the Mt. Jukes-Mt. Darwin area.

== See also ==
- List of highest mountains of Tasmania
