= Franklin–Gordon Wild Rivers National Park =

- IUCN category II (national park)
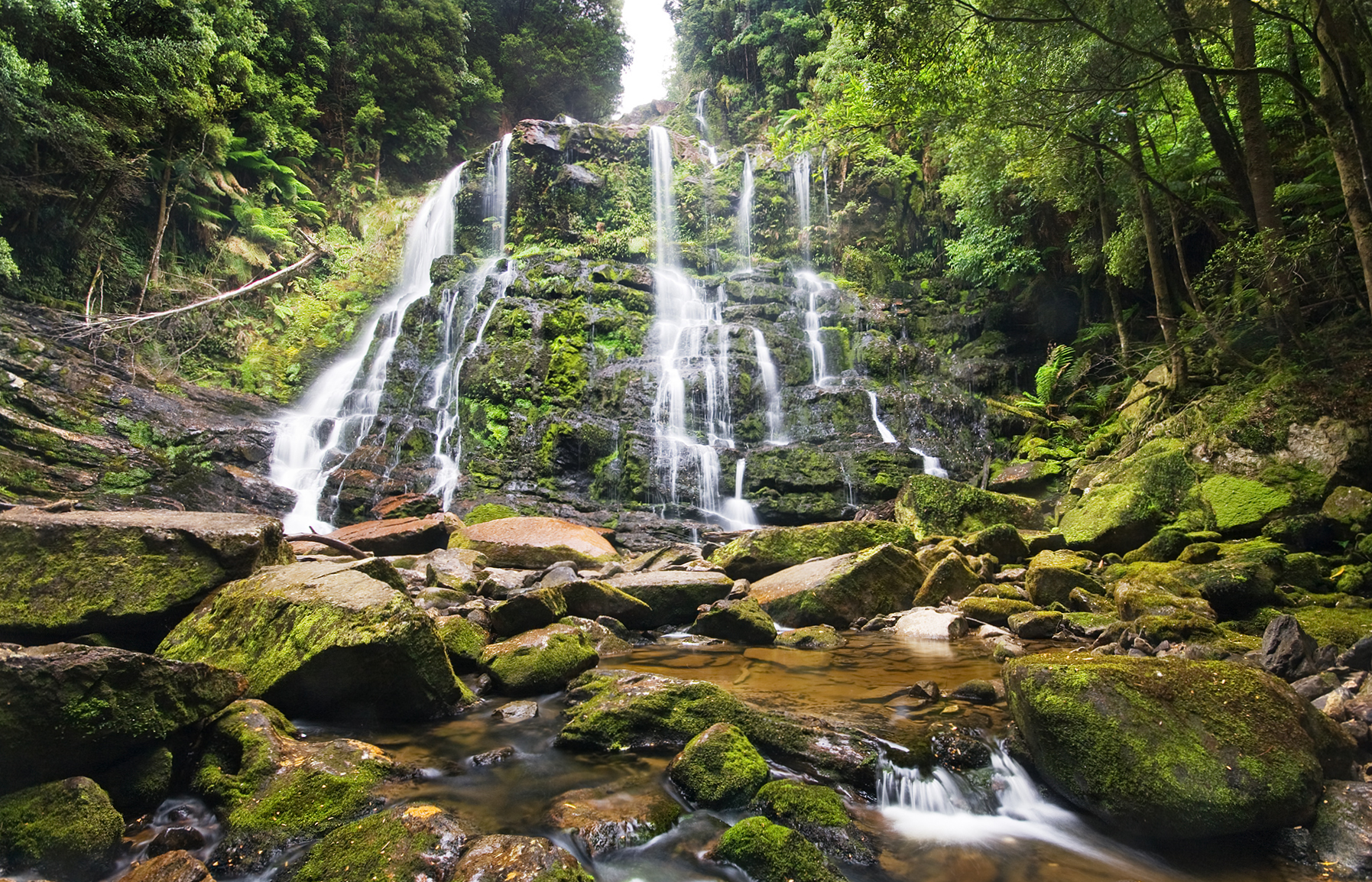
- Nelson Falls

- Location within Tasmania
- Interactive map of Franklin–Gordon Wild Rivers National Park
- Location: Tasmania
- Nearest city: Strathgordon
- Coordinates: 42°24′34″S 146°01′55″E
- Area: 4,463.42 km^{2} (1,723.34 sq mi)
- Established: 1908
- Governing body: Tasmania Parks and Wildlife Service
- Website: Official website

UNESCO World Heritage Site
- Criteria: Cultural: iii, iv, vi, vii; natural: viii, ix, x
- Reference: 181
- Inscription: 1982 (6th Session)

Franklin–Gordon Wild Rivers is a national park in Tasmania, 117 km west of Hobart. It is named after the two main river systems lying within the bounds of the park, the Franklin River and the Gordon River.

== Location ==
The Franklin–Gordon Wild Rivers National Park lies between the Central Highlands and West Coast Range of Tasmania in the heart of the Tasmanian Wilderness World Heritage Area.

It is bisected by the only road to pass through this area, the Lyell Highway.

== History ==
The genesis of the Wild Rivers National Park was in the earlier Frenchmans Cap National Park which had the Franklin River as its boundary on the northern and western borders. Frenchmans Cap is a dominant feature in the region, and can be seen on the skyline from the west and north of the park.

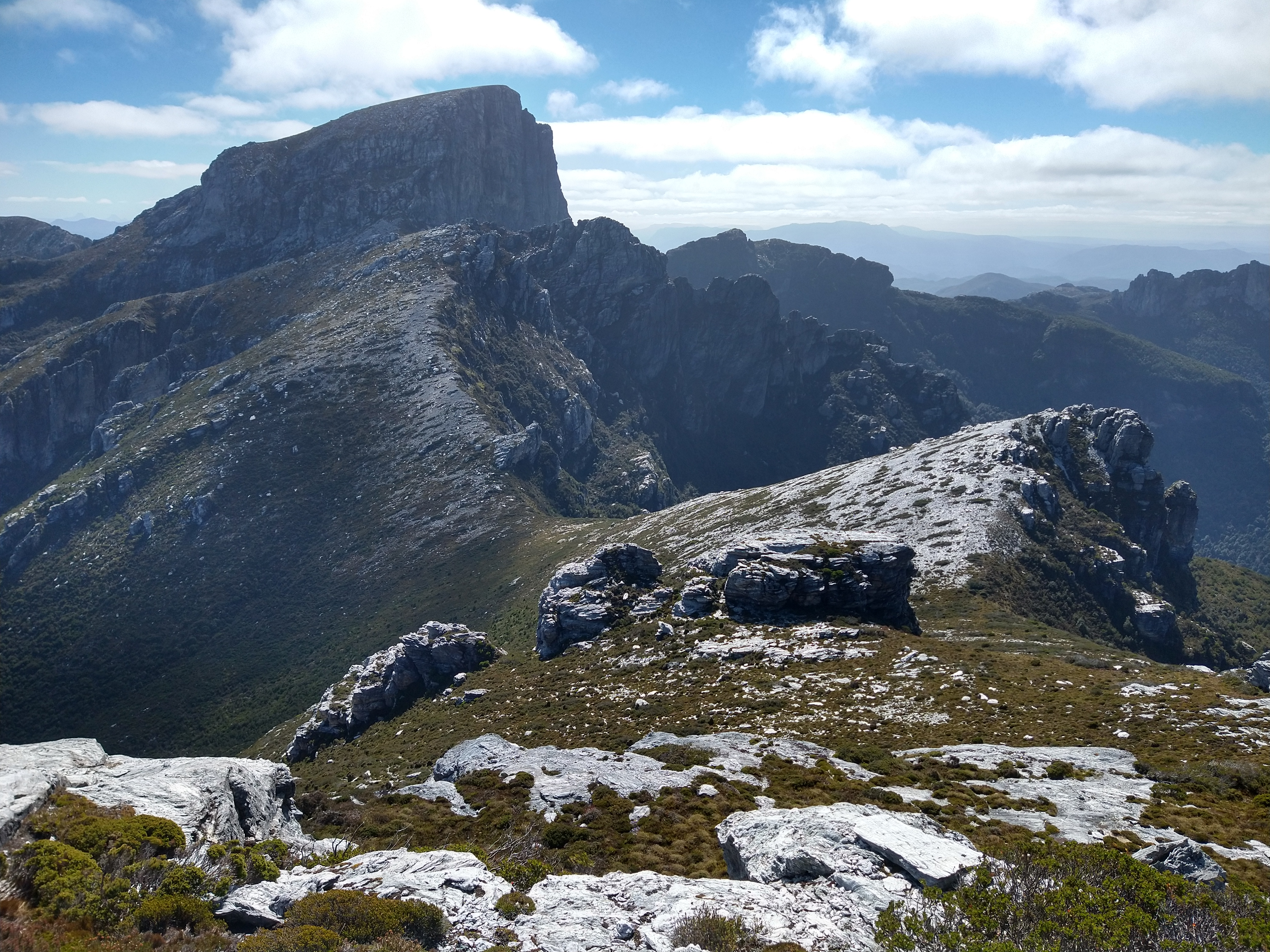
View of Frenchmans Cap from Clytemnestra, Franklin Gordon Wild Rivers National Park

The Gordon and Franklin Rivers were the subject of one of Australia's largest conservation efforts. The Franklin Dam was part of a proposed hydro-electric power scheme that had been in the plans of Hydro Tasmania for some time. The enthusiastic endorsement by Robin Gray's Liberal government would have seen the river flooded. It became a national issue for the Tasmanian Wilderness Society, led by its director at the time, Bob Brown.

Despite being given heritage status, the catchments and rivers remain at risk.

== Access points ==
The Lyell Highway winds for 56 kilometres through the heart of the Franklin–Gordon Wild Rivers National Park.

== See also ==
- Commonwealth v Tasmania
- Darwin Crater, a suspected meteorite impact crater located within the park
- Protected areas of Tasmania
- List of national parks of Australia
