= Lake Margaret Dam =

Dam and hydroelectric power station of the West Coast of Tasmania, Australia

- Location of the dam in Tasmania
- Interactive map of Lake Margaret Dam
- Country: Australia
- Location: West Coast, Tasmania
- Coordinates: 41°59′31″S 145°34′18″E
- Purpose: Power
- Status: Operational
- Construction began: 1914
- Opening date: 1918
- Built by: Mount Lyell Mining and Railway Company
- Owner: Hydro Tasmania

Dam and spillways
- Type of dam: Gravity dam
- Impounds: Yolande River
- Height: 17 m (56 ft)
- Length: 243 m (797 ft)
- Dam volume: 6,000 m^{3} (210,000 cu ft)
- Spillways: 1
- Spillway type: Uncontrolled
- Spillway capacity: 29 m^{3}/s (1,000 cu ft/s)

Reservoir
- Creates: Lake Margaret
- Total capacity: 15,374 ML (12,464 acre⋅ft)
- Catchment area: 21 km^{2} (8.1 sq mi)
- Surface area: 158.3 ha (391 acres)
- Normal elevation: 660 m (2,170 ft) AHD

Lake Margaret Power Station
- Coordinates: 41°59′24″S 145°34′48″E
- Operator: Hydro Tasmania
- Commission date: 1914 (A, B, C & D); 1918 (E & F); 1930 (G); 2009 (recommission A-G)
- Decommission date: 1. Continual use 2. 1994; since recommissioned; 2006 (A-G)
- Type: Conventional; Mini-hydro
- Hydraulic head: 325 m (1,066 ft)
- Turbines: 6 x 1.2 MW (1,600 hp) (Boving Pelton-type); 1 x 1.2 MW (1,600 hp) (James Gordon Pelton-type); 1 x 3.2 MW (4,300 hp) (Turgo-type)
- Installed capacity: 8.3 MW (11,100 hp); 3.2 MW (4,300 hp)
- Annual generation: 69 GWh (250 TJ)
- Website hydro.com.au

Tasmanian Heritage Register
- Official name: Lake Margaret Power Scheme
- Type: Permanently registered
- Reference no.: 10863

The Lake Margaret Dam is a concrete-faced gravity dam across the Yolande River, located on the north side of Mount Sedgwick, in the West Coast Range, West Coast of Tasmania, Australia. Completed in 1918 by the Mount Lyell Mining and Railway Company for the purpose of generating hydro-electric power, the impounded reservoir has the eponymous name of Lake Margaret.

Water from the reservoir is supplied to the Lake Margaret Power Station, located below the dam wall. Following the closure of the Mount Lyell Mining and Railway Company, in 1985 the control of the dam, lake, and power station was transferred to Hydro Tasmania.

The Lake Margaret Power Scheme was added to the Tasmanian Heritage Register in c. 2006.

== Dam overview ==
The dam was completed in 1918 and it was the first gravity dam constructed in Tasmania. It was built of concrete with conglomerate "plums". The dam wall is 17 metres (56 ft) high and is 243 metres (797 ft) long and the concrete-faced dam wall has a volume of 6,000 cubic metres (210,000 cu ft). The uncontrolled spillway has a flow capacity of 29 cubic metres per second (1,000 cu ft/s). In 1974 the dam wall was strengthened by the use of prestressed anchors and grouting of open joints.

The Lake Margaret dam impounds the Yolande River, which also is the outflow from the dam. Further west the Yolande joins with the Langdon River, another West Coast Range west flowing river, to join with the Henty River west of the Zeehan Highway.

=== Reservoir ===
The 158.3-hectare (391-acre) reservoir, also called Lake Margaret, with an elevation of 660 metres (2,170 ft) AHD, lies east of Mount Cyril, that has an elevation of 797 metres (2,615 ft), and south of Mount Geikie, that has an elevation of 1,191 metres (3,907 ft), both in the West Coast Range. Mount Sedgwick is to the south. The Bastion, at 1,107 metres (3,632 ft), which is a steep cliff face that is immediately west of Lake Magdala and north of Mount Geikie, together with Farquhar Lookout, with an elevation of 935 metres (3,068 ft), define a rough line of the northern part of the 21-square-kilometre (8.1 sq mi) catchment area.

Numerous smaller lakes – some named and some not – lie above the location of the Lake Margaret. The vesting of the catchment with the current operator of the hydro electric power station, makes the two feeder parts of the catchment specific Hydro land in contrast to the surrounding landscape which is either in the Tyndall Regional Reserve or the Lake Beatrice Conservation Area.

The two southern feeder Hydro reserves start from the slopes of Mount Sedgwick, the westerly from Lake Barnables (less than one kilometre (zero point six two miles) east of Lake Margaret), then to Lake Phillip. The eastern feeder starts at an unnamed lake to Lake Polycarp, Lake Peter, Lake Paul, Lake Apollos, and then to Lake Phillip. The northern feeder starts from Lake Monica, Lake Myra, then Lake Magdala, situated at 782 metres (2,566 ft) AHD, Lake Martha, at 757 metres (2,484 ft), and Lake Mary, at 732 metres (2,402 ft), before flowing into Lake Margaret.

The larger lower altitude natural lake of the area lies to the south east side of Mount Sedgwick and is known as Lake Beatrice.

== Hydroelectric power station ==
The Lake Margaret Power Stations comprise two hydroelectric power stations located in Western Tasmania, Australia. The power stations are part of the King – Yolande Power Scheme and are owned and operated by Hydro Tasmania. Generally collectively referred to in the singular format as the Lake Margaret Power Station, the two power stations are located approximately 2.5 kilometres (1.6 mi) apart and are called the Upper Lake Margaret Power Station, a conventional hydroelectric power station, and the Lower Lake Margaret Power Station, a mini-hydroelectric power station.

The Upper Lake Margaret Power Station was constructed by the Mount Lyell Mining and Railway Company between 1911 and 1914. The 'concrete dam, pipeline, power house, transmission lines and all the necessary machinery were erected ... under the supervision of George [W.] Wright' Chief Mechanical Engineer. In 1984, the station was sold to the Tasmanian Hydro-Electric Commission and was officially decommissioned in 2006 and, after a multimillion-dollar refit, was recommissioned in 2009. The Lower Lake Margaret Power Station was built also by the Mount Lyell Mining and Railway Company in 1931 and decommissioned in 1995. After the implementation of a mini-hydro project in 2009, the project was recommissioned in 2010.

While the mine has since closed, the purpose of Lake Margaret to generate power remains unchanged. Between 1918 and 1930 the Mount Lyell Mining and Railway Company commissioned seven conventional Pelton turbine generators with a capacity of 8.3 megawatts (11,100 hp) at the Upper Lake Margaret Power Station. Hydro Tasmania took ownership of the power station in 1985. Water travels from Lake Margaret through a woodstave 2.2-kilometre (1.4 mi) pipeline to the power station.

In 1931 a minihydro plant was constructed to provide additional power. The single Turgo turbine generates 3.2-megawatt (4,300 hp). Hydro Tasmania took ownership of the power station in 1985 and decommissioned the plant in 1994. The station was reopened in 2010 following refurbishment that included a new penstock, turbine and woodstave pipeline.

=== Technical details ===
Part of the King – Yolande scheme that comprises three hydroelectric power stations, the Lake Margaret Power Stations utilise water from Lake Margaret which was dammed to increase the storage volume and head. A key feature of the development is a 2.2-kilometre (1.4 mi)-long woodstave pipeline which connects the dam to a steel penstock which feeds the power station. In 2009 a new pipeline of Alaskan Yellow Cedar replaced the native King Billy Pine pipeline constructed in 1937.

The upper power station was recommissioned in 2009 by Hydro Tasmania and has six 1.2-megawatt (1,600 hp) Boving Pelton-type turbines and one 1.2-megawatt (1,600 hp) James Gordon Pelton-type turbine with a combined generating capacity of 8.4 megawatts (11,300 hp) of electricity. Within the station building, each of the seven horizontal axis turbines are connected to open wheel generators. The first four machines were installed in 1914. Two more were added in 1918 and a seventh machine was added in 1930. Each turbine is fitted with a motorised inlet valve. The generators are connected to individual machine circuit breakers which are connected to circuit breakers for each of the four transmission circuits contained in a split bus. The station output is estimated to be 48 gigawatt-hours (170 TJ) annually.

The lower power station was recommissioned in 2010 by Hydro Tasmania and has a three-jet Turgo turbine with a generating capacity of 3.2 megawatts (4,300 hp) of electricity. Water is delivered to the station via a 1.9-kilometre (1.2 mi) wood stave pipeline and 254-metre (833 ft) Fibre Reinforced Plastic penstock. The station output is estimated to be 21 gigawatt-hours (76 TJ) annually.

The power scheme received a Historic Engineering Marker from Engineers Australia as part of its Engineering Heritage Recognition Program.

== History ==
In 1911 the Mount Lyell Mining and Railway Company decided to make more extensive use of electricity in its smelting operations in the mining town of Queenstown, on Tasmania's west coast. It selected Lake Margaret, a small lake high up on Mount Sedgwick, to the north-west of the town, as its catchment area.

In 1911, construction of a gravity dam commenced, which raised the original lake by 6 metres (20 ft). The water was originally conveyed from the dam via a 2.2-kilometre (1.4 mi) wood stave pipeline. The Australian Woodpipe Company was consulted and employed to construct the wooden pipeline. The Mount Lyell Mining & Railway Company determined that not only was a wooden pipeline cheaper to construct, but it was also more efficient and durable than iron or steel. The local native Tasmanian timber King Billy Pine was studied but it was decided not to be suitable.

"With regard to King William Pine, we are sorry to say that we do not consider this at all suitable for the purpose of pipe construction on account of its lack of uniform density. We did prepare an estimate for constructing the pipe at your Works from Pine to be supplied by you, and our estimate actually worked out at a lower figure than that of your engineers, but we feel that we would not like to be associated with the manufacture of a pipe made from this timber. We regret being compelled to arrive at this decision because we have been searching Australasia for a suitable timber, and thought that the Pine in question might have answered the purpose."

— Albert G. McDonald, an interstate representative for the Australian Woodpipe Company, in a letter to Robert Carl Sticht, the General Manager of the Mount Lyell Mining & Railway Co Ltd, 13 June 1913

The wood stave pipeline was subsequently constructed from Oregon Pine (Douglas Fir), which was imported from Canada. The timber was shipped to the west coast town of Strahan and was transported to the Lake Margaret precinct via the Abt Railway. This pipeline rapidly deteriorated and in 1938 was replaced by a King Billy Pine wood stave pipeline, with the timber sourced locally. This pipeline was still in service until the 30 June 2006 closure of the Lake Margaret Power Scheme.

The wood stave pipeline originally joined two 29-inch-diameter (740 mm) steel penstock pipes which dropped 330 metres (1,080 ft) to the power station building in the Yolande Valley below. Due to the efficiency of the scheme another penstock pipe was added in 1919. Due to internal deterioration these pipes were replaced in 1969 with a single 48-inch-diameter (1,200 mm) steel pipe, by contractor John Holland. This replacement coincided with major refurbishment of the power station building, renewal of sections of the Lower Power Scheme wood stave pipeline, replacement of the transmission lines between the power station and the Queenstown substation, and post-stressing of the Lake Margaret dam wall.

The Lake Margaret Lower Power Scheme was opened in 1931. Showcasing the ingenuity and resourcefulness of the men in charge at the time, it was located downstream from the main power station and utilised water that had already powered the turbines in the main station. It housed a single Boving-Francis type turbine which, whilst having to be manually started, could be remotely controlled from the main power station, demonstrating a unique system that is considered significant in the history of power generation in Tasmania and Australia. The Lower Power Scheme was mothballed in the early 1990s.

=== Closure ===
The power plant itself produced 8.4 megawatts (11,300 hp) of peak power from seven Pelton turbines, with an average output of 5.5 megawatts (7,400 hp) (limited by rainfall into the catchment), four of which were in service from when the building opened in 1914, two since 1919 and the 7th since 1930.

Throughout 2005 the old plant was still in full-time use, but became the subject of debate. The Lake Margaret Precinct and Power Station were nominated for inclusion in the state heritage register due to the unique nature of the station's role as an integral part of West Coast history that has not been closed down or destroyed – the fate of many of the man made structures on the west coast that no longer serve purposes for the mining or other industries.

On 30 June 2006 the Lake Margaret Power Station closed, due to the cost and increasing difficulty of maintaining the decrepit King Billy Pine pipeline. In the days immediately before closure, five machines were operating at full output, one was idle due to insufficient water pressure and another out of service due to requiring replacement turbine buckets.

At the time of closure the pipeline was estimated to be losing 10% of the water it carried due to leakage. During early 2007 the extent of leakage was sufficient of itself to draw down the level in Lake Margaret by around 10% during a period of very low rainfall. At this time the pipeline was still under pressure although the power station remained closed.

Hydro Tasmania proposed refurbishment of the scheme with a return to operation around 2009–10. Community consultation found a strong preference for refurbishment using the existing machines plus a new wood stave pipeline rather than the use of new machines or a steel pipe.

Any reuse of the existing machinery would likely involve the installation of automatic shutdown capability to avoid the need for 24-hour manning of the power station in order to improve the economics of refurbishment. All of Tasmania's other major hydro-electric power stations were either originally built to operate unmanned (standard procedure for new power stations in Tasmania since the 1950s) or have been refurbished in recent years to enable unmanned operation.

=== Reopening ===
In June 2008 a decision was made to return the Lake Margaret Power Station back to operational capacity. Following the various public and other efforts - the Lake Margaret system was reopened in 2009. The refurbishment included rebuilding the 2.2 kilometres (1.4 mi) wood stave penstock for the upper power station. The upper power station was reopened on 12 November 2009, and the lower power station on 23 July 2010.

== Contemporary culture ==
Activities inside the village hall during the 'Back to Lake Margaret Day' in 2007

On 18 March 2007 Hydro Tasmania hosted the 'Back to Lake Margaret Day' at the Lake Margaret Hydro-Electric Scheme. The event was for people interested in the past and future of the Lake Margaret scheme. Approximately 200 people attended, including previous residents and employees. The day was officially opened by Alex Wilkinson, the oldest known person who has an association with the scheme. The former power station was open for inspection, as were two of the empty c. 1914 cottages which had formerly housed many of the attendees at the event. The event coincided with the Mount Lyell Twenty-Five Year Reunion Dinner, held in Queenstown on the same weekend and included many former employees who had an association with the power station.

In October 2014, the Queenstown Heritage and Arts Festival (now known as The Unconformity) programme included events and arts works at the Lake Margaret precinct.

== See also ==
- List of power stations in Tasmania
- List of dams and reservoirs in Australia § Tasmania
- List of lakes of Australia § Tasmania
