= Lyell Highway =

Highway in Western and Central Tasmania

Lyell Highway Tasmania
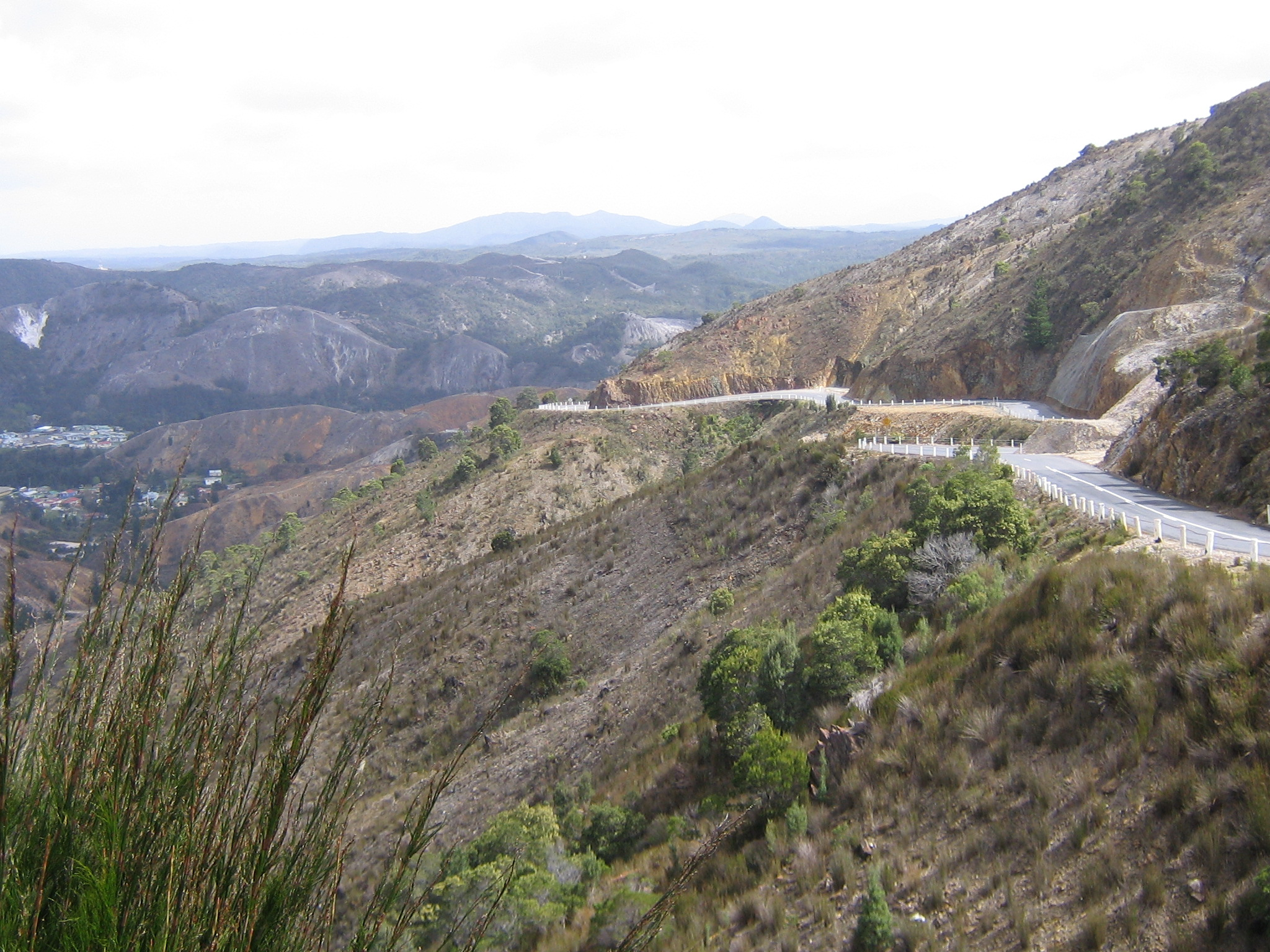
- Lyell Highway descending towards Queenstown

General information
- Type: Highway
- Length: 248 km (154 mi)
- Route number(s): A10; Granton — Queenstown; B24; Queenstown — Strahan
- Former route number: State Route 8

Major junctions
- SSE end: Brooker Highway; Granton, Hobart, Tasmania
- Montagu Street; Rocks Road; Gordon River Road; Hollow Tree Road; Marlborough Highway; Zeehan Highway
- NNW end: Esplanade; Strahan, Tasmania

Location(s)
- Major settlements: New Norfolk, Ouse, Queenstown

Highway system
- Highways in Australia; National Highway • Freeways in Australia; Highways in Tasmania

The Lyell Highway (Route A10) is a highway in Tasmania, running from Hobart to Queenstown. It is the one of two transport routes that passes through the West Coast Range, the other being the B28 Anthony Road.

== Name ==
The name is derived from Mount Lyell, the mountain peak where copper was found in the late 19th century; the Mount Lyell Mining and Railway Company was the predominant business in Queenstown for almost 100 years.

== Hobart to Central Highlands section ==
Starting at Granton it winds along the southern side of the River Derwent in a generally north westerly direction to New Norfolk. This section has in the past been susceptible to flooding.

At New Norfolk it crosses the River Derwent and winds its way through hilly terrain to Hamilton. Just prior to Hamilton is the turnoff to Bothwell via a sealed route that passes Arthurs Lake and ultimately goes on to Launceston.

== Central Highlands section ==
After Hamilton, the small town of Ouse is the only other population centre on the highway until the former Hydroelectricity town of Wayatinah.

When the highway was first constructed, it made use of existing tracks and roads in the Victoria Valley area, directly north of Ouse, leaving the Ouse and River Derwent valleys and climbing the hilly country through the towns of Osterley, Victoria Valley and Dee before rejoining the present highway near Brontë. This route closely skirts Dee Lagoon, and runs close to several other lakes, particularly Lake Echo. The now-bypassed road is narrow, and unsealed.

When the hydro-electric system was expanding and their works were under construction at Tarraleah, the highway was re-aligned to follow the River Derwent until it passed Tarraleah to provide better access to the area for construction vehicles. The Ouse–Tarraleah section was opened to traffic in August 1940 even though construction work had not finished. After Tarraleah the road climbs steeply out of the Nive River gorge until it re-joins the original route near Brontë.

At Brontë the Marlborough Highway (B11) turns off the main road and leads to the Great Lake, where it joins the Lakes Highway and eventually runs to Deloraine.

A common short-cut is the "14-Mile Road" (C601), a gravel road which cuts across the Nive Plains just after Tarraleah, by-passing the steep Tarraleah Gorge section, re-joining the highway several kilometres past Brontë. It is not a safe alternative as it is a narrow, unsealed road, and can be frequented by log-trucks. In wintry conditions the whole of the Central Highlands section is susceptible to black ice, and it can be exceptionally bad in the heavily forested section west of Ouse, but it can be encountered all the way to the west coast. Snow is usually encountered in the Derwent Bridge area during most winters and may force closure of the road occasionally for several days. This applies to both the newer Tarraleah section and the older Osterley–Lake Echo–Dee section.

As the highway enters Derwent Bridge it strikes a midpoint between Lake St Clair to the north, and Lake King William to the south.

== West Coast section ==
This section is usually known as that west of Derwent Bridge or Mount King William.

It runs through the Franklin-Gordon Wild Rivers National Park, and through the West Coast Range before reaching Queenstown. There has also been a state reserve along the highway.

The highway did not reach Queenstown until November 1932, and was not properly surfaced for some time after that, and frequently blocked.

During construction in the late 1920s and early 1930s it was called the West Coast Road.

Due to its altitude, the section of the highway over the plateau between Derwent Bridge and Mount King William is often closed during winter due to ice and snow. It can also be affected by rockfalls.

With the damming of the King River and the creation of Lake Burbury, the highway was re-routed to a narrow point where the Bradshaw bridge could be constructed across the lake.

== See also ==
- Highways in Australia
- List of highways in Tasmania

== Notes ==
- Blainey, Geoffrey (2000). The Peaks of Lyell (6th ed.). Hobart: St. David's Park Publishing. ISBN 0-7246-2265-9.
- Whitham, Charles. Western Tasmania: A Land of Riches and Beauty.
