= Franklin River =

River in western Tasmania, Australia

Franklin
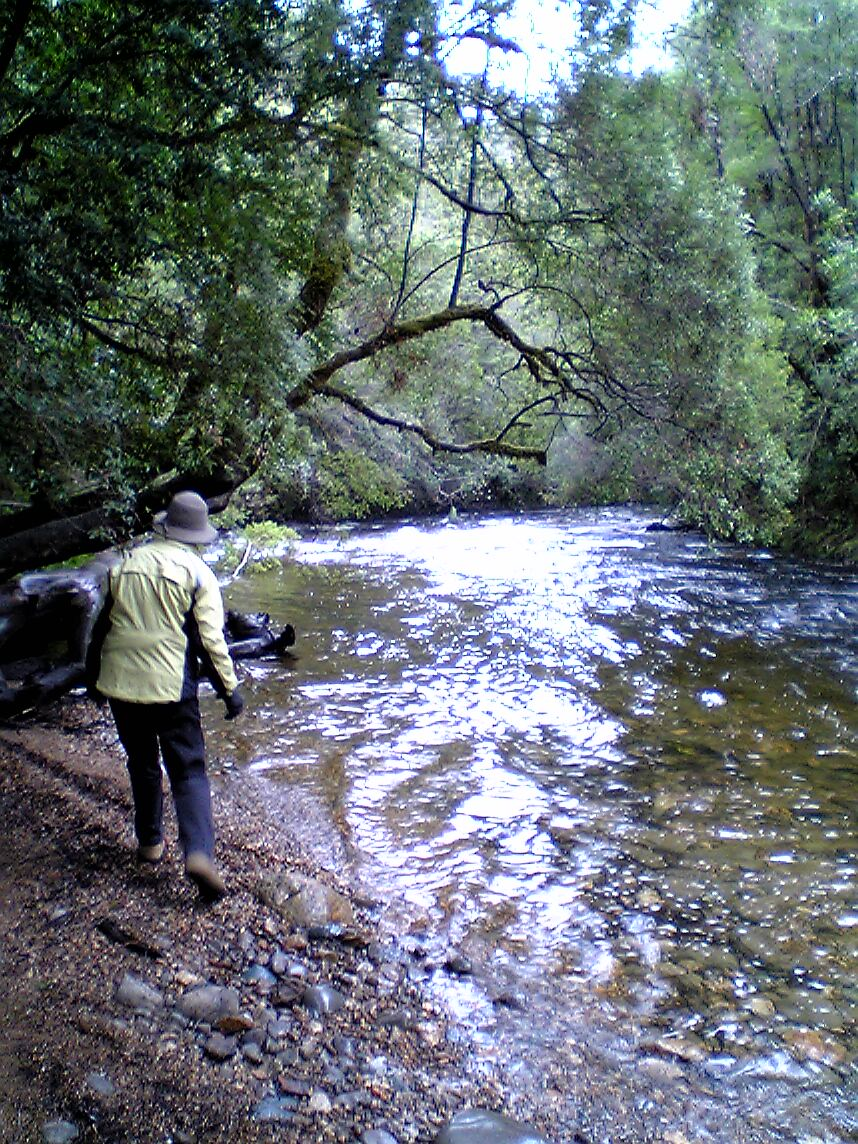
- Franklin River near the Lyell Highway

- Location of the Franklin River mouth in Tasmania
- Etymology: Sir John Franklin

Location
- Country: Australia
- State: Tasmania
- Region: Central Highlands, Western

Physical characteristics
- Source: Mount Hugel
  - location: Franklin-Gordon Wild Rivers National Park
  - coordinates: 42°18′48″S 146°12′56″E
  - elevation: 951 m (3,120 ft)
- Mouth: Gordon River
  - coordinates: 42°35′27″S 145°44′24″E
  - elevation: 11 m (36 ft)
- Length: 129 km (80 mi)

Basin features
- River system: Gordon River
- Tributaries
  - left: Surprise River, Loddon River, Jane River
  - right: Collingwood River, Lucan River, Andrew River
- Reservoirs: Lake Undine; Lake Dixon

The Franklin River is a major perennial river located in the Central Highlands and western regions of Tasmania, Australia. The river is located in the Franklin-Gordon Wild Rivers National Park at the mid northern area of the Tasmanian Wilderness World Heritage Area. Its source is situated at the western edge of the Central Highlands and it flows west towards the West Coast.

The river is named in honour of Sir John Franklin, a Governor of Tasmania, who later died searching for the Northwest Passage.

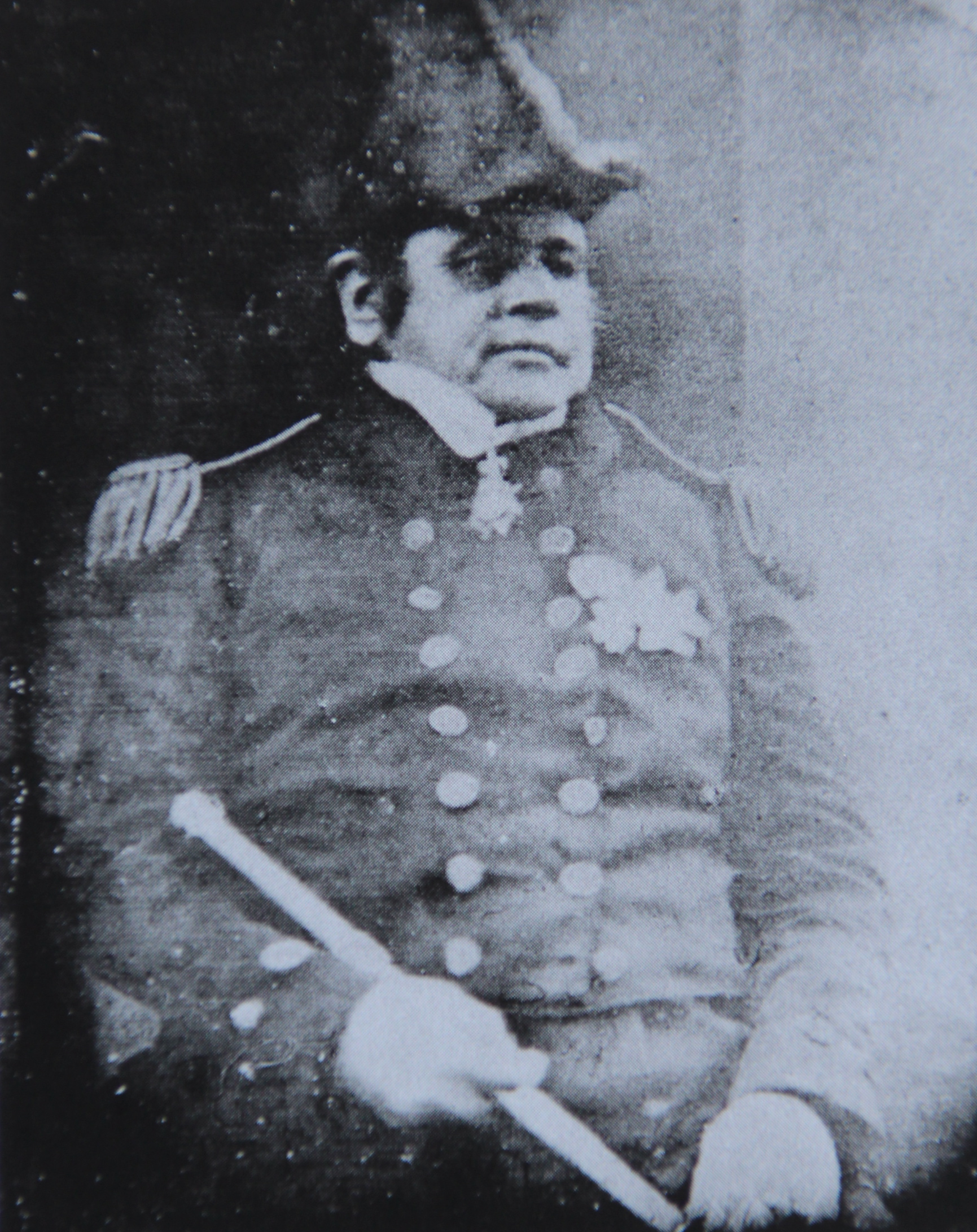
Sir John Franklin, the river's namesake.

== Location and features ==
The river rises below Mount Hugel west of Derwent Bridge on the western slopes of the Central Highlands and flows generally west and south through remote and rugged mountainous country until meeting its confluence with the Gordon River. From source to mouth the river is joined by sixteen tributaries including the Surprise, Collingwood, Lucan, Loddon, Andrew and the Jane rivers. In its upper reaches, the Franklin is impounded by two reservoirs, Lake Undine and Lake Dixon. The river is crossed by the Lyell Highway, also in its upper reaches. There are some archaeological sites that have identified pre-European activity. The upper reaches of the Franklin River were traversed by explorers in the nineteenth century, in their attempts to access Frenchmans Cap.

In the early twentieth century, access to the river was mostly pine logging in the lower reaches.

In the middle of the century, adventurous canoers sought to conquer the river's formidable challenges. The book Shooting The Franklin : Early canoeing on Tasmania's wild rivers identifies three trips in the 1950s.

=== Named places on the Franklin ===
In the case of earlier travellers, few locations of the river were named at all. During his initial journeys down the river, Bob Brown submitted names for some features. Before and since, rafters and canoers have added names for many of the bends and rapids on the river:

Location	Coordinates	Location	Coordinates
Livingstone Cut	42°20′5″S 145°47′49″E	Pig Trough	42°25′21″S 145°44′54″E
The Forceit	42°20′7″S 145°47′47″E	Rock Island Bend	42°25′22″S 145°44′58″E
Sidewinder	42°20′18″S 145°47′41″E	Shower Cliff	42°25′18″S 145°45′7″E
Thunderrush	42°20′27″S 145°47′35″E	Newland Cascades	42°25′18″S 145°45′16″E
The Sanctum	42°20′37″S 145°47′31″E	Confluence of Jane River	42°27′32″S 145°46′18″E
The Cauldron	42°20′48″S 145°47′27″E	Flat Island	42°28′21″S 145°45′37″E
Mousehole	42°21′4″S 145°47′17″E	Blackmans Bend	42°31′5″S 145°46′4″E
Deliverance Reach	42°21′4″S 145°47′6″E	Double Fall	42°31′27″S 145°45′23″E
The Biscuit	42°21′45″S 145°46′34″E	Big Fall or Devils Hole	42°33′25″S 145°45′16″E
Rafters Basin	42°21′52″S 145°46′20″E	Galleon Bluff	42°33′37″S 145°45′52″E
Confluence of Andrew River	42°21′57″S 145°46′4″E	Verandah Cliffs	42°34′16″S 145°44′59″E
Propsting Gorge	42°23′25″S 145°45′32″E	Shingle Island	42°34′59″S 145°44′40″E
Glen Calder	42°24′46″S 145°44′43″E	Pyramid Island	42°35′26″S 145°44′25″E
Gaylard Rapids	42°25′8″S 145°44′49″E	Confluence into Gordon River	42°35′27″S 145°44′24″E

== Franklin River conservation battle ==
In the 1980s, the Franklin River become synonymous with Australia's largest conservation movement of the time, the movement battled to block Hydro Tasmania's proposed hydro-electric power plan, from building on the Franklin.

The focus on the dam and the issues of wilderness experience led to the development of people utilising the river at levels never previously experienced. The result of a drowning on the river led to stricter guidelines for users of the river. Richard Flanagan's Death of a River Guide is a fictional account of a drowning, by a writer with an academic and historical understanding of the area.

== See also ==
- Commonwealth v Tasmania
