= Henty Gold Mine =

Mine in western Tasmania

Henty
- Location in Tasmania
- Location: Henty River, Tasmania, Australia; 41°52′28″S 145°33′04″E
- Production: 43,178
- Financial year: 2009–10
- Opened: 1996
- Company: Unity Mining Pty Ltd
- Website: Diversified Minerals website
- Acquired: July 2009

The Henty Gold Mine is located at the head of the Henty River on the edge of the West Coast Range in Western Tasmania. It is approximately 30 km north of Queenstown. It is east of Zeehan and south of Rosebery. It can be reached by the Hydro-built road that passes between the Henty River and Tullah.

== History ==
Operations began in the 1990s. Its orebody and viability was ascertained from earlier exploration in the area during the 1970s when the priority was for other forms of mineralization within the Mount Read Volcanic Belt.

Henty lies within the mineral rich Mt. Read Volcanic Belt in Western Tasmania that hosts the Hellyer, Que River, Rosebery, Hercules and Mount Lyell base metal deposits. The eastern side of the belt is dominated by the Henty Fault which runs north-east for over 60 kilometres between Mount Charter and Mount Read. The Henty operation is based on a series of structurally complex high-grade zones of gold mineralisation that occur within a package of highly altered volcanic rock adjacent to the Henty Fault.

The Henty Gold Mine was operated by Barrick Gold – currently the largest gold producing company in the world, which acquired the mine through the takeover of Placer Dome in 2006. The Henty mine was expected to close on or before November 2009, with subsequent rehabilitation, due to depletion of ore reserves.

Henty Gold was acquired by Bendigo Mining mid-2009. Bendigo specialise in small scale operations and expect to extend the mine's life and also own the Kangaroo Flat Mine at Bendigo. The mine continued to operate under Bendigo, producing 43,178 ounces of gold in the 2009–10 financial year, after investing A$3.8 million into mining equipment for the mine. At stages of the mine's history, environmental monitoring studies were conducted on adjacent waterways.

In January 2021, the mine was acquired by Catalyst Metals Ltd.

=== Death of mine worker ===
On 23 January 2020 a mine worker was missing underground following a fall of ground at the mine. By the next day, it was reported as unlikely that he could have survived due to the amount of rock which had fallen. The mine was still unstable so only drones had been able to explore the rockfall. On 25 January, mining services company Pybar Mining Services stated "following a site visit yesterday afternoon by the Tasmanian State Coroner and Tasmanian Police, it is with sadness that we acknowledge that the most likely outcome of our missing work colleague is that he is deceased." Police also confirmed the presumed death of 44-year-old Cameron John Goss in a statement released to media.

== Production ==
Past production figures of the mine were:

Year	Production		Grade	Cost per ounce	Notes
Year	oz	kg	Grade	Cost per ounce	Notes
2000	97,332	2,759.3	16.47 g/t	A$236	
2001	76,418	2,166.4	12.50 g/t	A$321	
2002					
2003					
2004					
2005					
2006					
2007					
2008	9,900	280			Production decreased by
2009					
2009–10	43,178	1,224.1	5.2 g/t	$890/oz	
2010-11	35,728	1,012.9	4.7 g/t	$1105/oz inclusive of royalties	
2011-12	50,058	1,419.1	5.6 g/t	$982/oz inclusive of royalties	
2012-13	43,851	1,243.2	5.3 g/t	$1114/oz inclusive of royalties	
2013-14	38,067	1,079.2	5.3 g/t	$1203/oz, including royalties of $39/oz	
2014-15	50,450	1,430	6.27 g/t	$870/oz, including royalties of $69/oz	
2016–17					
2017–18	26,191	742.5			
2017–18			est. 5.7 g/t		

== See also ==
- West Coast Tasmania Mines
