= West Coast, Tasmania =

West Coast
- Region
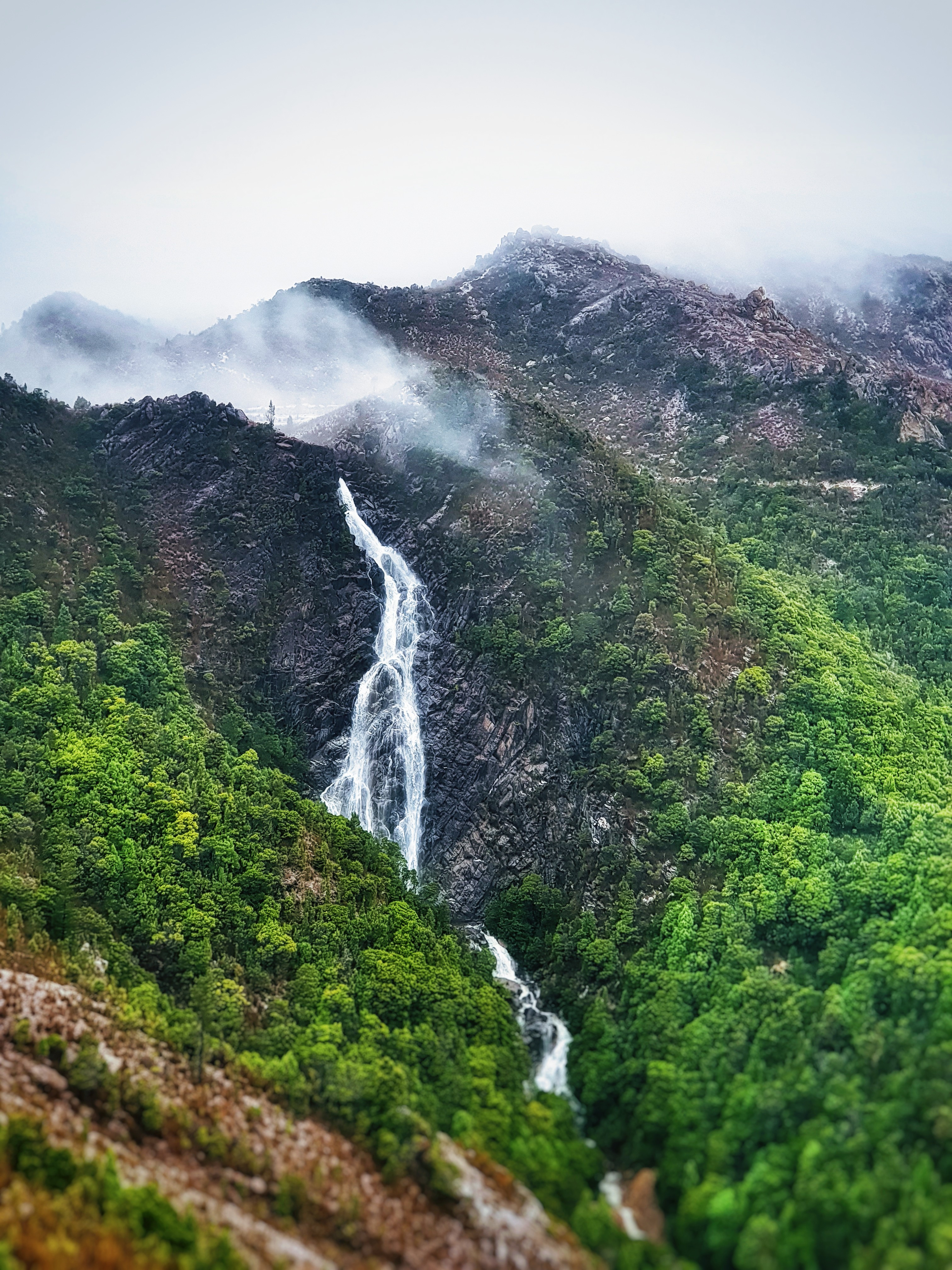
- Horsetail Falls on Mount Owen
- Country: Australia
- State: Tasmania
- LGAs: West Coast; Waratah-Wynyard

Government
  - State electorate: Braddon
  - Federal division: Braddon
Regions around West Coast
| | North West Tasmania |
| Southern Ocean | West Coast | Central Highlands |
| Southern Ocean | South West Tasmania |

The West Coast of Tasmania is one of the regions of Tasmania in Australia. It is mainly isolated rough country and is associated with wilderness, mining and tourism. It served as the location of a convict settlement in the early history of Van Diemen's Land, and contrasts sharply with the more developed and populous northern and eastern parts of the island state.

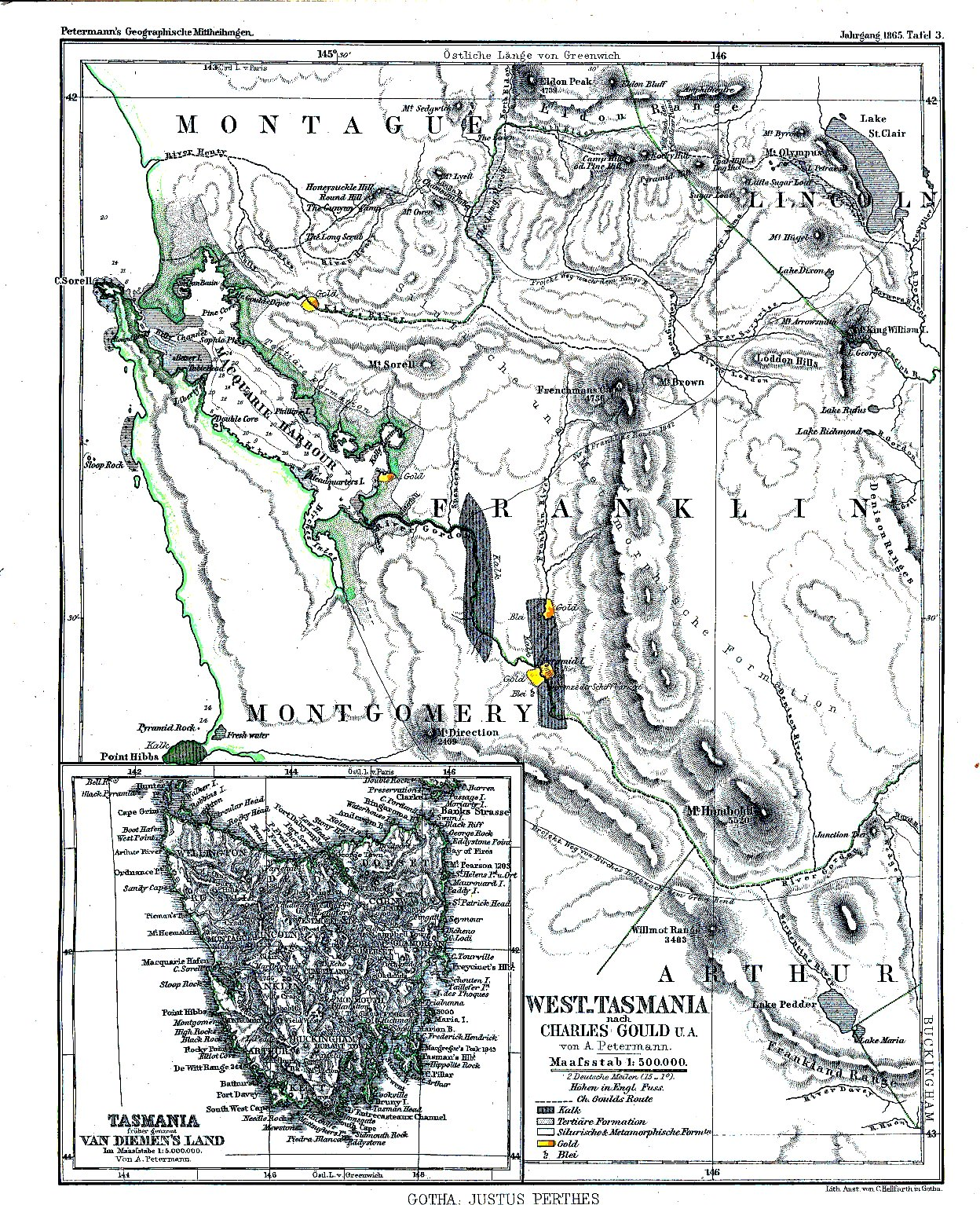
Western Tasmania and South West Tasmania with natural resources on 1865 map

== Climate ==
The west coast has a much cooler and wetter climate when compared to the east coast. Frequent low pressure systems hit the west coast causing heavy rain, snow, and ice. The West Coast Range blocks these systems from impacting the east, therefore making the West Coast a rain catchment with some areas receiving over 2,000 millimetres (79 in) of rain a year. In winter temperatures at sea level hover around 10 °C (50 °F), and when not raining, morning frost is common. The temperatures are much lower inland from the coast with maximums in winter often failing to surpass 0 °C (32 °F). Typically, the snow line in winter is around 900 metres (3000 ft), however sea level snow falls several times each winter as well. Summer is mild with maximum temperatures averaging between 17 °C (63 °F) and 21 °C (70 °F), though some days still fail to reach 10 °C (50 °F). Despite snowfall usually occurring in winter, it has been known to fall in the middle of summer.

== Transportation and economy ==
Many outsiders have had difficulty understanding the isolation of the west coast, and the small communities, and the historical context to that isolation. Initially the only way in and out was by sea, and no serviceable roads to either the north or east existed until the 1930s (east) or the 1960s (north). Railways were the main land connection from the 1920s to the 1960s - though that connection was with the north coast, rather than the more populous southeast.

The treacherous conditions at Hells Gates at the mouth of Macquarie Harbour, and ocean travel along the exposed western side of Tasmania have made marine travel a dangerous pastime even to the current day, despite modern technology. Memorial plaques to recent lost sailors on the wall at the northern edge of the Strahan wharf illustrate this.

The current airstrip is at Strahan, with the airstrip at Queenstown no longer a current registered landing ground. In the 1970s a regular service to the east coast was run by Airlines of Tasmania.

All transport services to the west coast are subject to interruption by severe weather. In addition to closures of air and marine service, the roads to the west coast may be blocked for days at a time by ice and snow during severe winter conditions.

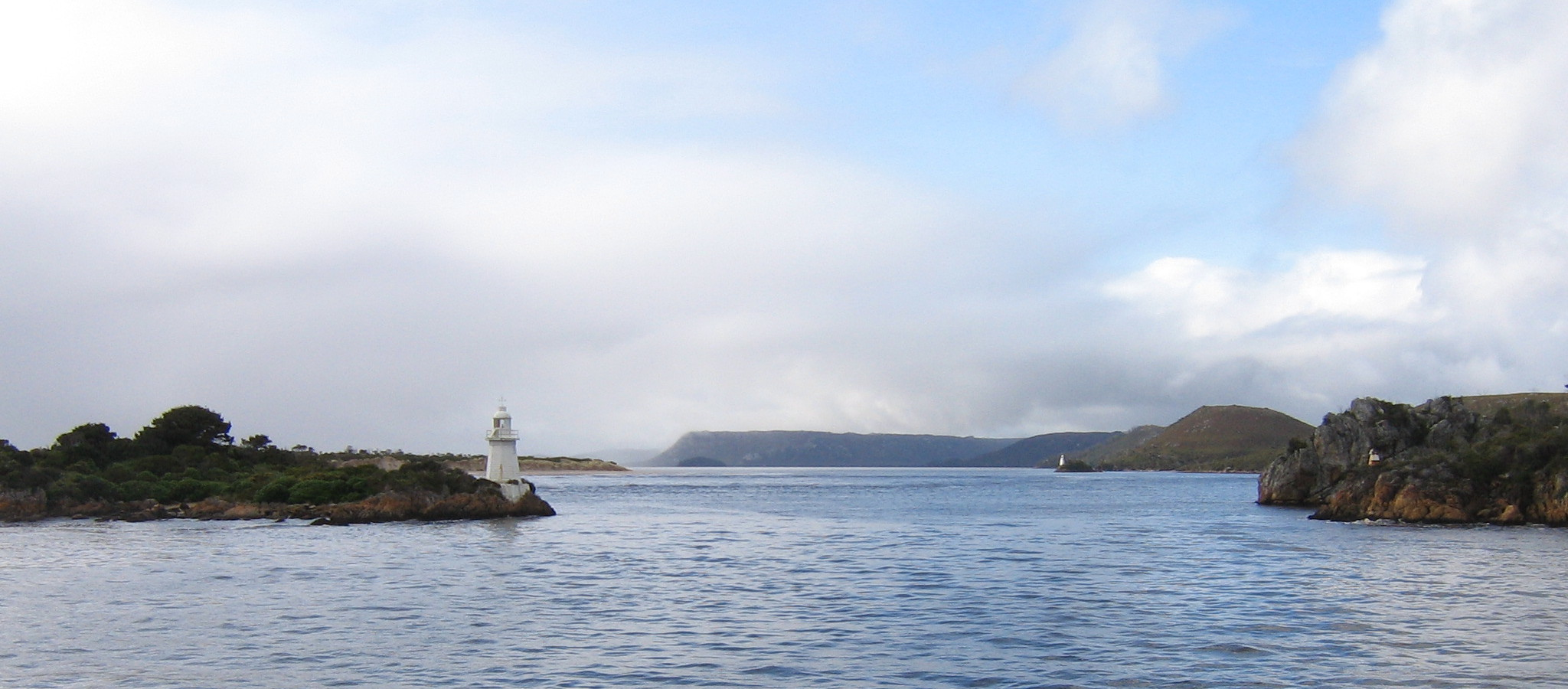
Hell's Gates, entrance to Macquarie harbour, Western Tasmania

The consequence of the isolation, and the ways that the communities coped with the difficulties, were little examined prior to the 1990s, except for parts of Tim Bowden's 1979 Radio Documentary "The West Coasters", and various references in Geoffrey Blainey's "The Peaks of Lyell" book and the important works of C.J. Binks and Kerry Pink.

Since the rise of tourism on the west coast, the Franklin Dam issue and the creation of the world heritage wilderness area, a steady number of small publications concerning the history and features of the region have been produced.

For a brief time in the early 20th century the west coast had population and political power on a parity with Hobart and Launceston. Following the demise of most of the Zeehan mines, the west coast population has either remained static, or declined relative to other parts of the island.

== The legacy ==
The environment is described with particular historical understanding by C.J. Binks in "Explorers of Western Tasmania", Chapter 2 - "A Sketch of the Western Country". (See also West Coast Range)

The convict era is introduced in articles about Macquarie Harbour Penal Station, Convicts on the West Coast of Tasmania, and Hell's Gates.

The reliance on the railways can be found in the separate article West Coast Tasmania Railways.

The mining history was captured first in Charles Whitham's Western Tasmania book - and Geoffrey Blainey's Peaks of Lyell and the books that have followed. See also the list at West Coast Tasmania Mines for a list that includes historical names and locations - many now long abandoned.

The vast tracts of forest (Huon pine, among others) in the west coast region have been subject to fire, and exploitation - as well as significant areas now under conservation. The history of the West Coast Piners who utilised the Franklin River and Gordon River and their tributaries is a vital part of west coast history.

The legacy of the Hydro Electric Commission (The Hydro) on the west coast is a complex one, due to its sense in the 1940s to 1980s considering the west and south west regions as its 'last frontier' for the remaining catchments for its power development schemes.

== Photographic record ==
As most of the European activity on the west coast (after the convict era) lies within the invention and use of the camera, most aspects of west coast history have been captured on film.

The Queen Victoria Museum and Art Gallery, and the State Library of Tasmania in Hobart are the main holdings of the record, while the late Eric Thomas's collection in the 'Galley Museum' in Queenstown is on a par with both.

Some examples of collections:

- Hurley, Frank. Tasmania, A Camera Study John Sands, 1953
- Cox, G.W. and Ratcliff, E.V.R. Tasmania Remembered ( H.J. King ) Mary Fisher Bookshop, 1974. ISBN 0-9599207-2-2
- Tassell, M. and Wood, D. Tasmanian Photographer (John Watt Beattie) Macmillan, 1981. ISBN 0-333-33737-9
- Hopkins, D.L. The Golden Years of Tasmania St David's Park, 1991. ISBN 0-7246-2536-4
- Morley, Les. The way we were The Author, 1997. Third Edition.

Due to the rise of tourism in the 1990s, a considerable number of DVDs and videos are commercially available of the region. These DVDs and videos often cover areas which had been inaccessible as recently as 30 or 40 years ago. Additionally, tourists and hikers have gathered a considerable record of the region, which regularly appears in either their own or on generally accessible websites on the Internet.

== Bioregion ==
The Tasmanian West bioregion comprises the West Coast region and the South West region.

== Locality ==
The gazetted locality/suburb named "West Coast" covers a largely uninhabited region between the Arthur River and Queenstown, and does not include the populated towns in the West Coast region. It is in the local government areas of Circular Head (34.6%), Kentish (0.3%), Waratah-Wynyard (27.1%), and West Coast (38%). Its central point is about 137 kilometres (85 mi) west of the town of Sheffield. The 2016 census has a population of nil for the state suburb of West Coast.

The Southern Ocean forms part of the western boundary. The locality encircles Corinna, Renison Bell, Rosebery and Zeehan, and is adjoined by the localities of Arthur River, Couta Rocks, Cradle Mountain, Gormanston, Granville Harbour, Guildford, Lake Margaret, Lileah, Luina, Mawbanna, Middlesex, Nelson Bay, Parrawe, Queenstown, Roger River, Savage River, Southwest, Strahan, Temma, Togari, Trial Harbour, Trowutta, Tullah, Waratah, and West Takone.

== Road infrastructure ==
The locality contains the following road routes: • A10 • B24 • B27 • B28 • C132 • C214 • C218 • C247 • C248 • C249 • C252

The A10 route (Zeehan Highway) enters from Queenstown in the south and runs generally north-west until it reaches Zeehan, where it becomes the Murchison Highway and runs north-east through Rosebery, and then turns north until it reaches the north-eastern boundary, where it exits to Guildford. At Queenstown the Lyell Highway changes from A10 to B24 and runs south and west to Strahan, following part of the southern boundary of the locality. Route B27 (Henty Road) enters from Zeehan and runs through the south-west corner to Strahan. Route B28 (Anthony Road) starts at an intersection with A10 and runs north-east to Rosebery, where it rejoins A10. Route C252 (Pieman Road) starts at an intersection with A10 on the northern boundary of Rosebery and runs west to Lake Pieman, where it ends at an intersection with C249. Route C249 enters from Zeehan as Heemskirk Road and runs north-west and north to Lake Pieman, where it becomes Corinna Road and continues north through Corinna, where it becomes Norfolk Road and continues north until it ends at an intersection with C214. Route C214 (Blackwater Road / Rebecca Road) starts at an intersection with C218 on the northern boundary and runs south and west before exiting to Couta Rocks. Route C218 (Roger River Road / Sumac Road / Rapid River Road / Tayatea Road / Trowutta Road) enters from Roger River to the north and follows a circular path through the northern part of the locality before returning to Roger River. Route C247 (an extension of Corinna Road) starts at an intersection with C249 in Corinna and runs north-east until it exits to Savage River. Route C132 (Belvoir Road) starts at an intersection with A10 and exits north-east to Guildford. Route C248 (Trial Harbour Road) starts in Zeehan and runs southwest through the locality to Trial Harbour.

== See also ==
- Railways on the West Coast of Tasmania

== Bibliography ==
- Binks, C.J. (1980). Explorers of Western Tasmania. Launceston: Mary Fisher Bookshop. ISBN 0-908291-16-7.
- Blainey, Geoffrey (2000). The Peaks of Lyell (6th ed.). Hobart: St. David's Park Publishing. ISBN 0-7246-2265-9.
- Tuma, Andrew and Bottrill, R.S.(2006) The minerals of Western Tasmania:Introduction, history and geological setting in Australian Journal of Mineralogy, volume 12, No.2, December 2006 pp. 51–58
- Whitham, Charles (2003). Western Tasmania - A land of riches and beauty (Reprint 2003 ed.). Queenstown: Municipality of Queenstown.
- Whitham, Lindsay (2002). Railways, Mines, Pubs and People and other historical research. Sandy Bay: Tasmanian Historical Research Association. ISBN 0-909479-21-6.
- Stoddart, D.Michael, ed. (1993). Walk to the West. Hobart: The Royal Society of Tasmania. ISBN 0-9598679-9-6.
