= 2 ft gauge railways in Australia =

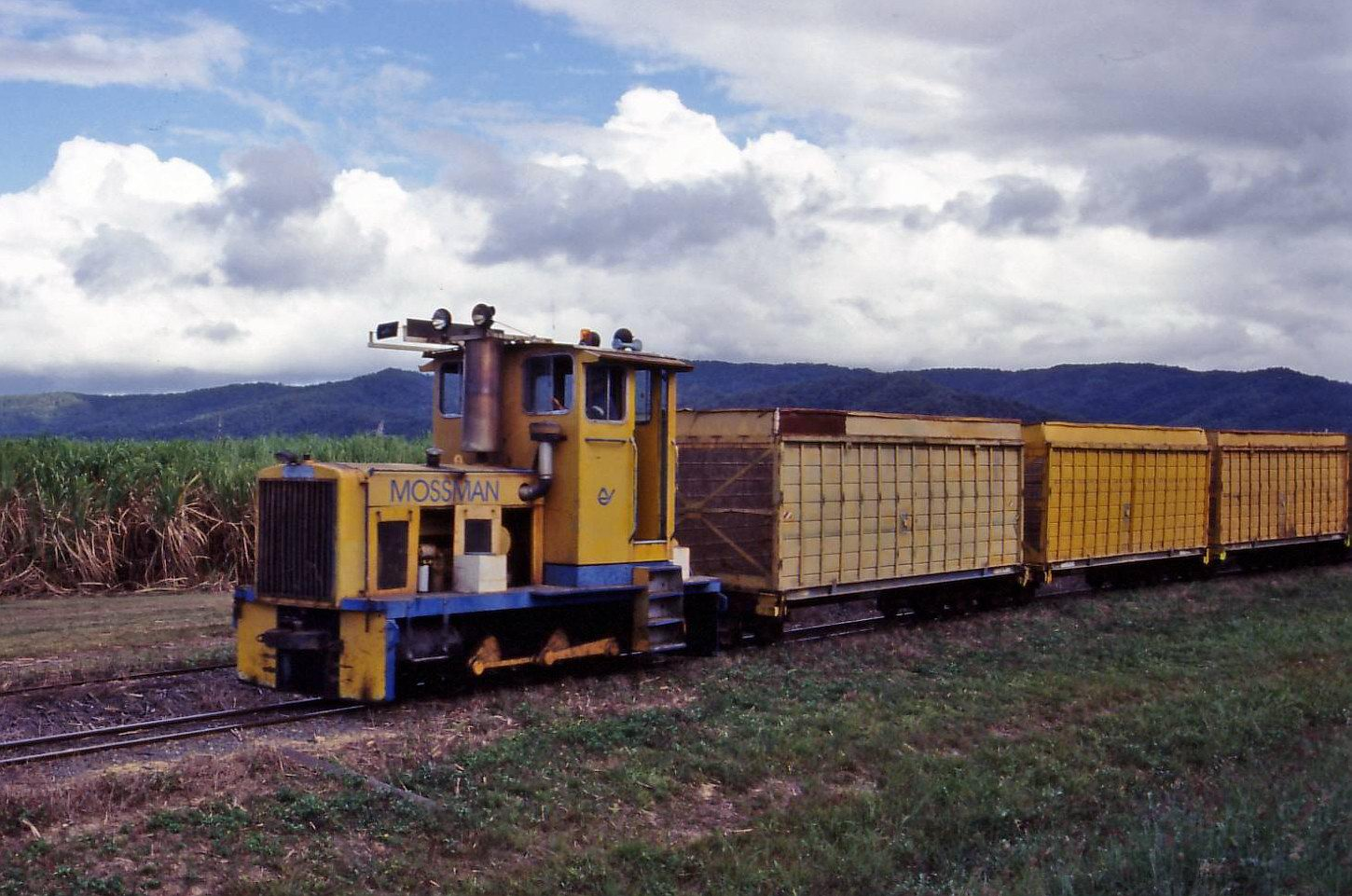
An example of a typical sugar cane railway in Queensland.

A list of 2 ft (610 mm) narrow-gauge railways in Australia.

== Installations ==
State/territory	Railway
New South Wales	Bulahdelah Logging Railway (operational status unknown); Goondah-Burrinjuck Railway (defunct); Cataract Dam construction railway; 8.8 km (5.5 mi), (defunct); Illawarra Light Railway Museum (separate 7 1/4 in (184 mm) gauge railway also present) (operating); Kiama Harbour-Pikes Hill Quarry (defunct); Marsden Weir Steam Museum (defunct); Megalong Valley Tourist Railway (defunct); Melaleuca Station, Chinderah (defunct); Menangle Narrow Gauge Railway (operating); Newington Armaments Depot (defunct); Timbertown Heritage Railway (located in Timbertown) (operating); Pete's Hobby Railway (located in Junee) (Private 2 ft gauge railway that is operating. Public admittance is not allowed under the Rail Safety National Law (NSW), No. 82a of 2012)
Queensland	Australian Sugar Cane Railway (located in Bundaberg Botanic Gardens) (operating); Ballyhooley Steam Railway (operating); Dreamworld Express (located in Dreamworld) (operating); Durundur Railway (operating); Geraldton Shire Tramway (taken over by the Innisfail and Mourilyan Tramway); Innisfail and Mourilyan Tramway (owned by Queensland Rail) (parts operating as a sugar cane tramway); Irvinebank Tramway (parts operating as a sugar cane tramway); Mapleton Tramway (parts operating as a sugar cane tramway); Mount Molloy mine and smelter; Mourilyan Harbour Tramway (taken over by the Innisfail and Mourilyan Tramway); Queensland sugar tramways (operating); Stannary Hills Tramway (taken over by the Innisfail and Mourilyan Tramway); Woodford Railway (operating)
South Australia	Cobdogla Irrigation Museum (operating)
Tasmania	Comstock Tramway, Mount Lyell (defunct); Comstock Tramway, Zeehan (defunct); Hercules Haulage (defunct); Ida Bay Railway (operating); Lake Margaret Tram (defunct); Magnet Tramway (defunct); Mount Lyell Quarry Railway (defunct); Mount Lyell Underground Railway (defunct); National Portland Cement Limited, Darlington, Maria Island (defunct); North East Dundas Tramway (defunct); Redwater Creek Steam and Heritage Society (operating); Sandfly Colliery Tramway (defunct); Wee Georgie Wood Railway (formerly known as the Mount Farrell Tramway) (operating); Zeehan & North East Dundas (defunct)
Victoria	Alexandra Timber Tramway (operating); Cheetham Salt Works (defunct); Coal Creek Bush Tramway (operating); Kerrisdale Mountain Railway (operating); Melbourne Benevolent Asylum (defunct); Red Cliffs Historical Steam Railway (operating); Rubicon Lumber and Tramway Company (defunct)
Western Australia	Bennett Brook Railway (operating); Roebourne and Cossack tramway (defunct)

== See also ==
- 2 ft and 600 mm gauge railways
- Heritage railway
- Narrow-gauge railways in Australia
- Railways on the West Coast of Tasmania
