= Railways on the West Coast of Tasmania =

Railways and tramways in Western Tasmania

The history of the railways on the West Coast of Tasmania has fascinated enthusiasts from around the world, because of the combination of the harsh terrain in which the railways were created, and the unique nature of most of the lines.

Points of note include the Mount Lyell rack railway which has an Abt rack system, the presence of the world's first Garratt locomotive and a Hagans articulated locomotive on the North East Dundas Tramway, and the collection of narrow-gauge lines as the only links to the outside world for a number of the communities for over fifty years.

The haulage railways at Mount Read, and the various ones in the area of the Mount Lyell mining lease, were also significant in their use in moving both people and metal ore. Also aerial ropeways were operating in the region well into the late twentieth century.

A number of railway lines were proposed in the late nineteenth century, and early twentieth century – but they never appeared – not all proposed lines are listed here.

The main mining towns during their boom times were connected with the outside world by railway as the main form of transport into their communities and also out to the outside world.

== Railways, tramways and haulages ==
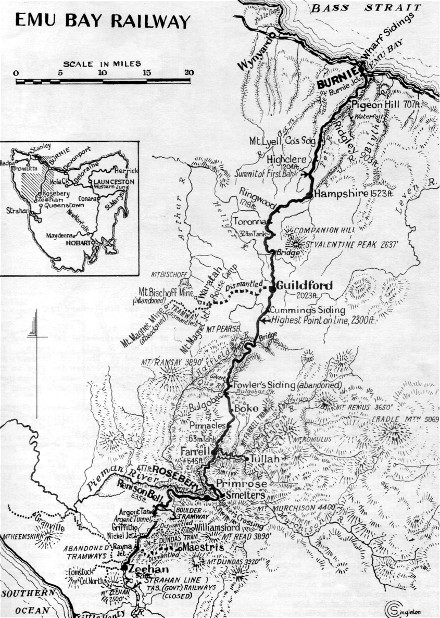
Emu Bay railway connected with most lines on the West Coast directly or indirectly

Most lines were 3 ft 6 in (1,067 mm) 2 ft (610 mm) track gauges.

See also Zeehan for tramways that centred on that location

The following list is of most of the significant named lines but it is not a complete list. There have also been haulage lines, and other tramlines within small areas that existed in mining leases and forest areas.

- Comstock Tramway, Zeehan
  - Zeehan to Comstock – 2 ft (610 mm)
- Comstock Tramway, Mount Lyell
  - Queenstown to Comstock Mine – 2 ft (610 mm)
- Emu Bay Railway
  - Burnie to Zeehan – 3 ft 6 in (1,067 mm)
- Lake Margaret Tram
  - Howards Plains to Lake Margaret power station and community – 2 ft (610 mm)
- Macquarie Heads breakwater railway
  - The main access between Cape Sorell lighthouse and the local jetty and wharf
- Magnet Tramway
  - Magnet Junction to Magnet Mine – 2 ft (610 mm)
- Mount Dundas – Zeehan Railway
  - Zeehan to Maestris 3 ft 6 in (1,067 mm)
- Mount Lyell Aerial Trams
  - Four aerial systems are shown on Mt Lyell Mining Field Map (1900–1901) in editions of The Peaks of Lyell
  - Lyell-Tharsis Aerial Tram – Lyell Tharsis Mine (just south of the North Lyell Mine) to Mt Lyell Aerial Tram
  - Mount Lyell Aerial Tram – from Mount Lyell Mine on Philosophers Ridge to Queenstown Smelters
  - North Lyell Aerial Tram – from North Lyell Tram to Linda Railway Station
- Mount Lyell Haulage
  - Located on Philosophers Ridge down to Mt Lyell smelters
- Mount Lyell Quarry Railway
  - 2 ft (610 mm)
- Mount Lyell Underground Railway (also known as the North Lyell Tunnel)
  - 2 ft
- Mount Read Haulage (also known as the Hercules Haulage)
  - Williamsford to Mount Read – 2 ft (610 mm)
- North Mount Farrell Tramway
  - Farrell Siding to Tullah – 2 ft (610 mm)
- North Mount Lyell Railway
  - Gormanston and Linda to Pillinger/Kelly Basin – 3 ft 6 in (1,067 mm)
- North Lyell Tram
  - North Lyell Mine to Mount Lyell Haulage
- North East Dundas Tramway
  - Zeehan to Williamsford – 2 ft (610 mm)
- Strahan–Zeehan Railway
  - Regatta Point to Zeehan – 3 ft 6 in (1,067 mm)
- Tasmanian Metals Extraction Company
  - Zeehan – Granville
- West Coast Wilderness Railway – Formerly Mount Lyell Railway
  - Queenstown to Regatta Point – 3 ft 6 in (1,067 mm) (Abt)
- Williamsford to Rosebery (Hercules ropeway) Aerial ropeway

== Proposed but not constructed ==
- Great Western Railway (Tasmania) discussed and spent money upon approximately in the era 1890–1908
- Chudleigh Zeehan Railway – debated in parliament in the 1890s, never commenced.

== West Coast Railways timeline ==
- 04.02.1892 Strahan to Zeehan line opened
- 25.04.1892 Zeehan to Mount Dundas line opened
- 18.03.1897 Mount Lyell line to Teepookana opened
- 01.11.1899 Mount Lyell line to Regatta Point opened
- 15.12.1900 North Mount Lyell line opened
- 21.12.1900 Emu Bay line Guildford Junction to Zeehan opened
- 23.01.1902 Magnet Tramway opened
- 26.11.1902 North Mount Farrell tramway opened
- 05.07.1932 Mount Dundas and North East Dundas lines closed
- 08.10.1933 Comstock Tram closed
- 02.06.1960 Strahan–Zeehan line closed
- 22.12.1961 Tullah Tram closed
- 10.08.1963 Mount Lyell line closed
- 27.12.2002 First day of operation of rebuilt Mount Lyell line
- 03.04.2003 Official opening of Mount Lyell line as West Coast Wilderness Railway

== Dispersal of rolling stock ==
Following closing of various lines, engines and carriages were often re-located on other working railways. Ex Mount Lyell passenger stock can be found on the Puffing Billy Railway in Victoria, while the West Coast Wilderness Railway has seen the return of reconditioned engines that used to work on the original Mount Lyell lines. A number of steam engines are held at the West Coast Pioneers Museum in Zeehan.

Following the closures of most railways in the early 1960s, rolling stock was dispersed but engines were fortuitously retained on the west coast, in most cases at the museum in Zeehan. Some of these have returned to service on the West Coast Wilderness Railway.
