= Dundas, Tasmania =

Dundas
- Town
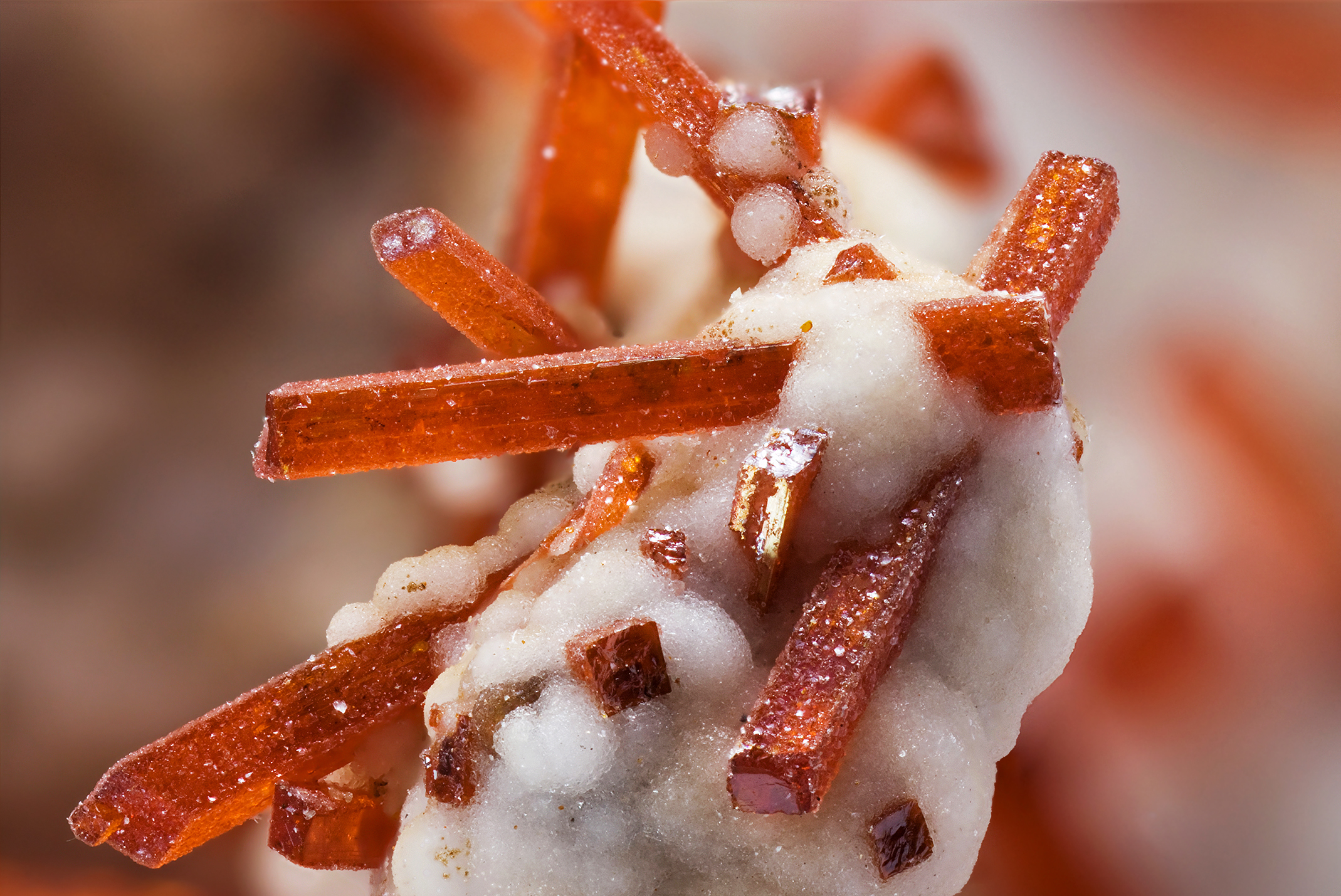
- Dundasite (white) and Crocoite (orange/red)

- Coordinates: 41°52′31″S 145°25′15″E
- Country: Australia
- State: Tasmania
- LGA: West Coast Council
- Location: 139 km (86 mi) SW of Burnie; 38 km (24 mi) NW of Queenstown

Government
  - State electorate: Braddon
  - Federal division: Braddon
- Postcode: 7469

Dundas was a historical mining locality, mineral field and railway location on the western foothills of the West Coast Range in Western Tasmania. It is now part of the locality of Zeehan.

== Location ==
The town was located 5 kilometres east of the town of Zeehan, and almost 10 kilometres west of the Mount Read township. The North East Dundas Tram branched off the Emu Bay Railway approximately 3 kilometres north east of the Dundas railway connection.

The location was hilly and heavily wooded, making the location hazardous in the event of bushfires.

The location, being close to Mount Read, was also prone to heavy rain and cold weather.

Mount Dundas Post Office was opened on 22 November 1890, renamed Dundas in 1892 and closed in 1930.

The Zeehan and Dundas Herald (1902–1922) was one of the more significant newspapers of the west coast during its operation.

== Mines and minerals ==
Silver was discovered early in the Dundas area in 1890, and the name of the Dundas field was incorporated into that of the adjacent Zeehan field.

A number of mines near Dundas are known as locations of rare minerals:

- Adelaide Mine near Dundas was the location of special specimens of crocoite, stichtite and other rare minerals.
- Comet Mine was identified as a location of anglesite, ankerite and cerussite.
- Dundasite is named after Dundas.
- Hecla Mine (also known as Hecla Curtin Mine) was identified as a location of aikinite.

== See also ==
- Mount Dundas (Tasmania)
- West Coast Tasmania Mines
- Railways on the West Coast of Tasmania
