= Macquarie Heads breakwater railway =

Former tramway near Cape Sorell, mouth of Macquarie Harbour, Western Tasmaniaq

The Macquarie Heads Breakwater was a project of the Strahan Marine Board in Western Tasmania to sustain a reasonable depth to the Hells Gates and Macquarie Heads of the Macquarie Harbour area to allow for shipping of limited tonnage to serve Regatta Point while the Mount Lyell Mining and Railway Company was exporting its mineral products by sea. The heads were notoriously difficult to navigate in good weather, and even more difficult in bad weather.

The SS Kaiwatiri was wrecked at Macquarie Heads between 1907 and 1910, and the shoal to the east of the main entrance channel is now known as the Kaiwatiri Shoal.

== Breakwater ==
The breakwater lay on the west side of the entrance. In the 1905 cartographic map of the Heads (also designated 'West Coast Entrance to Macquarie Harbour'), evidence of a proposed or planned 'East Breakwater' is shown, with the existing named as the 'West Breakwater' the name 'West Breakwater' still carried on in later surveys in 1930 and the 1964 map, but with no sign of the planned 'East Breakwater'.

The breakwater was regularly in need of maintenance The maps for Macquarie Entrance as it was also known show the breakwater's position clearly

== Horse drawn tram ==
Between 1900 and 1946 there was a horse drawn wooden rail tramline that was utilised to provide access between locations on the Cape Sorell headland between the Cape Sorell Lighthouse and the jetty and wharf locations - as well as to move rock from quarries to the construction and maintenance of the Macquarie Heads breakwater.

The named locations on the wooden rail system - were

- 0.0 - Watts Hill Quarry - operating between October 1900 and May 1927
- Pilot Beach (Bay Street) - operating between October 1900 and 1946
- 1.1 - Pilot Bay Jetty - operating between 1904 and May 1927
- 2.2 - West Breakwater Base - operating between 19 June and 1946
- 2.6 - Macquarie Heads (Langtry Street)
- 2.8 - Town Wharf
- 5.4 - Wellington Head Quarry - operating between 1904 and May 1927

== See also ==
- Railways on the West Coast of Tasmania
