= Mount Dundas to Zeehan railway line =

Former railway in Western Tasmania, Australia

The Mount Dundas – Zeehan Railway (also known as the Maestris Tram) was a railway line running 7 miles (11 km) from Dundas to Zeehan on the West Coast of Tasmania. It operated from 1892 until 1932, and the rails were removed in 1940.

== Operation ==
It was built by the Mount Dundas and Zeehan Railway Company and opened on 25 April 1892. Under an agreement signed on 4 February 1891, the Tasmanian Government Railways (TGR) operated the line.

On 28 June 1899, the Emu Bay Railway (EBR) agreed to purchase the Dundas railway, however the TGR continued to operate it.

The closure of the Silver Bell smelters in 1913 virtually ended mining in the Dundas district, leaving the railway with only a small amount of passenger and timber traffic. By 1921, Dundas had only 55 people. Between 1922 and 1924, the line carried no revenue passengers and only very small amounts of freight. By 1926, timetables merely listed stations on the line and noted that trains ran 'as required'. After a derailment in August 1931, the TGR refused to work the line. The EBR provided a locomotive to work whatever trips ran thereafter, until a stop block was placed at the junction in June 1932. The official closure date is given as 5 July 1932, after which contractors were permitted to work timber over the line by horse-power. The rails were lifted in 1940.

== Stopping places ==
As identified in 1916.

- Zeehan
- Rayna Junction – junction with the Emu Bay Railway from 21 December 1900
- Brickworks – also known as Brickfield's Siding from 1905
- Mather's
- Leslie
- Nobby's – also known as Nobby's Cutting Siding
- Brewery Junction
- Dundas – also known as Mount Dundas
- Maestris – station for the Comet Mine

== See also ==
- North East Dundas Tramway
- Railways on the West Coast of Tasmania
