= Melba railway line =

Railway line in Tasmania, Australia

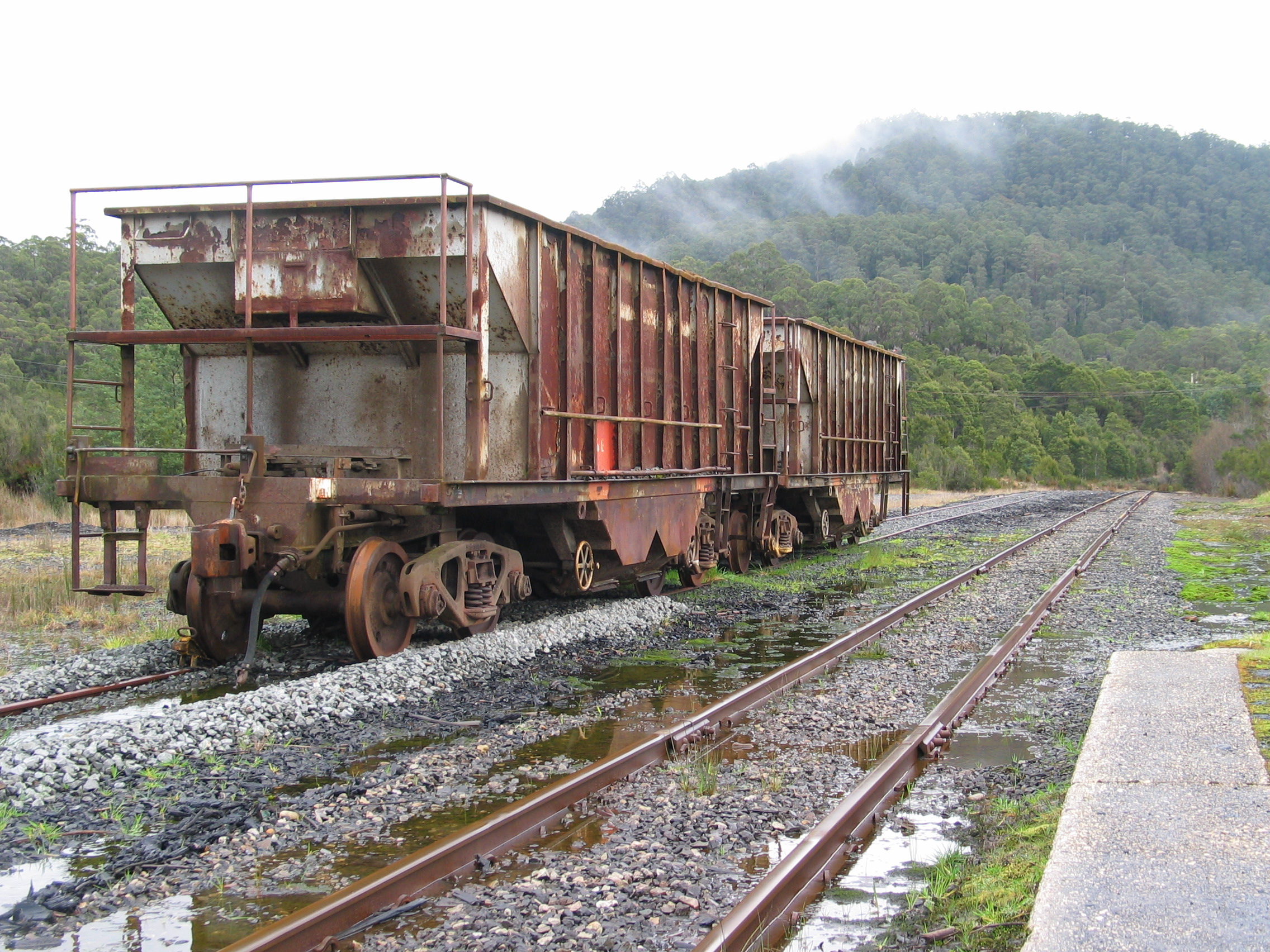
- The Melba line at Rosebery

Overview
- Status: Open
- Owner: Government of Tasmania
- Locale: West Coast, Tasmania
- Termini: Burnie; Zeehan
- Stations: 3

Service
- Type: Heavy rail
- Operator: TasRail

History
- Opened: 1 February 1878 (1st stage); 21 December 1900 (in full)

Technical
- Line length: 130 km (81 mi)
- Track gauge: 1,067 mm (3 ft 6 in) (after relaying)
- Highest elevation: 670 m (2,200 ft)

The Melba railway line is a 1,067 mm (3 ft 6 in) narrow-gauge railway on the West Coast of Tasmania. The line was originally constructed as a private railway line named the Emu Bay Railway and was one of the longest-lasting and most successful private railway companies in Australia. While at present the line travels from Burnie to Melba Flats, it previously ran through to Zeehan carrying minerals and passengers as an essential service for the West Coast community.

== History ==
In the 1870s, the Van Diemen's Land Company engaged John Climie to undertake a survey of a line from near Burnie to Mount Bischoff. On 1 February 1878, a 71 kilometres (44 mi), horse-drawn wooden tramway opened from Emu Bay (Burnie) to Rouse's Camp, near Waratah to serve the Mount Bischoff tin mines. In 1887, the line was taken over by the Emu Bay to Mount Bischoff Railway Company and relaid with steel rails as 1,067 mm (3 ft 6 in) gauge railway line to allow steam locomotives to operate. In 1897, the Emu Bay Railway took over the line, extending it 60 kilometres to Zeehan on 21 December 1900.

Following the opening of the Murchison Highway, the line was closed between Rosebery and Zeehan in August 1965. After being sold in 1967 to EZ Industries, the line was upgraded to carry heavier trains and reopened in January 1970 from Rosebery to Melba Flats. During the construction of the Pieman River hydro electric scheme in the late 1970s, the line was diverted in places and new bridges were built.

The Melba Line was included in the October 1984 sale of EZ Industries to North Broken Hill Peko, which merged with CRA Limited to form Pasminco in 1988. In 1989, an 11-kilometre branch opened from Moorey Junction to serve Aberfoyle's Hellyer Mine. On 22 May 1998, the line was sold by Pasminco to the Australian Transport Network and integrated into its Tasrail business. In February 2004, it was included in the sale of Tasrail to Pacific National, and was purchased by the newly established government-owned TasRail in September 2009.

== Stopping places ==
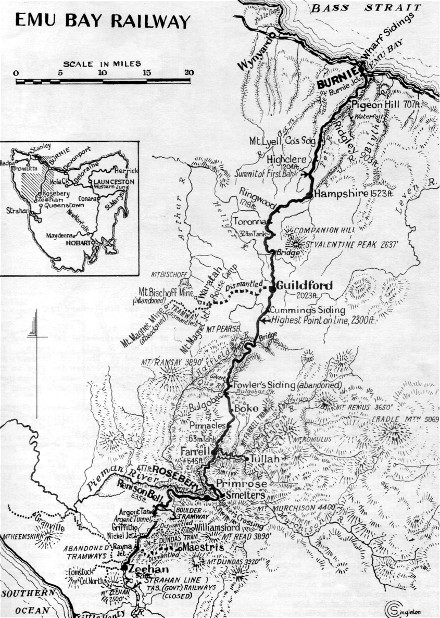
Map of the original route

At its peak as a steam operation, the railway had approximately 23 stopping or named places (including names for watering locations and other passenger operation related points) on its line and adjacent lines:

- Burnie
- Pigeon Hill
- Ridgley
- Highclere
- Hampshire
- Ringwood
- Toronna
- Wey River Bridge
- Guildford - junction to the Mount Bischoff tin mine
  - Rouse's Camp (Mount Bischoff branch line)
  - Magnet Junction (Mount Bischoff branch line)
  - Waratah (Mount Bischoff branch line)
  - Mount Magnet (Magnet Tramway)
- Muddy Creek
- Bulgobac
- Boko
- Farrell Junction with the North Mount Farrell Tramway to Tullah, now known as the Wee Georgie Wood Railway
- Primrose
- Barkers Crossing
- Rosebery
- Renison Bell
- Argent Tunnel
- Melba Flats
  - Junction with the North East Dundas Tramway to Montezuma and Williamsford on the southern slopes of Mount Read
- Rayna Junction - junction with the Maestris or Mount Dundas – Zeehan Railway
- Zeehan

Beyond Zeehan the Tasmanian Government Railways line continued to Regatta Point to connect with the Mount Lyell line to Queenstown.
