= Cape Sorell Waverider Buoy =

Swell measuring buoy on West Coast Tasmania

Coordinates: 42°12′S 145°03′E

The Cape Sorell Waverider Buoy, also named Captain Fathom by the listeners of ABC Radio, Tasmania during May 2015 to mark the centenary of the Bureau of Meteorology, is a swell-measuring buoy located west of Cape Sorell some 10 kilometres (6.2 mi) west of Ocean Beach in western Tasmania.

It is unique in that it is one of the few wave-riding swell measuring buoys close to land in the region within the Roaring Forties of the Southern Ocean apart from those in New Zealand.

Originally known as the Strahan Waverider Buoy, it was deployed in January 1998 and had recorded maximum waves of 18 metres (59 ft) within the first three months of operation. The Strahan buoy was supported by CMR, which provides the moorings, and the Strahan fishing community, which provides the resources to deploy and recover the buoy. Earlier CSIRO-funded wave-measuring buoys were installed on the area in the period 1985 to 1993, at Cape Sorell, Cape Grim and Storm Bay. The Storm Bay location concluded in December 1993. The table and graph of the range of the swells is publicly available on the internet. This data is sometimes displayed in the boats that conduct cruises across Macquarie Harbour and up Gordon River, as a means of illustrating the strength and intensity of the swells that meet Ocean Beach.

Winter swells range on average from 4 to 10 metres (13 to 33 ft). However it is claimed that the buoy broke its moorings on a 23-metre (75 ft) swell within the last decade.

The buoy retained its mooring on 21 September 2006 when it reached a peak of 19.5 metres (64 ft), which was claimed to be the highest measured wave in Australian waters. However this measurement has been modified due to the buoy's behaviour at the time, and the height is more likely to have been half that measurement.

On 16 September 2010 the swell measured up to 18.4 metres (60 ft) in extreme weather.

On 14 May 2011, further high levels were recorded, reaching 12.7 metres (42 ft).

On 10 April 2021, a wave of height of 16.6 metres (54 ft) was recorded after powerful south westerly swell reached Tasmania.

Captured research data into the record that includes this buoy is used to look at climate change.
