= Tasmanian Government Railways J class =

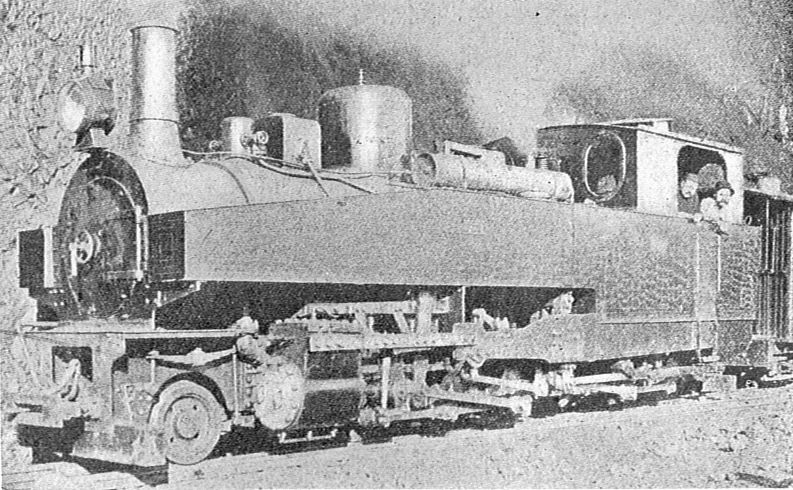
Type and origin
- Power type: Steam
- Builder: Maschinenfabrik Christian Hagans
- Serial number: 436
- Build date: 1901
- Total produced: 1
Specifications
- Configuration
  - Whyte: 2-6-4-0T
- Gauge: 2 ft (610 mm)
- Driver dia.: 2 ft 7 in (787 mm)
- Total weight: 53 long tons 0 cwt (118,700 lb or 53.9 t)
- Fuel type: Coal
- Boiler pressure: 195 lbf/in^{2} (1.34 MPa)
- Cylinder size: 15.75 in × 15.75 in (400 mm × 400 mm)
Performance figures
- Tractive effort: 23,885 lbf (106.25 kN)
Career
- Operators: Tasmanian Government Railways
- Numbers: J1
- Nicknames: Hagan's Patent
- Disposition: Scrapped

The Tasmanian Government Railways J class was a one locomotive class of 2-6-4-0T steam locomotives operated by the Tasmanian Government Railways. It was known as Hagan's Patent.

== History ==
To operate trains on the North East Dundas Tramway, the Tasmanian Government Railways purchased a locomotive from Maschinenfabrik Christian Hagans, Erfurt in 1901. The locomotive had an articulated 2-6-4-0 wheel arrangement. Its weight played havoc with the light rails it ran over and in 1910 it was replaced by the K class.
