= Bonnet Island =

Island in Tasmania, Australia

Coordinates: 42°13′S 145°13′E

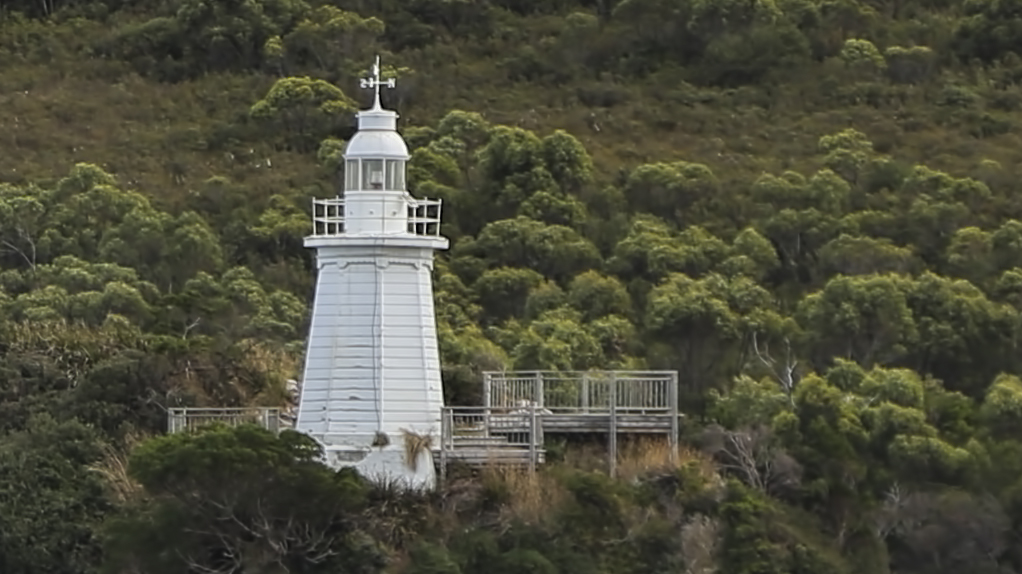
Photo of the lighthouse on Bonnet Island, Hells Gate, Tasmania

Bonnet Island is a low island with an area of 2.21 ha. It lies at the entrance to Macquarie Harbour in Western Tasmania, Australia, in the vicinity of Hells Gates. Due to its location and proximity to the entrance, it was involved as part the Macquarie Harbour Breakwater construction.

Bonnet Island has a lighthouse, which was built before the Cape Sorell Lighthouse.

Since November 2009, it has been opened up to tourists.

As one of the Macquarie Harbour islands, and in the area of the entrance to the harbour, it has been surveyed and documented regularly.

== Fauna ==
About 250 pairs of little penguin breed on the island. Other species present include the metallic skink and short-tailed shearwaters.
