= DHR D Class =

Early Garratt locomotive class

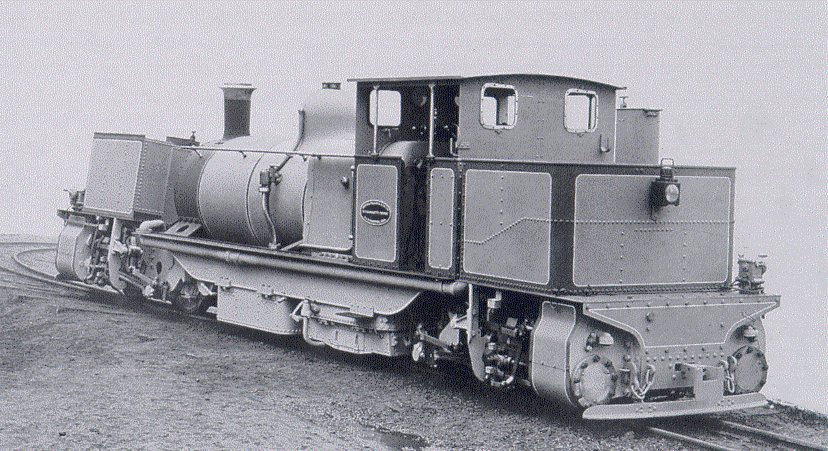
- Beyer-Peacock works photo
Type and origin
- Power type: Steam
- Builder: Beyer, Peacock & Company
Specifications
- Configuration
  - Whyte: 0-4-0+0-4-0
  - UIC: B'B' n4
- Gauge: 2 ft (610 mm)
- Driver dia.: 26 in (660 mm)
- Superheater: None
- Cylinders: Four, outside
- Cylinder size: 11 in × 14 in (279 mm × 356 mm)
Career
- Operators: Darjeeling Himalayan Railway; → Indian Railways
- Class: DHR D Class
- Number in class: 1
- Numbers: 31
- Locale: West Bengal, India
- First run: 1911
- Withdrawn: November 1954

The DHR D Class was a one-off 2 ft (610 mm) gauge 0-4-0+0-4-0 Garratt-type articulated steam locomotive used on the Darjeeling Himalayan Railway (DHR) in West Bengal, India.

== Service history ==
The sole member of the class was built by Beyer, Peacock & Company, Manchester, England in 1910, and entered service the following year, as no. 31 in the DHR fleet. Its basic dimensions were designed to be roughly equivalent to those of two of the DHR's existing B Class 0-4-0ST engines, with the intention that it would produce approximately double the power of those engines. However, in practice it was only able to haul 65% more load than a single B Class unit.

Although the DHR did not acquire any further articulated locomotives, no. 31 remained in service until November 1954.

== See also ==
- Rail transport in India#History
- Indian Railways
- Locomotives of India
- Rail transport in India
