= Melba Flats =

Railway siding in Western Tasmania

- Interactive map of Melba Flats

Location
- Location: Zeehan
- Coordinates: 41°50′52.16″S 145°24′46.55″E

Details
- Built: 1970
- Operated by: TasRail
- Type of harbour: dry port
- Rail lines: Melba
- Rail gauge: Narrow gauge
- Street access: Murchison Highway

Melba Flats is a railway siding on the Melba railway line east of Zeehan that served as a terminus for trains carrying copper ore from the Mount Lyell Mining & Railway Company in West Coast, Tasmania, once the Emu Bay Railway ceased services into the Zeehan townsite.

The section of line near Melba Flats was operational by December 1900. The Rosebery to Zeehan connection closed on the 14 August 1965, however the Rosebery to Melba Flats section re-opened on the 15 January 1970. The Mount Lyell company had trucks deliver the ore along the Queenstown to Zeehan road to this siding, until 1994.

The Melba Flats area is the site of numerous historical workings; hand workings and hand constructed mining shafts dating back to the 1880s. Lead, zinc, silver, tin and nickel have been located in varying quantities in the area.

Allegiance Mining in the 2000s investigated open pit mining of niccolite and pentlandite, copper, gold and platinum minerals from small deposits on Melba Flats.

Melba Flats loading facility is currently mothballed by its current owners TasRail. TasRail has also placed the railway line north of the Melba Flats loading facility to Rosebery into care and maintenance, till a new customer for the loading facility is found.
