= Cape Sorell =

Cape on coast of Western Tasmania, Australia

Cape Sorrell
- Cape
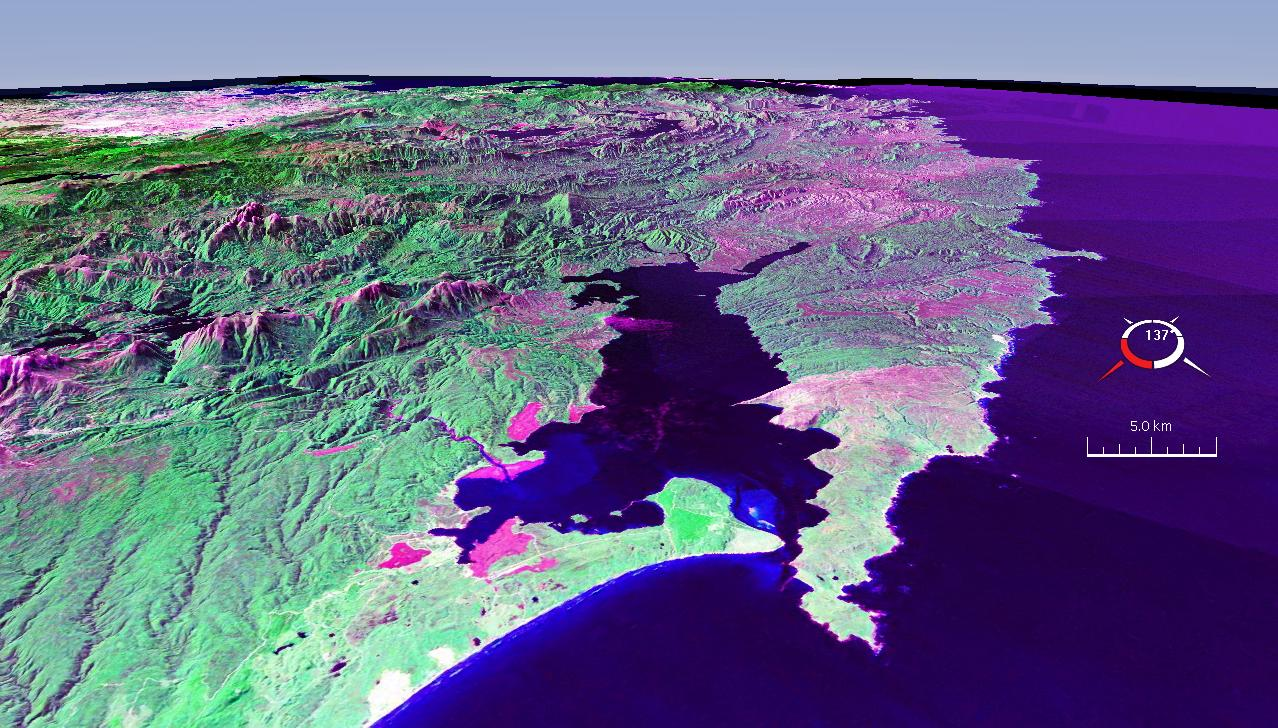
- False colour Landsat image showing Macquarie Harbour with Cape Sorell in the centre right area of the picture.

- Location in Tasmania
- Coordinates: 42°11′24″S 145°09′36″E
- Location: West Coast, Tasmania, Australia

Cape Sorell is a headland located in the Southern Ocean outside Macquarie Harbour on the West Coast of Tasmania, Australia. The cape and the Cape Sorell Lighthouse, located above the headland, are important orientation points for all vessels entering the Macquarie Heads and then through Hells Gates at the entrance to the harbour.

Cape Sorrell is named in honour of William Sorell, Lieutenant-Governor of Tasmania from 1817 to 1824.

It is a regularly cited feature of the west coast of Tasmania - for many systems as an indicator the northernmost point of the region South West Tasmania.

== Lighthouse ==
Constructed in 1899 during the rise of the West Coast mining boom, the Cape Sorell Lighthouse is a heritage-listed lighthouse located on Cape Sorell. The lighthouse is located approximately 12 kilometres (7.5 mi) southwest of Strahan.

== Macquarie Heads breakwater railway ==
Between 1900 and 1946 a horse drawn wooden rail tramline was used to provide access between the Cape Sorell headland and the Cape Sorell Lighthouse and the jetty and wharf locations. It was used to move rock from quarries for the construction and maintenance of the Macquarie Heads breakwater.

== Waverider Buoy ==
The Cape Sorell Waverider Buoy, also known as Captain Fathom as named by the listeners of ABC Radio, Tasmania during the May 2015 to mark the centenary of the Bureau of Meteorology, is a swell-measuring buoy located west of Cape Sorell some 10 kilometres (6.2 mi) west of Ocean Beach (42°12′S 145°03′E).

== Geography ==
=== Climate ===
Cape Sorell experiences an oceanic climate (Köppen: Cfb) with mild, drier summers and cool, drizzly winters. All months have recorded a maximum wind gust exceeding 100 km/h (62 mph). On average, Larapuna only has 36.4 clear days whilst having 198.0 cloudy days per annum. The wettest recorded day was 24 June 1996 with 78.0 mm (3.07 in) of rainfall. Extreme temperatures ranged from 33.5 °C (92.3 °F) on 3 February 2025 to 1.4 °C (34.5 °F) on 15 July 1966.

Climate data for Cape Sorell (42.20°S 145.17°E) (19 m (62 ft) AMSL) (1899-2025)
Month	Jan	Feb	Mar	Apr	May	Jun	Jul	Aug	Sep	Oct	Nov	Dec	Year
Record high °C (°F)	32.5 (90.5)	33.5 (92.3)	32.5 (90.5)	23.5 (74.3)	20.4 (68.7)	18.1 (64.6)	17.7 (63.9)	18.6 (65.5)	21.2 (70.2)	26.1 (79.0)	29.4 (84.9)	30.3 (86.5)	33.5 (92.3)
Mean daily maximum °C (°F)	18.5 (65.3)	18.8 (65.8)	17.8 (64.0)	15.7 (60.3)	13.8 (56.8)	12.4 (54.3)	11.9 (53.4)	12.3 (54.1)	13.3 (55.9)	14.6 (58.3)	15.7 (60.3)	17.2 (63.0)	15.2 (59.3)
Mean daily minimum °C (°F)	12.0 (53.6)	12.3 (54.1)	11.7 (53.1)	10.4 (50.7)	9.2 (48.6)	7.7 (45.9)	7.2 (45.0)	7.4 (45.3)	8.0 (46.4)	8.7 (47.7)	9.7 (49.5)	11.0 (51.8)	9.6 (49.3)
Record low °C (°F)	6.1 (43.0)	5.1 (41.2)	6.1 (43.0)	3.9 (39.0)	1.7 (35.1)	1.7 (35.1)	1.4 (34.5)	1.6 (34.9)	2.3 (36.1)	2.2 (36.0)	4.5 (40.1)	5.2 (41.4)	1.4 (34.5)
Average precipitation mm (inches)	66.4 (2.61)	64.9 (2.56)	81.7 (3.22)	105.0 (4.13)	128.9 (5.07)	138.8 (5.46)	152.7 (6.01)	147.9 (5.82)	118.0 (4.65)	105.4 (4.15)	86.5 (3.41)	79.4 (3.13)	1,274.1 (50.16)
Average precipitation days (≥ 0.2 mm)	14.8	13.4	17.0	19.6	22.4	21.6	23.4	23.9	22.0	21.3	18.5	17.4	235.3
Average afternoon relative humidity (%)	76	78	78	81	83	82	82	80	79	78	78	77	79
Average dew point °C (°F)	13.4 (56.1)	13.6 (56.5)	12.7 (54.9)	11.6 (52.9)	10.0 (50.0)	9.2 (48.6)	8.5 (47.3)	8.7 (47.7)	9.1 (48.4)	10.0 (50.0)	11.0 (51.8)	12.6 (54.7)	10.9 (51.6)
Source: Bureau of Meteorology (1899-2025)

== See also ==
- Geography of Tasmania
