= Zeehan to Strahan railway line =

Railway line in Western Tasmania

Strahan–Zeehan Railway

Overview
- Termini: Zeehan, Tasmania; Regatta Point, Tasmania

History
- Opened: 1892
- Closed: 1960

Technical
- Line length: 51 km (32 mi)
- Track gauge: 3 ft 6 in (1,067 mm)

The Strahan–Zeehan Railway, also known as the "Government Railway", was a railway from Strahan to Zeehan on the west coast of Tasmania.

It linked two private railways: the Mount Lyell Mining and Railway Company railway line (now known as the West Coast Wilderness Railway) between Queenstown and Regatta Point, and the Emu Bay Railway between Zeehan and Burnie.

Early photographs of the Strahan wharf and buildings adjacent taken from the north usually have the railway tracks in the lower section of the photograph, as the line followed the shore from Regatta Point around the bay before passing northward in what is considered to be West Strahan today.

The line ran parallel to Ocean Beach before heading towards Zeehan.

It was a critical link, due to the difficulties of shipping negotiating the entrance to Macquarie Harbour and was essential during the 1912 North Mount Lyell disaster. The track gauge of the lines between Burnie was the same all the way to Queenstown.

Flooding and fire affected the most important link, the Henty Bridge, at stages in the line's history. 1920 was one year where the break in the line is recorded.

The line was heavily reliant upon the mining industry and its fortunes, and traffic reduced drastically at times of mining down-turns.

Following its closure, parts became tracks and eventually the formation was made into the Zeehan-Strahan Road.

== Dates ==
The line was opened on 4 February 1892, and it was closed 2 June 1960.

== Stations and stopping places ==
- Zeehan
- Silver Bell
- Austral
- Oceana Junction
- Professor
- Grieves Siding
- Eden
- Powell's Siding
- Mallana—renamed Fowler's Siding
- Henty Bridge—renamed Koyule (1926)
- Henty
- Beach Road—also known as Ocean Beach
- Bellinger
- Opah—renamed Stella (1903)
- West Strahan
- Strahan Wharf
- Regatta Point

== See also ==
- Railways on the West Coast of Tasmania
