= Iron Blow =

Mine in Tasmania, Australia

Coordinates: 42°4′6″S 145°35′26″E

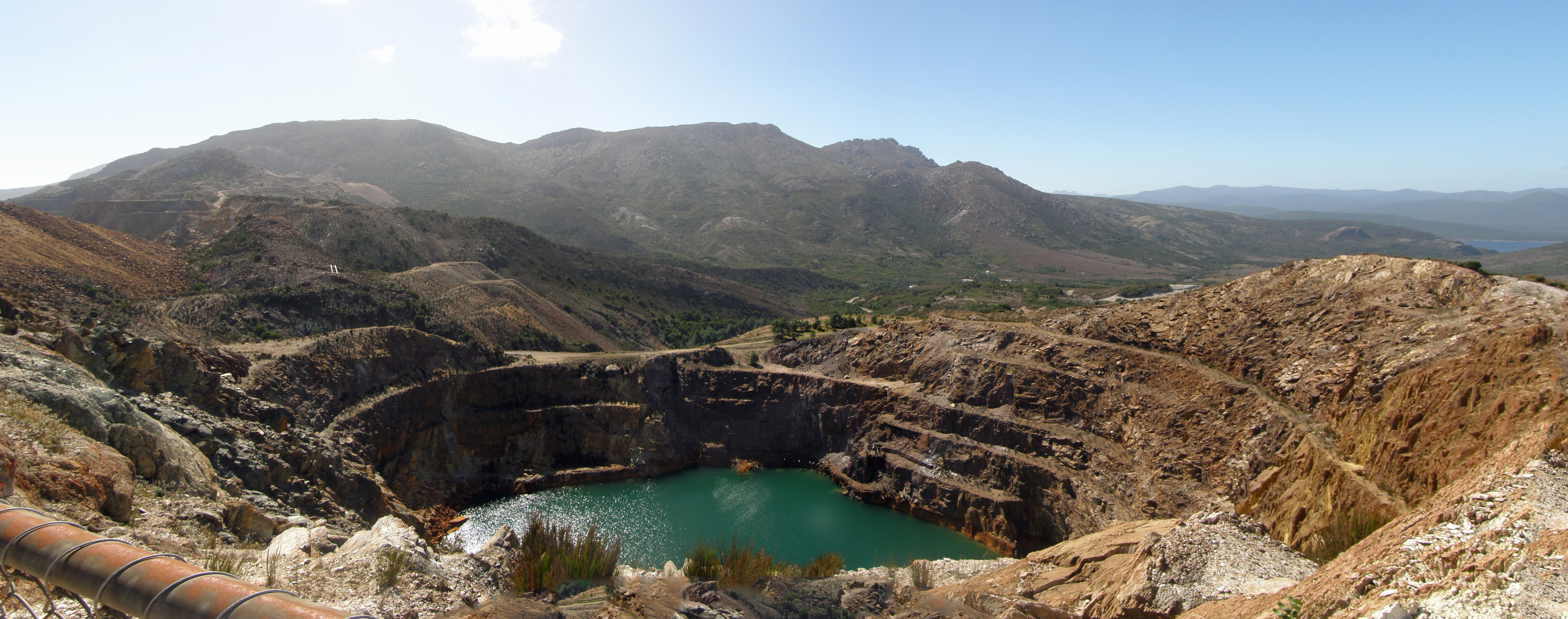
Iron Blow in 2009

Iron Blow was the site of the earliest major mining venture at Mount Lyell on the west coast of Tasmania, Australia in 1883.

== Original form ==
Geoffrey Blainey describes the appearance prior to its being mined:

They (Those mentioned above) examined the strange formation. It jutted twenty or thirty feet above the surface and was split by deep cracks and crevices as if a great explosion had fractured the rock and flung slabs far down the hill...(they)... had seen no similar outcrop in their brief mining experience. What lay beneath the ironstone crust?

== Mining ==
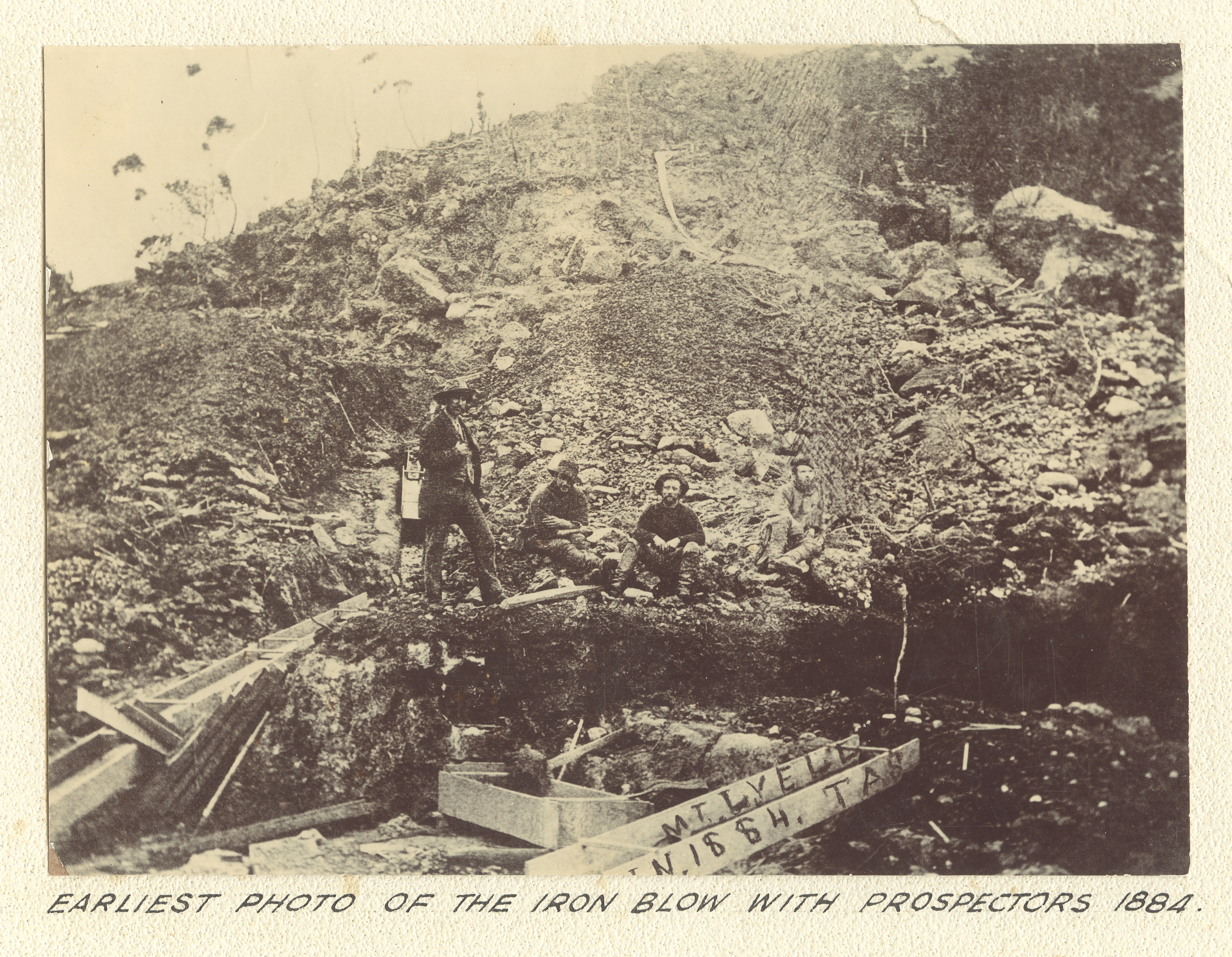
early stages of working the Iron Blow in 1884

The first shot on the site was in January 1884 - and most local prospectors were camped in the Linda Valley to the east of the Mount Owen - Mount Lyell ridge - also known as Philosophers Ridge

The townsite of Penghana, the present site of Queenstown - to the west was still thick rainforest.

Following the establishment of the Mount Lyell Mining and Railway Company in 1893, the Iron Blow orebody was mined until 1929.

== Haulage ==
The transport of ore from the Iron Blow down to the operations area of the mine linking to the railway, was by the commonly known Haulage, although more technical terms included Self Acting Haulage.

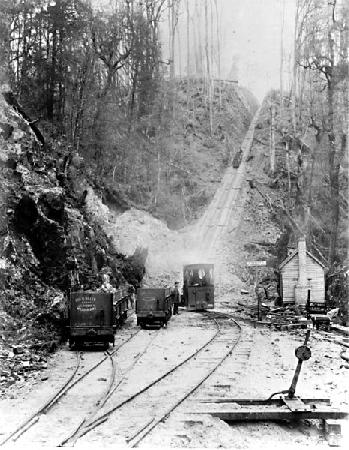
Foot of the Haulage line in early 1890s

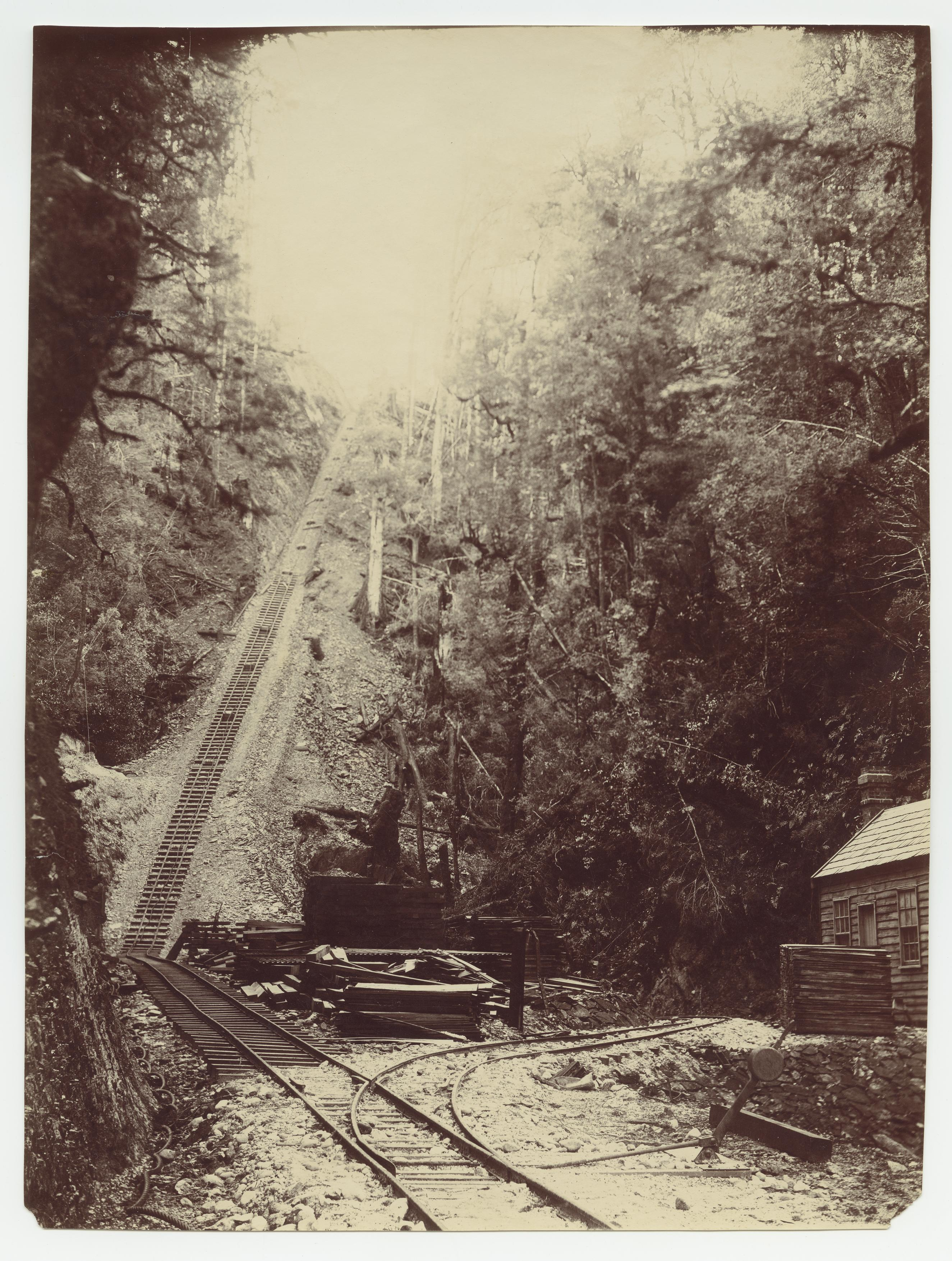
Foot of the Haulage line in the 1895

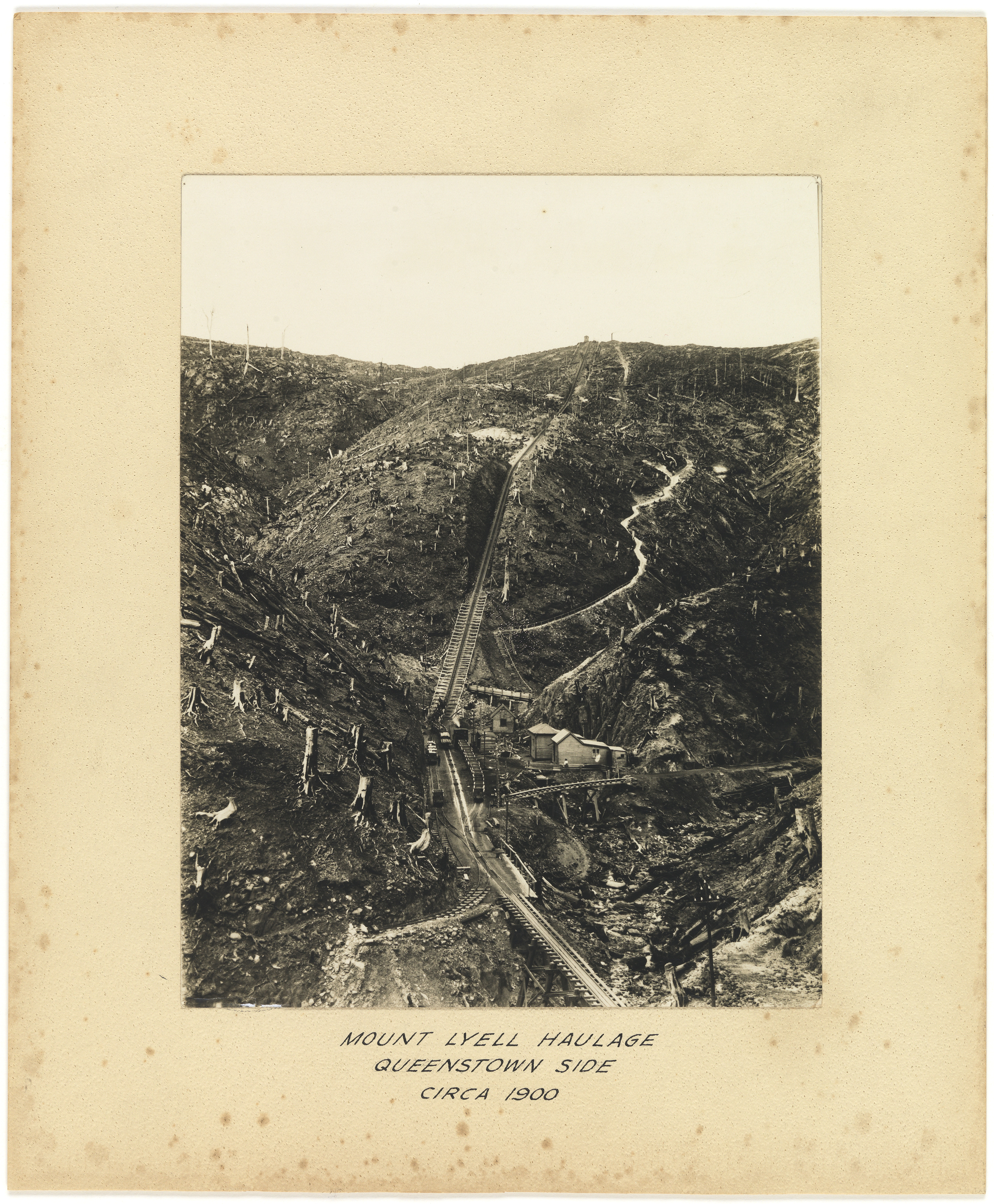
Foot of the Haulage line by 1900 with denuded landscape showing

== End of the era ==
The cessation of the Iron Blow mining was also linked in with the demise of the Mount Lyell pyritic smelting - the cessation of Robert Carl Sticht's smelters and methods.

The development of the West Lyell Open cut, and the later development of the Prince Lyell ore bodies removed all vestiges of the original workings.

== See also ==
- Copper extraction techniques
- West Coast Tasmania Mines
