= Dundasite =

Lead aluminium carbonate mineral

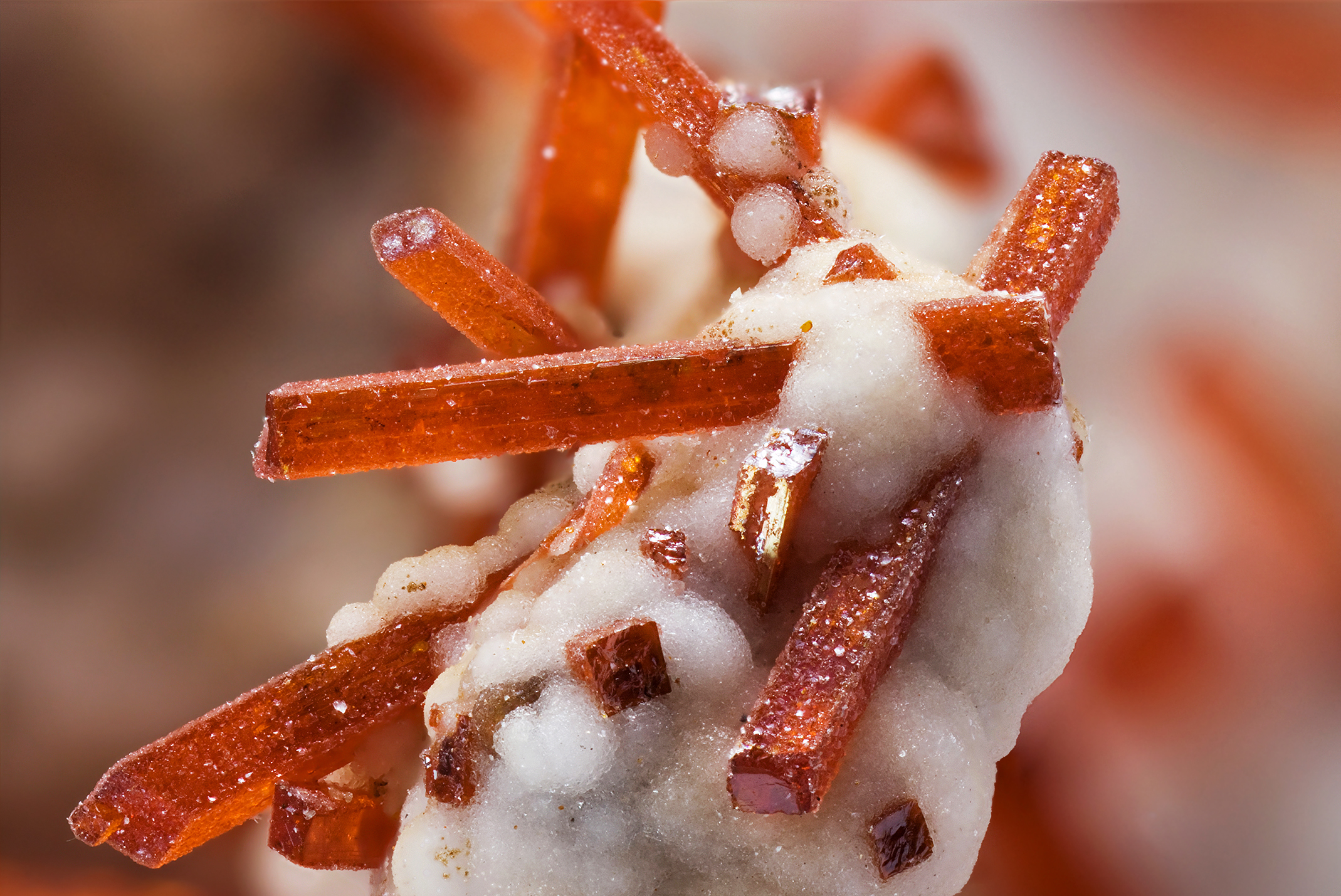
- Dundasite (the white mineral) and crocoite from Dundas, Tasmania. Field of view is 5mm.

General
- Category: Carbonate mineral
- Formula: PbAl_{2}[(OH)_{2}|CO_{3}]_{2} • H_{2}O
- IMA symbol: Dun
- Strunz classification: 5.DB.10
- Crystal system: Orthorhombic
- Crystal class: Dipyramidal (mmm); H-M symbol: (2/m 2/m 2/m)
- Space group: Pbmm (no. 51)
- Unit cell: a = 9.08, b = 16.37 c = 5.62 [Å]; Z = 4

Identification
- Color: White to very pale blue; colorless in transmitted light
- Crystal habit: Acicular crystals typically in spherical aggregates and matted crusts
- Cleavage: Perfect On {010}
- Mohs scale hardness: 2
- Luster: Vitreous to silky
- Streak: White
- Diaphaneity: Transparent
- Specific gravity: 3.10 – 3.55
- Optical properties: Biaxial (-)
- Refractive index: n_{α} = 1.603 n_{β} = 1.716 n_{γ} = 1.750
- Birefringence: δ = 0.147
- 2V angle: Measured: 30° to 40°, calculated: 54°

Dundasite is a rare lead aluminium carbonate mineral. The mineral is named after the type locality, Dundas, Tasmania, Australia. The mineral was first discovered in the Adelaide Proprietary Mine. Dundasite was first described by William Frederick Petterd in 1893.

Dundasite is an uncommon secondary mineral occurring in the oxidized zone of lead ore deposits. It commonly overgrows crocoite. It may also be overgrown by yellow cerussite. It may be associated with cerussite, plattnerite, azurite, malachite, pyromorphite, mimetite, beudantite, duftite, crocoite, gibbsite, allophane and limonite.

Besides its type location on Tasmania, the mineral has also been found in New Zealand, Mainland Australia, China, Belgium, Germany, France, Greece, United Kingdom, Ireland, Italy, Austria, Czech Republic, Namibia, and the US.
