= Tasmanian Government Railways G class =

Class of Australian locomotives

Type and origin
- Power type: Steam
- Builder: Sharp, Stewart & Company
- Build date: 1896-1900
- Total produced: 3
Specifications
- Configuration
  - Whyte: 0-4-2T
- Gauge: 2 ft (610 mm)
- Driver dia.: 2 ft 6 in (762 mm)
- Loco weight: 19 long tons 75 cwt (51,000 lb or 23.1 t)
- Fuel type: Coal
- Boiler pressure: 140 lbf/in^{2} (0.97 MPa; 140.00 psi); 145 lbf/in^{2} (1.00 MPa; 145.00 psi)
- Cylinder size: 12 in × 16 in 305 mm × 406 mm
Performance figures
- Tractive effort: 8,601 lbf (38.26 kN)
Career
- Operators: Tasmanian Government Railways
- Numbers: G1-G2
- Withdrawn: 1962
- Disposition: All scrapped

The Tasmanian Government Railways G class was a class of 0-4-2T steam locomotives operated by the Tasmanian Government Railways.

== History ==
In 1896, the Tasmanian Government Railways purchased two 0-4-2T steam locomotives from Sharp, Stewart & Company, Glasgow to operate the North East Dundas Tramway. Shortly after entering service, G1 was destroyed on 17 May 1897 after the boiler exploded. The crew were killed and the boiler flung 30 metres into the air landing 230 metres away. A replacement arrived in 1900, assuming G1's identity. After the railway closed, both were sold to the Isis Sugar Mill in Cordalba, Queensland and converted to tender locomotives.

G1 ended up in a Childers service station, but has since disappeared, while G2 was sold for use at a planned Sydney theme park, but illegally cut up at St Marys in 1991.

Builder's number	Built	TGR no	Isis no	Isis name
4198	1896	G1		
4432	1898	G2	10	Tassie B
4619	1900	G1	9	Tassie A

== Namesake ==
The G class designation was reused for the Australian Standard Garratt locomotives in the 1940s.
