= Ocean Beach (Tasmania) =

- Coordinates: 42.069°S 145.254°E
- Country: Australia
- State: Tasmania

Ocean Beach is a long stretch of beach running north of Macquarie Heads and Hells Gates on the West Coast of Tasmania. It is close to Strahan and parallel to the Strahan Airport runway. It extends as far north as Trial Harbour and the coast immediately west of Zeehan.

Exposed to the ocean with no landmass at this longitude between it and South America, this beach can be exposed to extreme weather conditions. In serious weather it can have large extended lines of breakers, and a swell at the Cape Sorell Waverider Buoy at up to 20+ metres.

In the 1940s the beach area was utilised by local gliding and soaring club members

Whale stranding frequently occurs along this stretch of the West Coast—and can be difficult to remedy due to the isolated location and low population numbers to assist in whale rescue.

It was also the name of a stopping place on the Strahan–Zeehan Railway which was on a part of the railway line where shifting sand dunes often affected the track.
