= Great Western Railway (Tasmania) =

Proposed railway in Tasmania, Australia

The Tasmanian Great Western Railway was a proposed railway that was never built to connect Hobart with the west coast during the 1890s mining boom in Tasmania. It would have passed through a route somewhat similar to the current Lyell Highway through the northern edge of South West Tasmania into the west coast.

It was a proposal by business interests to use Hobart on the east coast, rather than the west or north west coast ports. However the proposal was not a simple idea that failed – but a play between rival companies and regions:

In 1896 two rival companies lobbied for permission to build railways from Hobart to the west. The Great Western Railway Company, promoted in Melbourne, planned an electric railway from Glenora to Mount Lyell and Zeehan.... The theoretical plans of the rival syndicates passed as genuine currency in Hobart, where the Mercury printed a huge red and black map

Capital was raised in 1899. Initial surveys and appraisals of the route were made in 1900. By 1903 there were reports that the proposal was "doomed".

The Great Western railway proposal was part of a complex play of political and business interests between the three regions of power in Tasmania that were relatively balanced in the 1890s through to the time of the First World War – after which the distribution was never balanced again. The solution of the North West Route to Burnie and the rise of the Mount Lyell Mining and Railway Company and Emu Bay Railway routes saw the Great Western Railway proposals vanish in time.

== See also ==
- Railways on the West Coast of Tasmania
