= Hells Gates (Tasmania) =

Entrance to Macquarie Harbour, Western Tasmania

Coordinates: 42°13′9″S 145°13′12″E

Hells Gates is the name of the mouth of Macquarie Harbour on the West Coast of Tasmania, Australia.

It is a notoriously shallow and dangerous channel entrance to the harbour. The actual channel is between Macquarie Heads on the west and Entrance Island on the east (the main length of the harbour runs southeast of Hells Gates). There is a wider area of water between Entrance Island and the eastern shore, but it is too shallow to get a boat over.

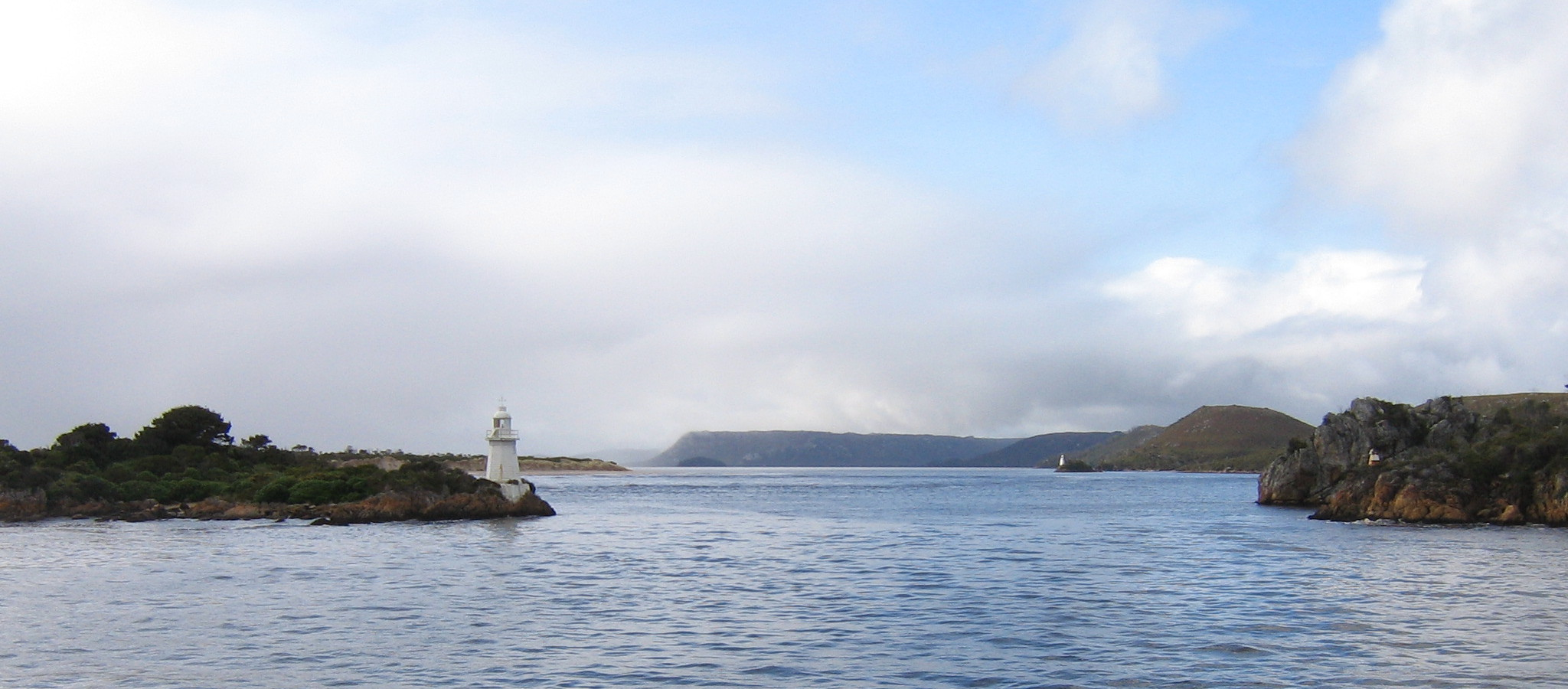
Hells Gates, viewed from the ocean side of the entrance. Entrance Island is on the left. Bonnet Island lighthouse is visible in the distance.

Braddon Point is the name of the feature on the eastern shore, while the shallow water south of the point is named Fraser Flats, and the channel adjacent to the breakwater is known as Kelly Channel.

== Name origins ==
The name of the channel relates to the original convicts' claim that it was their point of "entrance to Hell", their Hell being the Macquarie Harbour Penal Station on Sarah Island and the outlying surrounds of the harbour.

== Breakwater and channel ==
Between 1900 and 1902 the Macquarie Harbour Entrance Works involved the building of a breakwater and the channel was dredged. Parts of the breakwater can still be seen despite the passage of time. The Strahan Marine Board was involved with the monitoring of the mouth until 19 May 1970, when the Hobart Marine Board took over.

== Lighthouses ==
Both Entrance and Bonnet Islands have lights, and they were built before the Cape Sorell Lighthouse.

== Charts and maps ==
Due to the precarious entrance, and the changes in the hydrology of the area, charts and maps were updated regularly while Strahan was a port of importance – some of these maps are now available online.

== See also ==
- Cape Sorell, Tasmania
- Convicts on the West Coast of Tasmania
