= Comstock Tram =

Three tramways in Tasmania

Comstock Tram refers to three different tramways in the West Coast Tasmania, Australia

== Zeehan ==
The Zeehan Comstock Tram – at Zeehan that ran between Zeehan railway station and Comstock south of the Trial Harbour Road. Originally known as Grubb's Tramway and later Col North line, it was rebuilt by the Tasmanian Government Railways and opened on 6 March 1902.

== Mount Lyell – western side ==
The Mount Lyell Comstock Tram – at Mount Lyell was a tramway from the main area of the Mount Lyell mine works, up the west side of Mount Lyell to the Comstock mine.

== Mount Lyell – southern, eastern and northern side ==
The never completed Comstock Tram formation cut around the perimeter of Mount Lyell between North Lyell and Comstock on the northern side.
