= Tasmanian Government Railways K class =

Class of Garratt locomotives

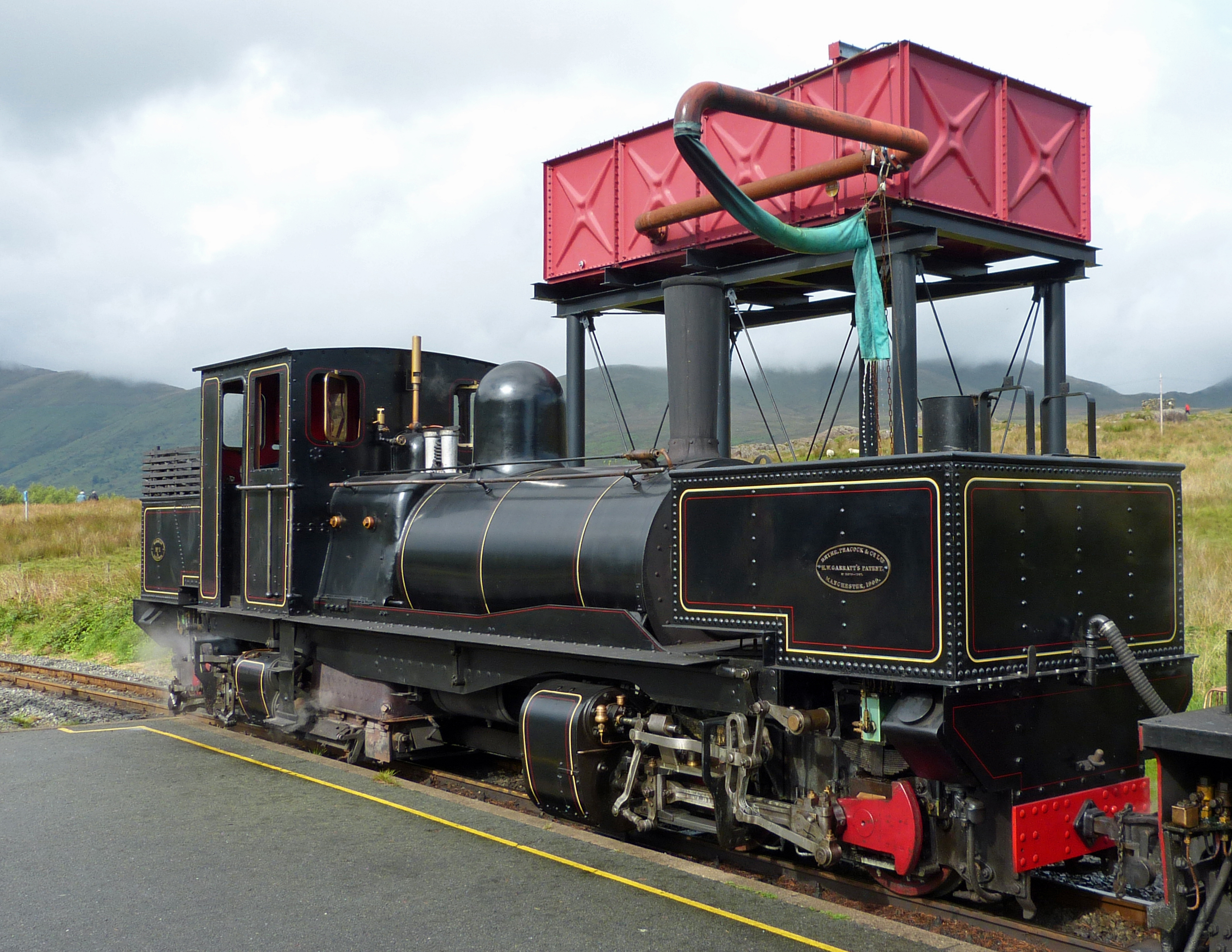
- K1 at Rhyd Ddu station in September 2013
Type and origin
- Power type: Steam
- Builder: Beyer, Peacock & Company
- Serial number: 5292, 5293
- Build date: 1909
- Total produced: 2
Specifications
- Configuration
  - Whyte: 0-4-0+0-4-0T
- Gauge: 2 ft (610 mm)
- Driver dia.: 2 ft 7 1/2 in (800 mm)
- Wheelbase: 4 ft (1,219 mm) (bogies); 26 ft 9 in (8,153 mm) (overall)
- Length: 32 ft 2 in (9,800 mm)
- Loco weight: 33.5 long tons (34.0 t; 37.5 short tons)
- Fuel type: Coal; Oil
- Tender cap.: 840 imp gal (3,800 L; 1,010 US gal)
- Firebox
  - Grate area: 14.8 sq ft (1.37 m^{2})
- Boiler pressure: 195 psi (13.4 bar; 1,340 kPa)
- Heating surface
  - Firebox: 60 sq ft (5.6 m^{2})
  - Tubes: 568 sq ft (52.8 m^{2})
  - Total surface: 628 sq ft (58.3 m^{2})
- Cylinder size: 14.5 in × 20 in (368 mm × 508 mm)
- High-pressure cylinder: 11 in × 16 in (279 mm × 406 mm)
- Low-pressure cylinder: 17 in × 16 in (432 mm × 406 mm)
- Valve gear: Walschaerts
Performance figures
- Tractive effort: 12,507 lbf (55.63 kN)
Career
- Operators: Tasmanian Government Railways
- Numbers: K1-K2
- Preserved: K1
- Disposition: 1 preserved, 1 scrapped

The Tasmanian Government Railways K class is a class of 2 0-4-0+0-4-0 Garratt locomotives operated by the Tasmanian Government Railways from 1909. They were the first Garratt locomotives built.

== Overview ==
Although considered the first Garratt locomotives, they did in fact differ in two important details from Herbert William Garratt's original concept. First: they are compound locomotives, with two high-pressure cylinders on the rear engine, and a pipe leading to two larger low-pressure cylinders on the front engine; second: both sets of cylinders were placed facing each other inside their engine units, rather than facing out as in all other Garratts. This was a problem on the rare warm days on the West Coast Range in Tasmania, as one pair of cylinders was under the cab, making the cab uncomfortably hot.

The North East Dundas Tramway on which they worked traversed some of the most rugged terrain in the world served by a railway at the time. It featured long stretches of 1-in-25 grades, high trestle bridges and 30-metre-radius reverse curves.

After the line closed in 1929, the boiler of K1 was sold to a sawmill, and in 1947 K1 was sold to its builder Beyer, Peacock & Company, with the boiler and boiler cradle of K2 attached and repatriated back to England. Beyer, Peacock & Company closed in 1966 with K1 sold to the Ffestiniog Railway. However, it was too tall and wide for use within the restricted loading gauge, and after ten years of storage at Porthmadog, it was lent to the National Railway Museum (NRM), York where it was cosmetically restored.

As the Welsh Highland Railway (WHR) rebuilding project reached fruition, K1's potential for the line was recognised and in 1995 it left the NRM. A new boiler was found to be required. Parts were restored at various locations, with K1 reassembled at Boston Lodge. After conversion to oil-firing, it steamed again in 2004 and finally received HM Railway Inspectorate approval in September 2006 to haul trains. A conversion back to coal firing was completed in August 2007 together with some other work which allowed it to appear at the Superpower weekend in early September. It entered regular passenger service in October 2007.

In November 2014, K1's boiler certificate expired and it was withdrawn for overhaul. In 2019 it moved to the Statfold Barn Railway for a period of ten years. A boiler overhaul was started in January 2020. It returned to service in August 2020.
