= Ballyhooley Steam Railway =

Railway line in Australia

Coordinates: 16°29′47.03″S 145°27′25.40″E

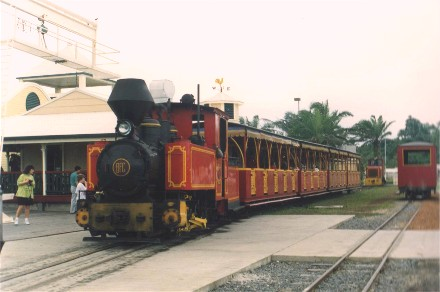
The Bally Hooley Steam Railway

The Bally Hooley Steam Railway was a 2 ft (610 mm) narrow gauge heritage railway that operated in Port Douglas, Queensland, Australia. Its last day of operations was 24 September 2021, with its rolling stock permanently preserved at Crystalbrook Marina.

It operated a 4 km (2.5 mi) line from the Marina Station, located at Crystalbrook Superyacht Marina, to St. Crispins Station and took approximately 1 hour for a return trip.

The service operated on Sundays and days that cruise ships were in town, but was closed on public holidays. One of the steam locomotives was operated on most Sundays. The locomotives were "Speedy", "Bundy" and "Nelson". "Bundy" had a special coal car.
