= Allegiance Mining =

Allegiance Mining NL (ASX:AGM) is an Australian mining company listed on the Australian Securities Exchange on 29 October 1993.

Allegiance operated the Avebury nickel mine project on the west coast of Tasmania, Australia. Allegiance had an ongoing exploration effort targeting nickel sulphide deposits around the Avebury nickel project area and production was scheduled to start in 2008.

Avebury was a significant nickel sulphide discovery located 8 km west of Zeehan. The mineralisation is essentially remobilised nickel sulphide (pentlandite mineral) and is of simple metallurgy, producing some of the world's highest-grade nickel sulphide concentrate.

On February 21, 2023, Allegiance Mining's U.S. division filed for Chapter 11 bankruptcy protection. On February 15, 2024, debtor in possession lenders sued Allegiance Mining, stating the company has over $1.8 million in unpaid fees. In April 2024, the bankruptcy case was voluntarily dismissed.

== Takeover Offer by Zinflex ==
On 17 December 2008, Allegiance received a bid from Ziniflex Australia Limited ("Ziniflex") at $0.90 cents per share (increased to $1.00 per share if the bid was successful). The Board initially rejected this bid, but on 22 February 2008, the Board recommended shareholders accept the increased offer of $1.10 per share, and accepted for all shares owned or controlled by board members.

In March 2008 the board of directors recommended to shareholders the sale of Allegiance Mining to Zinifex Limited for $1.10 per share.

Avebury was then later owned by QCG Resources.
