= Montezuma Falls =

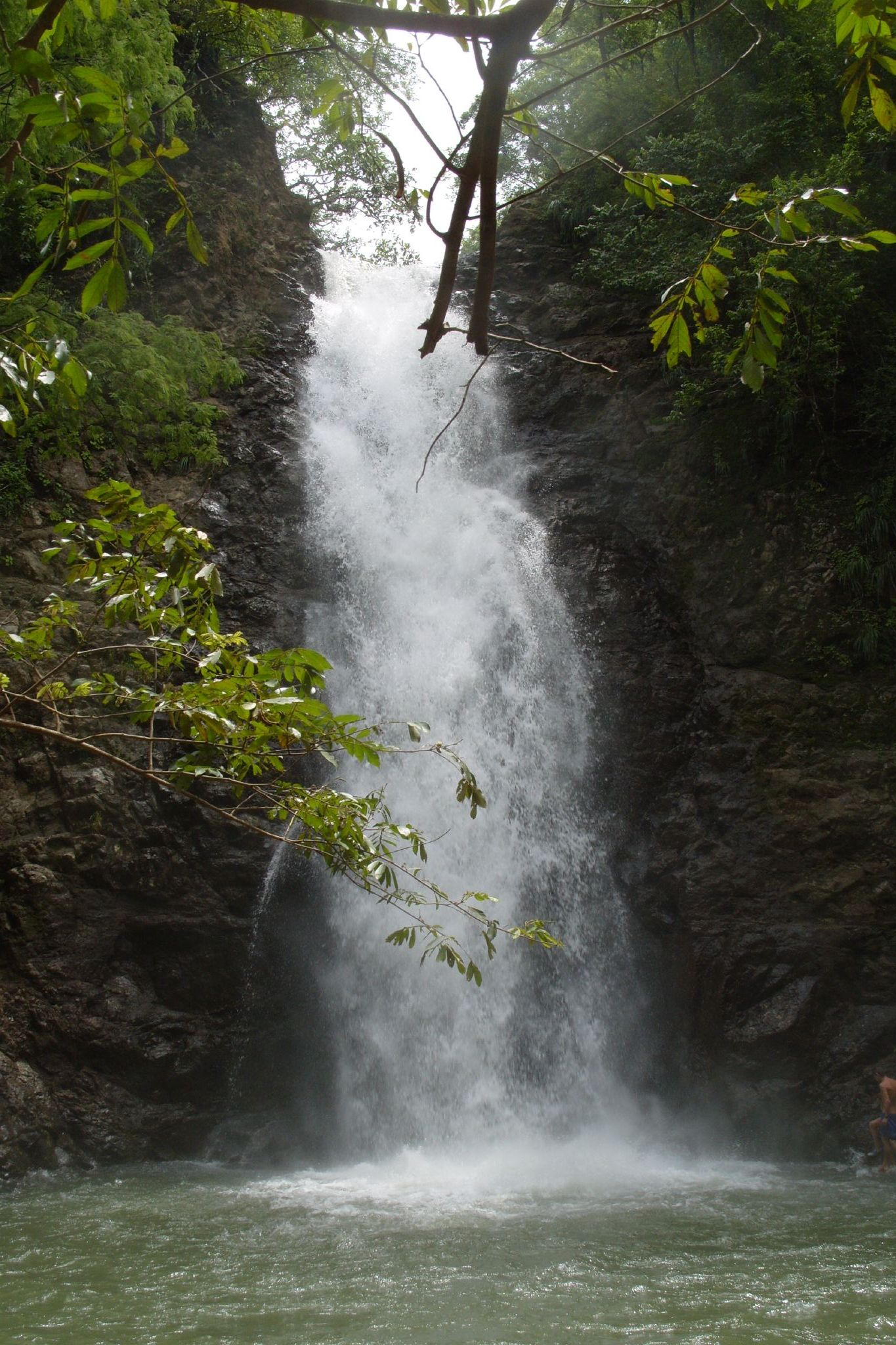
- Montezuma Falls

- Location within Tasmania
- Location: West Coast Range, Tasmania, Australia
- Coordinates: 41°49′48″S 145°28′12″E
- Type: Tiered
- Elevation: 449 metres (1,473 ft) AHD
- Total height: 103–110 m (338–361 ft)
- Number of drops: 2
- Watercourse: A tributary to the Pieman River

The Montezuma Falls (formerly Osbourne Falls), a horsetail waterfall on a minor tributary (Avon Creek) to the Pieman River, is located on the West Coast Range of Tasmania, Australia.

== Naming ==
The falls draws its name from Montezuma (1466–1520), an Aztec emperor of Mexico. A mining company called the Montezuma Silver Mining Company, formed in 1891, held leases in the area surrounding the falls.

== Location and features ==
The Montezuma Falls are situated north-east of Zeehan, near the village of Rosebery, accessible via the Murchison Highway. The falls commence at an elevation of 449 metres (1,473 ft) above sea level and descend in the range of 103–110 metres (338–361 ft), making the falls one of the highest in Tasmania.

The 8-kilometre (5.0 mi) three-hour return walking track from the trackhead at the foot of Mount Read near Williamsford.

== Railway ==
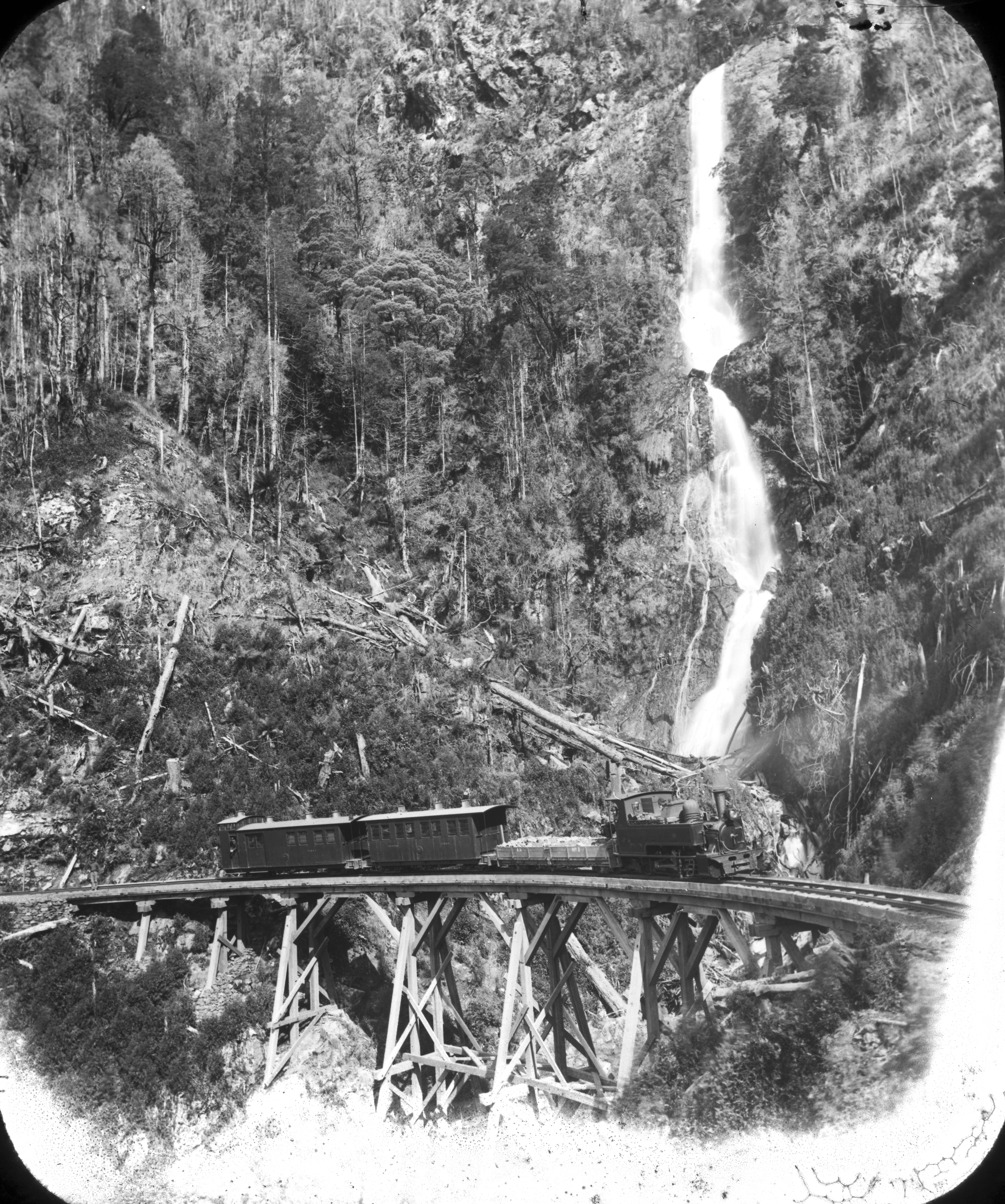
North East Dundas Tramway at Montezuma Falls

The track follows much of the route of the former 2-foot (61 cm) narrow gauge North East Dundas Tramway and earlier views of the falls include the passing railway line.

The falls location was a stopping point on the North East Dundas tram

The proximity of the line to the falls was described in 1926:

This little railway is a "show" line of the highest order, for it dives quickly amongst the mountains, brushing the fringe of immense forests, and at one point giving a near view, of the hand- some Montezuma Falls-so near that the spray actually dashes at times against the carriage win- dows. From Williamsford one can take a motor for the five miles to Rosebery.

The railway alignment, after closing of the operation, was used for trips to view the falls.

== See also ==
- List of waterfalls
- List of waterfalls in Australia
