= Philosophers Ridge =

Ridge in Western Tasmania, Australia

Coordinates: 42°04′S 145°35′E

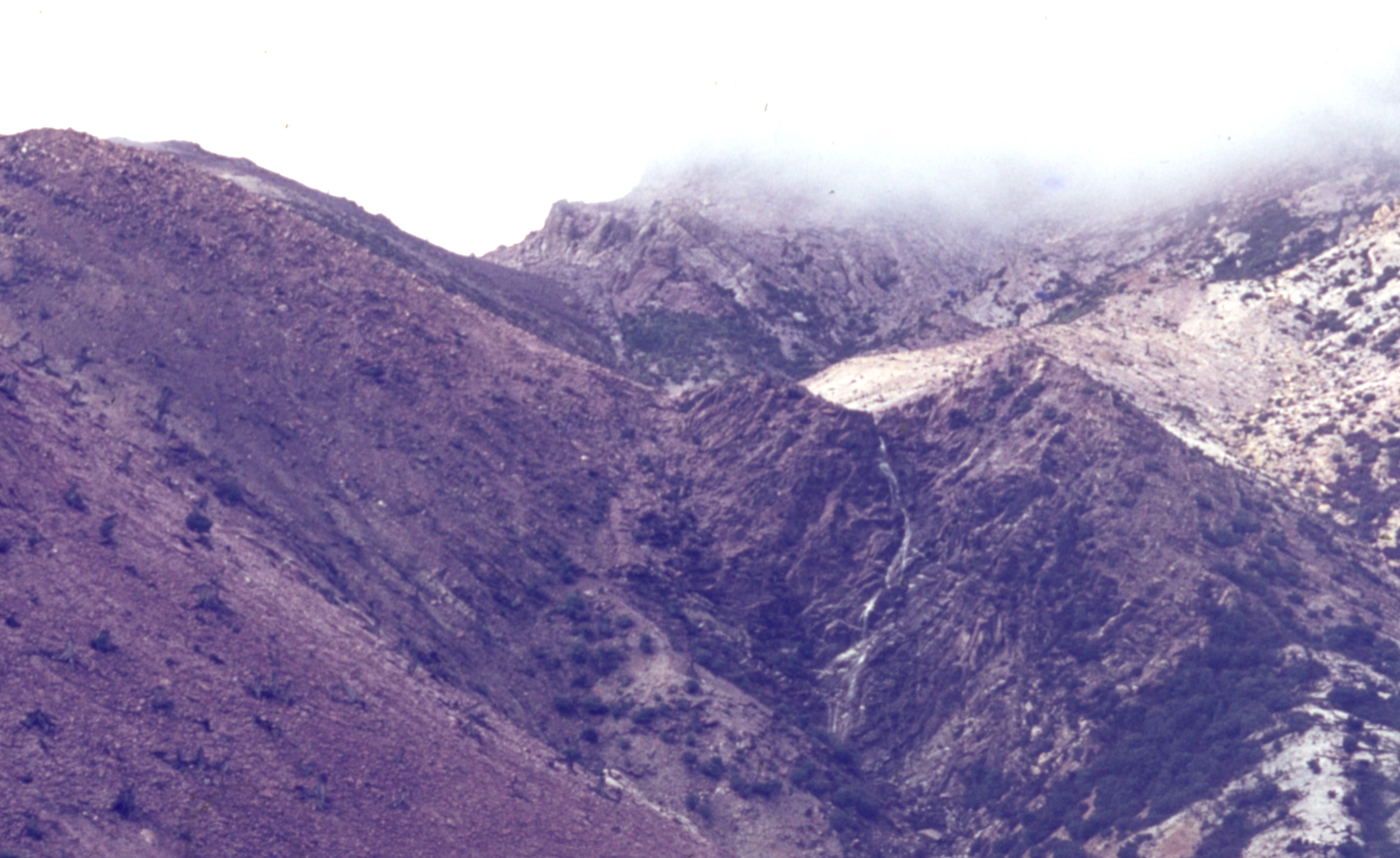
The most southern point of Philosophers Ridge at the top left hand corner of photo, Mount Owen at right

Philosophers Ridge is the long spur that connects Mount Lyell and Mount Owen in the West Coast Range of Western Tasmania.

On it are significant sites of the Mount Lyell copper field.

The original Iron Blow was on its midslopes, discovered on the ridge by Karlson and McDonough.

The North Lyell Mine, scene of the 1912 North Mount Lyell Disaster, was at its northernmost end, on the slopes of Mount Lyell. Very close to the mine was the settlement of the same name; the North Lyell tram traversed the ridge, as did the ill-fated North Lyell aerial tram. These features no longer exist due to the mining of the area, but they all had significant roles to play in the history of the Mount Lyell Mining and Railway Company.

The Gap, the point where the Queenstown to Gormanston road (originally known as the Queenstown to Gormanston Dray Road, now known as the Lyell Highway) passed over the ridge, is the southernmost named feature that remains. Down the western slope of the ridge, the Mount Lyell Haulage and the Mount Lyell aerial tram took ore from the mines that worked on the ridge to the Queenstown smelters.

The eastern slope of the ridge faced into the Linda Valley and the town of Gormanston.
