= 0-4-0+0-4-0 =

Locomotive wheel arrangement

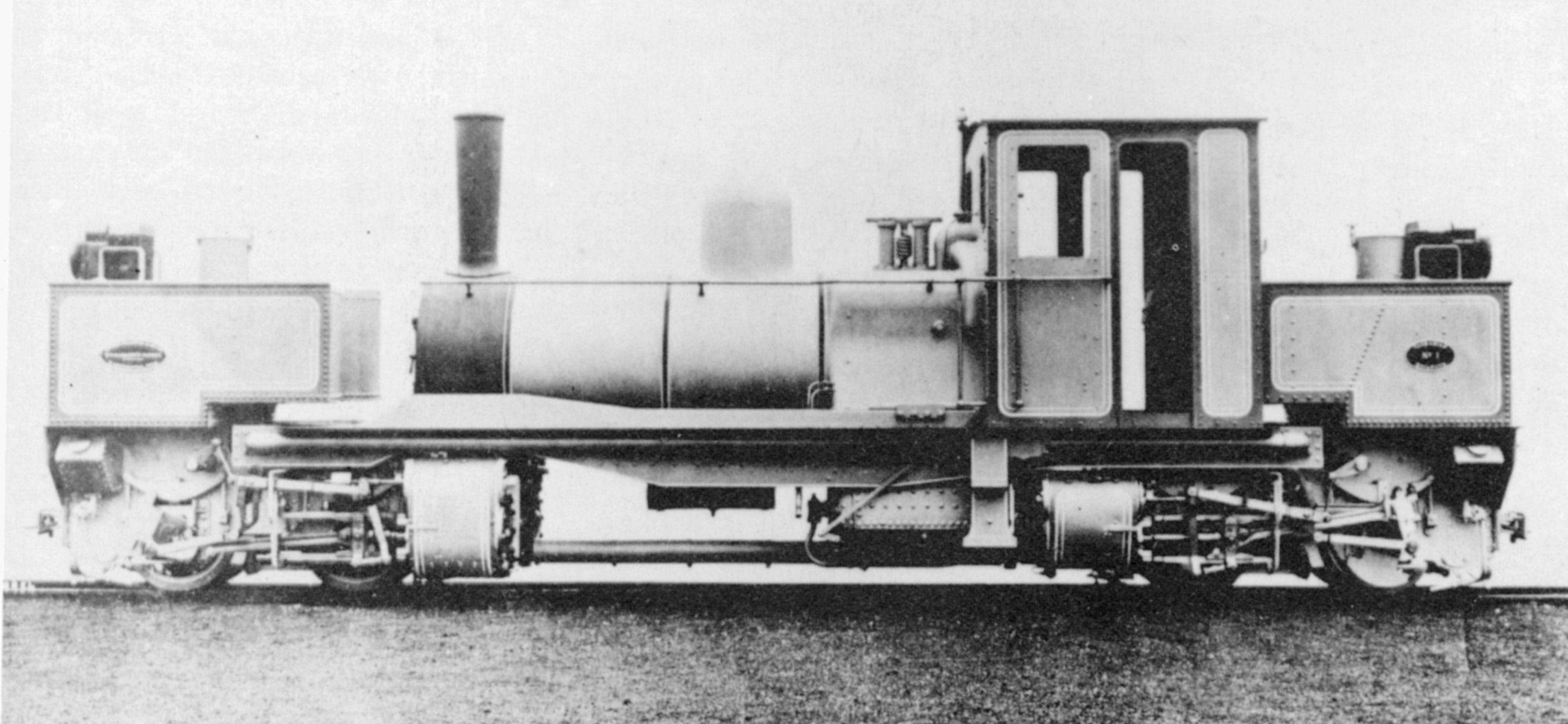
- Tasmanian Government Railways K class works photograph
Equivalent classifications
- UIC class: B+B
- French class: 020+020
- Turkish class: 22+22
- Swiss class: 2/2+2/2, 4/4 from the 1920s
- Russian class: 0-2-0+0-2-0
First known tank engine version
- First use: 1909
- Country: Australia
- Locomotive: TGR K class
- Railway: Tasmanian Government Railways
- Designer: Beyer, Peacock & Company
- Builder: Beyer, Peacock & Company
- Evolved to: 2-4-0+0-4-2
- Benefits: Total engine mass as adhesive weight
- Drawbacks: Instability at speed

Under the Whyte notation for the classification of steam locomotives by wheel arrangement, the 0-4-0+0-4-0 is an articulated locomotive of the Garratt type. The wheel arrangement is effectively two 0-4-0 locomotives operating back-to-back or face-to-face, with the boiler and cab suspended between the two power units. Each power unit has no leading wheels, four powered and coupled driving wheels on two axles and no trailing wheels. A similar arrangement exists for Mallet, Meyer and Fairlie locomotives, but is referred to as 0-4-4-0.

== Overview ==
The first Garratt locomotive, K1, one of two 2 ft (610 mm) gauge Tasmanian Government Railways K class locomotives built in 1909, has this wheel arrangement and has been restored to operating condition at the Welsh Highland Railway. This arrangement proved one of the less popular Garratt types, since most Garratt locomotives were larger and more powerful, requiring more pairs of driving wheels to operate within the normal axle load limits, and because leading wheels gave more stability and better tracking to allow higher speeds.

In total, 34 Garratts of this type were constructed, seven by Garratt patent holder Beyer, Peacock & Company, mostly for industrial use, and 27 by other builders. The largest user of the type was the C.F. Vicinaux du Mayumbe in the Belgian Congo, with twenty locomotives built to a 600 mm (1 ft 11 5/8 in) gauge by St Leonard in Belgium.

0-4-0+0-4-0 Garratt production list – All manufacturers
Gauge	Railway	Class	Works no.	Units	Year	Builder
500 mm	Southern Fuegian Railway, Argentina	"Engineer Porta"		1	1994	Argentina
500 mm	Southern Fuegian Railway, Argentina	"Engineer Zubieta"		1	2006	Girdlestone Rail, South Africa
600 mm	C.F.Vicinaux du Mayumbe, Zaïre	E	2096	1	1927	St Leonard, Belgium
600 mm	C.F.Vicinaux du Mayumbe, Zaïre	A	1708-1709	2	1911	St Leonard, Belgium
600 mm	C.F.Vicinaux du Mayumbe, Zaïre	A	1715-1716	2	1911	St Leonard, Belgium
600 mm	C.F.Vicinaux du Mayumbe, Zaïre	B	1899-1900	2	1919	St Leonard, Belgium
600 mm	C.F.Vicinaux du Mayumbe, Zaïre	B	1953-1956	4	1921	St Leonard, Belgium
600 mm	C.F.Vicinaux du Mayumbe, Zaïre		2021-2025	5	1924	St Leonard, Belgium
600 mm	C.F.Vicinaux du Mayumbe, Zaïre	C	2056-2059	4	1926	St Leonard, Belgium
2 ft	Darjeeling Himalayan, India	D	5407	1	1910	Beyer, Peacock
2 ft	Tasmanian Government Railways	K	5292-5293	2	1909	Beyer, Peacock & Company
750 mm	Mines du Zaccar, Algeria		1752	1	1936	Du Haine Saint-Pierre
750 mm	Mines du Zaccar, Algeria		1783	1	1937	Du Haine Saint-Pierre
750 mm	Mines du Zaccar, Algeria		1781	1	1912	St. Leonard, Belgium
1,000 mm	Porto Feliz Sugar Co, Brazil		2091	1	1927	St Leonard, Belgium
1,000 mm	Piracicaba Sugar Co, Brazil		2108	1	1927	St Leonard, Belgium
4 ft 8 1/2 in	Vivian & Sons		6172	1	1924	Beyer, Peacock & Company
4 ft 8 1/2 in	Sneyd Colliery, Burslem		6729	1	1931	Beyer, Peacock
4 ft 8 1/2 in	Guest, Keen & Baldwins		6779	1	1934	Beyer, Peacock & Company
4 ft 8 1/2 in	Baddesley Colliery, Atherstone		6841	1	1937	Beyer, Peacock & Company

== Use ==
=== Argentina ===
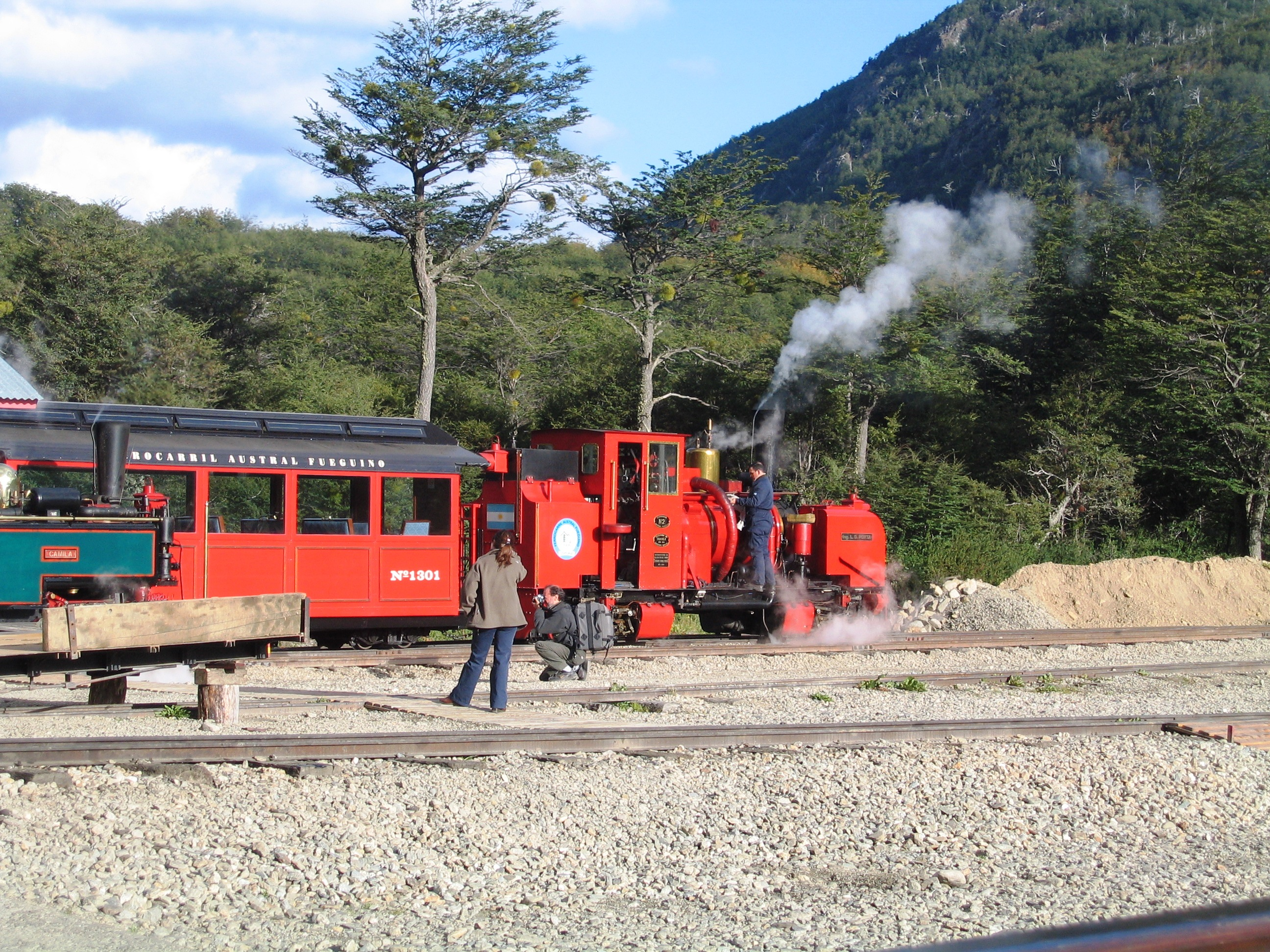
The Engineer Porta of the FCAF

The 500 mm (19 3/4 in) gauge Southern Fuegian Railway (F.C.A.F.) in Argentina procured a new 0-4-0+0-4-0 Garratt in 1994. Based on Livio Dante Porta's work, it included larger cross section tubing, insulation of the boiler and an improved front end. This vastly improved the economy of this modern steam engine and more than doubled train length.

Accordingly, a second Garratt for this railway was built to similar specifications, but with superheating added, in the workshops of Girdlestone Rail in Port Shepstone, South Africa. It was shipped to Argentina in 2006 and entered service in October of that year. These locomotives had their engine units arranged face-to-face.

=== Australia ===
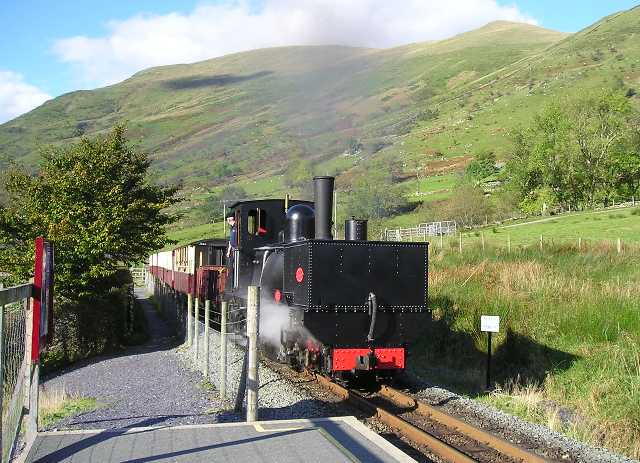
Tasmanian Government Railways Garratt K1 on the Welsh Highland Railway

The Tasmanian Government Railways K class was the first class of Garratt locomotive ever produced. They differed from most later Garratts in two respects.

- They were compound locomotives, with two high-pressure cylinders on the rear engine unit and two larger low-pressure cylinders on the front engine unit.
- Their engine units were arranged with their cylinders facing each other, rather than back-to-back as on most other Garratts.

=== United Kingdom ===
In addition to K1 at the Welsh Highland Railway, the standard gauge industrial Beyer-Garratt William Francis, built in 1937, is preserved at the Bressingham Steam Museum. This locomotive had its engine units arranged back-to-back in the usual Garratt fashion.
