= Zeehan railway station =

Railway station in Western Tasmania, Australia

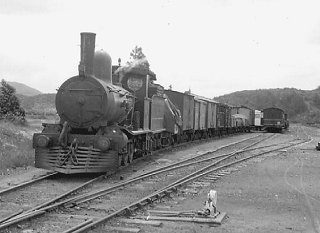
C11 steam locomotive with goods train in Zeehan, 1949

Zeehan railway station in Tasmania, was a major junction and railway yard for numerous different railway and tramway systems in western Tasmania in the town of Zeehan.

Its peak of operations was between the 1890s and the late 1920s – reflecting the general fate of the town and the industries that were located in the Zeehan and surrounding districts. A good example of the peak era, is in 1905 with 34 trains in one day at the station.

== Terminus ==
It was the terminus of the Strahan–Zeehan Railway from the south, the Emu Bay Railway from the north and a number of narrow gauge tram systems that utilised the railway yard and radiated out in all directions from the station.

The narrow gauge North East Dundas Tramway line proceeded separately out of the station and yard following the Emu Bay railway alignment, before it turned toward its easterly route.

== Yard ==
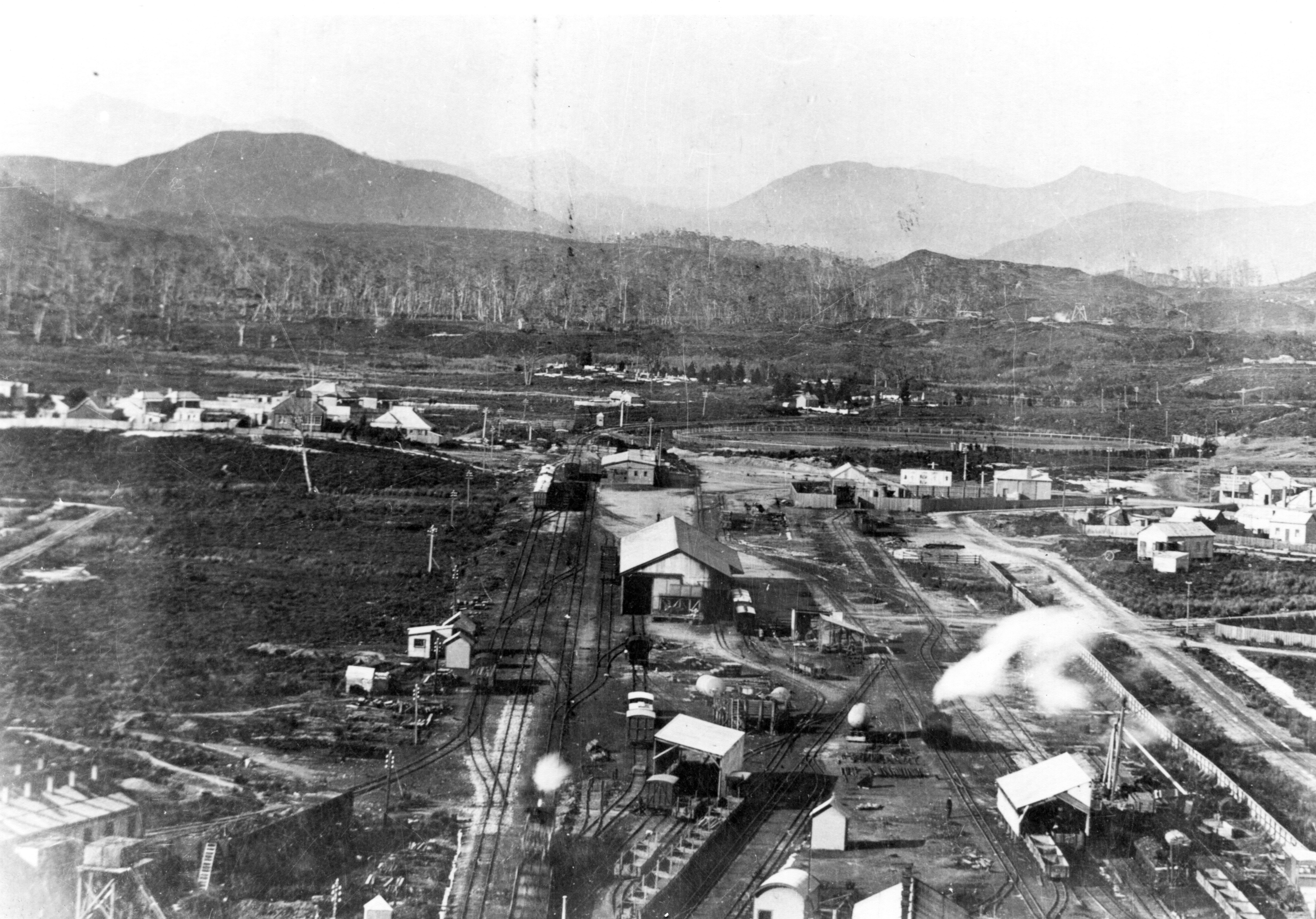
Zeehan railway station yard from the north - with West Coast Range at the rear. Photo description: An early aerial view of Zeehan station looking south showing the 3ft 6in Government and Emu Bay lines in the centre with an EBR train arriving and the 2ft gauge North East Dundas yards to the right

The government railway that linked the Mount Lyell railway to the Emu Bay railway, and then to Burnie was an important part of the government railway system. The government looked to improve the facilities over time while the railways were carrying optimum freight loads.

In 1913 the railway workshops were moved from West Strahan to Zeehan and the yard, over half a mile long, with two gauges and many sidings, was one of the biggest in the state

The Zeehan railway station yard was extensive with numerable small tram lines connecting with the yard in the peak of the activity at the station from before the First World War until the beginning of the depression – when most smaller tramways and mines and smelter operations had ceased to operate.

A map by C.C. Singleton of the Australian Railway Historical Society in Bulletin 289 November 1961, and in Bulletin 312, October 1963 offer an understanding of the yard layout:

=== Operators ===
- Zeehan Tramway Company
- N.E.Dundas Tramway
- Government railway to Strahan
- Emu Bay Railway Company

=== Facilities ===
- Passenger station
- Goods shed
- Emu Bay Railway engine shed
- Workshops shed
- Carriage shed
- Engine shed
- Zeehan Tramway sheds

== Tramways ==
Tramways mentioned here specifically utilised the Zeehan railway station as their terminus.

- Comstock Tram
- Dunkleys Tram
- Federation Tram
- Florence Tram
- Grubb's Tramway
- Howards Tram
- New Dundas Tramway commenced in 1891, absorbed into the Mariposa Tramway, and later again into Howard's tramway system
- Mariposa Tramway
- North East Dundas Tramway was a 2' line leaving Zeehan to the Mount Read area.
- Oonah Tram
- Zeehan Tramway Company - constructed in the 1890s, taken over by the Dunkley Brothers in 1918.

== Accidents ==
A spectacular boiler explosion occurred at 7.15 am on 17 May 1899 in the Zeehan railway station yard. The North-East Dundas tram approached the Wilson Street waiting room at the end of the station yard, the engine exploded. The fireman Thomas Marra was killed instantly and the driver David Biddulph died soon after.

== Decline ==
- In 1905, Zeehan Tramway Company ceased daily passenger service
- In 1926, Dundas line regular services traffic ceased and line pulled up in 1940.
- In 1929, NE Dundas and Comstock lines traffic ceased and all line up by 1943.
- In 1948, the last year of heavy traffic between Rosebery and Zeehan
- In 1950, the passenger service was conducted by rail motor.
- In 1960, the Emu Bay Railway passenger service ceased in February
- In 1960, the Strahan-Zeehan Railway line closed in June.
- On 14 August 1965, the Emu Bay Railway goods services ceased.

== Post closure status ==
In 1971, Frank Stamford of The Light Railway Research Society of Australia wrote in Light Railways:

A visit on 12th April 1971 showed that the station building has gone, and most of the track has been rather half-heartedly removed. A length of 2 ft gauge track can still be found near where the station building used to be. The various engine sheds and carriage sheds remain, and are still being used by local timber millers, transport contractors, etc.

== See also ==
- Railways on the West Coast of Tasmania
