= Williamsford, Tasmania =

Ghost town in Tasmania, Australia

Coordinates: 41°50′S 145°39′E

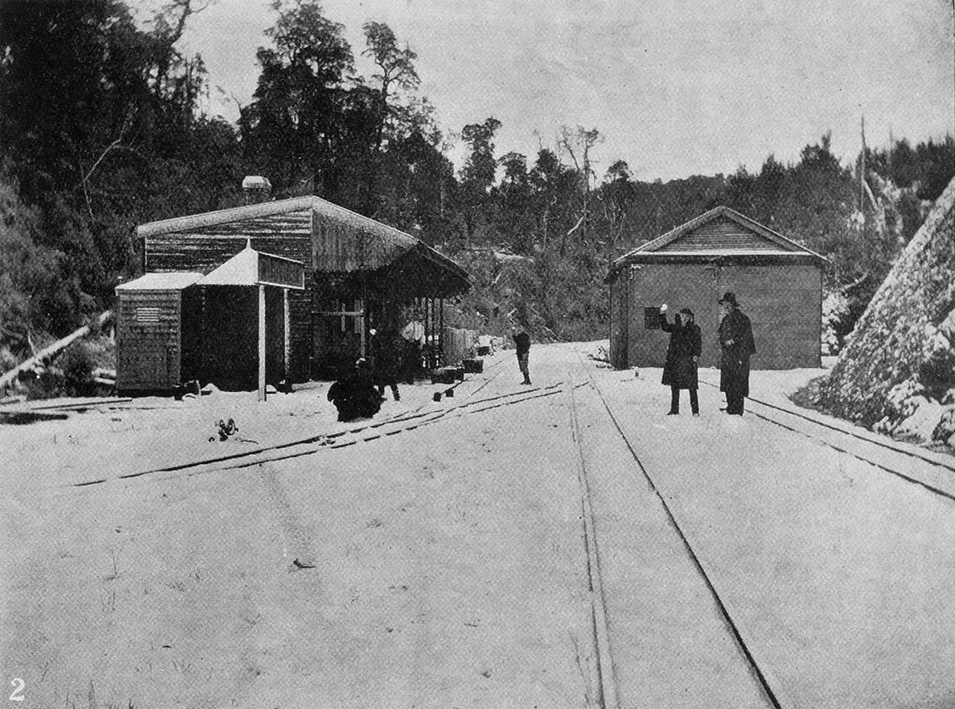
Williamsford railway station in snow in 1909

Williamsford, Tasmania is the location of a former mining community, south of Rosebery, Tasmania and on the western lower reaches of Mount Read.

It was formerly reached by the North East Dundas Tramway a line which operated between 1896 and 1929.

It was also the location of the Hercules Haulage - a 2-foot gauge haulage line on the western slope of Mount Read, and the later Rosebery - Williamsford Aerial Ropeway.

The town had an Australian rules team in the Rosebery Football Association until the competition disbanded in 1963.

In 1924, Charles Whitham wrote:-

Williamsford is the township attached to Mount Read, and is right at the foot of the steepest and longest haulage line we have... 5 miles from Rosbery by road, and 18 miles from Zeehan by tramway, and if you like rugged and wild scenery you will find it a charming place

By the late twentieth century there were no longer inhabitants of this community.

The townsite is to become the new site of a collection of conifers. These conifers have been collected over the last 15 years from a number of Southern Hemisphere countries where they are approaching extinction. The collected species of trees are considered extremely rare living examples of prehistoric conifers and to be "the best collection in the world".

== See also ==
- Montezuma Falls
