= Hercules Haulage =

Self acting tramway in Tasmania, Australia

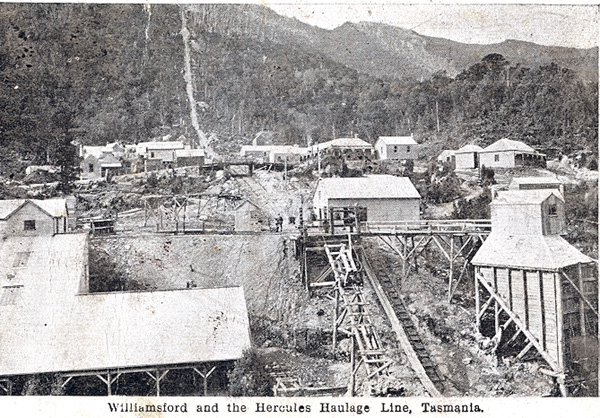
The Hercules Haulage Line connected the Williamsford township to the Hercules Mine above

The Hercules Haulage, also known as the Mount Read Haulage, the Hercules Tram and the Williamsford Haulage Line, was a self-acting 2 ft (610 mm) narrow gauge tramway on the side of Mount Read in Western Tasmania, that connected the Hercules Mine with Williamsford and then to the North East Dundas Tramway.

== The Mine ==
The Haulage was created to move ores from the Hercules Mine on Mount Read. The mine was operational between the 1890s and the 1980s, and closed in 2000; rehabilitation works commenced in 2005.

== The Haulage ==
The haulage was "self acting", one mile (1.6 km) long and 1,642 feet (550m) high with a maximum gradient of 1 in 5. It was claimed to be the largest and steepest self-acting tramway of its kind.

== Later haulage ==
On the closure of the NE Dundas Tramway, the Aerial Ropeway from Hercules was built which took ore in a northerly direction to Rosebery, some literature confuses the two separate systems.
