= Cape Sorell Lighthouse =

Lighthouse in Tasmania, Australia

- Location: Tasmania; Australia
- Coordinates: 42°11′52.4″S 145°10′09.0″E

Tower
- Constructed: 1899
- Construction: brick tower
- Automated: 1971
- Height: 40 metres (130 ft)
- Shape: conical tower with balcony and lantern
- Markings: white tower and lantern dome, grey lantern
- Power source: solar power
- Heritage: Australian Heritage Register

Light
- Focal height: 51 metres (167 ft) AHD
- Intensity: white: 208,000 cp, red: 83,000 cp
- Range: white: 32 kilometres (20 mi), red: 19 kilometres (12 mi)
- Characteristic: Fl (2) 15s.

The Cape Sorell Lighthouse is a heritage-listed lighthouse that is located on Cape Sorell in the West Coast region of Tasmania, Australia. The lighthouse is situated approximately 12 kilometres (7.5 mi) southwest of Strahan.

Constructed and first lit in 1899, the 40-metre-high (130 ft) lighthouse is the only structure remaining from a brick complex of tower, three houses and engine room, except for the foundation remnants of the three keepers' residences.

The light characteristic is a group of two flashes that occurs every fifteen seconds, its focal plane is at 51 metres (167 ft) above sea level with a white light intensity of 208,000 candlepower, visible for 32 kilometres (20 mi) and the red, of 83,000 candlepower, visible for 19 kilometres (12 mi).

Initially fed by vapourised kerosene, the station was automated in 1971 and in 1998, the light was converted to solar power.

Further automation occurred in 2012.

== See also ==
- History of Tasmania
- List of lighthouses in Tasmania
