= North East Dundas Tramway =

Former railway near Zeehan, Tasmania

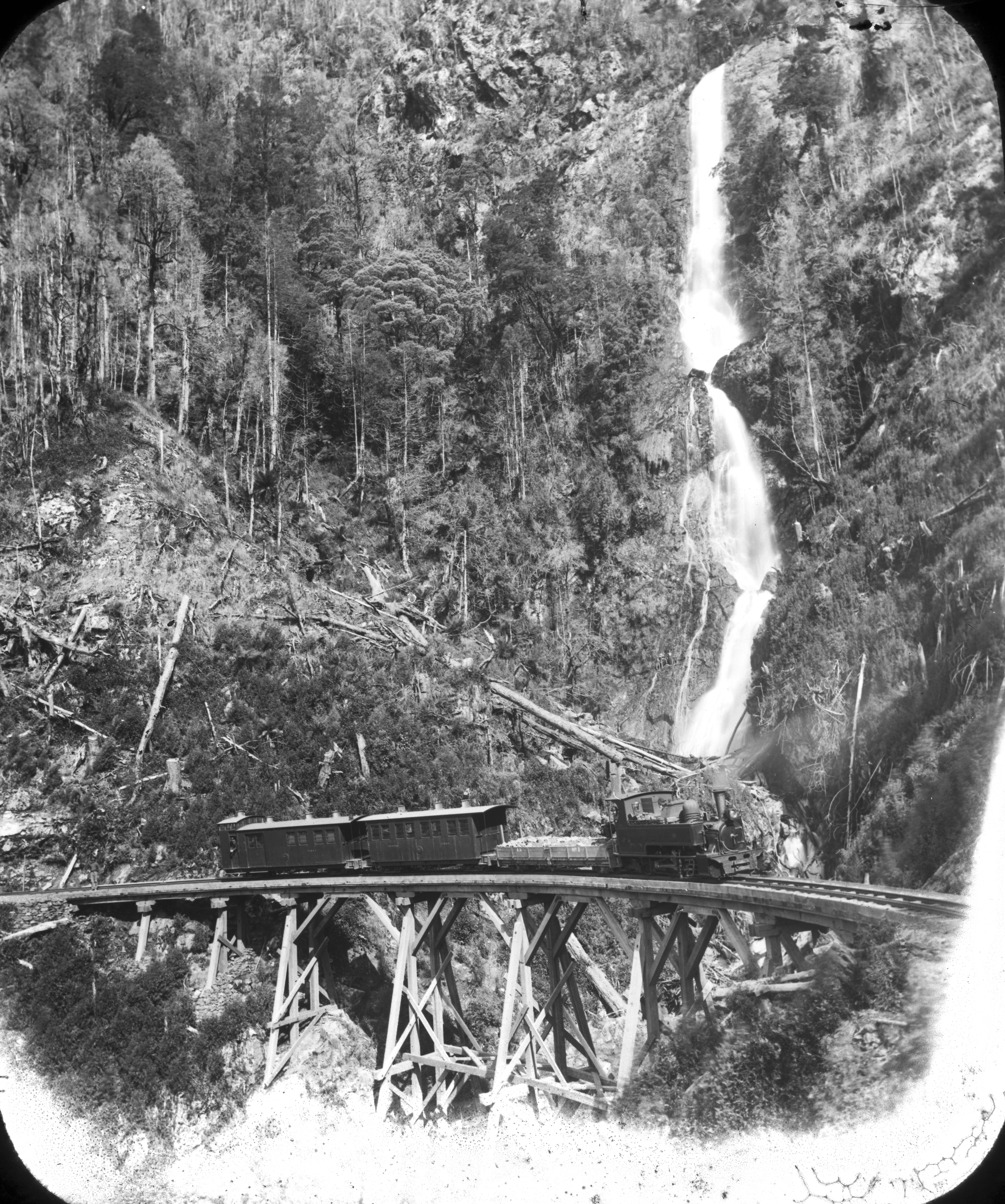
Tasmanian Government Railways G class locomotive crosses the Montezuma Bridge on the North East Dundas Tramway with a mixed train to Zeehan around 1899

The North East Dundas Tramway was a 2 ft (610 mm) narrow gauge tramway, that ran between Zeehan and Deep Lead (now Williamsford) on the West Coast of Tasmania. Opening in 1896 and closing in 1932, it was part of the Tasmanian Government Railways network. The world's first Garratt locomotives, the K class, were used on the line.

== History ==
Construction of the line to carry ore from the Williamsford mines to Zeehan, where it was loaded onto another train for shipment to Burnie commenced in January 1896, with the first section opened in December 1896. It opened in full on 18 June 1898.

The narrow-gauge (2 ft) was chosen because of the extremely difficult terrain that the railway crossed, requiring several big trestle bridges, including one at the foot of Montezuma Falls. After some rain the engine and carriages would get soaked by spray from the falls. A detailed description of conditions along the line is included in a report of a journey undertaken in 1900 by the Fitzroy Australian rules football team. During their journey down the mountain to Zeehan, one of the carriages left the rails on a tight bend and the players lifted it back on the rails. There was a break-of-gauge with the mainline 3 ft 6 in (1,067 mm) system at Zeehan. The tramway was closed on 5 July 1932, although regular services had ceased three years earlier.

After closure some of the assets were sold; for instance a point lever was sighted on a private siding connecting to the Walhalla railway line at Erica railway station, Victoria in 1954.

== Locomotives ==
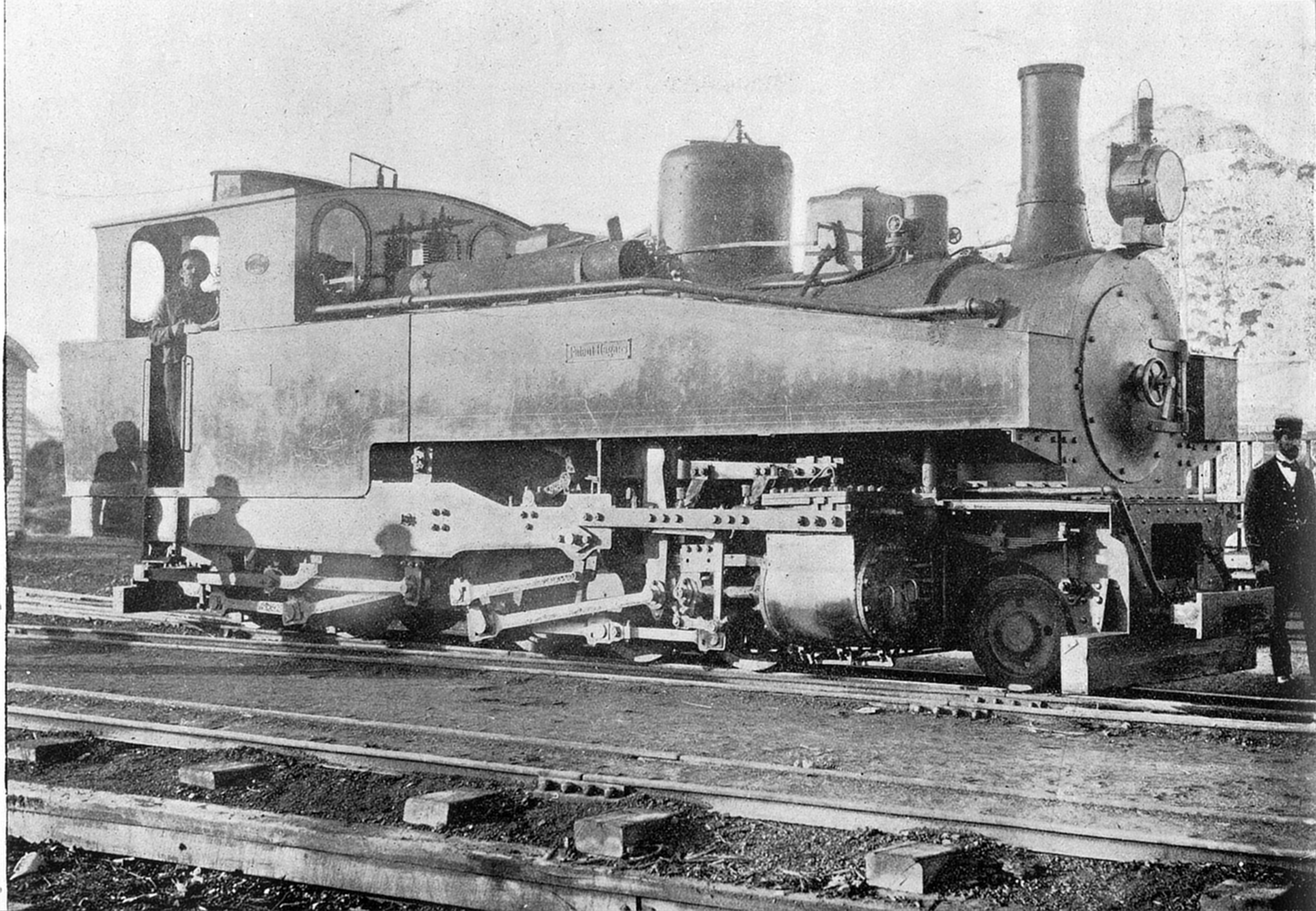
J class 2-6-4-0T

Several tight-radius curves required careful consideration of the locomotives that were suitable to run on them. Operations commenced with two G class 0-4-2T locomotives. Shortly after entering service, G1 was destroyed in May 1899 after the boiler exploded. The crew were killed and the boiler flung 30 metres into the air landing 230 metres away. A replacement arrived in 1900, assuming G1's identity. After the tramway closed, both were sold to the Isis Sugar Mill in Cordalba, Queensland and converted to tender locomotives.

In 1901, a J class 2-6-4-0T was delivered. It was the first articulated locomotive to run on the line and was, at the time, the heaviest 2 ft (610 mm) narrow gauge locomotive in the southern hemisphere, weighing 42 tonnes. It was more powerful than its 3 ft 6 in (1,067 mm) gauge counterparts. Its weight played havoc with the light rails it ran over and in 1910 it was replaced by the K class 0-4-0+0-4-0 Garratt locomotives. The J class languished in the Zeehan locomotive shed until 1949, when it was scrapped.

K1 was presented back to its manufacturer, Beyer, Peacock & Company of Manchester and repatriated to England in 1947. After the closure of Beyer, Peacock & Company, K1 was sold in 1966 to the Ffestiniog Railway. Since 2020, it has been based at the Statfold Barn Railway.

== Stopping places ==
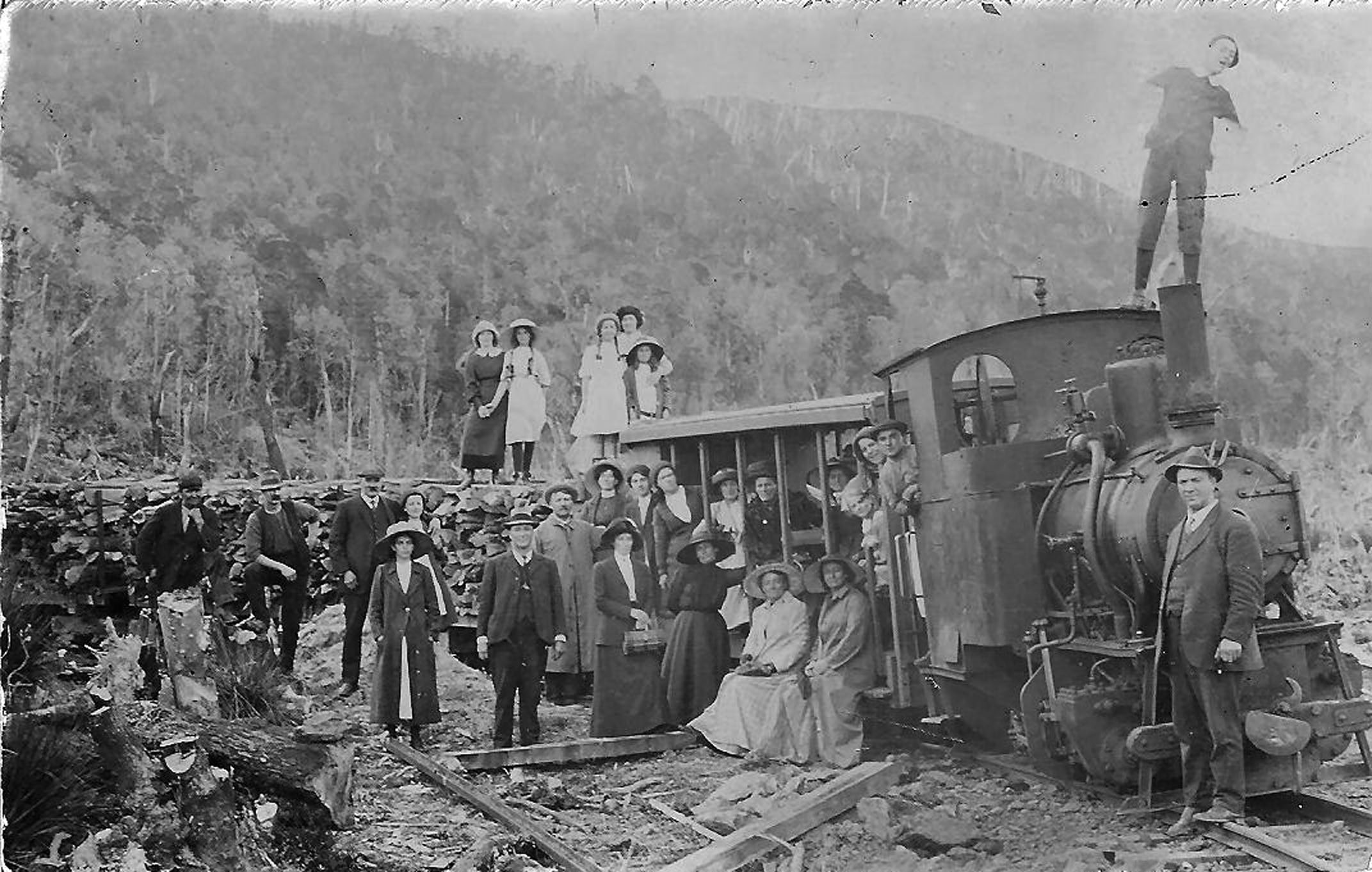
Picnic with Dunkley Brothers Orenstein & Koppel (BN 2748) at Kapia

(distances from Walch's Tasmanian Almanac 1915 p. 237)

- Zeehan
- Wilson Street
- Zeehan Racecourse
- King's
- Hastings
- Nickel Junction – also known as Nickel Show (4.5 miles)
- North Dundas Road
- Melba Flats
- Commonwealth
- Japi
- Confidence Saddle
- Good Intent
- Great Northern
- Fraser's—also known as Fraser's Mine
- Montezuma (14.5 miles)
- Fahl Ore
- Conliffe
- Williamsford—opened as Deep Lead—renamed by 1898 (18 miles)
- Connected to Hercules Mine on Mount Read by a 2 ft (610 mm) narrow gauge Hercules Haulage incline

== Accidents ==
In May 1899, a locomotive boiler exploded in the Zeehan yard, killing the driver and fireman. The G class locomotive was destroyed.

== Further literature ==
- William Prior Hales: The North East Dundas Tramway, Tasmania. The Institution of Civil Engineers-Minutes of Proceedings, Volume 140, 1899-1900 Session. In: Greg Stephenson: The North East Dundas Tram - An Engineering Account. 1 February 1997. Retrieved on 13 June 2018.
- North East Dundas Tramway, Tasmania. Light Railways No. 91, January 1986. Retrieved on 13 June 2018.
