= Ferd Kayser =

Australian mine manager

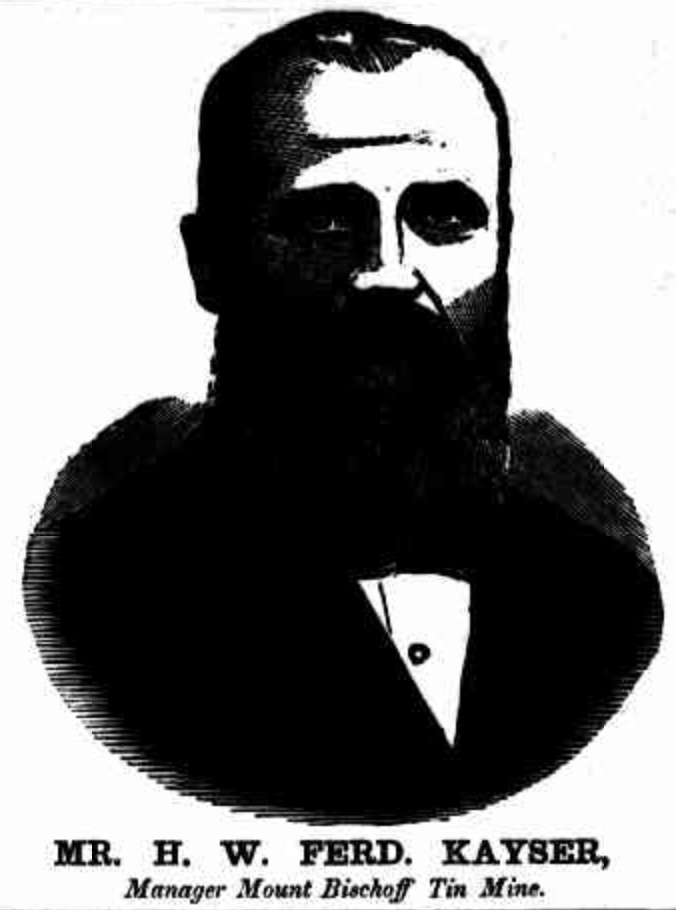
Portrait of Ferd Kayser, published in the Launceston newspaper The Colonist in April 1888

Heinrich Wilhelm Ferdinand "Ferd" Kayser, FRGS (1833 – 12 October 1919) was the mine manager of Mount Bischoff Tin Mining Company for thirty years.

== Biography ==
Kayser was born in Clausthal, Germany, the third son of mining engineer Georg or George Andreas Kayser. At age 19 Kayser emigrated to Australia aboard Steinwärder (Steinwaerder), arriving in South Australia in September 1853. In the following year, Kayser joined the gold rush in Victoria. In 1863, he became manager of a gold mine in Sandhurst, now Bendigo, where in 1861 he had been naturalised as a British subject.

The Mount Bischoff tin deposit was discovered in 1873 by James "Philosopher" Smith, who formed a company two years later to extract the ore. Professor G. H. F. Ulrich was brought in to assess the find, which was positive, and William M. Crosby was appointed mine manager, but was soon forced to resign on grounds of ill-health. At the insistence of Professor Ulrich (also from Clausthal) and Professor J. Cosmo Newbery, yet in the face of considerable opposition, Kayser was hired as mine manager. Confounding the doubters, Kayser built the township of Waratah and a railway to the coast, allowing the mine to prosper, making around £1,250,000 for its investors.

Kayser was made Justice of the Peace in 1877, which meant he was frequently called on to adjudicate as a magistrate in less serious breaches of the law. In 1885 he brought a case of criminal libel against Henry Horatio Gill, whose newspaper, The Tasmanian News, carried an article Sketches of a mining township, Justices, Police and Law by Perleeseman X clearly about him, which imputed that he had failed, as a magistrate, to apply the law impartially. The judge did not find Gill guilty of an offence, and suggested Kayser sue Gill in the civil court if he wanted to take the matter further.

Kayser was also consulting engineer to the Briseis mine near Derby, Tasmania, and was frequently consulted by other companies. Around 1900 he relinquished his Briseis responsibilities, but retained his position as supervising engineer of the Mount Bischoff Co., at £4800 per annum.

Kayser and Ulrich remained friends until the latter's accidental death in 1900, but an enmity arose between him and "Philosopher" Smith which was never resolved. In 1908 he and his wife returned to Victoria and had a home "Willesden" in East St Kilda, where he died in 1919.

== Other interests ==
Kayser was a longtime member of the Australasian Institute of Mining Engineers; vice-president in 1894, and president 1898 and 1899.

In February 1882 he lodged a patent application for improved machinery for classifying, dressing, and concentrating ores. Machines for dressing tin ore were manufactured to his design in Launceston.

== Family ==
Kayser married Elizabeth Mary Druce on 4 March 1876. Their family included:

- Agnes Elizabeth Kayser (23 December 1876 – ?) married George Crosby Gilmore MP on 26 April 1898
- Bertha Kayser (7 August 1879 – 24 September 1907) married Thomas Gibbons, lived in Epsom, England
- daughter (26 April 1881 – ?)
- daughter (24 November 1882 – ?)
- daughter (2 May 1885 – ?)
- daughter (25 November 1887 – ?)
- daughter (28 June 1889 – ?)
- son (15 December 1890 – ?)
