= Geology of Tasmania =

Geology of state of Australia

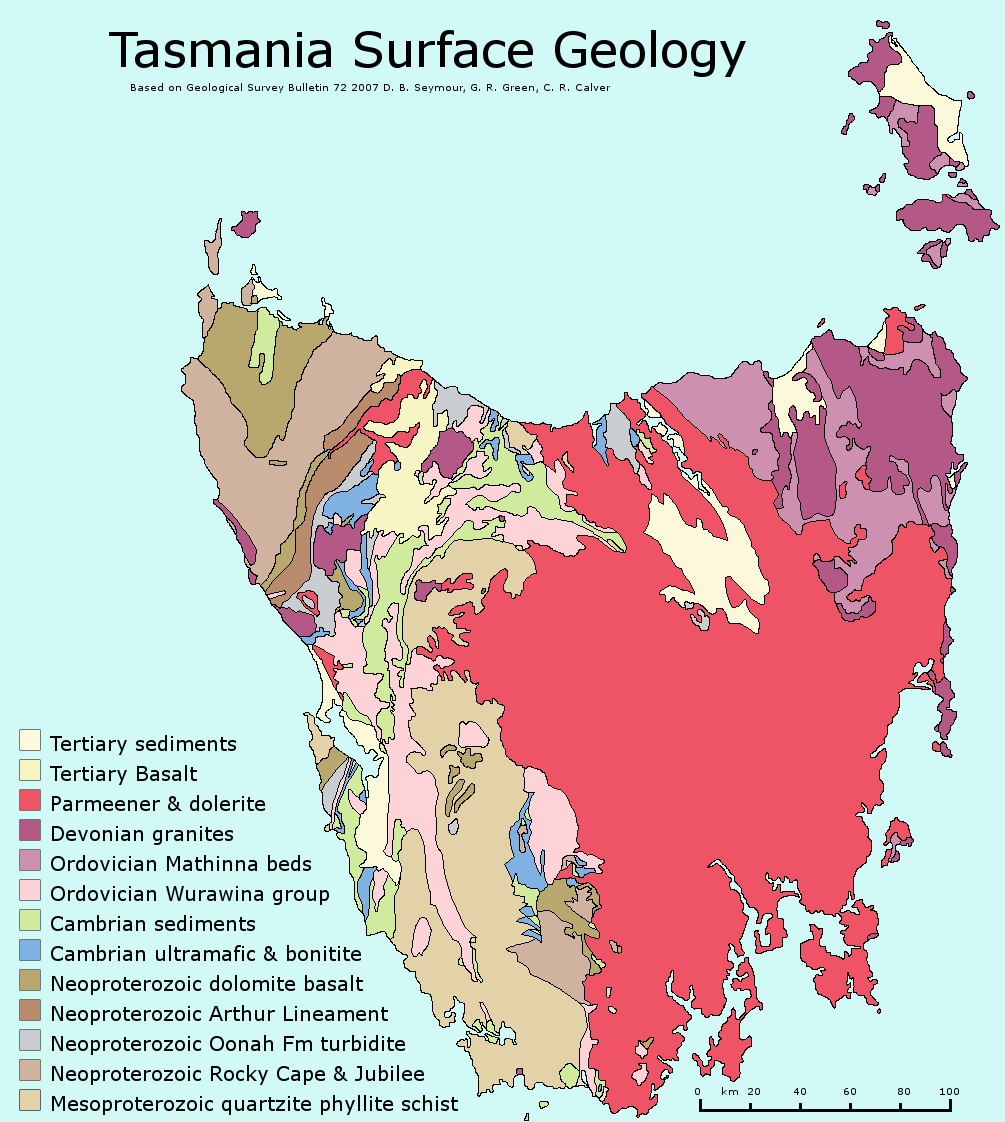
Surface geology of Tasmania

The geology of Tasmania is complex, with the world's biggest exposure of dolerite (diabase in North American English). The rock record contains representatives of each period of the Neoproterozoic, Paleozoic, Mesozoic and Cenozoic eras. It is one of the few southern hemisphere areas that were glaciated during the Pleistocene with glacial landforms in the higher parts. The west coast region hosts significant mineralisation and numerous active and historic mines.

== Geological history ==
Tasmanian Geological Timeline
← / Separation from Antarctica; ← / Glaciation ends; ← / Tyennan Orogeny; ← / Granite in west; ← / Granite in east; ← / Oldest Tasmanian rock on King Island; ← / Strathgordon phyllite; ← / Lyell Highway metamorphosed siltstone; ← / arc–continent collision; ← / Orogeny; ← / Massive dolerite intrusion; ← / Permian glaciation; ← / Marinoan Glaciation; ← / Sturtian glaciation
An approximate time-scale of events in the Geological history of Tasmania. Axis scale is in millions of years ago.

The earliest geological history is recorded in rocks from over 1,270 million years ago. Older rocks from western Tasmania and King Island were strongly folded and metamorphosed into rocks such as quartzite. After this there are many signs of glaciation from the Cryogenian, as well as the global warming that occurred at the start of the Ediacaran period. An orogeny folded the older Precambrian rocks. In the Cambrian time the Tyennan block forming the south west and central Tasmania, was pushed up and slightly over the land of north west Tasmania, the Tyennan Orogeny. Then there were volcanic action and sediments from the Cambrian and Ordovician. The large ore deposits were formed on the West Coast. The north east of Tasmania began to form as part of the Lachlan Orogen with turbidity flows of mud and sand on to the ocean floor. In the Devonian the Tabberabberan Orogeny caused more folding, and intrusion of granite on the west and east coasts, and probably joined the east of Tasmania to the west.

In the Permian period, conditions were again glacial and the Tasmania basin formed, with low sea levels in the Triassic. A giant intrusion of magma happened in the Jurassic forming dolerite which gives many of the Tasmanian mountains their characteristic appearance. The continental breakup happened in the Cretaceous and Cenozoic Periods, splitting off undersea plateaus, forming Bass Strait and ultimately breaking Tasmania away from Antarctica. In the Cenozoic, a couple of basins extended inland from Macquarie Harbour and the northern Midlands. The higher mountains were glaciated during the Pleistocene.

=== Precambrian ===
The oldest rocks in Tasmania from the Precambrian form several blocks. The blocks are King Island; Rocky Cape in the North West, Dundas Element in the mid west; Sheffield Element in the central north; Tyennan Element in the west central and south west; and the Adamsfield-Jubilee Element in the south central to south coast.

The island's oldest rocks seem to have originated when that part of the island was attached to western North America. Analysis of monazite and zircon in rocks of the ancient Rocky Cape Group in north-west Tasmania found that they are between 1.45 billion and 1.33 billion years old. These minerals, strongly resemble those found in Montana, Idaho and southern British Columbia. Fossils called Horodyskia have also been found in both sites. Importantly, at more than 1 billion years old, the fossils are some of the oldest visible to the naked eye. Previous theories had suggested that Tasmania emerged from central Australia as the supercontinents broke apart, but the recent spectroscopic and radioactive dating evidence contradicts this.

Tasmania's geographic location during the Precambrian is still unclear, but it is clear that some of it was linked to an area of ancient North America. The rocks of Tasmania are much older than those of the east coast of Australia indicating a different geologic history. Alternative ideas for the location are presented below.

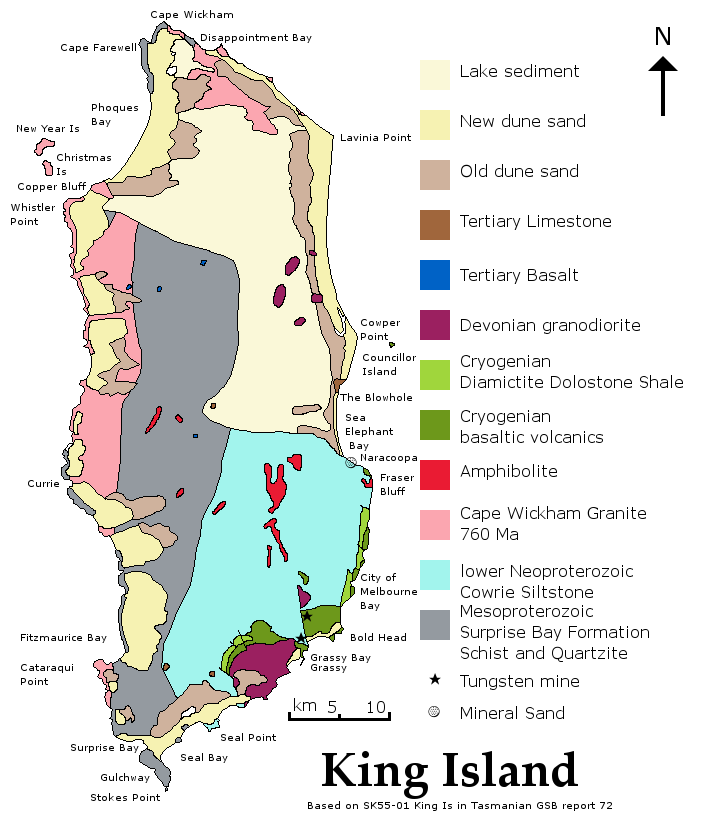
Surface geology of King Island

On King Island now in Bass Strait, the oldest Tasmanian rocks are found. On the west side of King Island, there are basalts that have been metamorphosed by amphibolite grade metamorphism at 1,270 million years ago. Sedimentary rocks such as feldspathic sandstone that have been altered to schist and quartzite. Detrital zircons have been dated to 1350, 1444, 1600, 1768 and 1900 Ma. A dolerite sill was intruded. Granite intruded 760 million years ago in the Cryogenian. The granite contains inherited zircons from 1,800 to 1,200 million years ago. The Wickham deformation affected the earlier rocks by heating to 470 to 480 °C at pressures below 300 MPa, and tight folding. This was followed later in the Neoproterozoic on the eastern side of the island with beds of diamictite, dolomite, mudstone, tholeiite, and picrite interleaved with conglomerate. Also dykes of augite syenite, picrite and 580 Ma tholeiite dolerite were intruded. An interpretation is that deposits occurred in a tidal area, with a continental rift allowing magma from the mantle to intrude. These newer Proterozoic sediments were then tilted and faulted.

The latter tholeiite igneous rocks have a strong magnetic signature, and this can be detected from the rock underneath Bass Strait. The band of rocks is 35 km wide. It extends north northeast to Phillip Island, Victoria, and also south 40 km to just off the west coast of Tasmania stopping at the Braddon River Fault

In the Rocky Cape Block west of Wynyard and north of Granville Harbour, the Precambrian rocks consist of the Rocky Cape Group from the Stenian period, with Cowrie Siltstone, Detention Subgroup, Irby Siltstone, and Jacob Quartzite. The sequence covers most of the block and is over 5700 metres thick. Currents travelled either northwesterly or southeasterly. The metamorphic belt titled the Arthur Lineament forms the limits of the Rocky Cape Group to the south east. The Burnie Formation followed in the Tonian period south east of the lineament with greywacke and slaty mudstone, and also some basic pillow lavas. The Oonah Formation has even more varieties of rock than the Burnie formation, also including conglomerate, quartz sandstone, dolomite and chert. The Bowry Formation in the Cryogenian 780 million years ago was intruded by granite (Bowry granitoids) 777 million years ago. These have been metamorphosed to the blueschist level. In the Smithton Synclinorium the Togari Group followed with conglomerate from the Sturtian and Marinoan glaciations and dolomite marking the end of Cryogenian and on into the Ediacaran and Cambrian. The Togari group contains greywacke, conglomerate, diamictite, mafic volcanic rocks, and quartz sandstone, and mudstone. The components of the Togari Group are called Forest Conglomerate and Quartzite, Black River Dolomite, Kanunnah subgroup (containing the lavas) and Smithton Dolomite. These rocks are important for determining the boundary between the Cryogenian and Ediacaran periods as they contain volcanics that can be dated and dolomites marking the end of glaciations and marking the period boundary.

Near Corinna the Ahrberg group is correlated with the Togari Group and the Success Creek Group. It contains the Donaldson Formation (a marine fan), Savage Dolomite which contains stromatolites; Bernafai Volcanics containing albite epidote actinolite chlorite; Corinna Dolomite, and Tunnelrace Volcanics. Where the dolomite has been dissolved away over millions of years it has left layers of very pure silica flour, an important mineral resource.

The Dundas Element lowest level starts with the Oonah Formation with greywacke, dolomite and basic volcanics. The Oonah Formation appeared between 708 to 690 million years ago. It has three sections, Mount Bischoff Inlier, the Ramsay River Inlier and the Dundas Inlier. The Success Creek Group from the Cryogenian has diamictite, quartz sandstone (Dalcoath Formation), and mudstone. It includes the Renison Bell Formation named after the Renison Bell mine. The red rock member is hematite stained chert. The sediments slumped while soft forming folds and breccia and mélange. They were then capped with limestone. The group is up to 1000 metres thick. The Crimson Creek Formation consists of greywacke with tholeiitic basalt. It is from 4000 to 5000 metres thick. This formation could be as late as the early Cambrian. The basalt is probably the same as mafic lavas of the Kanunnah Subgroup.

The Sheffield Element extends from Wynyard past Devonport and the Asbestos Range on the north coast and as far south east as Golden Valley. It contains structural elements called Dial Range Trough, Forth Massif, Fossey Mountains Trough. The oldest Precambrian rocks are the Ulverstone Metamorphic Complex and Forth Metamorphic Complex. This is assumed to be the same age as metamorphic rocks from the Tyennan Block, at 1,100 million years ago from the Stenian. This contains zircons predominantly dated 1,796 million years ago, but also from 1710, 1851, the oldest being 3,100 million years ago, and the youngest 1,400 million years ago. The Burnie or Oonah Formation with Greywacke is possibly from the Tonian period, dated around 735 ± 35 million years ago. Slate from both the Burnie and Oonah formations is dated at 690 million years ago. Both of these formations came from a shallow marine shelf. The Cooee Dolerite intruded the Burnie Formation at 725 ± 35 million years ago. Zircon grains in the Cooee Dolerite are from mostly 1,700 to 1,800 million years ago.

The Barrington Chert is finely laminated and has flaggy bedding. It is found in the Dial Range and Fossey Mountain Troughs, up to 1 km thick. The Motton Spilite lies on top of the chert. It consists of pillow lava, massive lava flows, sediments made from volcanic fragments, and chert breccia. The basalt is an ocean floor type. The Badger Head Inlier consists of deformed Burnie Formation. The Andersons Creek Ultramafic Complex is west of Beaconsfield and east of the inlier with serpentinite, pyroxenite, gabbro and a sliver of oolitic chert introduced as a fault bounded block. To the west of the Badger Head Inlier is the Port Sorell Formation, a tectonic mélange of marine sediments and dolerite.

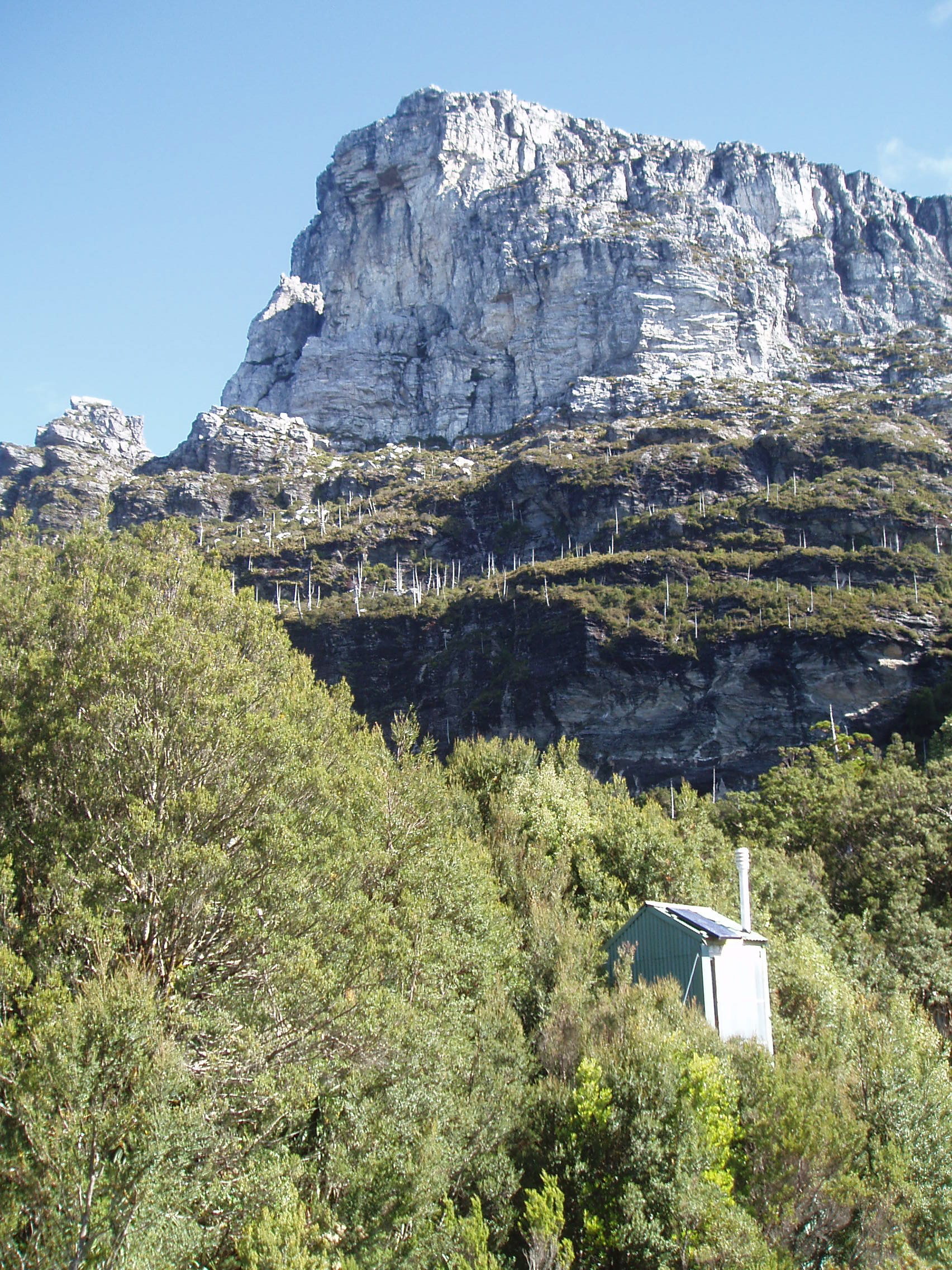
Frenchmans Cap consisting of Precambrian quartzite

In the Tyennan block, the Precambrian basement that forms the central core of Tasmania there are two formations. First, the Oonah Formation contains turbidite with quartz sandstone interbedded with siltstone deposited by gravity flows. This has been deformed with tight folds that have been overturned, and exhibits crenulation cleavage and brittle faulting. Zircons in the quartzite have peak numbers aged 1,681 million years ago and 1,771 million years ago. Secondly, the Scotchfire Metamorphic Complex contains quartzite deposited in the sea from windblown desert sands, schist and phyllite possibly from a delta. Small quantities of dolomite and boulder conglomerate are also included. The complex includes boudinage structure and en echelon veins. Phyllite near Strathgordon has been dated at 1,100 to 1,150 million years ago. Metamorphism to greenschist facies occurred at around 400 °C and 300 MPa. The Franklin Metamorphic Complex is near Mount Franklin. At Raglan Range the rocks are a mixture of quartzite and knotted schist. Metamorphism in this area was higher grade with almandine garnet forming. The Collingwood area experienced the highest grade of metamorphism with garnet-mica schist, mica schist and garnet-mica-kyanite gneiss present, and enough heat to form veins of migmatite. Eclogite and garnet amphibolite are believed to be the remains of basalt. The eclogite has been heated to 700° at 1520 MPa, a burial depth of perhaps 50 km. Metamorphism happened 496 to 515 million years ago at the same time as the Cambrian ultramafic complexes were introduced.

In the Neoproterozoic in the Jane River basin, the very thick Jane River Dolomite appeared.

The Adamsfield Jubilee element is east of the Tyennan Block. It has a strip exposed on the surface that includes the Florentine Synclinorium, The Adamsfield District, the Jubilee Region, and down to the South Coast at Precipitous Bluff and Surprise Bay. It also underlies the Tasmania Basin across southeastern Tasmania, but not including the east coast. The subsurface structure has been studied from a few outliers, boreholes, xenoliths, and gravity and magnetic surveys. The basement at 5 km deep is the same as the Tyennan metamorphic rocks (Scotchfire Metamorphic Complex). Its oldest exposed rocks are from the Clark Group, of pelitic rocks, some with stromatolites, and evaporites, and overlaid with orthoquartzite. The Weld River Group lies above, starting with 0.5 km thickness of conglomerate and sandstone, then up to 3 km of dolomite, interbedded with sandstone, mudstone and diamictite. Glacial dropstones are found in the interbedding, suggesting Cryogenian age, however δ13C profiles suggest Ediacaran age instead. Gravity and magnetic studies indicate that this sort of dolomite (dense and non-magnetic) underlies Hobart and Bruny Island in a north–south strip, and also in a region west of Hobart.

The Cape Sorell Block is a region of metamorphosed sediments from the Mesoproterozoic, to the south of the west end of Macquarie Harbour. It is separated from Neoproterozoic rocks by a low angle thrust fault. The Neoproterozoic rocks contain greywacke, mudstone and pillow lavas of the Lucas Creek Volcanics (matching the Crimson Creek Formation), mudstone, siltstone (matching the Success Creek Group) and dolomite (correlating with the Togari Group). South east of this is a metamorphosed belt of dolomite rich sediments correlated with the Oonah Formation. An ultramafic belt called Point Hibbs Mélange reaches the coast near Point Hibbs. This has been complexly faulted with Cambrian, Ordovician and Devonian sediments and limestone.

At the end of the Precambrian uplift there were several raised blocks forming land above the sea: the Tyennan Uplift in the central and south west Tasmania, the Rocky Cape uplift in the north west, and the Forth uplift, near Forth in the north. The far north west also had uplift as probably also did some region to the east. Basins formed were the Smithton Basin, Dial Range Basin, Fossey Mountain Basin and the Adamsfield Basin.

=== Early Cambrian ===
Next an oceanic arc collided with eastern Australia. This resulted in deep oceanic crust being thrust in a sheet over the top of the Precambrian rocks. This has left behind several ultramafic complexes bounded with faults from the older rocks. These take the form of layered pyroxenite and dunite; layered dunite and harzburgite; and layered pyroxenite, peridotite and gabbro. The layering has developed sedimentary like structures including cross bedding. This has been serpentinised, with magnetite separating out. Several mineral deposits are associated such as osmiridium, and chromium. The ultrabasic rocks are rich in orthopyroxene, which is unusual, usually clinopyroxene is found in such rocks. They were formed at high temperature but low pressure. The Heazlewood Ultramafic Complex solidified at 510 ± 6 million years ago. Other ultramafic occurrences include the Cape Sorell and Serpentine Hill Complexes.

As part of this collision, three exotic suites of basalt were tectonically introduced into the Dundas Block. Near Waratah is a sub-alkaline basalt from an ocean floor, another is a high-magnesium andesite-basalt with chrome spinel and clinoenstatite named boninitic rock after the Bonin Islands. This magma produced the layered pyroxenite dunite in the ultramafic area. Thirdly there is a low titanium basalt-andesite with extreme light rare-earth element depletion that produced the layered pyroxenite-peridotite and associated gabbro cumulate.

Two kinds of basalt from the Birchs Inlet–Mainwaring River Volcanics, occur in a belt north from Veridian Point and west of the south end of Birchs Inlet.

In the Adamsfield area The Ragged Basin Complex is a broken up formation of chert, sandstone, red mudstone and mafic magma derived rocks. The sandstone is derived from metamorphic and volcanic fragments. Ultramafic rocks are serpentinised. They are not ophiolites, but instead are cumulates of heavy minerals in a shallow magma chamber. The densest mineral, osmiridium has been concentrated and mined at Adamsfield. These rocks are allochthonous, meaning that they were inserted into position by tectonic processes.

=== Cambrian ===
==== Mount Read Volcanics ====
The Mount Read Volcanics are a 250 km long belt that is 10 to 20 km wide attached to the western edge of the Tyennan Block or eastern side of the Dundas Element. The volcanics consist of underwater eruptions interbedded with sediment. A range of lava from basic through intermediate to acid are present along with intrusions and volcanic clastics such as breccia and pumice. The breccia includes pieces of andesite, dacite and massive sulfide. The massive sulfides were formed by hot springs on the sea floor. These have become ore deposits for copper, lead, zinc and silver. The volcanics extend south to Elliot Bay. The Noddy Creek Volcanics extend north of high Rocky Point to Macquarie Harbour with pyroxene and feldspar containing andesite as lava, breccia and intrusives.

The Sticht Range Beds form a sedimentary base sitting on the Tyennan Block metamorphic rocks. Parts of the volcanics were from 502.6 ± 3.5 million years ago, and the younger Tyndall Groups has a dating of 494 ± 3.8 million years ago. Fossils also indicate a late middle Cambrian age. Zircons in the volcanics have two age groups: 1,600 to 800 million years ago matching the metamorphic rock in the Tyennan block; and 600 to 530 million years ago without a satisfactory explanation.

In the Dial Range Trough the middle Cambrian saw the deposition of the Cateena Group of conglomerate (of purple mudstone pebbles), sandstone with feldspar, mudstone and greywacke and some felsic volcanics. The age is Florian to Undillan. This was followed by the Radfords Creek Group which has a base of a conglomerate of chert and basalt fragments. The age is Boomerangian to Late Mindyallan.

In the Adamsfield area the Trial Ridge Beds, Island Road Formation, and Boyd River Formation consists of conglomerate and greywacke. They contain fossils of agnostoids.

==== Cambrian granites ====
The Murchison Granite intruded east of the Mount Read Volcanics. It consists of dioritic granodiorite. Major mineral deposits were formed at Mount Lyell, Rosebery and Henty. Granite also intruded in the Cambrian at Low Rocky Point and Elliott Bay.

The north west element was altered by the Tyennan Orogeny around 500 million years ago. The Arthur Lineament was metamorphosed to phyllite, slate and schistose quartzite, The Burnie and Oonah Formation were folded in various ways, and the Rocky Cape Group and the Smithton Synclinorium developed cleavage texture. The Tyennan Orogeny corresponds with the first phase of the Delamerian Orogeny in South Australia and the Ross Orogeny in North Victoria Land, Antarctica.

The Dove Granite intruded the Tyennan Block metamorphics with several small plugs in the north dated at 483 ± 35 million years ago.

==== Dundas Group ====
The Dundas group are Cambrian sedimentary beds that interfinger with the Mount Read Volcanics. They lie unconformably on the Precambrian basement. The kind of rock is sandstone, laminated mudstone and a pebble conglomerate in which the pebbles consist of quartzite, sandstone and green mudstone. The group was formed as a submarine fan. The conglomerate includes volcanic fragments where it borders the Mount Read Volcanics, indicating that it was deposited at the same time. The Huskisson Group is from the same time period.

In the Smithton Synclinorium the Scopus Formation is from the same period between Boomerangian and Idamean. The rocks are wacke and mudstone in a submarine fan with currents flowing to the north. A channel is marked by conglomerate. Most of the material came from volcanics, but also included grit from the older Precambrian rocks.

The Fossey Mountains Trough contains Cambrian intermediate volcanics, and greywacke where trilobite fossils show the age as late Middle Cambrian. Boomerangian age fossils were found in Paradise.

=== Ordovician ===
During the Ordovician Tasmania was near the equator and was joined to Gondwana. The Tyennan Block was uplifted with the Great Lyell Scarp as an active fault.

The Ordovician Wurawina supergroup comprises the Denison Group and the Gordon group. The Owen Conglomerate, part of the Denison group, lies conformably on the Dundas Group, but unconformably on the Mount Read Volcanics. The pebbles include quartz, quartzite, quartz sandstone, pale pink mudstone and chert, embedded in a matrix of sand. The Owen Group rocks are found on the West Coast Range. The conglomerate was derived from the highlands of the uplifted Tyennan Block and is up to 1500 meters thick. The lowest section is the Jukes Conglomerate, with Lower Owen Conglomerate and Middle Owen Conglomerate above. Upper Owen Sandstone is found in Queenstown, it formed while the Great Lyell Fault was active, resulting in folding of the lower parts. The Pioneer Beds are the top layer, containing chert and chromite. Correlated rocks also occur in a syncline south west of Birchs Inlet, around the upper part of the Wanderer River, and in the Dial Range Trough the equivalent unit is called the Duncan Conglomerate. The Duncan Conglomerate has pebbles mostly of chert, but also some of quartzite, hematite and lava. On the west side of the Dial Range trough at Penguin the Beecraft Megabreccia sits on top of the Burnie Formation. It consists of blocks of chert up to 120 metres long, embedded in conglomerate. The Teatree Point Megabreccia is similar and about 150 metres thick. The Lobster Creek Volcanics is actually an intrusion of plagioclase pyroxene hornblende porphyry dated at 480 ± 18 million years ago.

Conglomerate and sandstone in the Fossey Mountains Trough is exposed in a band on Black Bluff Range, Mount Roland, and Gog Range. Another band runs through Saint Valentines Peak, Loyetea, Gunns Plains to the Dial Range. On top of this is sandstone, a dolerite sill, and basalts altered to chlorite and hematite. These units are called the Roland Conglomerate and Moina Sandstone and represent contrasting stratigraphic architecture to that observed in western Tasmania, a reflection of evolution of different rift depocentres.

The Gordon limestone belongs to the Gordon group. It is formed over western Tasmania and is conformable on the Owen Conglomerate and lies unconformably over the Precambrian rocks north of Zeehan. The limestone occurs in the Dundas and Sheffield Elements and the Florentine Synclinorium. The conditions of its formation were in or near the intertidal zone. The time of its formation was between early Caradoc and mid Ashgill. A type section is at Mole Creek. The Flowery Gully Limestone near Beaconsfield started deposition at an earlier time Llanvirn or Llandeilo than the limestones further west.

In the central north of the Sheffield element is the Early Arenig age Caroline Creek Sandstone on a bed of chert conglomerate. The Cabbage Tree Formation is east of the Andersons Creek Ultramafic Complex, and is sandstone and conglomerate.

In North east Tasmania the Mathinna Group starts in the Ordovician with Stony Head Sandstone, a quartz sandstone formed in turbidity flows. Turquoise Bluff Slate formed from shale. Fossils are rare (mostly sparse graptolites), and ages hard to determine.

The Wurawina Supergroup formed in the Duck Creek Syncline amongst other places. This syncline is oriented east–west, located on the west coast south of the mouth of the Pieman River. It consists of conglomerate equivalent to Mount Zeehan Conglomerate, sandstone, siltstone, shale and micrite equivalent to the Gordon Group, and finally equivalents to the Eldon Group (to Devonian). The Wurawina Supergroup also occurs in the Adamsfield Element with the Denison Group consisting of Singing Creek Formation (of quartzawacke), Great Dome Sandstone, Reeds Conglomerate, Squirrel Creek Formation. Then above this the Gordon Group consists of Karmberg Limestone, Cashions Creek Limestone, Benjamin Limestone, and Arndell Sandstone all from shallow marine conditions. Limestones are also found at Lune River, Precipitous Bluff and produced in deeper water at Surprise Bay on the south Coast.

=== Silurian ===
The Mathinna Group continued in the Silurian period with Bellingham Formation and Sidling Sandstone. In western Tasmania, after the Gordon Group came the Eldon Group consisting of Crotty Quartzite, Amber Slate, Keel Quartzite, Austral Creek Siltstone, Florence Quartzite and Bell Shale. The time of the Eldon group is between Aeronian and Pragian, but with a depositional gap in the Ludlow and early Pridoli.

In the Adamsfield element is the Tiger Range Group with Gell Quartzite, Richea Siltstone, Currawong Quartzite and possibly McLeod Creek Formation. Upper layers have been removed by erosion.

=== Devonian ===
In early to mid Devonian the Tabberabban Orogeny compressed Tasmania in the east–west direction. Reverse faults were activated, and folding with axes running north west and north-north east were formed. Tight folds were formed with axes in the north–south direction at first. Later folding in the northwest to west-northwest direction was superimposed. Faulting relieved some stress and cleavage developed in the rocks. In the Fossey Mountains Trough, the intersecting folds have made dome and basin shaped structures. Uplift and erosion occurred. A quartz-feldspar porphyry intruded the Timbs Group in the southern Arthur Lineament at 380 ± 6 million years ago.

In the north east of Tasmania the Mathinna Group received its last deposits in the form of turbidites in the Bellingham Formation and Sidling Sandstone containing more feldspar.

Granites were intruded in the east of Tasmania around 395 to 368 million years ago. The St Marys Porphyrite is an ash flow of dacite from 388 ± 1 million years ago. Three large batholiths are in the north east: Scottsdale, Eddystone and Blue Tier. Gravity measurements show that granite underlies most of north east Tasmania at depth. Its western edge is a shelf running from Noland Bay in the north to Great Oyster Bay on the east coast. Granite also underlies the east coast with outcrops on Freycinet Peninsula, Maria Island, and Tasman Peninsula and the Hyppolite Rocks. The eastern Bass Strait Islands also show large exposures of granite, including Flinders, Cape Barren, and Clarke Island. Even the Tasmanian islands in the far north of Bass Strait are composed of granite, including Rodondo Island, Moncoeur Island, Kent Group including Deal Island, and Judgement Rocks. Hogan Island and Curtis Island. These islands formed a land bridge in the last ice age and butt up against Wilsons Promontory in Victoria. In the Blue Tier Granite, granodiorite came first. Adamellite intruded, named Mount Pearson Pluton and feeding the St Marys Porphyrite at 398 to 388 million years ago. A second stage of adamellite came at 408 million years ago and alkali-feldspar granite derived by fractional crystallisation followed at 374 to 364 million years ago. Similar ages and sequences of types apply to the other batholiths. In the batholiths there are quartz-feldspar porphyry and dolerite dykes. S-type granite is only found for sure in the Eddystone Batholith in the most extreme north east. Away from the east the I-type granite proportion increases.

Veins of gold were crystallised in the Mathinna-Alberton Gold Lineament, a line from Scottsdale to Blue Tier. The Scamander field originated from the edge of the Mount Pearson biotite adamellite-granite pluton, containing tungsten–molybdenum, tin–copper and silver–lead–zinc veins.

Folding and foliation occurred in northeast Tasmania during the Devonian after the granites appeared.

The Eldon Group finished forming in a shallow marine environment with quartz sandstone and mudstone lying conformably on the Gordon Group rocks. Fossils include brachiopods, gastropods, bryozoans, and tentaculites.

==== Granite ====
In the west of the state there were thirteen small granitic intrusions around 367 ± 10 million years ago. The western plutons were associated with mineralization at Zeehan.

The Heemskirk Granite is a D-shaped double intrusion of 120 km^{2}. It has two parts, one part red, and another white granite that intrudes the red, it is high in tourmaline. Mineralisation from the Heemskirk Granite with cassiterite or tin and tungsten skarn, or silver lead and zinc veins occur in the Zeehan field. The Pieman Granite is a similar age at 347 ± 9 million years ago, but without useful mineral deposits. The Cox Bight granite is white aged at 376 ± 10 million years ago. The South West Cape Granite is dated at 319 ± 10 million years ago. It is foliated and white to cream with biotite and feldspar in large crystals.

The Meredith Batholith contains biotite adamellite. It contains ten separate plutons. A contact aureole of 2.5 km thickness surrounds the batholith in the form of albite epidote hornfels. The granite formed 366 to 338.5 million years ago. Geophysical exploration and a borehole has revealed a large granite mass a kilometer below Zeehan, Renison, Dundas, Rosebery mineral fields. This is the Heemskirk–Granite Tor subsurface ridge. Lamprophyre dykes near Queenstown is 363 ± 3 million years ago. The Grandfathers Granite is an adamellite under 2 km deep south and offshore from Cape Sorell. It has a few isolated outcrops on the surface. Lamprophyre dykes and sheets have intruded at Hibbs Bay and nearby on the south west coast 373.4 ± 4.1 million years ago.

The Housetop Granite outcrops over 120 km^{2} at the western end of the Sheffield Element. It is a biotite granite solidified 380 to 343 million years ago. It produced some mineral veins with lead, silver, zinc, copper and tin-tungsten skarn at Kara. The Dolcoath Granite outcrops near Cethana but extends underground to the west. It has produced magnetite–fluorite–vesuvianite mineral deposits at Moina, and tin tungsten bismuth veins at the Shepherd and Murphy Mine. The Beulah Granite outcrops near Paradise and Beulah and it extends underground to the north and west.

Granite Tor Granite as it appears on the surface is just a small part of a large buried granite body that may connect with the Heemskirk Granite. Its age is 359 ± 15 million years ago.

=== Carboniferous ===
On the eastern side of King Island some small stocks of granite with dykes intruded. The granites are adamellite-granodiorite with large crystals of K-feldspar. They are around 350 million years ago. They are known as Grassy Granodiorite, and Bold Head Adamellite in the south east, and Sea Elephant Adamellite on the north east is richer in feldspar.

Megakinking caused shortening in the NNW-SSE direction in north east Tasmania with blocks up to 9 km across rotated.

=== Permian ===
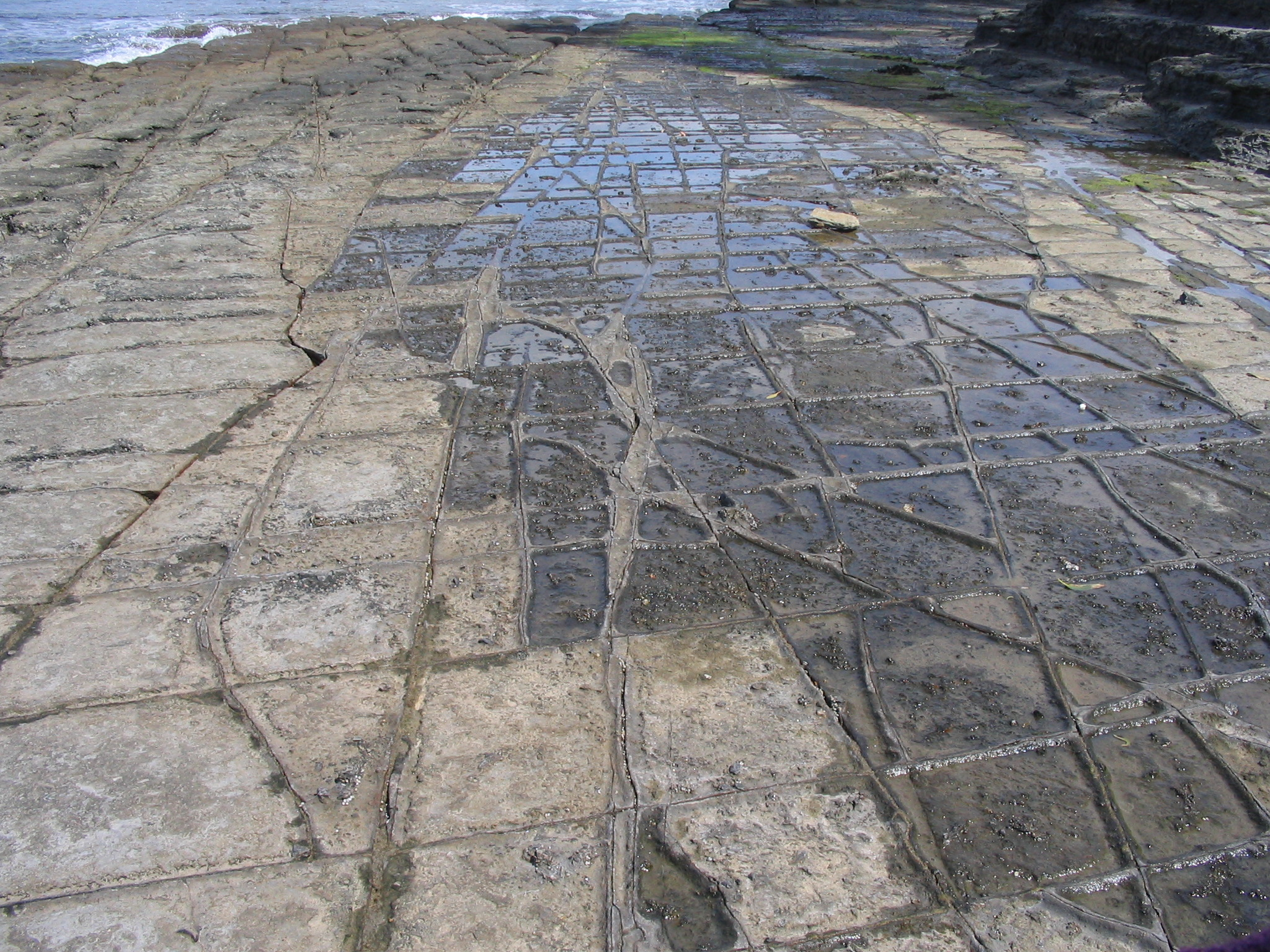
Tessellated Pavement, a Permian bedding plane

In the Permian, glacial conditions predominated with, icecaps on the land, and ice floating on the sea, as a result of which tillite is found at the base of the Permian deposits. Mudstone with dropstones was formed in the sea areas, particularly in the eastern half of Tasmania. This eastern zone is known as the Tasmania Basin. The rocks are undeformed and cover the central part of the state, most of the east coast, down to the south coast, and with extensions to the north coast near Launceston and Devonport. What is now visible has been reduced by erosion.

The Permian and Triassic deposits together are known as the Parmeener Super Group. The lowest levels are a discontinuous dark grey pebbly tillite up to several hundreds of meters thick. It has been found at Cygnet (Truro Tillite), Glenorchy, Margate, Woodbridge, Maydena, Shoemaker Point and Hastings. Mount Anne, Mount Mueller, and Mount Wedge are the most south west extension of the tillite. In the north it occurs at Wynyard as the Wynyard Tillite. In the west is the Zeehan Tillite. The broken fragments of rocks are often faceted and scratched, and can be up to boulder sized. They are embedded in rock flour and silt. The ice that brought the till flowed from the west of Tasmania in an easterly direction. The tillite may have started appearing in the Late Carboniferous.

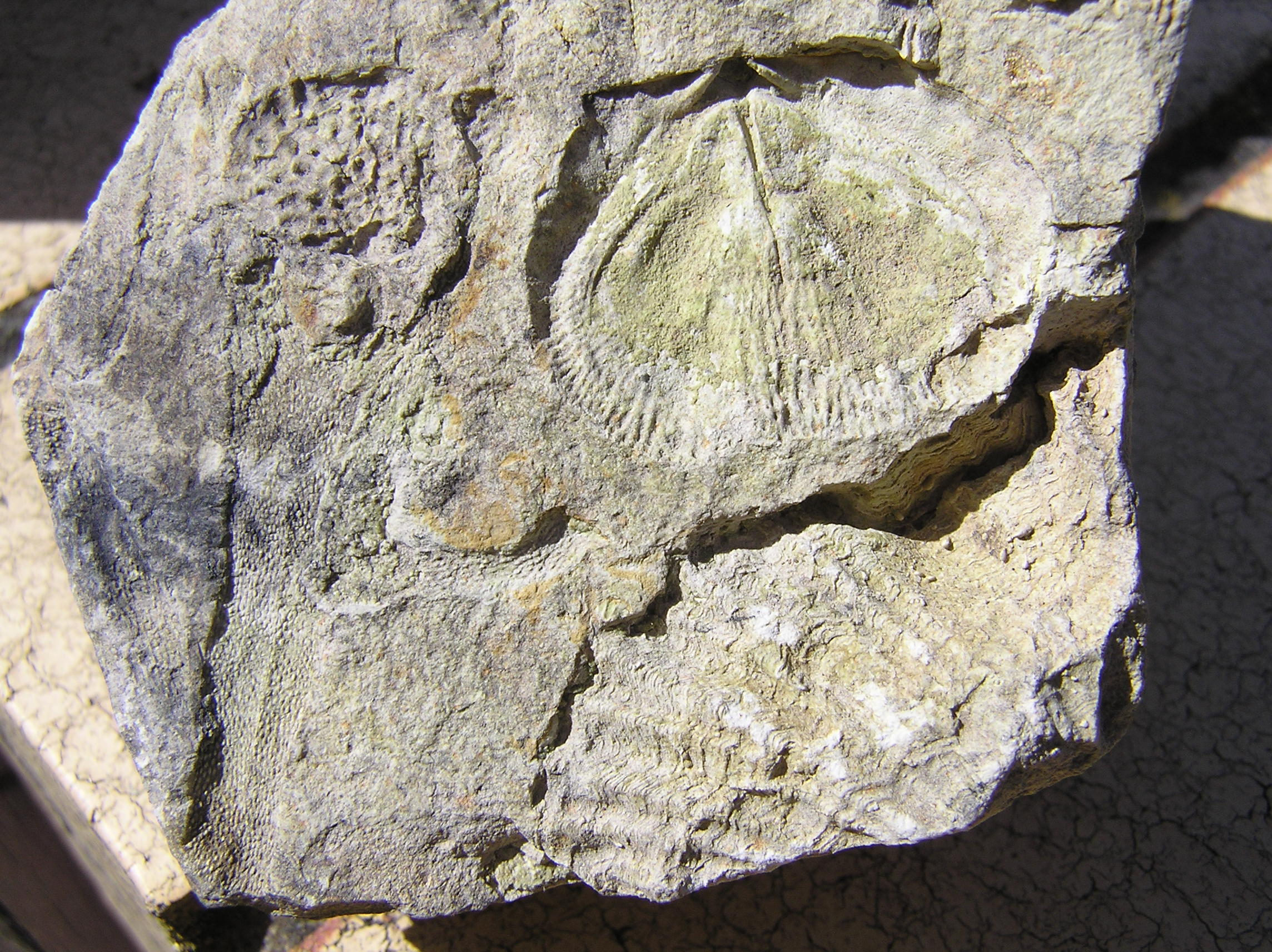
Fossils from Permian mudstone

Siltstone with varves is found at Maydena, it is called laminite. Above the tillite is massive mudstone and siltstone with occasional dropstones, the Woody Island Siltstone in southern Tasmania and Quamby Mudstone in the northern half. The upper levels of the marine sequence are siltstone and sandstone with frequent dropstones and fossils. These are the Bundella Formation and Golden Valley Group. Oil shale forms a layer in the north and at Douglas River in the east. The shale is known as tasmanite. Above this are freshwater deposits of conglomerate, sandstone with pebbles, siltstone with quartz or mica. These freshwater beds can be up to 30m thick. They are called Faulkner Group, the Liffey Group and the Mersey coal Measures. Above this in south east Tasmania are more marine units that include Nassau Formation Berriedale Limestone, up to 60 m thick, siltstone and sandstone rich in fossils and dropstones (Malbina Formation, and Deep Bay Formation), and the upper part is dark grey siltstone rich in dropstones. The very top layers are coloured black, probably from an estuary (Risdon Sandstone and the Abels Bay Formation). Felsic volcanic ash is found near the top of the sequence of sediments.

Fresh water deposits form the Upper Parmeener Super Group. The layer commence with poorly cemented sandstone, mudstone, carbonaceous mudstone and coal (Cygnet Coal Measures). Glossopteris is frequently found as well as Dulhuntyspora. In the past coal was mined at Mount Cygnet and Adventure Bay and at Mount Ossa. These sandstones were laid down by east flowing rivers.

=== Triassic ===
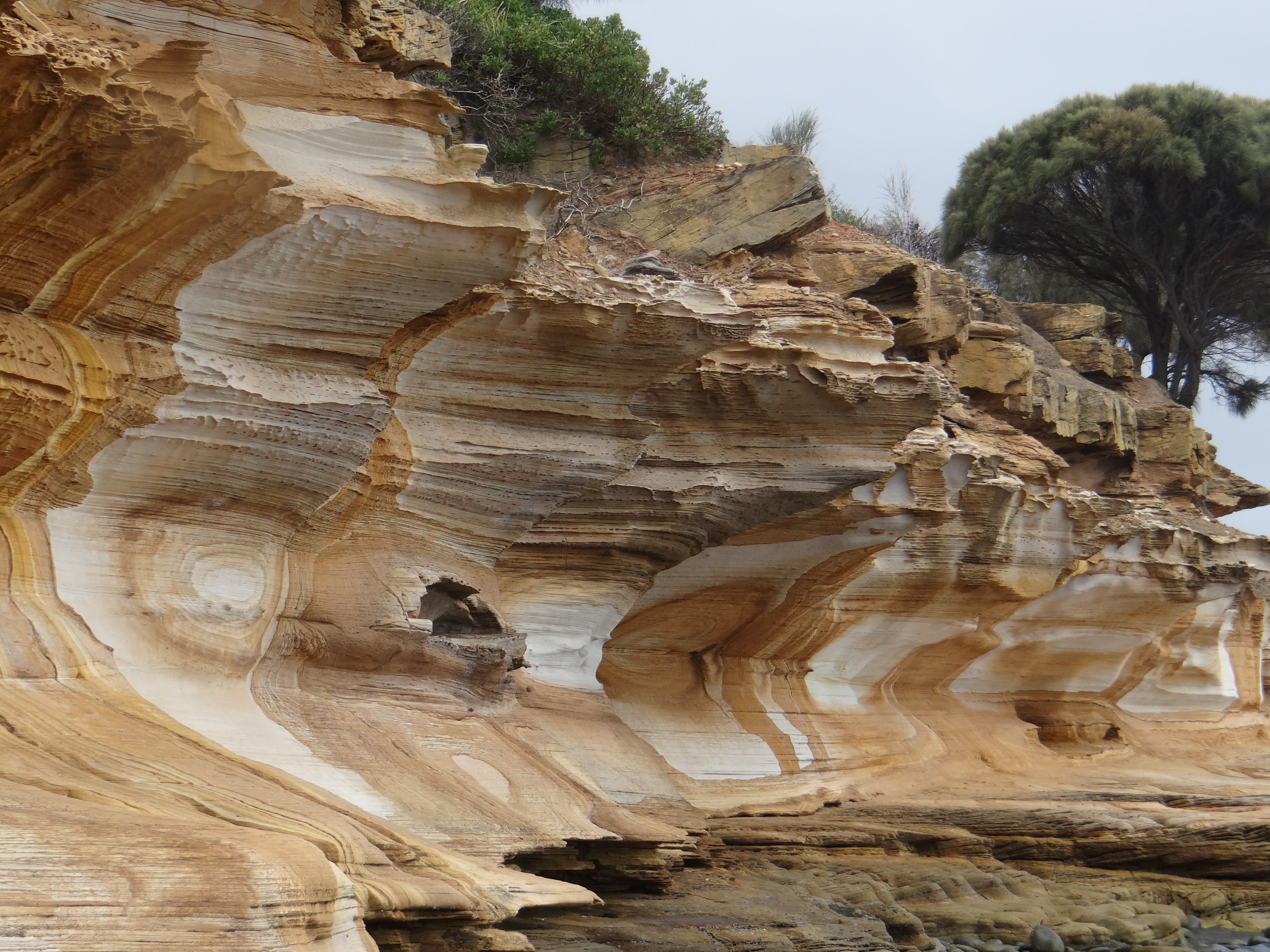
Triassic sandstone at Painted Cliffs on Maria Island

Continental conditions resulted in sandstone deposits, which represent the upper layers of the Parmeener Super Group. The lowest levels are a sparkling clean quartz sandstone free of coal. The uppermost parts have sandstone and beds of coal. Coal was mined at Newtown, Kaoota, Mount Lloyd, Strathblane, and on the Tasman Peninsula. The sandstone has also been heavily used as building stone.

At St Marys there were two volcanic eruptions of alkali-olivine basalt at 233 ± 5 million years ago. Tuff from calc-alkaline volcanoes to the east of Tasmania produced some layers in the upper sediments. An ashfall tuff in the Denison Rivulet area of eastern Tasmania is dated at 214 ± 1 million years ago (Late Triassic).

=== Jurassic ===
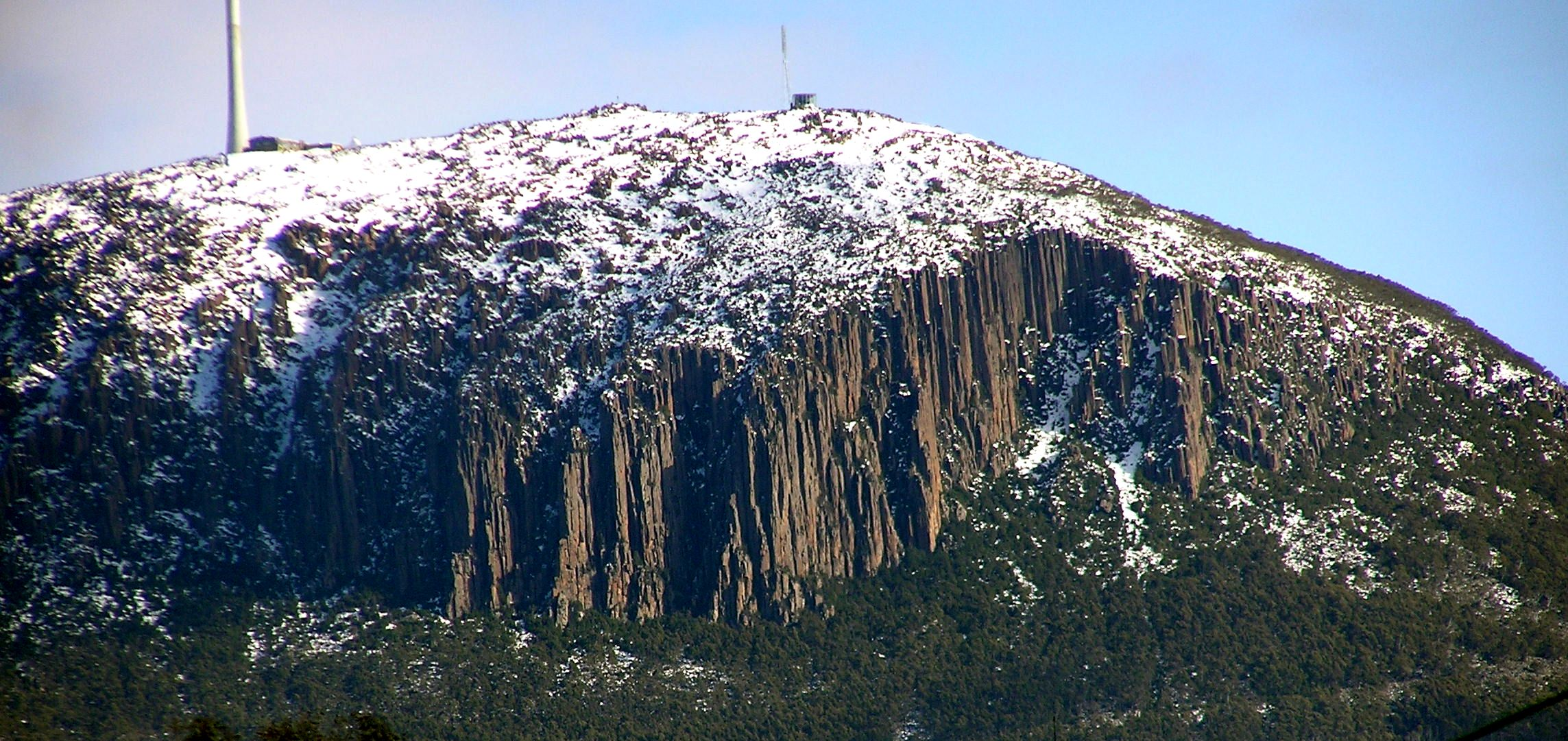
Organ Pipes on Mount Wellington are columnar jointed dolerite

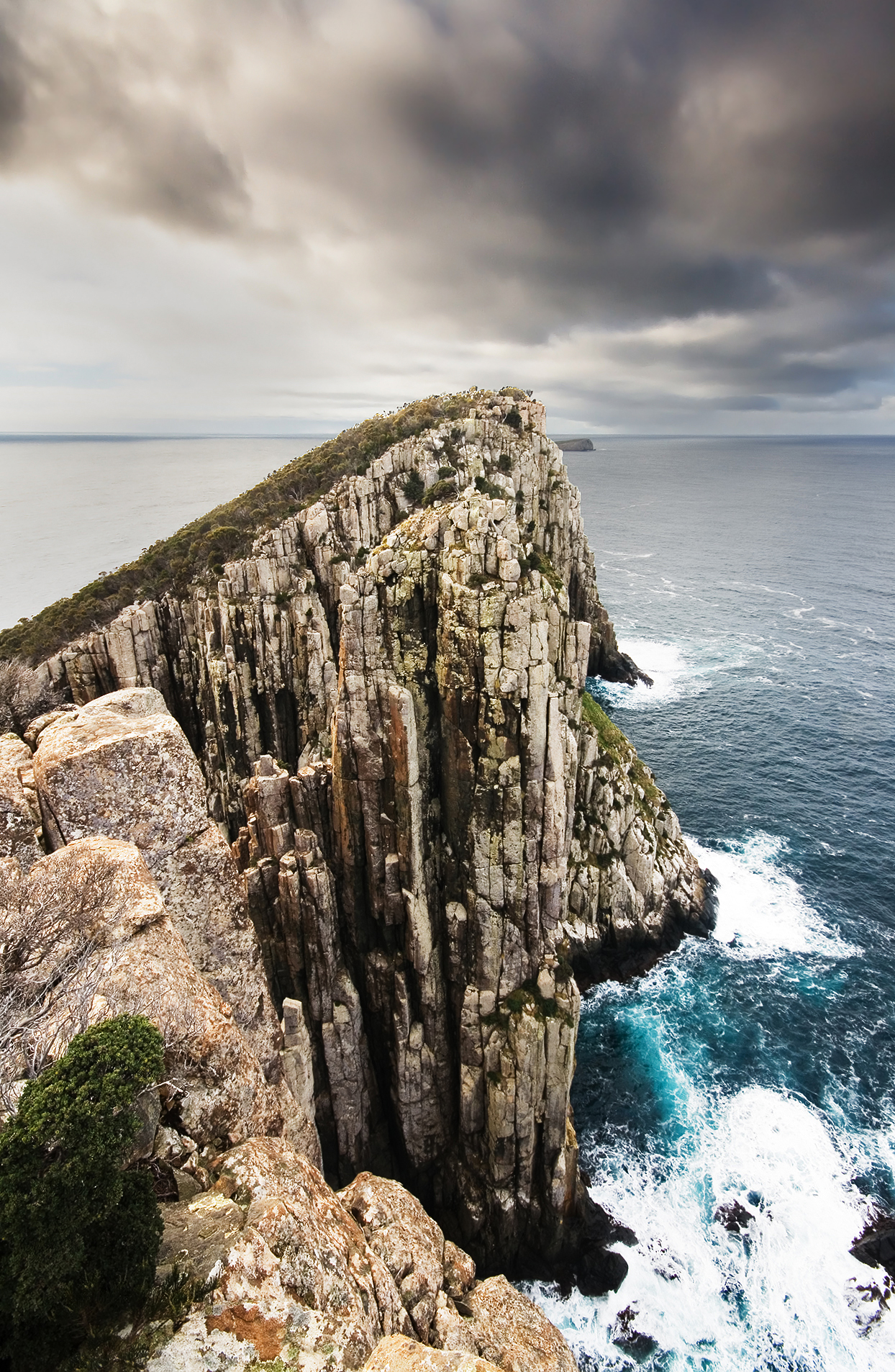
The Candlestick, Tasman Peninsula, composed of Jurassic dolerite

A major intrusion of dolerite occurred in the Jurassic. This was a widespread phenomena covering over one third of Tasmania, and possibly more in the past. This intrusion also affected Antarctica, Argentina and South Africa at 183 million years ago. This has been called the Karoo-Ferrar large igneous province. Three to five million cubic kilometers of magma were intruded overall, being the planet's fourth largest known magma intrusion. This may have been the cause of the Toarcian extinction through a consequent oceanic anoxic event. Henrik Svensen claimed that the magma baked coal and oil shale producing up to 27.4 teratonnes of carbon dioxide, some of which entered the Earth's atmosphere.

Tasmania has the largest exposure of dolerite in the world of 30000 km^{2} and a volume of 15000 km^{3}. In Tasmania the rock is characteristic of many mountains with its columnar joining and dark blue grey colour. The composition is 40% plagioclase, 20% clinopyroxene, 20% quartz, 5% ilmenite and small percentages of potassium feldspar and amphibole. The rock is altered by water to smectite and kaolinite with quartz being left unaltered. The soil surface concentrates zirconium and titanium. The soils on dolerite also contain nodules of hematite and may contain a buried layer of stones called a stone line.

Most of the intrusions are in the form of sills up to 500 m thick. Mostly the sills are in the Parmeener Super Group rocks. There are also stepped sills, inclined sheets, cones and some dykes. Closely adjacent country rocks were metamorphosed to hornfels. The upper parts of sills may be more coarsely grained. Dolerite is crushed to use as road metal, and aggregate.

Mount Anne, Mount Mueller, and Mount Wedge in the south west are capped in dolerite, where it also makes contact with Precambrian rocks.

It appears that the magma came from the crust rather than the mantle. Solidification occurred at 174.5 ± 8 million years ago.

A Jurassic forest was buried in an andesitic volcanic eruption at Lune River. Here, beneath the lava flow, is mudstone with fossil wood and leaves.

On King Island, there was an intrusion of a biotite lamprophyre dyke at 143 million years ago. Xenoliths of granulite-facies metamorphic rock resemble those found in eastern Antarctica.

=== Cretaceous ===
In the Cretaceous continental breakup of Gondwana started near Tasmania. About 83 million years ago a rift entered the east coast of Tasmania from the south and split off the Lord Howe Rise. Sea floor spreading continued to move this continental sliver away to the east from Tasmania and Australia, and the rift jumped into the Lord Howe Rise and separated off the East Tasman Plateau. This East Tasman Plateau microcontinent was originally off the southeast of Tasmania; it is a circular piece of continental rocks surrounded by oceanic crust. Volcanism occurred there 36 million years ago. In the Cretaceous Bass Strait was stretched and thinned and became filled with water. Vulcanism occurred in the Bass Basin. Flowering plants moved into Tasmania about 90 million years ago. At these times Tasmania was still connected to Antarctica with the southwest abutting Oates Land and the Wilson Hills. South from Tasmania is an extension of continental crust called the South Tasman Rise. The Gilbert Seamount was split from the South Tasman Rise by sea floor spreading about 77 million years ago.

This extension created a number of sedimentary basins: Bass, Durroon, Gippsland, Otway and Sorell Basins. They each contain several kilometres of sediment from the late Mesozoic to Cenozoic time periods. Bass Basin, between King Island, and north from the Tamar River, has up to 12 km of sediment, actually starting from the Jurassic. The lowest layer is the Otway Group of sandstone made from rock fragments. The Eastern View Coal Measures follow. The Latrobe Group found in the Otway Basin, closer to Victoria, is from the same time and produces the oil found in the area. From Late Paleocene to early Eocene there was an unconformity. A shale from Demons Bluff Formation follows in the Eocene, deposited in calm sea water. The Torquay Group reaches from Oligocene to the current day, with marl and limestone formed in open sea water.

The Durroon Basin is south east of the Bass Basin. Late Cretaceous rocks are conglomerate, with sandstones above. From 125 to 100 million years ago there was a high thermal gradient of 55° per km. Around 60 million years ago there was uplift and erosion of 900 m of sediment called Southern Ocean breakup unconformity. A layer of olivine basalt lies on this, followed by carbonaceous shale for 300 m called Durroon Mudstone 93 to 85 million years ago. This was deposited in a lake. Non marine sediment follow from Cretaceous, through Paleocene to Eocene 83 to 40 million years ago. From 40 to 33 million years ago the Demons Bluff Formation sandstone formed, and finally the Torquay Group with more sandstone and shale than in the Bass Basin.

Rocks from the Cretaceous include syenite porphyry sills and dykes near Cygnet around 100 million years ago. They intrude the Lower Parmeener Group rocks, and dolerite. There are two kinds of composition, one is high alkali, alumina, silicon and barium containing melanite garnet; the other is high in potassium with nepheline and hauyne. This rock is banatite. Clay from this was mined at Police point, and there are also some gold deposits. There is likely to be a giant laccolith of syenite below Cygnet.

Cape Portland is host to andesite, lamprophyre and porphyrite intrusions and eruptions from 102.3 to 101.3 million years ago. Musselroe Bay nearby has a lamprophyre and basalt from 98.7 ± 0.8 million years ago.

=== Cenozoic ===
==== Pre-Quaternary ====
===== Tectonics =====
Tasmania finally disconnected from Antarctica 45 million years ago. Several basins were formed by faulting. Faulting was connected with continental breakup. Most faulting was finished by the Eocene, but the Sorell Basin continued into the Oligocene. Cenozoic age deposits are found in the northern midlands (Tamar Graben), and south of Macquarie Harbour in the Macquarie Harbour Graben. In the south east are the Derwent Graben and the Coal River Graben. Thick layers of Cenozoic rocks are found in the estuary of the Derwent River, D'Entrecasteaux Channel, Sandy Bay, Taroona, Middleton, Craigow Hill, and Spring Bay. The rocks are mostly siltstone and clay. The deep estuary rocks are from the Paleocene. Travertine is found at Geilston Bay. Silcrete and laterite from this time is found too.

The Macquarie Harbour graben deposits dating from Palaeocene and Eocene are poorly consolidated sand, and gravel, with some beds of lignite and clay. Sediments are up to 500 meters thick, with the lowest layers consisting of dolerite boulders.

The Tamar Graben was an extension to the south of the Bass Basin onto the Tasmanian island. Sediments started in the graben at the very end of the Cretaceous, and into the Paleocene and Eocene with conglomerate, sandstone, mudstone and lignite. Basalt and conglomerate is buried south of White Hills. There is Eocene carbonaceous silt. The Longford Sub-basin extends inland south of the Tamar Graben, and is filled with 800 m of clay, sand and gravel, with some basalt towards the top layers, mostly from the Eocene.

The Devonport-Port Sorell Sub-Basin was formed in Paleocene with carbonaceous mudstone and sandstone. The Thirlstane Basalt is above at 38 million years ago, an alkali-olivine basalt. Then the Wesley Vale Sand follows, and the Moriarty Basalt is 50 meters thick at 29.5 million years ago.

The Sorell Basin forms the continental shelf off the west coast. It has sub-basins of King Island, Sandy Cape, Strahan, and Port Davey which were formed in the Early Cretaceous. The King Island Basin is terminated on the east by a normal fault. It is south of King Island and north west of Tasmania. It has a basement of the Rocky Cape Group from the Proterozoic. The first sediments are red conglomerate beds for 190 m. mid-Upper Cretaceous sandstone and mudstone follow, the same age as the Sherbrook Group. Then more conglomerate sandstone and mudstone matching the Wangerrip Group up to early Eocene. Quartz sandstone is above this, with marl, mudstone and limestone from Oligocene and Miocene age. There is an unconformity at the Pliocene base. Approximately 4 km of sediment is found in each subbasin.

===== Sea level =====
The sea level was high in the very early Miocene, and sandstone and calcarenite deposits are up to 30 meters above sea level in the north west and on King Island. In the late early Miocene sea level was up to 100 meters higher than now. There is Pliocene limestone on Flinders Island just above sea level. The Scottsdale sub-basin is up to 225 meters thick from the late Oligocene to early Miocene.

===== Basalt =====
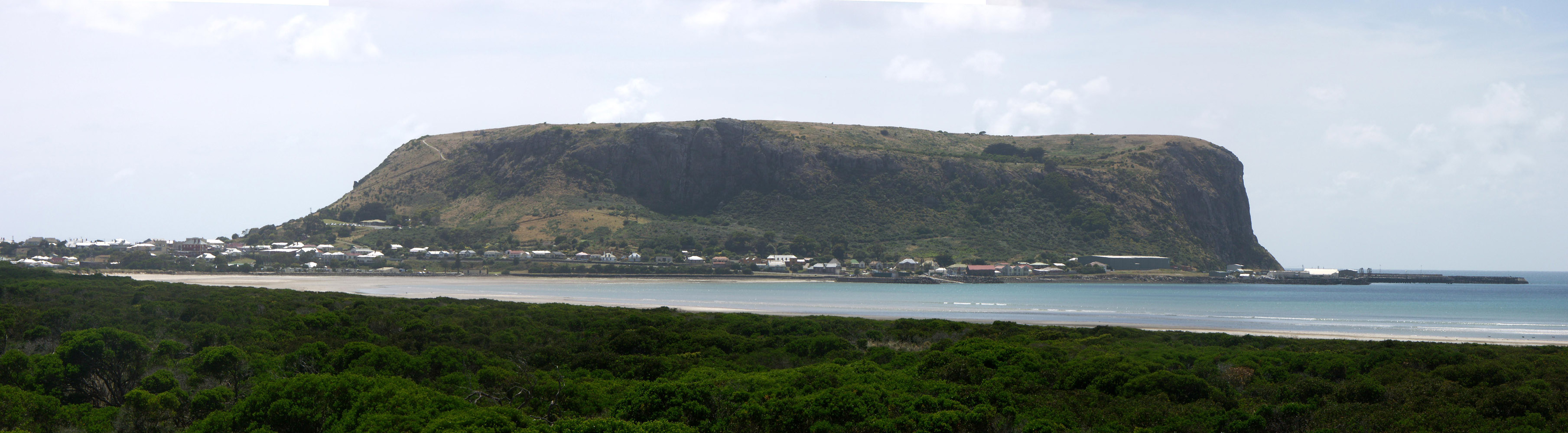
The Nut, a volcanic plug near Stanley

Volcanic vents opened up 58 to 8 million years ago. Lava flows of basalt up to 20 meters thick were formed. Some volcanoes were explosive with bombs, and pyroclastic tuff. The eruptions are probably from the Oligocene and Miocene. The earliest eruption was at Bream Creek on the east coast at 58.5 million years ago. From Weldborough it is 47 million years ago but mostly eroded.

In the south east, basalt from Sandy Bay dates from 26.5 ± 0.3 million years ago. Campania has an alkali basalt from 24.2 million years ago but it also has younger flows of olivine tholeiites. From near Hobart there is olivine basalt from 23 million years ago.

In north east Tasmania, there are many lava flows from middle Eocene to early Miocene. There are at least four types: alkali olivine basalt, quartz tholeiite 30.7 million years ago, alkaline basalt, and olivine nephelinite. Lava flows in the north east flowed down valleys to the sea.

In the north west, there was so much lava that valleys filled and overflowed. A plain resulted with up to 750 meters thickness, and maximum extent south of Wynyard and Burnie. In the late Eocene and early Oligocene lakes were formed near Waratah. Older alkaline basalt in the north west is from 26.3 million years ago, at Table Cape basanite from 13.3 million years ago and at Stanley basanite is dated to 12.5 million years ago and 8.5 million years ago. Mount Cameron West has olivine basalt from 15.5 and 14.4 Ma.

On the southern part of the Central Plateau, there are olivine melilite nephelinite, olivine nephelinite, quartz tholeiite lava flows. These ran south down tributaries of the Derwent River 24.3 to 22.4 million years ago. On the east side of the Central Plateau an olivine nephelinite is from 24.9 million years ago, and a flow of nepheline hawaiite is from 24.2 million years ago. In the western Midlands there is basalt from 36.3 million years ago, and hawaiites from 25 and 24.3 million years ago.

Around Launceston, igneous rocks were intruded into Cenozoic sediments forming dolerite and monzonite.

==== Quaternary ====
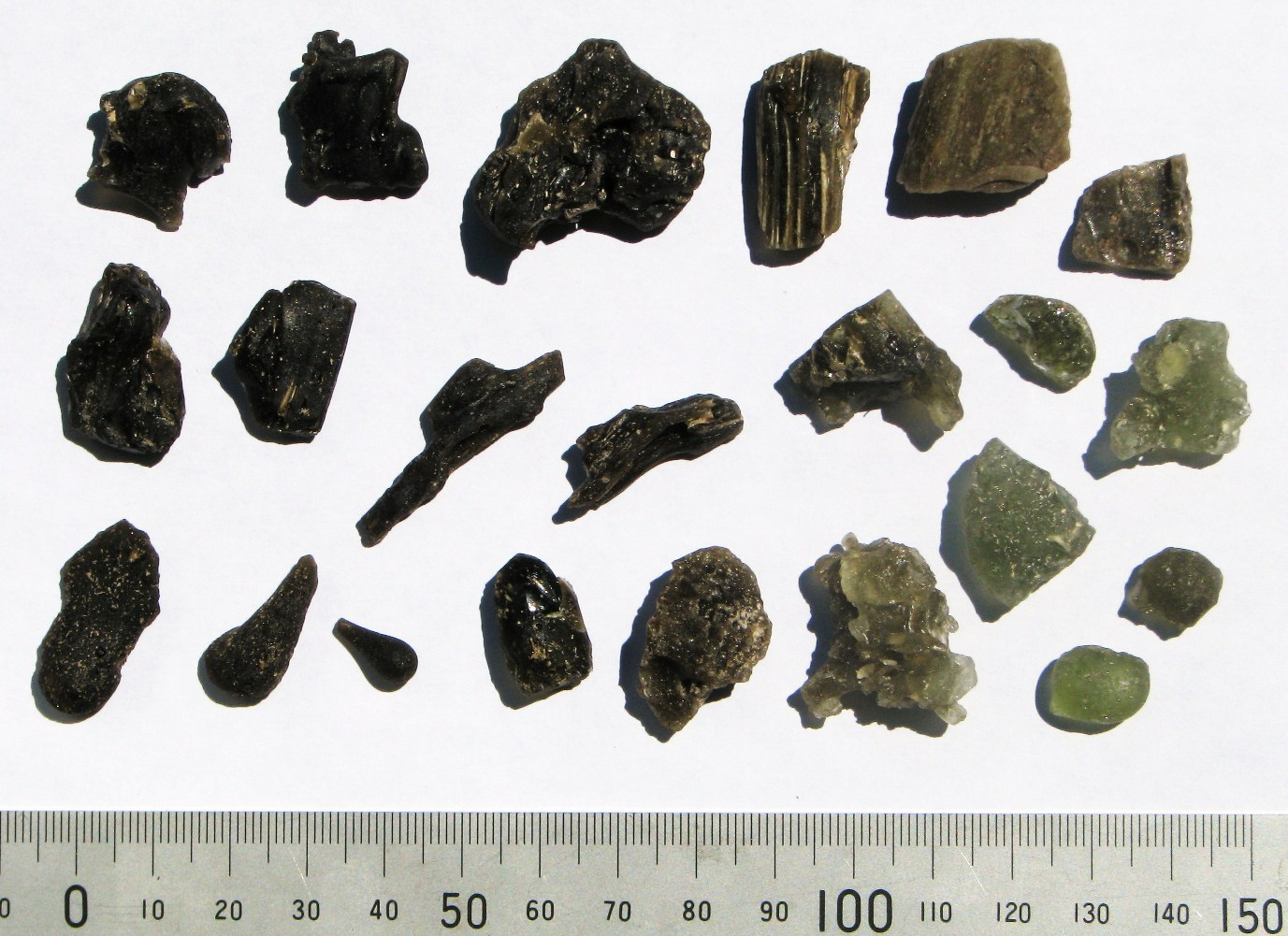
Darwin Glass formed in an impact by a large meteor at Darwin Crater

In the Ice age there were valley glaciers and a 1000 km^{2} ice cap. Glaciation on Mount Field occurred 41-44 ka during MIS 3, and 18 ka during MIS 2 with ice free conditions at 16 ka. The ice cap on the Central Plateau was around 65 km in diameter. Its western limit was the Du Cane Range and Lake St Clair. The central part under the ice cap was eroded. Significant areas of till are found in the central highlands arranged roughly in a circle around the former ice cap. Glaciers flowed out into the Franklin River, the Canning Valley, and north into Forth and Mersey Rivers.

Glaciers were in a number of locations on the west coast – at Mount Murchison, Mount Tyndall and the Eldon Range. Glaciers flowed into the Henty River and King River. Moraines were deposited at Crotty and the Henty Road. Ice pushed out from the King River Glacier into Linda, Comstock and Nelson Valleys. Wood from the Linda moraine had a carbon-14 age of 26480 years. There are also cirques on Frenchmans Cap, the West Coast Range, the Denison Range, and King William Range.

Several caves have developed in dolomite and limestone. Well known are King Solomons Cave and Marakoopa Cave at Mole Creek, and the Newdgate Cave at Hastings.

Periglacial activity broke up rocks with ice wedges and formed block fields and block streams.

Gravels are also left from rivers in Quaternary times. These include the Huon River with gravel at Randals Bay, Judbury and Beaupre Point. The pebbles are mostly quartzite, but include dolerite and agate.

== South Tasman Rise ==
A ridge of continental crust extends south of Tasmania below sea level. It contains quartz syenite from 1,119 ± 9 million years ago, and Cenozoic volcanics.

== Macquarie Island ==
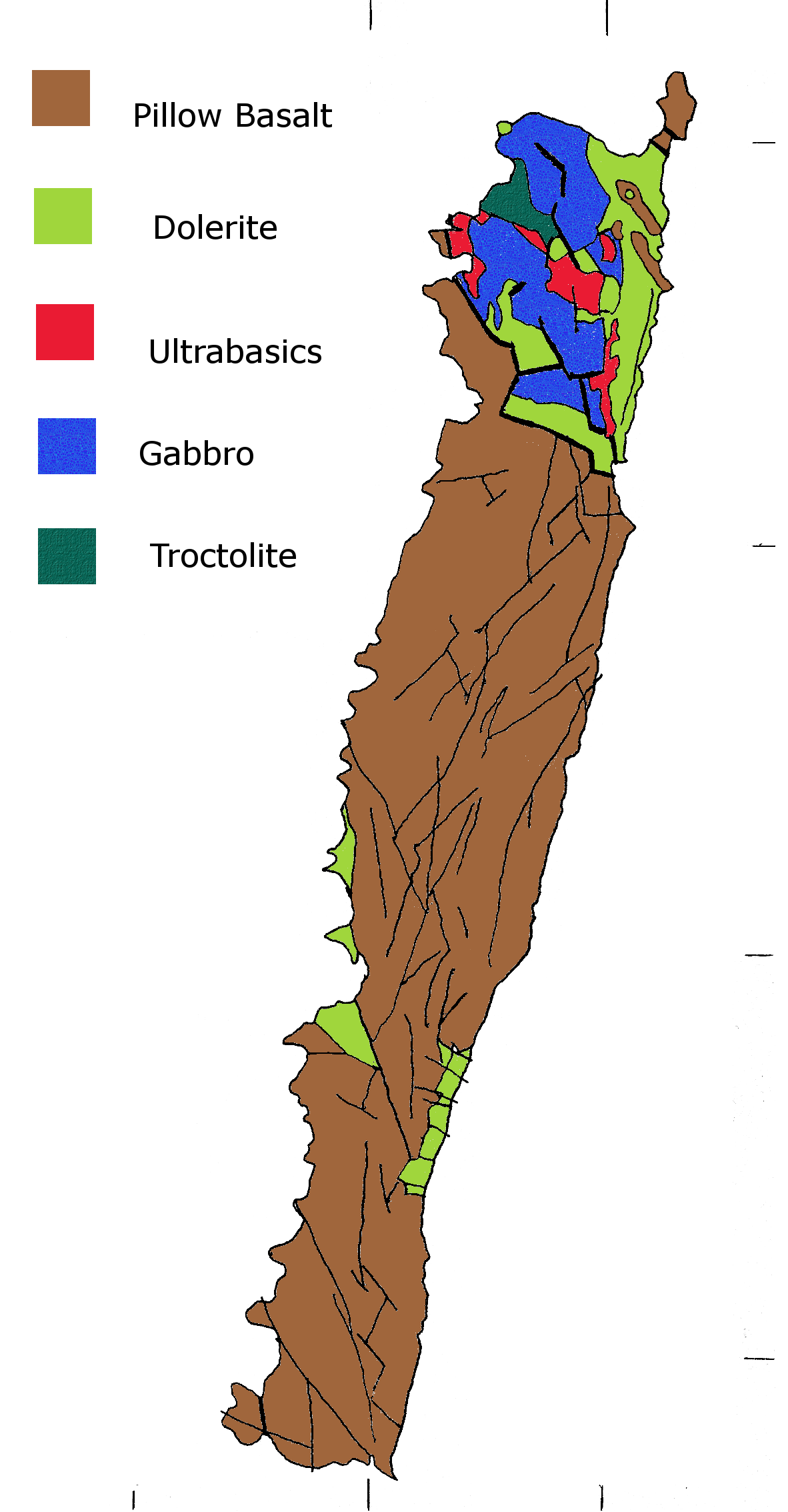
Rock types in Macquarie Island

Macquarie Island is politically part of the state of Tasmania, but comes from a very different geological context. It has formed as part of the oceanic crust and mantle was buckled upwards. It is the only place in the world where a complete section of oceanic crust is exposed above water in the place it was formed. The rock composing the island was formed at the ridge along the boundary of the Australian Plate and the Pacific Plate in Eocene times 12 to 9 million years ago. Spreading from the ridge became less perpendicular (ESE-WNW), more oblique (SE-NW) and eventually almost parallel to the ridge (NNE-SSW). The plate boundary is now entirely a transform fault a few kilometers to the west of the island. This left fracture zones and spreading fabric in the rock. The geomagnetic reversals leave a magnetic anomaly trace in the rock. Transpression on the plate boundary has deformed the oceanic crust in the vicinity to make the Macquarie Ridge Complex, raising Macquarie Island out of the water. It is studied to understand seafloor spreading and transform faults, and hydrothermal alteration of the undersea floor. Most of the south of the island consists of sub oceanic basalt layered between Globigerina ooze. The part north of Langdon Point and Ballast Bay consists of serpentinite derived from gabbro, troctolite, and peridotite (dunite, wehrlite, and harzburgite). This was formed in the deep crust and mantle.

The two different rock zones are separated by the Finch-Langdon fault zone. It consists of seven segments of faults, subsidiary faults and splays. The fault is a transform fault with a corner at the spreading ridge. South of the fault on the west coast is breccia interbedded with the basalts. The breccia matrix is mud, and the stones consist of basalt, dolerite, and gabbro. The southern end of Bauer Bay has a talus of breccia 140 m thick. On top is greywacke and chert. Many other faults cut the rock due to stress from the transform, and uplift. Some of these have scarps that dam lakes.

== Plate tectonics ==
Various theories describe the past history of Tasmania in relation to other continental masses. Most models have the south west Tasmania abutting East Antarctica. In the missing link model, Z. X. Li has south west China positioned off the east coast of Tasmania with rifting at 825 to 780 million years ago, with the Kamding dykes in China matching some granites from Tasmania.

Tasmania can be subdivided into two terranes, separated by the Tamar Fracture System, on a line from the Tamar River to Sorell in the south east. The West Tasmania Terrane constitutes most of the state, including all the Precambrian and Cambrian rocks. The East Tasmania Terrane makes up the north east and east coasts dating from the Ordovician.

In the model of Moore Betts and Hall, Precambrian Tasmania was part of a microcontinent called VanDieland. VanDieland was first proposed by Cayley in 2011. It consists of Western Tasmania, the South Tasman Rise, the East Tasman Plateau and the Selwyn block in the central Lachlan Orogen. In the time of the Rodinia supercontinent, southern VanDieland was next to southwestern Laurentia, part of the Grenville Front. Central VanDieland was next to the Miller Range in the Transantarctic Mountains in East Antarctica. VanDieland separated during the late Neoproterozoic moving north to the Robertson Bay Terrane in North Victoria Land. The different elements making up Precambrian assembled together from microcontinental ribbon terranes (also termed crustal megaboudins). These elements or ribbons collided on the western edge, or on the northeastern edge of the VanDieland microcontinent causing it to grow. In this period, into the Cambrian, a subduction zone absorbed the convergence of the proto-Pacific plate beneath the microcontinent. The Tasmanian terranes only accreted onto Gondwana in the Middle Devonian in the Tabberabberan Orogeny. The westernmost microcontinental ribbon terrane is the King Island element. This not only consists of King Island, but also a strip extending all the way just off shore from the west coast of Tasmania, and north to Phillip Island under Bass Strait.

The Barrow River Fault is a major Paleozoic fault. In the section from the west of King Island it has a north-northwest orientation and had a sinistral displacement of 70 km. Just to the north of the western end of Macquarie Harbour the fault changes direction and heads south. But the southern section only has 5 km of displacement.

The Rocky Cape Block which is mainly in the far northwest Tasmania also includes parts that have been shifted south by the Barrow River Fault. The Sorell Peninsula south of Macquarie Harbour, and the tip of Point Hibbs are also part of this element. The Eastern boundary of the Rocky Cape Block is marked by the Arthur Metamorphic complex in the north, and a fault in the south. These structures dip to the east 30°, and have had sinistral movement at 516 Ma. East of this block is the Burnie Zone. The Pedder Zone lies east, and makes up south and south west Tasmania. The Tyennan Zone is separated from the Pedder Zone by eastward dipping Mt Hobhouse Fault.

== Geohazards ==
The east side of the island of Tasmania is in a low earthquake area. The western highlands is part of a belt of seismic activity that includes highlands in eastern Victoria and New South Wales. Just off the north east coast is a point with a large number of tremors, believed to be an incipient volcano. Macquarie Island is in an earthquake region. On 23 December 2004 an earthquake measuring 8.1 on the Richter magnitude scale (one of the largest earthquakes ever recorded) rocked the island, but caused little damage.

The last major earthquake in Tasmania was between magnitude 6.5 and 7 at the Lake Edgar Fault in the Recent Period, but more than 200 years ago.

On 4 June 1872, a large landslip collapsed part of the side of Mount Arthur. A huge debris flow descended Humphrys Rivulet, stripping the upstream parts of trees and regolith. Where Glenorchy is now, a flood 600 meters wide engulfed farms. Broken trees, boulders, and mud were deposited. Remarkably no one lost their life as all escaped to safety when hearing the rumbling in the distance.

== Minerals ==
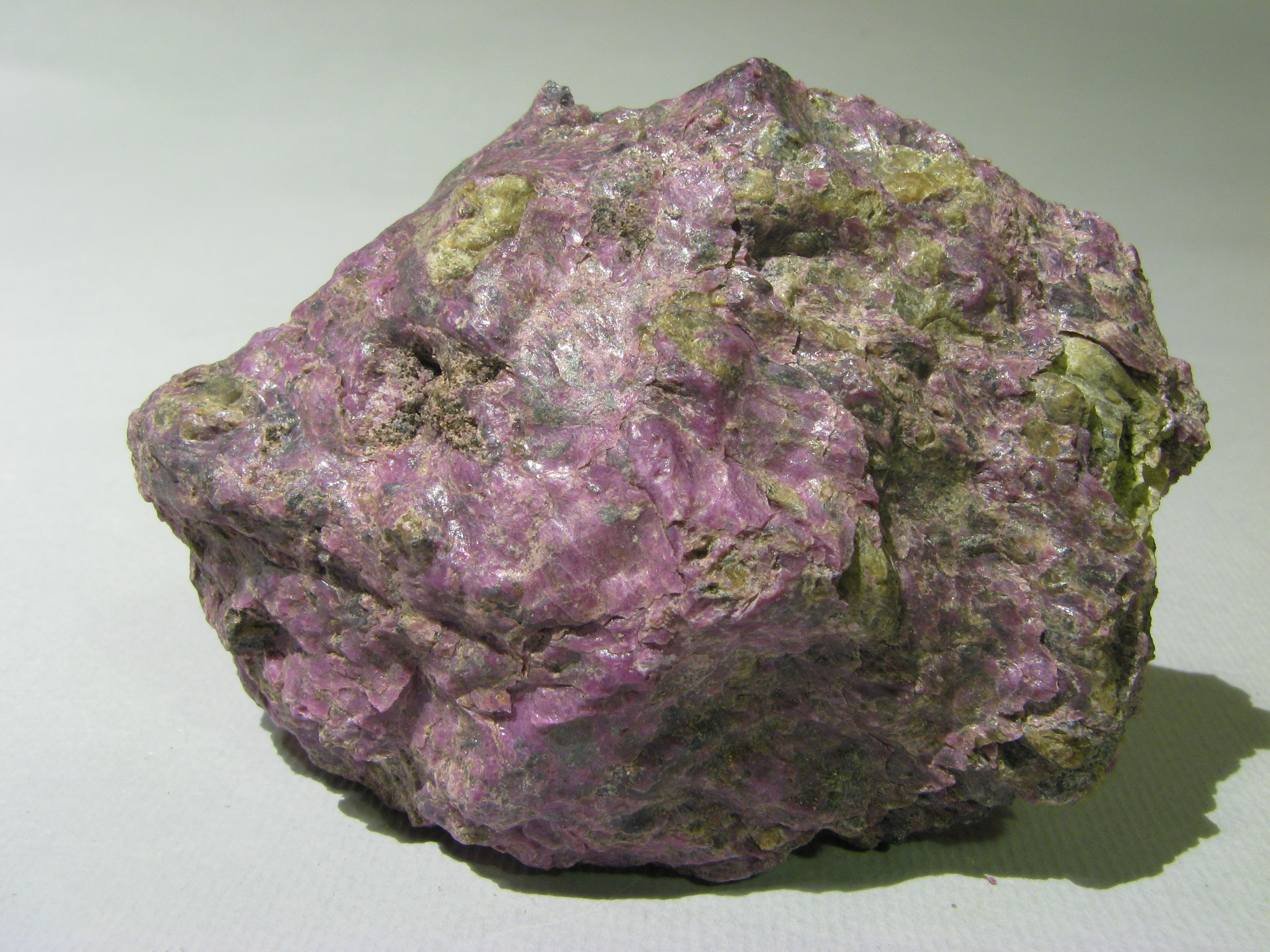
Stichtite from Tasmania

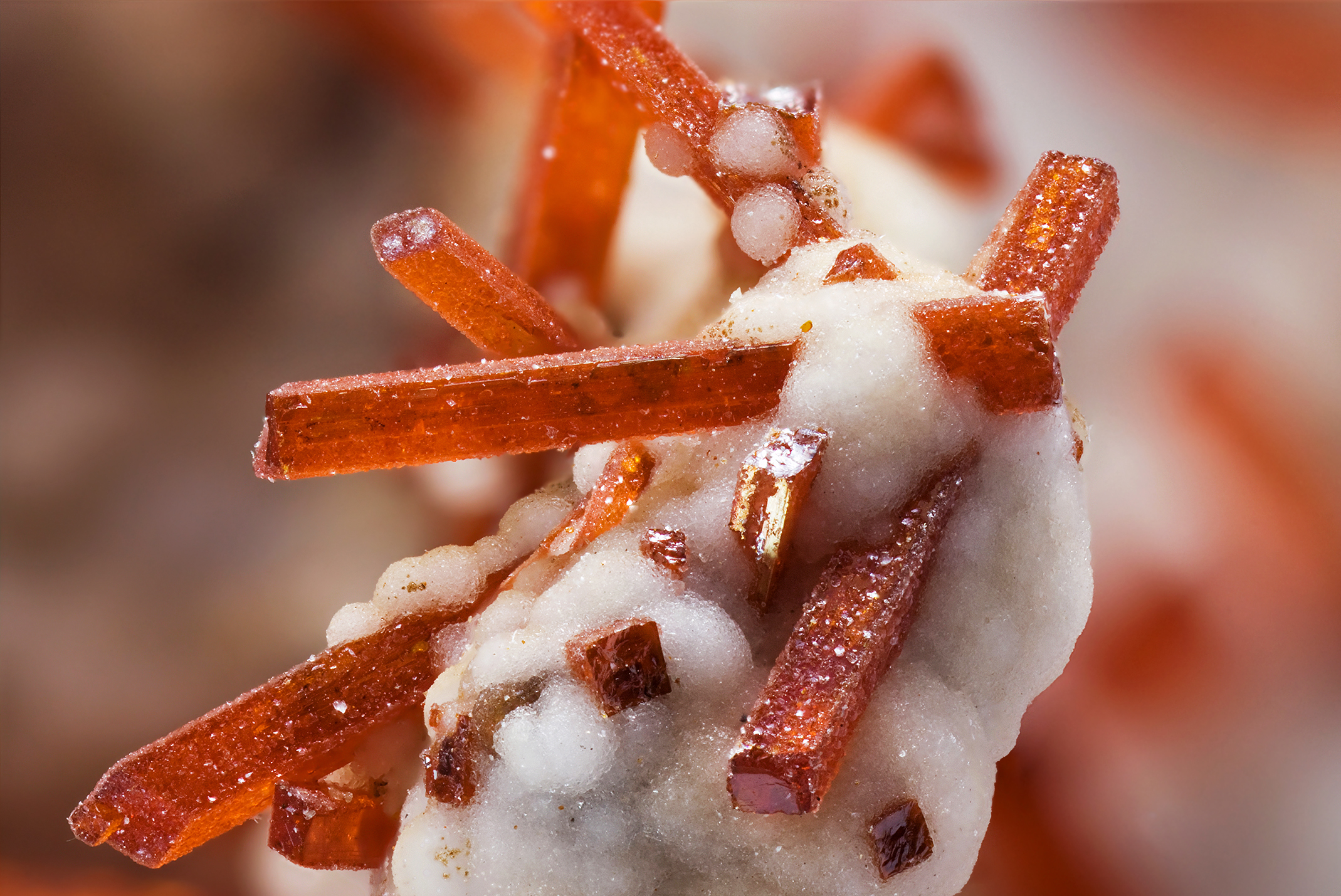
Dundasite is the snow like mineral encasing crocoite

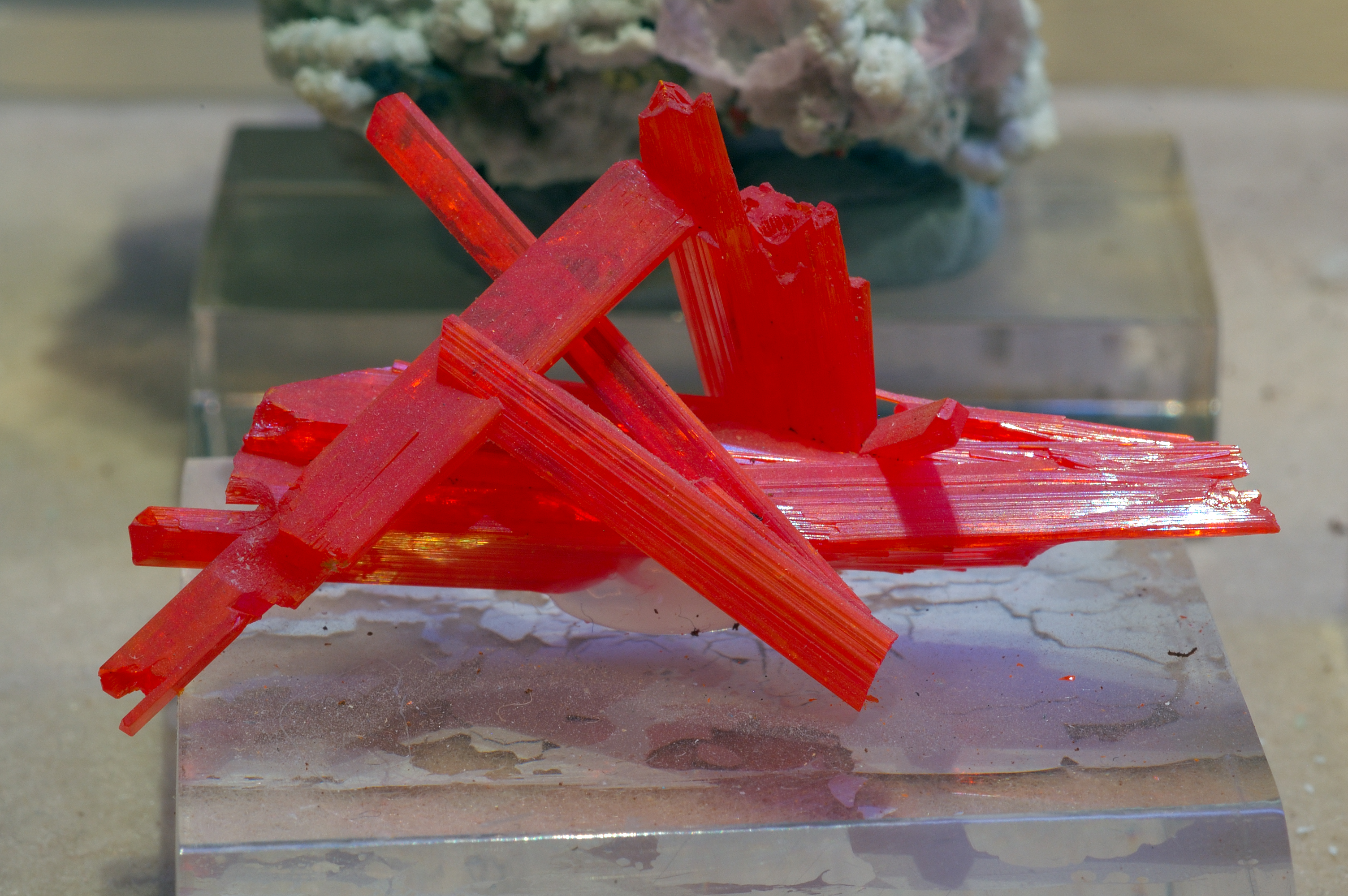
Crocoite specimen from the Red Lead Mine

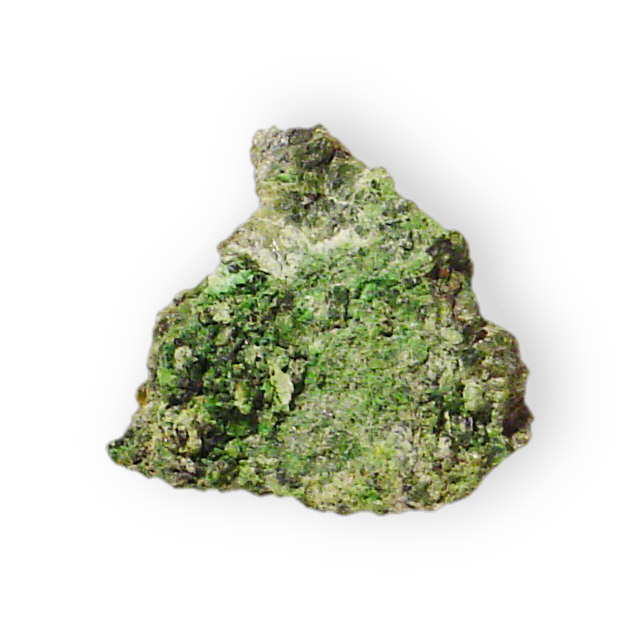
Zaratite from Tasmania

Several unusual minerals are known from Tasmania: crocoite, stichtite, ferroaxinite from Dundas, sellaite, chondrodite, norbergite, wagnerite and fluoborite from Mount Bischoff, heazlewoodite (Originally discovered in Tasmania) and shandite from the Trial Harbour nickel mine. From Mount Lyell there are rare minerals: mawsonite, betechtinite, florenceite, hessite, jalpaite, magnesiofoitite, svanbergite–woodhousite, stannoidite, stromeyerite, and zunyite.

Tasmanite the mineral named after Tasmania is in Dana's classification as an Oxygenated hydrocarbon. It consists of reddish brown scales about 1 mm across. It is insoluble in benzene, carbon disulfide, turpentine, ether or alcohol. It contains about 5% sulfur. It is found on the banks of the Mersey River. The shale it is present in, is a kind of oil shale.

Pelionite is a name for cannel coal from Mount Pelion East and Barn Bluff. This term is no longer used.

William Frederick Petterd was an amateur who studied minerals in Tasmania. He built up the Petterd collection which was donated to the Royal Society of Tasmania and stored at the Tasmanian Museum and Art Gallery. He discovered dundasite, named from the mine where it was found. Dundaisite has formula PbAl_{2}(CO_{3})_{2}(OH)_{4}.H_{2}O. It is a silky milk white spherical aggregate.

Philipsbornite, PbAl_{3}(AsO_{4})_{2}(OH)_{5}.H_{2}O was originally found in the Adelaide mine and identified as a new mineral by Professor Kurt Walenta. It was named after another German professor Helmuth Richard Hermann Adolf Friedrich von Philipsborn. It occurs as several other mines and appears as a greenish grey earth.

Shandite, Ni_{3}Pb_{2}S_{2}, was first discovered at Trial Harbour by P. Ramdohr in 1960.

== Geophysics ==
The geothermal gradient was measured at a gas seep in Smithton as 26.4 degrees/km. The gradient at Forest, Tasmania is 27.8 °C/km. The Otway Basin has a gradient of 36 °C/km. Several companies are exploring for hot rocks for geothermal energy. The granite areas have a gradient of 30°/km, whereas the Parmeener sedimentary areas have a gradient of 40°/km. Heat flow is between 85 and 159 mW/m^{2}.

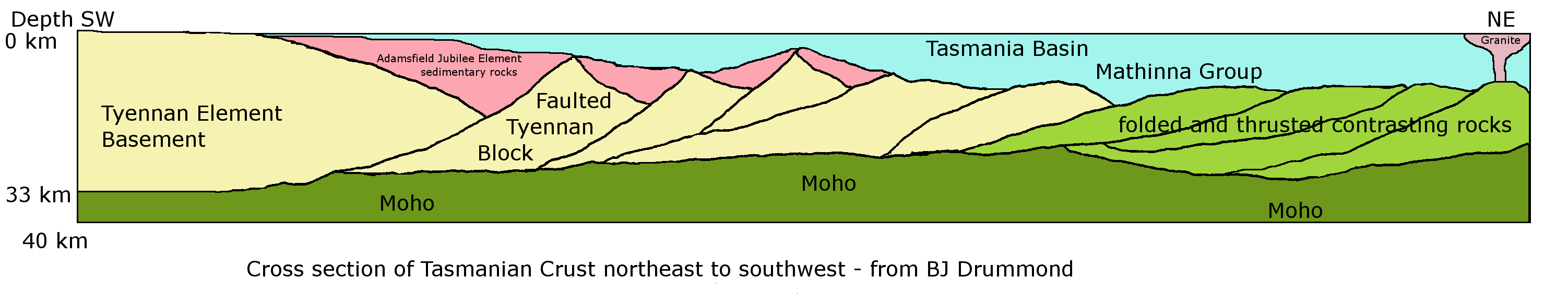
Crustal section though Tasmania southwest to northeast showing buried tilted block faulting

Active seismic exploration reveals the nature of the deep crust. It shows that the Tyennan block plumbs the depth to the moho which is about 33 km underneath. The Tyennan Block slopes below the Adamsfield-Jubilee Element. Under the Tasmania Basin the block is stretched, with faults in to several large blocks that have tilted down. Above these the Adamsfield-Jubilee Element sediments have filled in the topography. Below the north east element the moho is 36 km deep with alternating seismically fast and slow rocks in the mid crust. The Tyennan Block and the Rocky Cape Element have a boundary that dips at 30° to the east to the base of the crust. The Dundas Element lies on top of this boundary. A shallower Moho occurs under the Rocky Cape Block at 26 to 28 km. A deep segment is found under the central north of the state, down to 34 km. Shallower moho depths also occur under southeast and southern Tasmania. A low seismic velocity zone occurs under the Tamar Fracture System. East of this zone is the Northeast Tasmania Block with higher seismic velocities. The high speed zone boundary meets the east coast near Little Swanport, Tasmania but the high speed zone also includes Maria Island and Forestier Peninsula. the Bass Strait is a low seismic velocity zone.

Magnetic field measurements show that the different elements making up Tasmania have very different signatures. Wherever there is Jurassic Dolerite, the magnetic map shows fine ripples, so the Tasmania Basin stands out, as does the smaller intrusions in the other elements. The North east element is smooth, as is the Tyennan Block, and the Adamsfield-Jubilee Element. The Dundas Element has a smooth background with prominent north–south ridges. The Rocky Cape Element is densely packed with linear textures parallel to the Arthur Lineament, with the Smithton Syncline showing as a Y shape. King Island also shows north–south texture. Basalt south of Wynyard also shows a wrinkly magnetic signature.

The stress field in the crust has not yet been measured.

== Mining ==
World class mineral deposits of base and precious metals were found in western Tasmania. Major mines are at Mount Lyell, Rosebery, Zeehan, Que River, Henty and Savage River. Many are hosted in the Mount Read Volcanics. They are in the form of massive sulfides. The Mount Lyell mine extracts copper and gold. The Renison Bell mine was the largest primary tin producer in Australia. Mount Lyell gold and copper deposit was discovered in 1883, formerly the biggest copper mine, and operating till this day.

The Savage River ore body is in the Bowry Formation in the Arthur Metamorphic Complex. It consists of magnetite, pyrite, chalcopyrite and tiny amounts of sphalerite, ilmenite and rutile. The ore was formed under the sea in association with volcanism. The Savage River area also contains deposits of magnesite in the form of marble.

At Beaconsfield, 1.95 million ounces of gold was mined from a quartz reef in a fault. The largest Tasmanian gold nugget was found at Rocky River in 1883, weighing 243 ounces.

An oil exploration boom happened in the 1920s with two companies making bold claims, but earning nothing from oil shale.

Asbestos was mined from the Cape Sorell and Serpentine Hill ultramafic complexes.

== History ==
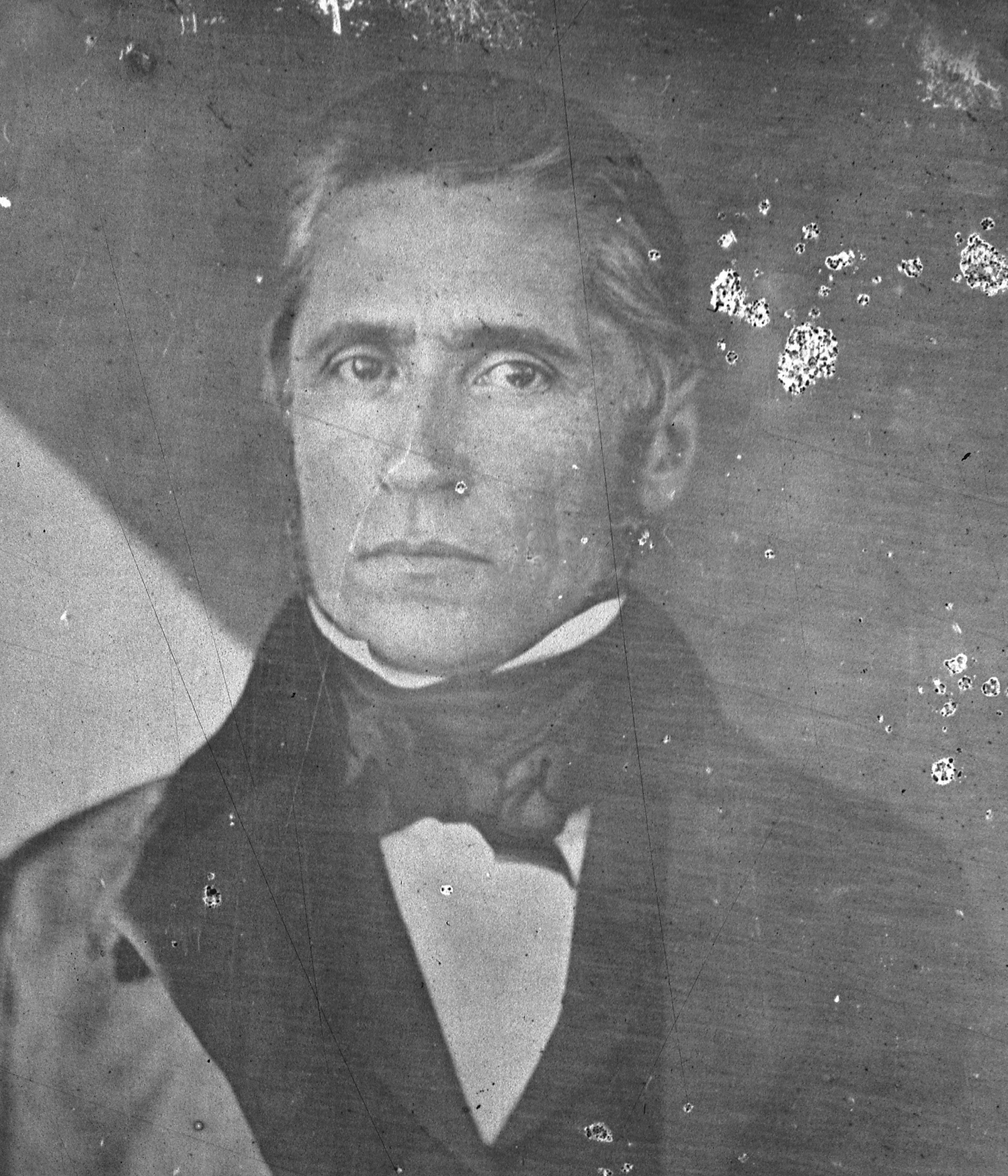
Paweł Strzelecki who explored Tasmania and studied its geology in the 1840s.

Abel Janszoon Tasman noted in his journal on 22 November 1642 that his compasses were not steady and deduced the presence of deposits of lodestone. This was two days before his lookout spotted Tasmania for the first time. This was the first prognostication of mineral wealth on the west coast of Tasmania.

A. W. Humphrey, a mineralogist, collected rocks and minerals from 1804. W. H. Twelvetrees and W. F. Petterd did petrographic investigations in Cygnet, around 1899. Other unpaid people studied Tasmanian geology such as Paweł Edmund Strzelecki, Joseph Milligan who was a surgeon, R.M. Johnson, Charles Darwin, John Lhotsky and Joseph Jukes.

Joseph Milligan sent specimens of a manganese mineral from Frenchman's Cap and Galena to the 1851 Great Exhibition in London. Small amounts of gold were discovered at Fingal and Lefroy in 1851. William B. Clarke, a geologist and Anglican parson, predicted that gold would be found in Tasmania at 146 degrees east longitude line. On 17 July 1859 Charles Gould, a geologist recruited from England, was appointed as the Geological Surveyor of Tasmania by the Tasmanian governor. He began the search for worthwhile minerals in the west, gave up and studied the geology of the eastern half of the state instead. He was commissioned by the Tasmanian Government in 1862 to return to the west coast, he named mountains in the West Coast Range: Mount Lyell after Charles Lyell, Mount Darwin, Mount Huxley and opponents of Charles Darwin were commemorated with Mount Owen, Mount Sedgwick, and Mount Jukes. Gould returned several times but did not find worthwhile mineral deposits. James "Philosopher" Smith discovered the Mount Bischoff tin deposit, for many years the world's richest and largest, on 4 December 1871. This discovery inspired George Renison Bell to find more tin and other minerals in western Tasmania. Dally shortly thereafter found important gold reefs at Beaconsfield and at Lefroy in the northeast.

In 1882, Gustav Thureau was appointed Inspector of Mines, later called Inspector and Mining Geologist. In 1889, the position became Geological Surveyor. William Harper Twelvetrees took up the position. He established the Geological Survey library, and mineral and rock collection at the Queen Victoria Museum in Launceston. In 1883, the Mines Office was created from the Commissioners and registrars for mines and goldfields that worked in the Mines Branch of the Lands and Works Department. Bernard Shaw was appointed the Secretary for Mines. The Mines Office gained a Minister for Mines in 1894 and changed its name to Mines Department. Bernard Shaw later became the Police Commissioner. The Mines Department lost its separate existence in July 1989 when it was merged to the Department of Resources and Energy, which has since changed its name several times. The current name for the Mines Office is Mineral Resources Tasmania.

Tannatt William Edgeworth David, a geologist working out of Sydney, was a proponent of the idea of Permo-Carboniferous glaciations. He studied the evidence for past glaciations in Tasmania.

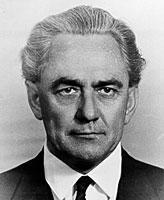
Professor Samuel Warren Carey

Professor S. Warren Carey established the Department of Geology at the University of Tasmania on 27 October 1946. He was an early proponent of continental drift and the unorthodox expanding earth theory. He had become the Government Geologist of Tasmania in 1944 where he organised the understanding of Paleozoic formations in the west coast mineral fields, and introduced the Cenozoic rift valley idea, and the policy of publishing the results of the Geologic Survey. Carey introduced terms such as orocline and sphenochasm and the concept of the hotspot. The University of Tasmania building for Geology and Geography was constructed in 1962. It had exhibitions of a Foucault pendulum, a seismometer recording drum, a mosaic illustrating crystal symmetry, and a large terrestrial globe. Carey organised and hosted the Continental Drift Symposium in 1956.

The Tasmanian Seismic Net was established in 1957.

Professor Carey founded the Tasmanian Caverneering Club.

The film Walking with Dinosaurs was filmed in part in central Tasmania where forests of gymnosperms similar to vegetation in the Cretaceous still grow.
