= Magnet Tramway =

2ft gauge tramway in Tasmania

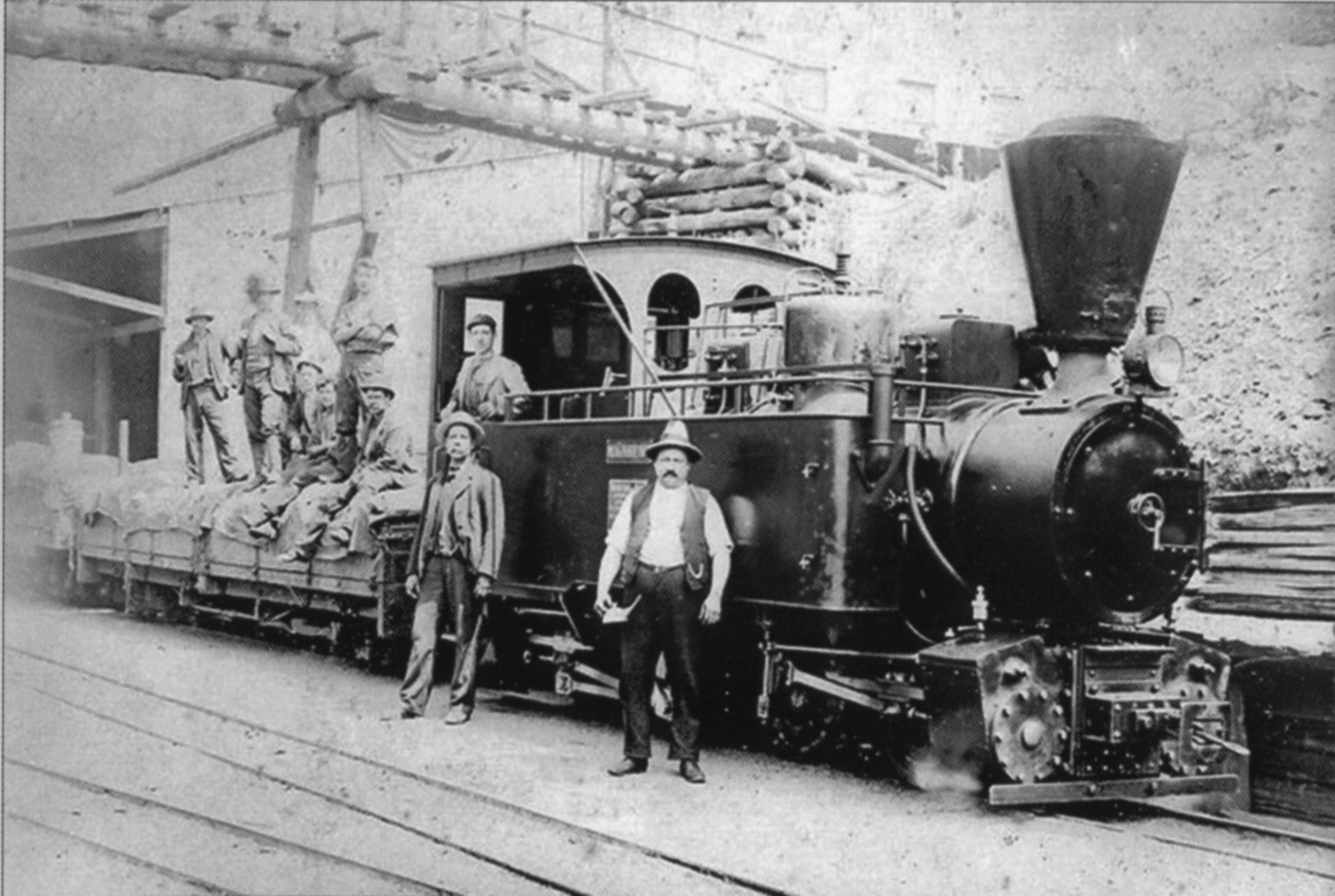
Orenstein & Koppel Mallet

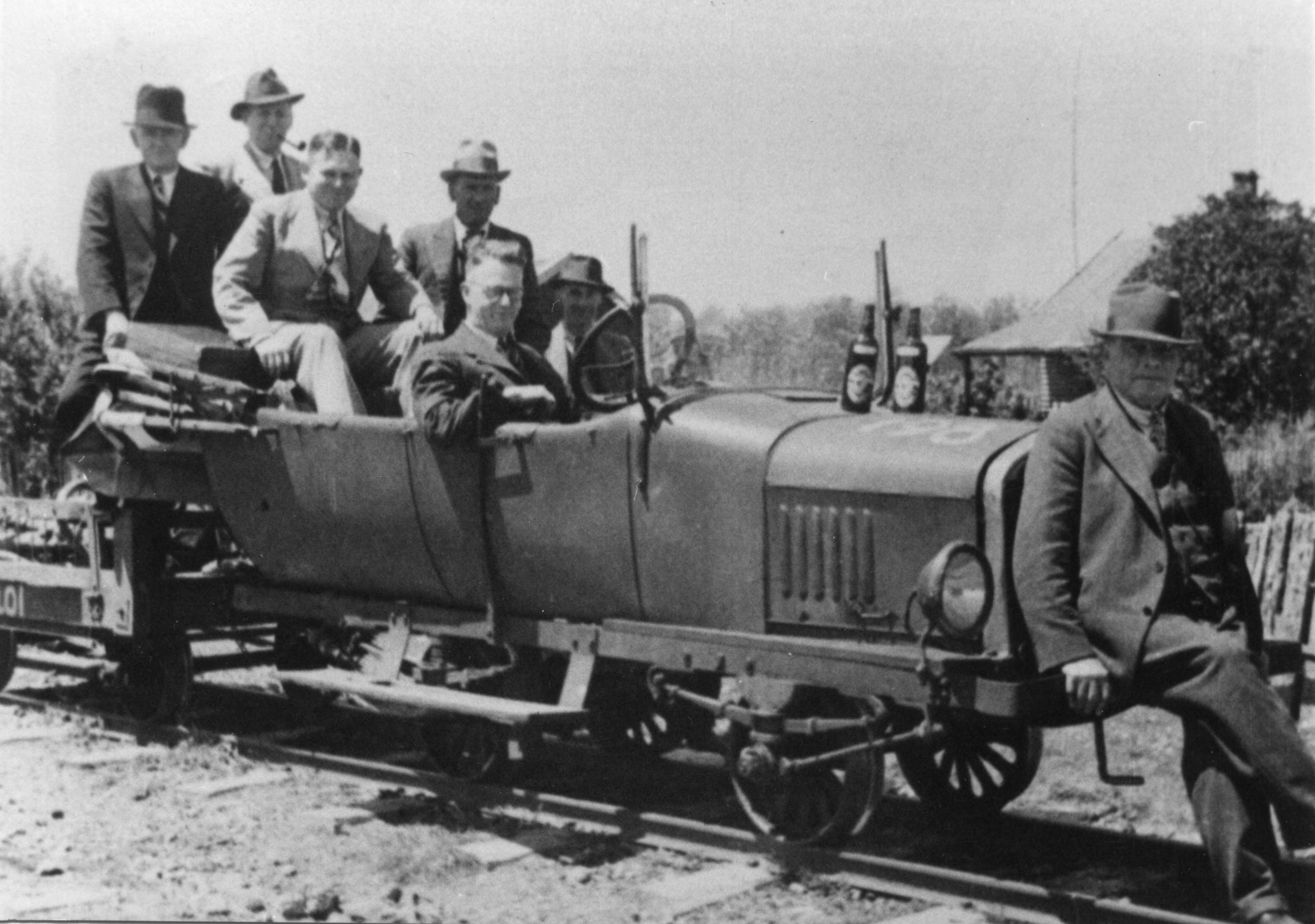
Ford Model T railmotor

The Magnet Tramway, often found referred to as the Magnet Tram, was a 2 ft (610 mm) gauge railway in north west Tasmania. It ran between Magnet Junction on the Guildford to Mount Bischoff railway line, and the Magnet mine.

== History ==
The track was being constructed in 1901. The construction was led by B.F. Waller, who started to work as managing director and responsible engineer in January 1901. Previously, the route had been roughly surveyed by the former mine manager T.H. Jones. Although the destination was only 6.5 km (4.0 mi) from the interchange in Waratah, the route had a total of 194 bends and a length of 16 km (9.9 mi) due to the difference in altitude of 183 m (600 ft). The climb for the first 13 km (8.1 mi) was 1.9‰ (100 feet per mile) and then it was then less steep. The light rail profiles weighing 15 kg/m (30 lb/yd) were laid on 22,000 sleepers, most of which were made of Huon pine.

The tramway included the following rolling stock:

- Orenstein & Koppel 0-4-4-0T Mallet locomotives No 1 and 3
- Orenstein and Koppel 0-4-0T locomotive No 2
- Ford Model T railmotor

In 1941 Mount Magnet silver mine closed, the railway and locomotive were bought by sawmiller R.J. Howard of Zeehan.
