= Mount Magnet silver mine =

Mount Magnet silver mine, also known as the Magnet Silver Mining Company operated between 1902 and 1941.

The former locality and mine site that supported the mine in the years of its operation lies about 20 km out of Waratah.

In the 1890s the operation was mined by the Mount Magnet Silver-Lead Mine name, and this continued after the 1902 company started.

The discovery of the deposit was in 1881, but the ground was not worked until 1890. The 10 mile long Magnet Tramway commenced in 1902.

It was walking distance from Waratah.

The mine was ranked third after Bischoff and Mount Lyell in the 1920s in its success and production.

The mine company went into liquidation in 1932, but operated until 1941.
