= James Smith (miner) =

Australian politician

Smith in old age

James (Philosopher) Smith (1 July 1827 – 15 June 1897) was a politician, goldminer, explorer and discoverer of tin reserves in Tasmania, Australia including the Mount Bischoff mine.

Smith was born at Georgetown, Van Diemen's Land (now Tasmania), second of three children of John Smith and his wife Ann, née Grant. When James Smith was five years old, his father was shot dead and his mother later remarried.
