= Mount Bischoff =

Mountain and former mine in Tasmania

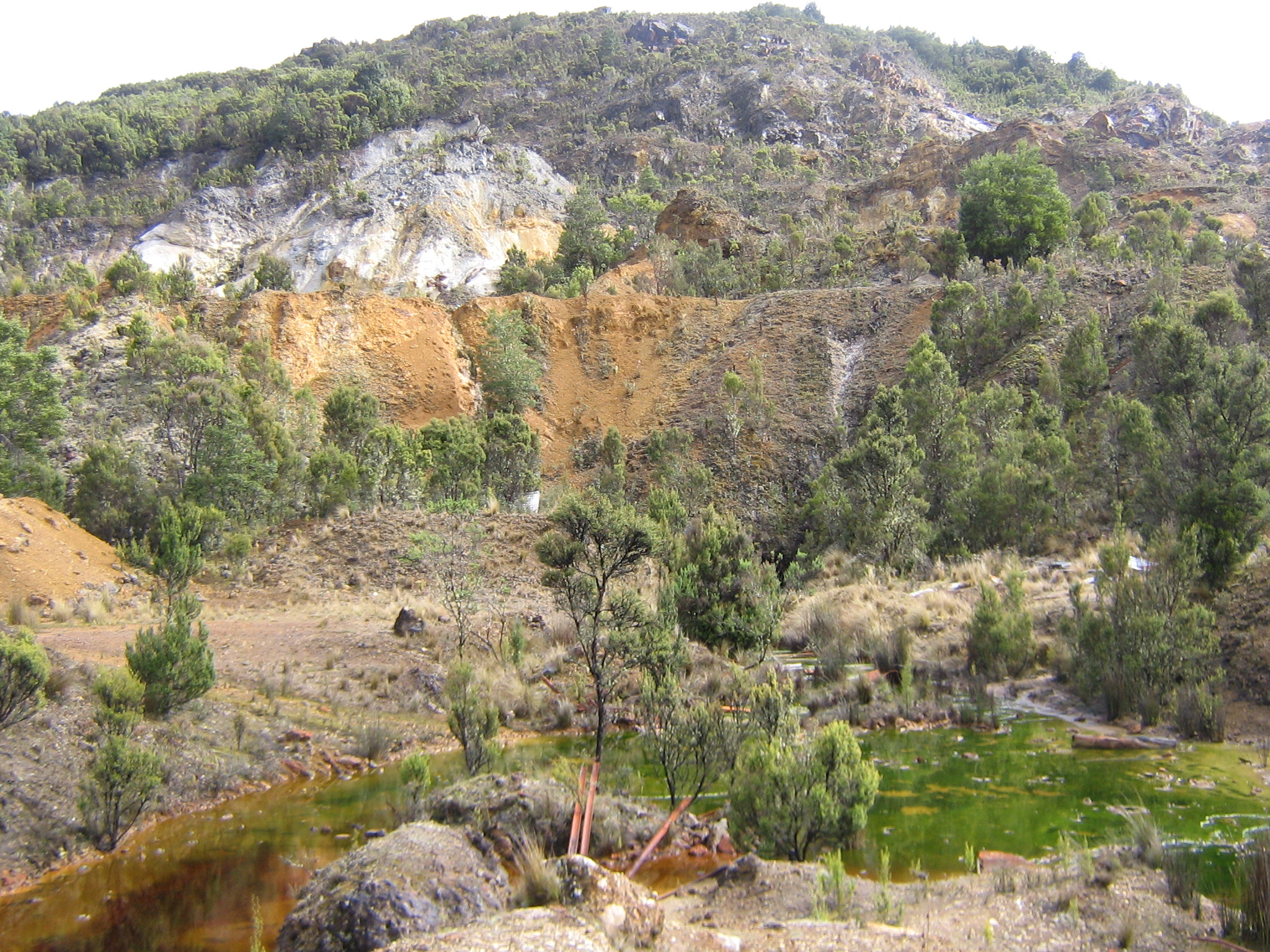
- Former open cut mine at Mount Bischoff (2006)

- Location in Tasmania
- Location: North West region, Tasmania, Australia; 41°25′12″S 145°31′12″E
- Products: Tin
- Active: 1870s–1929; 1942–1947; 2008–present
- Company: Privately owned (1871–1929); Government of Australia (1942–1947); Metals X (2008– )
- Website: metalsx.com.au

Mount Bischoff is a mountain and former tin mine in the north-western region of Tasmania, Australia. The mountain is situated adjacent to Savage River National Park, near the town of Waratah.

== Location and features ==
The mountain was named in the early nineteenth century after the chairman of the Van Diemen's Land Company, James Bischoff. Tin was discovered there in 1871 by James "Philosopher" Smith.

== Tin mine ==
The first operator of the mine was the Mount Bischoff Tin Mining Company, which used a sluice supplied with water from the top of the waterfall in Waratah. In June 1883, the mine installed one of the first hydro-electric generators in Australia, using it to light the offices, workshop and manager's house.

The easy ore had all been extracted by 1893, when sluicing was discontinued. Mining continued as an open-cut on the face of the mountain, as well as underground. The manager of the mine from 1907 to 1919 was John Dunlop Millen, who was "credited with the modernisation of the mine’s facilities and was regarded by all those associated with the mine’s operations as an effective manager". The underground mine closed in 1914, although surface mining continued for some time, ceasing after the price of tin slumped in 1929. In 1942, the mine was reopened by the Commonwealth Government to support the war effort, but it closed again in 1947.

Between 1900 and mid-1940, the mine was connected to the Emu Bay Railway by the Waratah Branch of that railway, which ran from Guildford Junction to Waratah.

== 2000s revival ==
In 2008, after several earlier minor attempts, Metals X Limited, a Perth-based tin mining company, through its subsidiary Bluestone Mines Tasmania Pty Ltd, the operator of the Renison Bell tin mine, decided to mine the remaining ore at Mount Bischoff, to blend with ore from its Renison Bell operation. A large open cut operation, taking in all the old historic workings, was developed, with the ore being trucked 80 kilometres (50 mi) to the Renison Bell processing plant. At the time, ore reserves at Mount Bischoff were estimated to be 845,000 tonnes (832,000 long tons) grading at 1.20 percent tin. In 2009/10 198,000 tonnes (195,000 long tons) of ore was mined at the Mount Bischoff open-cut, which produced 6,267 tonnes (6,168 long tons) of tin in concentrate.

By 2015, the mine at Mount Bischoff was on care and maintenance, but Bluestone Mines Tasmania Pty Ltd was continuing its exploration program.

== See also ==
- List of mountains in Australia § Tasmania
