= Victorian Railways narrow gauge passenger carriages and guards vans =

- Manufacturers: Victorian Railways at Newport Workshops, and Puffing Billy Railway at Emerald Carriage Workshops
- Operators: Victorian Railways, later Puffing Billy Railway

Specifications
- Car body construction: Timber
- Braking system: Westinghouse Air Brake
- Coupling system: Chopper, later 3/4-scale M.C.B. autocouplers
- Track gauge: 2 ft 6 in (762 mm)

All passenger carriages operating under the Victorian Railways were painted a deep red, with black underframes and white lettering. In the early preservation era, vehicles managed by the Puffing Billy Preservation Society had a yellow band painted across the side, indicating the change in responsibility, although this practice slowly fell out of favour in the Emerald Tourist Railway Board era with few (if any) carriages now carrying this indication.

== Victorian Railways stock ==
=== Saloon-style carriages ===
Victorian Railways narrow gauge passenger carriages and guards vans

Specifications
- Car length: 20 ft 6 in (6.25 m) over body; 27 ft 3 3/4 in (8.32 m) over couplers
- Width: 6 ft 3 in (1.91 m) plus exit stairs (^{N}B^{B})
- Wheelbase: 17 ft 0 in (5.18 m) between bogie centres; 3 ft 3 in (0.99 m) between axles in each bogie.

When the Wangaratta to Whitfield line opened in March 1889, it was provided with two American-style second-class bogie saloon vehicles coded B^{B}, and two bogie composite passenger car/brakevans coded BD^{BD}. This could have led to confusion in official correspondence, so the codes painted on the carriages were amended with an N prefix in front of the carriage numbers before they entered service, i.e. N2BD^{BD}.

The new carriages were built on a trussed steel underframe, on a pair of Fox bogies of 3 feet 3 inches (0.99 m) wheelbases at 17 feet (5.2 m) centres and with 21 inches (530 mm) wheels; the same arrangement as the narrow gauge goods fleet. The bodies were of teak, kauri and white pine timber with a clerestory roof over the carbodies.

The carriages were designed to operate in pairs, each of which had a net capacity of 31 passengers. The arrangement was originally two seats for ladies at one end of the passenger car, opposite their lavatory; a 22-seat saloon area for non-smoking passengers making up the remainder of that carriage, and smoking passengers were accommodated in the seven seats provided in the second carriage opposite the men's lavatory.

An additional vehicle of each type was constructed in 1900 for the line to Gembrook, followed by two more of each in 1901. 4^{N}BD^{BD} and 4^{N}B^{B} functioned as spare vehicles, replacing those which had been transported to Newport Workshops for maintenance, while 5^{N}B^{B} and 5NBD^{BD} were held in storage until the Beech Forest line opened in 1902. 1904 saw the sixth ^{N}B^{B} enter service at Wangaratta, and in 1905, the sixth ^{N}BD^{BD} was delivered to Moe for the then-under-construction line to Walhalla.

The pattern vehicles were built at Newport Workshops by Victorian Railways staff. Of the thirteen total carriages, four, nos 2 and 3 of each class, were built by external contractors using space in Newport Workshops under the Butty Gang system. All other vehicles were then constructed at Newport Workshops directly by the railways.

In 1910 the codes were changed from ^{N}BD^{BD} to NBC and ^{N}B^{B} to NB respectively. Around the same time, a seventh NBC carriage was constructed, entering service near the end of 1910 on the newly-opened Walhalla line, though by this time the saloon seating arrangement for wholly passenger cars had been superseded by the below compartment style.

Automatic couplers were fitted in lieu of the original Chopper style progressively between 1926 and 1928.

All external doors were originally glazed with a single drop-window in the top half and protected with five steel bars, but this was later changed to a much smaller window.

==== ^{N}B^{B}, later NB (saloon type) ====
NB Saloon carriages
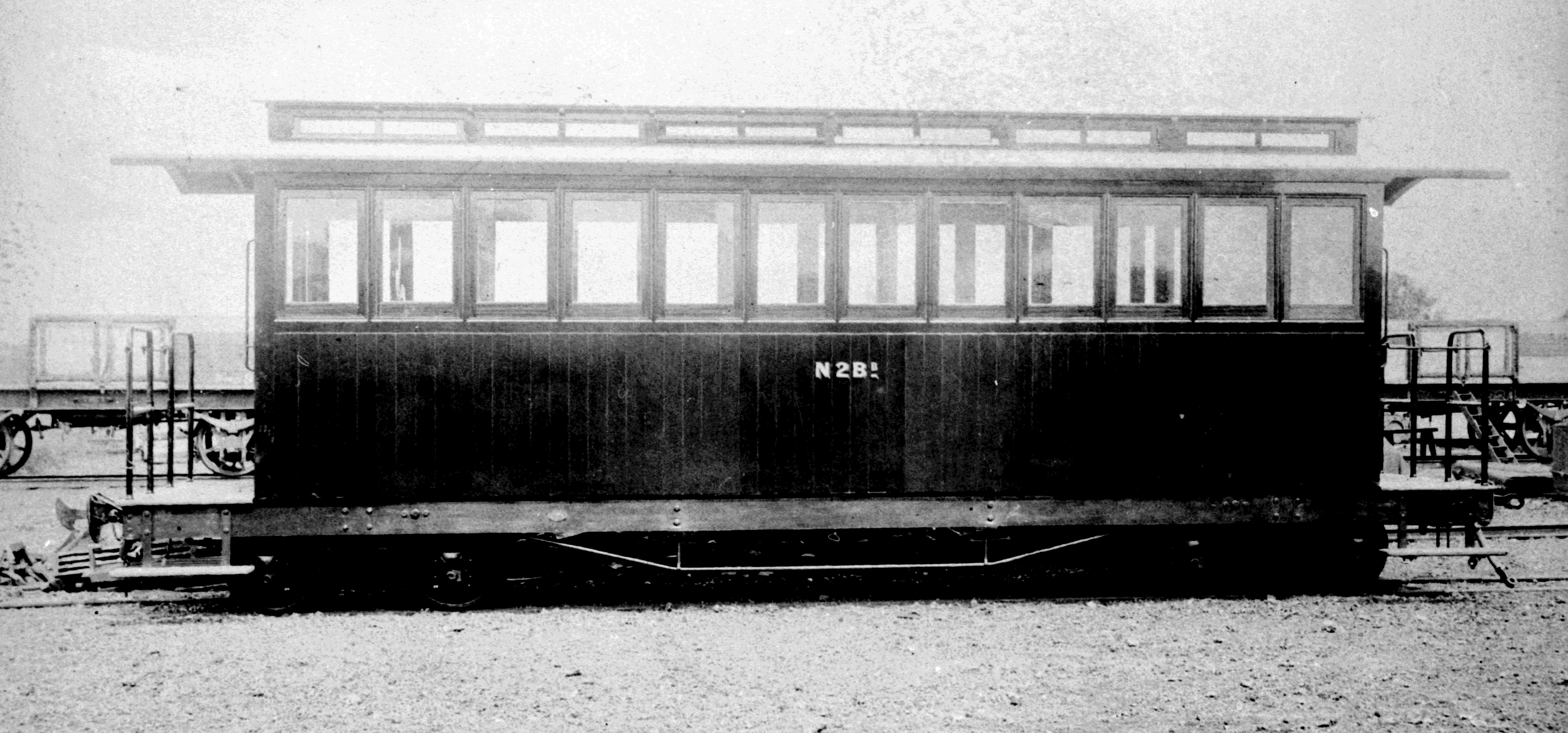
- Design code: ^{N}B^{B}, later NB
- Fleet numbers: 1–6
- Capacity: 24 passengers

The passenger cars had capacity for 24 passengers. Originally a single internal bulkhead with doorway was provided two windows away from one end of the carriage, to create a 3 feet 2 inches (0.97 m) Ladies compartment with a two-seat bench on one side and a lavatory compartment on the other. The remaining ten windows' length of the carriage had an 11-seat bench along either side facing the central aisle. The 16 feet 3 inches (4.95 m) compartment was later divided with a second internal bulkhead (four windows from the non-Ladies end) to make a central non-smoking compartment of 8 feet 11 inches (2.72 m), and a smoking compartment of 6 feet 4 inches (1.93 m), the latter provided with two brass spittoons set into the floor. These compartments had room for 14 and 8 passengers respectively. The end platforms, under a roof extension but without the clerestory, featured steps, moveable barriers, and a drop plate that would allow passengers to walk between cars.

The original design was for only the doors on the ends of each carriage to include a glass pane, but in practice two windows were provided at the smoking end and one at the Ladies end. The cars were originally provided with three kerosene lamps, and all but 5NB were later upgraded to Pintsch gas lighting with underfloor tanks and pipes via the carbody ends up to the roof. Around 1922, in response to complaints, the smoking compartment was converted to a longer Ladies compartment (with the inscription "LADIES" sandblasted into the glass) and smoking accommodation was removed.

To avoid the need to reverse the two carriages at each end of every run, the ^{N}B^{B} cars were permitted to trail behind the ^{N}BD^{BD} vans on each train with the guard working from the van area, but walking to the rear of the ^{N}B^{B} when required.

By 1914, both 3NB and 5NB were fitted with a vertical hand brake on one of the end platforms. This allowed their use as a trailing vehicle on a train if no guards van was available.

5NB was a permanent fixture of the Walhalla line fleet from 1920 through to its withdrawal from service on 2 October 1950.

3NB was erroneously recorded as scrapped in 1928, but later recorded in the workshops in 1931, and was stored at Wangaratta following cessation of passenger services on the line from there to Whitfield, though it did see occasional use after that time. It was recommended for scrapping in December 1937, and this took place in March the following year, along with 4NB. 6NB was sold privately along with compartment car 8NB, and these were recovered by the Puffing Billy Preservation Society from Ocean Grove in the 2000s. 1, 2 and 5NB were retained in service until 1950, when the bodies were transferred to Pakenham for use as staff accommodation during the Gippsland line electrification project. They were officially recorded as scrapped at Newport Workshops in February 1951, but in 1959 all three bodies were purchased by the Puffing Billy Preservation Society and transported by road from Pakenham to Menzies Creek.

Puffing Billy Railway currently has 1NB, 2NBD (formerly 2NB but with guard's compartment fitted) and 5NBD (formerly 5NB but as guard's van and catering car) available for service, along with 6NB awaiting restoration.

==== ^{N}BD^{BD}, later NBC ====
NBC composite compartment carriage and van
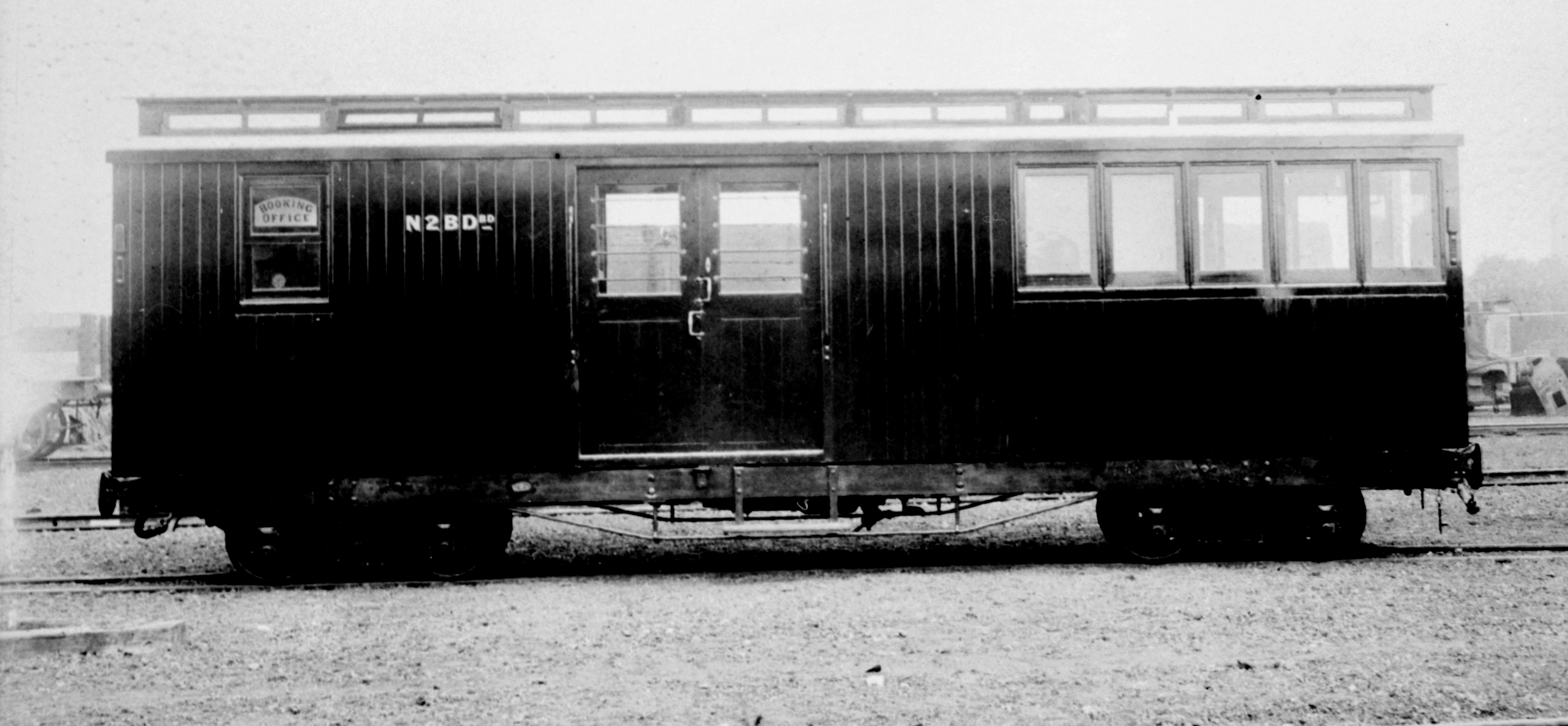
- Design code: ^{N}BD^{BD}, later NBC
- Fleet numbers: 1–7
- Capacity: 7 passengers & 4 tons (NBC)

The composite carriage had a single saloon area fully enclosed and fitted with seating for seven passengers. The composite van's passenger area was unofficially reserved for gentlemen, with smoking permitted (two spittoons were mounted in the floor) and access to the male lavatory area between the passenger and guard areas. The passenger area had four windows on one side and three on the other, the latter adjacent to a pair of frosted windows for the lavatory compartment. Though the original design only specified the passenger compartment end with the door including a window, additional windows were provided either side of that. Three kerosene lamps were provided in the van and one in the saloon.

The guard's compartment of the vans was provided with four parcel shelves, two desks, a seat for the guard and an internal handbrake.

Passengers could only access the gentlemen's saloon through the guard compartment, or via the end-of-carriage doorways included at both ends of the ^{N}B^{BD} vans which were designed to link to the saloon car's end platforms when coupled. Passengers were also permitted to walk through the train via the guards compartment if under supervision; for this purpose a step the width of one door was provided either side of the sliding van doors, though this was subsequently extended to the full width of both doors for safety, and at least two of the seven cars had full-length steps added.

The ^{N}BD^{BD} van area was designed with a workspace, capacity for up to four tons of goods or luggage, and a booking office compartment obviating the need for on-platform ticket sales staff.

4 and 5NBC were scrapped in 1938, 3 and 6 in 1951 and 7 in 1954. 1NBC had been sold in 1954 and transferred to a private property in Colac, from which it was recovered in 1995. 2NBC had been condemned in 1954 but, like much of the Puffing Billy rolling stock, it was restored for use on that line. The Puffing Billy Railway today has 2NBC in service, along with 1NBC and 6NBC stored awaiting restoration.

=== Compartment-style carriages ===
Compartment carriages
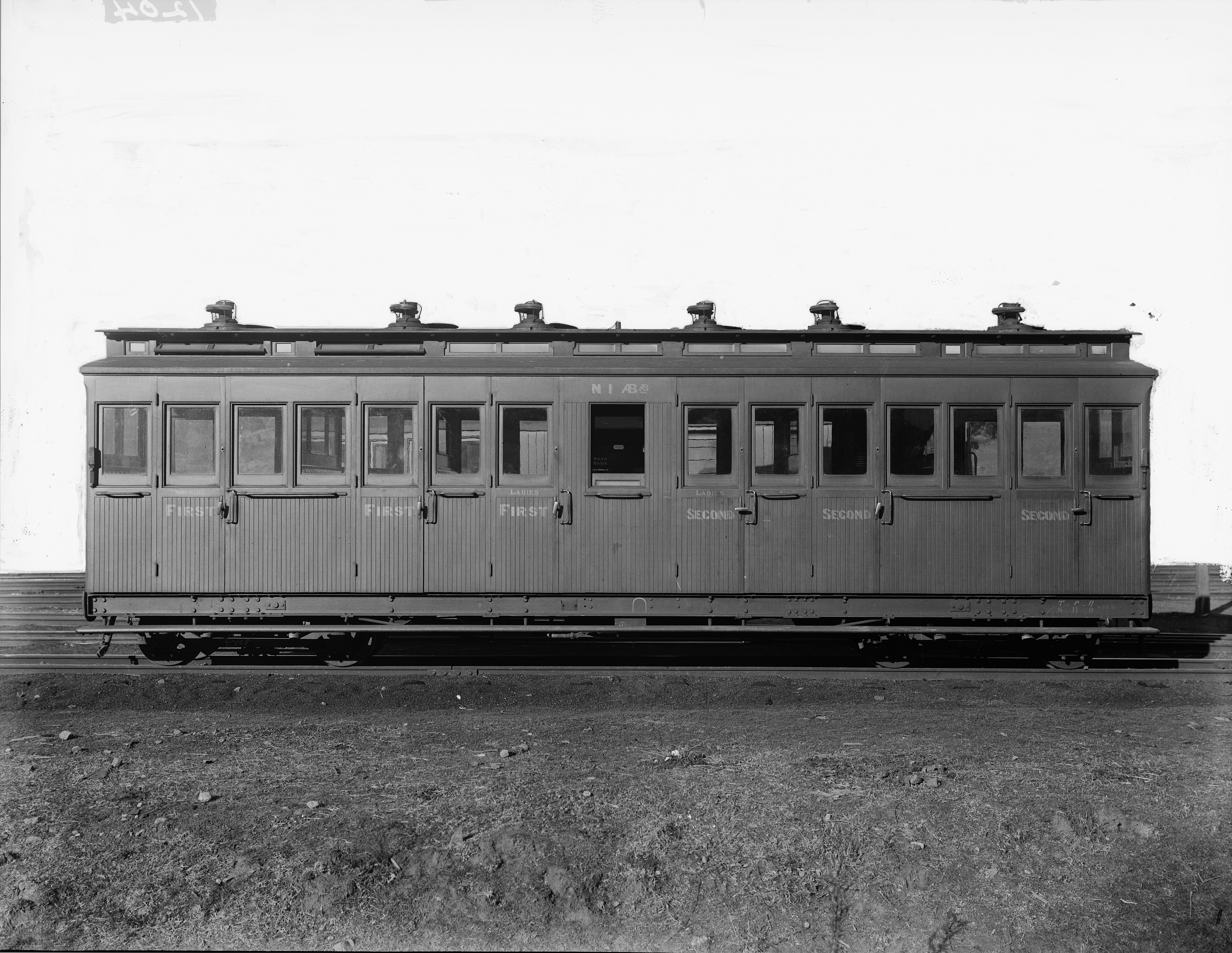
- Narrow gauge carriage N1ABAB
- Design code: ^{N}AB^{AB}, later ^{N}AB
- Fleet numbers: 1–4NAB, 23-27NB, 26NAC
- Capacity: 32 passengers

Specifications
- Car length: 29 ft 6 in (8.99 m) over body; 31 ft 8 in (9.65 m) over couplers
- Width: 6 ft 7 in (2.01 m)
- Height: 9 ft 9 in (2.97 m)
- Wheelbase: 21 ft (6.40 m) between bogie centres; 5 ft (1.52 m) bogies; 26 ft (7.92 m) total

Victorian Railways narrow gauge passenger carriages and guards vans
- Narrow gauge carriage N7B
- Design code: ^{N}B^{B}, later NB
- Fleet numbers: 7–23NB
- Capacity: 40 passengers

From 1906 the design of passenger-accommodating carriages on the narrow gauge was updated to reflect more modern design principles. Instead of coupled pairs of American-inspired saloon carriages, miniature versions of normal broad-gauge rolling stock were constructed with compartment interiors, accessed by outward-swinging doors with full-length footboards provided. The new general design was a clerestory-roof carriage with fifteen windows each side and three on the ends.

The second-class ^{N}B^{B} carriages were split into five equal compartments each seating eight passengers across two benches for a total capacity of 40 second-class passengers, with the outermost compartment at one end for smoking passengers and at the other for ladies.

The ^{N}AB^{AB} carriages had six compartments, the outer two seating eight smoking passengers of first and second class respectively, the middle two seating four, and the inner two seating four ladies, each with access to an offset lavatory, for a total of 16 first and 16 second class passengers. The seating was sprung, and upholstered with leather for first class and duck for second class passengers. Each compartment was provided with a single pintsch gas lamp. Sandwiched between the two ladies' lavatory half-compartments was a 125 imp gal (570 L) water tank, from floor to ceiling. Each compartment was separated by a full-height partition.

The compartment cars were the only ones provided with non-standard underframes, 29 feet 6 inches (8.99 m) long in steel with truss rods fitted, and using "more elaborate" equalised bogies with a 5 feet (1.5 m) wheelbase at 21 feet (6.4 m) centres.

Five carriages entered service from late 1906 through mid 1907, initially 1^{N}AB^{AB}, 7^{N}B^{B} and 8^{N}B^{B} in December 1906, joined by 9^{N}B^{B} in January 1907 and 2^{N}AB^{AB} in July 1907 all for the Gembrook line. The next delivery was 3 and 4 ^{N}AB^{AB} for the then-under-construction Walhalla line, entering service in September 1909, delivered alongside 1^{N}D^{D}.

Under the 1910 recoding scheme, the ^{N}B^{B}s of both types reclassed as NB, the ^{N}AB^{AB} to NAB. That year also saw 10NB constructed, as the first compartment style carriage delivered with the new code; the latter vehicle was recorded entering service only four days after Saloon type composite van 7NBC, but it is not clear whether 10NB was provided to the Walhalla line, or why it was constructed to the new compartment style rather than the old saloon style designed to pair with the NBC type. However, 10NB was present on the Walhalla line as of 1940, along with 14NB and 27NB ex 4NAB.

In 1911 the Colac to Beech Forest line was extended to Crowes, and in December 1912 cars 11–14NB were constructed to reflect both that and increased traffic elsewhere on the system; they entered service shortly after van 2NC. These were followed by cars 15–17NB in December 1914, then 18–23NB in 1915. The total build was 21 vehicles.

In 1917 4NAB was relettered as pure second class and recoded as 24NB, a third variant of the type. The other three NAB vehicles were similarly converted in 1923, 1NAB through 3NAB becoming 25–27NB. respectively. First class passenger accommodation on the Gembrook and Walhalla lines was abolished on 9 July 1923, with fares adjusted accordingly. 1 and 2NAB were converted at Upper Ferntree Gully, while 3NAB was converted at Moe; this makes it likely that the composite cars kept their original allocations through that point, and that the 1917 conversion of 4NAB to 24NB was made to reflect demand on the Moe - Walhalla line. When the cars were converted the original second-class Ladies compartment was reallocated for smokers, in lieu of the original 2nd class smoking compartment. Thus, the total capacity of 32 passengers was 4 ladies, 12 smokers and 16 non-smokers.

Automatic couplers were fitted in lieu of the original Chopper style progressively between 1926 and 1928.

The NB cars were withdrawn in four batches. 1938 saw the loss of 8, 15 and 16NB, followed by 9, 11, 13 and 17–22 inclusive in 1949. 7, 10 and 14 were withdrawn in 1951, and the last pair, 12 and 23, in 1955.

25NB, formerly 1NAB, was scrapped in 1940, followed by 27NB ex 3NAB in 1951. Both 24NB and 26NB were recorded as scrapped in 1954 with the bodies recycled, but the latter "returned to register" in 1957.

Puffing Billy Railway currently has former NABs 2 and 4 in service as 26NAC and 24NB respectively. The Railway also has 8NB and 14NB awaiting restoration.

=== Guard's vans ===
Guard's vans
- 1NC post recode
- Design code: ^{N}D^{D}, later NC
- Fleet numbers: 1^{N}D^{D}, 1–6NC
- Capacity: 4 long tons (4.1 t)

Specifications
- Car length: 20 ft 6 in (6.25 m) over body; 27 ft 3 3/4 in (8.32 m) over couplers
- Width: 6 ft 7 in (2.01 m)
- Height: 9 ft 9 in (2.97 m)
- Wheelbase: 17 ft 0 in (5.18 m) between bogie centres; 3 ft 3 in (0.99 m) bogies; 20 ft 3 in (6.17 m) total

The full brakevan design was introduced in 1909 with 1^{N}D^{D}, built at Newport Workshops and delivered to the under-construction Walhalla line at the same time as compartment carriages 3 and 4^{N}AB^{AB}, all three entering service on the same day. Unlike those two compartment carriages, it had a design identical to the earlier ^{N}BD^{BD} vans except that the whole length of the van was reserved for the Guard and goods accommodation, with additional shelving in lieu of the seven seats and lavatory compartment. The roof of the van was slightly taller, matching the compartment cars at 9 ft 9 in (2.97 m) rather than 9 ft 4.875 in (2.86703 m) of the earlier stock. Only three lamps were provided along the clerestory roof rather than four, and the only side windows were in the central double sliding doors and the booking office window, plus three viewing windows either end.

The first van was provided on the Walhalla line in anticipation of high goods loading, enough to justify running separate goods trains instead of a service restricted to Mixed trains, but the railway arrived in Walhalla just as the gold mines were shutting down and the wealth was moving out so that was not achieved.

Under the 1910 recoding scheme, 1^{N}D^{D} was recoded to 1NC.

In 1911 the Colac to Beech Forest line was extended to Crowes, and in 1912 van 2NC was constructed for the line to reflect that. Vans 3, 4 and 5NC were built in 1914; the latter known to be specifically for the Crowes line because it had a stove fitted like that in 5NBC. then 6NC was built for the Gembrook line in 1919, entering service shortly after the final batch of NBH cars.

Automatic couplers were fitted in lieu of the original Chopper style progressively between 1926 and 1928.

A photo of 3NC at Wangaratta in November 1937 shows it had been rebuilt with steel sheeting over the timber sides.

1NC was scrapped in 1954, followed by 4NC in 1957. 6 was officially scrapped in 1955, but the body has since been recovered by Puffing Billy. 2, 3 and 5NC do not have recorded scrapping dates. Of these, 2NC had been recommended for scrapping at Wangaratta in November 1953, but instead it was overhauled at Newport Workshops then transferred to Colac. The other two units, 3 and 5NC, remained in Victorian Railways service until transferred to the Emerald Tourist Railway Board.

Puffing Billy Railway currently has vans 2NC and 5NC in service. The Railway also has 3NC and 6NC awaiting restoration. 3NC was notable as one of the original Puffing Billy Preservation Society vehicles.

=== Excursion cars ===
==== ^{N}QR open trucks in holiday traffic ====
Seated Trucks
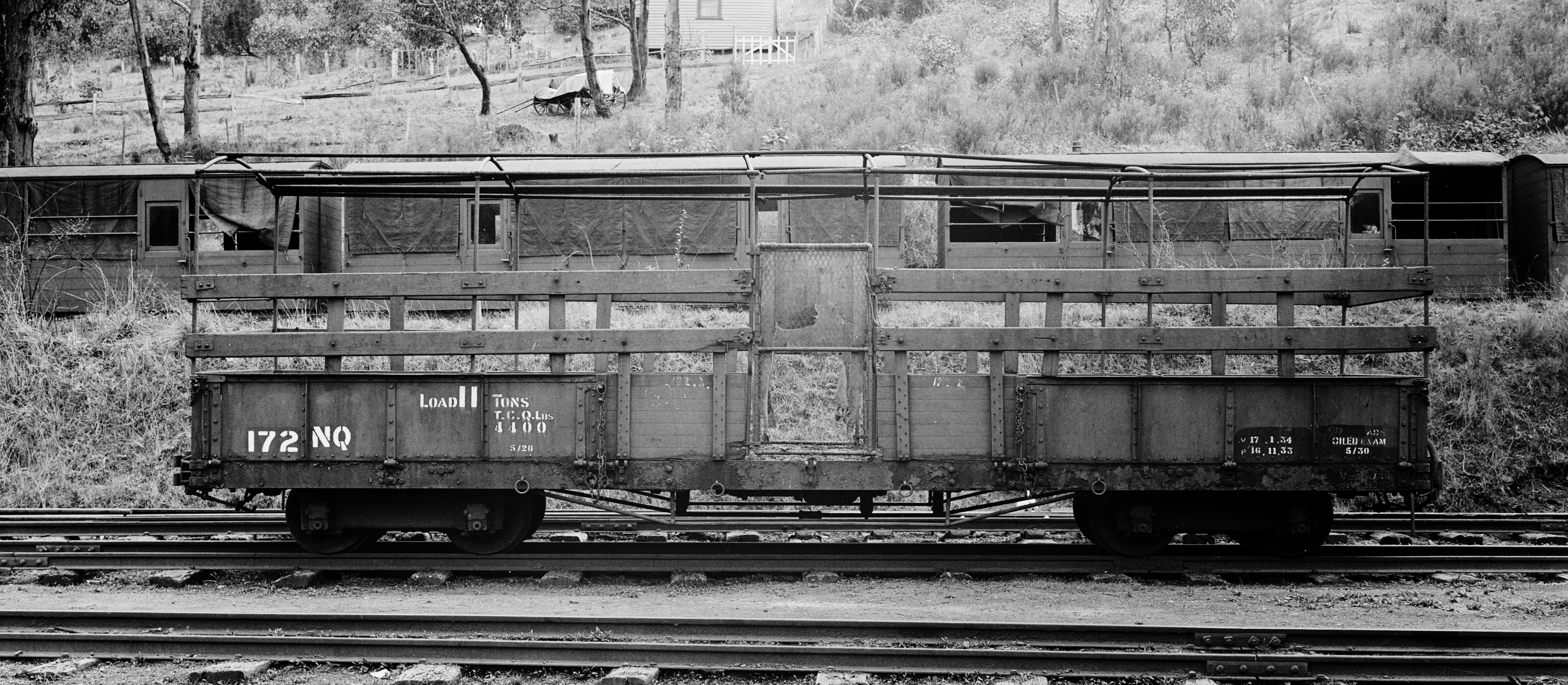
- Wagon 172NQ fitted with steel and timber framework for passengers
- Manufacturer: Victorian Railways at Newport Workshops
- Design code: NQR, NQ
- Fleet numbers: As required, in range 1-218 inclusive.
- Capacity: 32 passengers

In cases of temporary high traffic, such as early in the Whitfield line's history or high tourism seasons on the Gembrook and Walhalla lines, a number of ^{N}QR open trucks were fitted with seats or cushions and a canvas roof supported on a steel framework, with wood battens higher up the truck sides and a single central door for passenger access, fitted with an iron gate. Each "seated truck" was provided with six cushions and two stepladders, ordinarily stored at Newport and deployed in advance of the predicted traffic.

The superscript ^{N}QR code nominally changed to normal-script NQR around 1910, though the roll-out of the code alteration took quite a few years.

Following the first world war traffic on the Upper Ferntree Gully to Gembrook line increased drastically, and the Victorian Railways were ill-prepared to manage this. The last of the compartment-type carriages had entered service in 1915 and the traffic fluctuated through the year, so additional full-price passenger carriages that were only used occasionally would not have been a sensible investment. A proposal was made in 1916 to upgrade the existing seated trucks for passenger use by fitting a timber board, 12 in (300 mm) wide and the length of the carriage to support three gas lamps, which would be piped via flexible pipes to an underfloor tank. The tank could be mounted in the same position as on the NB and NBC cars, which shared the same underframe design. While this was not proceeded with, six ^{N}QR open trucks were stripped down to bare underframes and had new carriage bodies provided, becoming the NBH class carriages, with more built to that design in later years.

Some of the original skeletal-framework NQ trucks retained their fittings and were used in sheep traffic when not required for excursion trains. Six trucks were provided with cut-down versions of the same design specifically for sheep traffic, but it is not clear whether those were conversions from former seated trucks or new fittings for other NQ wagons, though a photo at Beech Forest in 1912 shows an NQ truck in sheep mode with the lowered roof.

Trucks ^{N}QR 114 and 140 were identified as having vertical screw-type hand brakes fitted in lieu of the normal end-of-wagon horizontal hand brake, permitting their use in lieu of brake vans. As of 1919 this was only permitted on the Gembrook line, and only for trains towards Melbourne in holiday traffic, but permission was later granted for the same practice on the Walhalla line. Notably, this modification is not reflected in Vincent's transcribed Rolling Stock Register for either truck. Both were recorded as sold privately in 1954. Note that it is not confirmed that either truck was fitted with the seated truck skeleton.

It is known that twelve NQR trucks fitted with the framework for passenger conversion were present on the Walhalla line through the late 1930s to early 1940s, as they were specifically allocated to known excursion trips.

Trucks known to have the full skeleton, based on photographs, include 65NQ, 86NQ and 172NQ. Taking into account available photos and timelines, it seems unlikely that more than 50 trucks were fitted.

Five more NQRs, numbered 219–223, were built between 1990 and 1992 by the Puffing Billy Railway, initially for passenger use and fitted with modified removable shelter frames. These have been used at times in fixed consists, but have been mixed with regular NBH carriages in regular service as well.

==== NBH holiday stock ====
Excursion Class
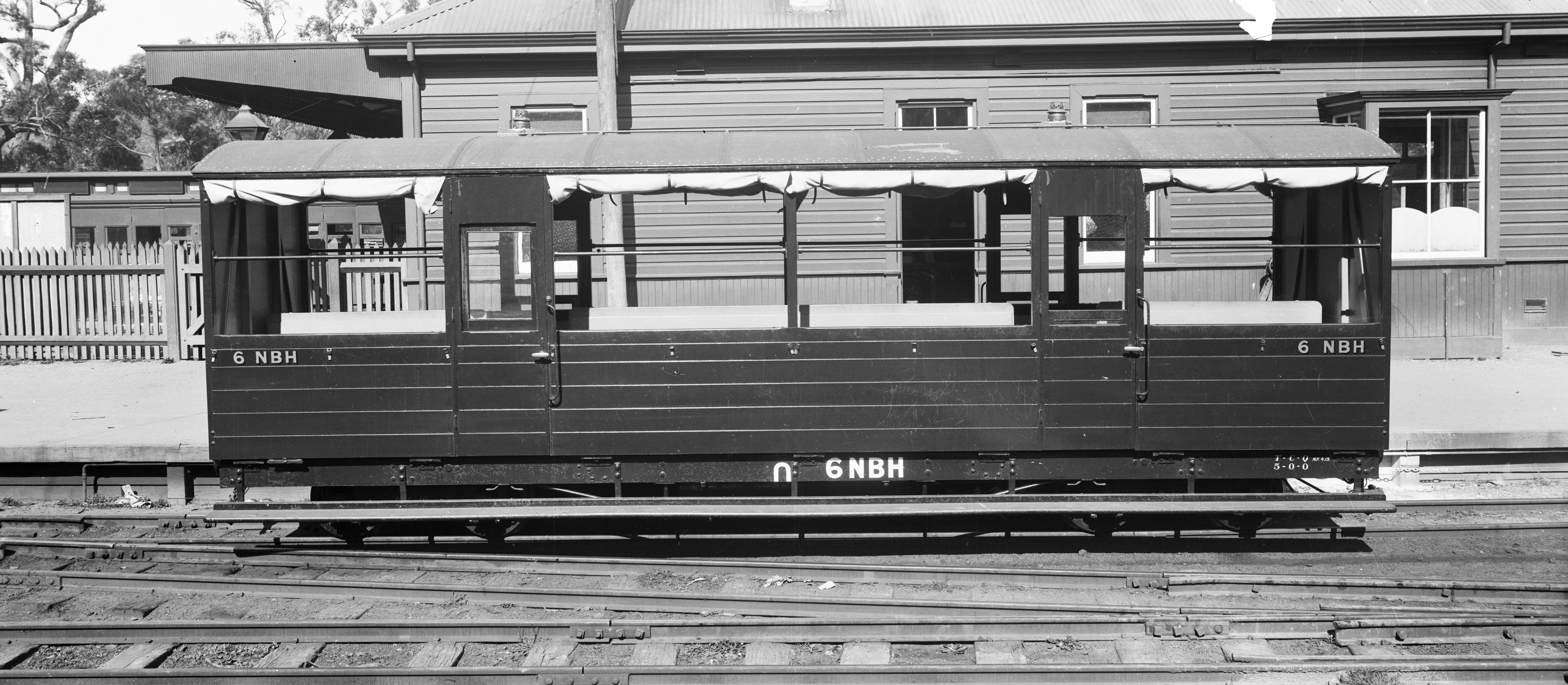
- Narrow gauge carriage 6NBH at Upper Fern Tree Gully.jpg
- Manufacturer: Victorian Railways at Newport Workshops
- Design code: NBH, NBHC
- Fleet numbers: 1–23
- Capacity: 32 passengers, later 28

To cater for increased excursion traffic on the Gembrook line, without the high cost of fully-glazed passenger carriages, six NQR trucks (No's 31, 33, 36, 38, 39 and 46) were returned to Newport Workshops around the end of World War I. These trucks had their steel sides and ends along with all associated fittings removed, and a new body was provided in lieu. These used a hardwood skeleton with hoop pine planking for the roofs, floors, sides and ends. Each side had two single-doors with a glazed drop window panel integrated, and canvas blinds were provided that could be lowered and tied down in poor weather conditions. Seating was provided as three double-sided benches along the centre, with 1 ft 8 in (0.51 m) wide gaps in line with the doors. As new, the NBH carriages were fitted with full-length footboards either side, reduced by the 1940s to shorter footboards only in line with the doors. As new, the carriages did not have separate hand brakes and relied entirely on the air brakes worked by a coupled locomotive. This would have made them incompatible with operation on, say, the Walhalla line which required trains to apply specified numbers of handbrakes when running downhill.

Following the broad-gauge tradition the "H" suffix indicated that the cars were only to be used for excursion traffic as required, because their accommodation was not of the same standard that regular passengers would have expected.

These vehicles all shared the standard goods vehicle underframe design, including bogie spacing. They were rated to carry 32 passengers each.

The six NBH cars entered service on April 12, 1919 and operated for 41 days with a single bar across the window openings, after which the second, lower bar was provided when the Victorian Railways accepted that passengers were going to sit on the window sills no matter what the official position was.

Later in 1919, a further nine NBH vehicles were constructed, and these entered service as 7–15NBH on 8 December that year.

The carriages were exclusively used between Upper Ferntree Gully and Gembrook until 1958, when the remaining 8 NBHs (3–4, 6–7, 9–11 & 13) were transferred to Colac for Australian Railway Historical Society trips on the Beech Forest line until its closure 1962.

The NBH carriages slowly fell into disuse from the 1930s and some were written off, with 1, 5 and 15 known to have been officially scrapped. However, in the early preservation era the Puffing Billy Preservation Society was forbidden by the Victorian Railways to introduce new vehicles to the fleet, so over time the condemned NBH carriages were "restored" and entered service.

== Puffing Billy Railway ==
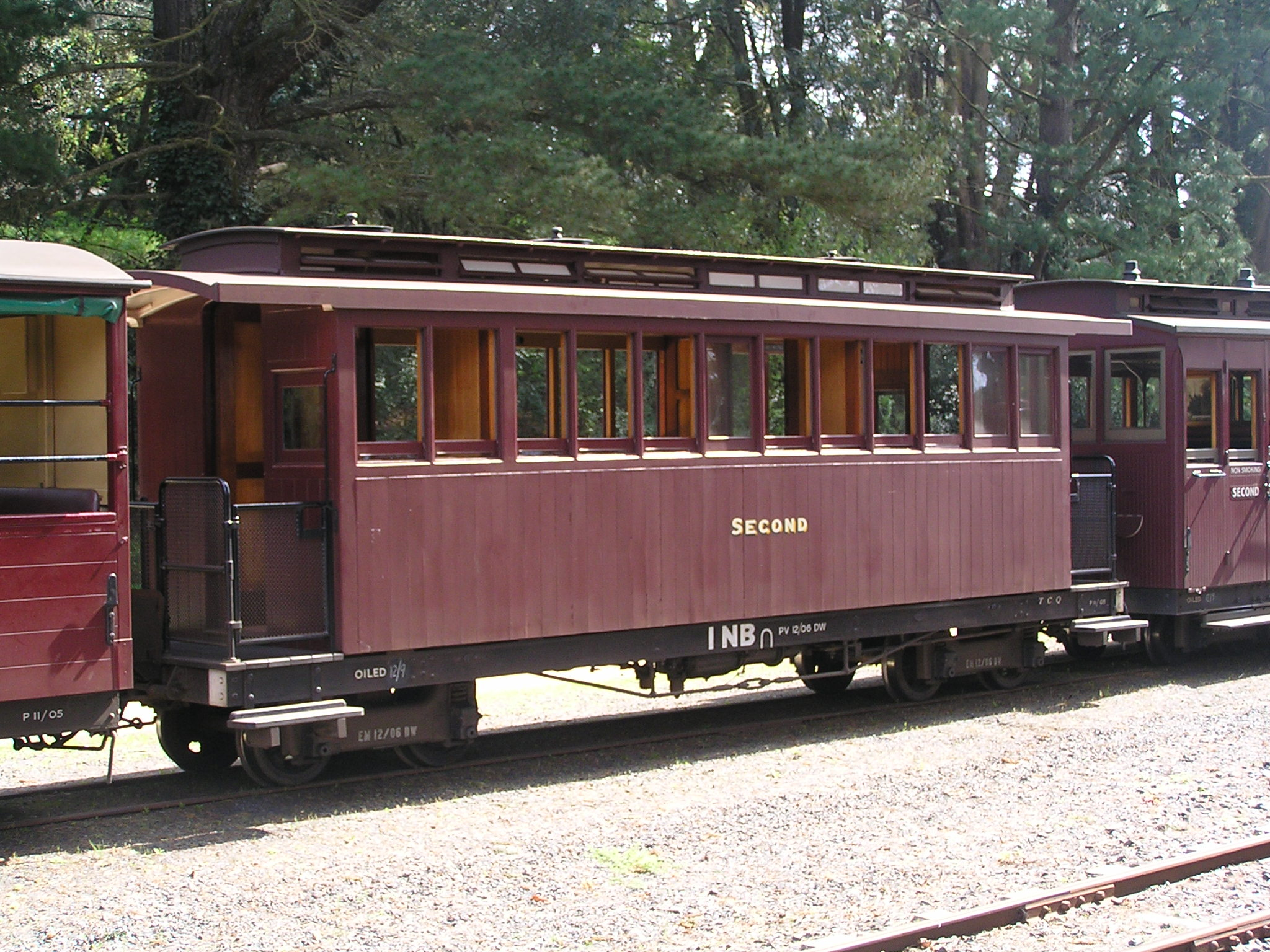
1NB preserved on the Puffing Billy Railway, restored in December 2005 to circa 1910 condition

Under the Puffing Billy Preservation Society and later the Emerald Tourist Railway Board's management, the fleet of the Belgrave to Gembrook line has increased significantly from when the Victorian Railways was in control.

=== Return to Belgrave ===
While the Gembrook line had been closed a number of carriages were used on the Colac and Beech Forest line for occasional tour trains. As the Gembrook line's restoration progressed, a special train ran from Colac to Belgrave across the weekend 5-6 May 1962; the reported consist was 689ZL - 73K - 129Q (carrying 7A) - 251HR - 118Q (carrying 2NBC and 2NBH) - 67Q (carrying 24NB) - 71Q (carrying 3NC and 14NBH) - 65Q (carrying 6NBH) - 613Z. The flat wagons were returned to Colac for a second transfer on 12-13 May, which was to collect the remaining eight NBH cars.

The second transfer was made as planned over the following weekend, worked by diesel locomotive T346. This time, the consist was 493Z - 73K - 129Q (carrying 6A) - 25HR (Note: The first week records 125HR, the second 25HR; either is plausible. Vincent notes 25HR ex I15103, 19i54-1978; and 125HR ex unknown I wagon, circa 1958-1976.) - 110Q (Note: This consist records 110Q twice, and aside from 65Q none of the other numbers match the previous transfer.) (empty) - 97Q (carrying 216NQ and 135NQ) - 65Q (carrying 13NBH and 10NBH) - 110Q (carrying 9 and 11 NBH) - 276Z. Unloading at Belgrave was assisted by engine 7A from the prior delivery.

=== NBH ===
The remaining four first-series NBH vehicles, and the "restored" 1 and 5NBH, have had hand-brakes fitted. 8NBH has been restored to as near as possible to its original condition, with individual tongue and groove boards, canvas blinds, unpadded seating and full-length running boards. All the other original remaining vehicles have had thick padding added to the seats, and their canvas window blinds replaced with vinyl blinds with clear panels built in. All of the vehicles (besides 8NBH) have also had their tongue-and-groove timber ends and sides replaced with plywood sheets including simulated v-joints for additional strength and ease of construction. The capacity of each carriage has also been reduced from 32 to 28 adult passengers, addressing comfort levels.

A few NBH vehicles also had fixed perspex panels fitted in lieu of the blinds to provide shelter and prevent people sitting on the handrails over a few winters, but this proved unpopular with the public and the experiment has not been repeated.

In 1981 two new vehicles were built to the original NBH design, as the 250th and 251st vehicles to use the standard narrow-gauge underframe design. These entered service as 16NBH and 17NBH.

1997 to 1998 saw a further six units added to the fleet, with steel body frames in lieu of timber and with wider windowsills but otherwise to the same design. 18NBH entered traffic on 19/4/1997; 19NBH on 5/12/1997; 20NBH on 19/12/1997, with the others added in 1998.

==== NBHC conversions ====
As many of the original NBC and NC guards vans were scrapped by the Victorian Railways, Puffing Billy needed to organise additional vehicles with guard's accommodation. To accomplish this, three NBH vehicles were converted—originally intended to be temporary—from their original designs, with the short section between a door and the end of the vehicle fitted with a handbrake, windows and a partition to act as a guard's compartment. The three vehicles are now 11, 21 and 22NBHC. 11NBHC was converted in 1976, and 21 and 22NBHC in 2005.

21 and 22NBHC had double doors fitted in one end to provide for wheelchair access.

Use of the NBHC cars in trains also removes the weight of a full-length guards van from each train, permitting additional passenger capacity within the length and weight limits and reduces turn-around time at each end of the line, obviating the need for the guard van to be shunted to the opposite end of the train but removing the visual aspect of a traditional-looking van in the rear.

With the addition of the guard's compartment, a C was added to the end of the classification to identify its use as a brakevan, whereas traditional Victorian Railways coding would have the C before the H, making it NBCH.

==== Extended NBH and NBHC ====
Excursion Class (extended)
- Design code: NBH, NBHC
- Fleet numbers: 24–31, 51–52NBH and 1–4NBHC

Around the same time that 16NBH and 17NBH entered service, a new experimental design of extended NBH was constructed. Identified as 51NBH, this vehicle had double-doors at both ends and fold-up seats, providing capacity for up to three wheelchairs at each end. The vehicle length is the same as the compartment-style NAB/NB carriages.

A second extended NBH, number 52, entered service in 1983.

While the cars were successful, they increased the carriage weight by a seventh and decreased capacity from 28 to 24 passengers.

In the 2010s, the Puffing Billy Railway began investigating options for increasing its passenger fleet to cater for increased tourist traffic, with an interest expressed in twelve additional carriages. This would be enough to form an extra block train, above the maximum four trains in service on the busiest days each year at present.

Various designs were considered with lengths between the original design and a conceptual 11-metre carriage seating 42 passengers, but the decision was made to construct the new carriages to the same length as the previous extended NBH units 51 and 52. The new carriages will be constructed with steel frames similar to 18–23NBH. The new fleet will enter service as eight regular extended NBH cars 24–31 (instead of, say, 53–59), and four NBHC vehicles featuring an enclosed guard's compartment with three rear windows similar to those in the NC vans, and capacity for up to 24 passengers, or 12 plus six wheelchairs, numbered 1–4NBHC.

The first new carriage frame was transferred from Belgrave to Emerald for panelling and fit-out on 11 December 2017.

=== 26NAC ===
Along with the NBH to NBHC conversions, carriage 26NB (formerly 2NAB) was restored as 26NAC, with the centre toilets removed and replaced with seating capacity, but one of the end compartments replaced with a guard's compartment. It re-entered service in 1987

=== 2NC ===
During 2NC's restoration it was fitted with extra seating capacity for staff members, or passengers only if absolutely necessary.

=== NAL/NBL and NBD ===
Four end-platform, "O" class carriages were built in the period 1901–1902 for the Tasmanian Mount Lyell Mining and Railway Company's 3'6" gauge railway. That line closed in 1963, and in 1964 four carriages (including the cost of transit across Bass Strait) were donated by that company to the Puffing Billy Railway. The Victorian Railways were initially hesitant to allow the new carriages to operate on the line, but eventually accepted them as replacements for existing carriages rather than as a fleet expansion. 7 As delivered the NBL cars had a capacity of 36 passengers, with bench seating arranged in a 2+2 configuration with rows facing each other. As of 2009, cars 1 and 2NAL had been reconfigured to seat 20 passengers, and cars 3 and 4NAL for 28 passengers.

The first unit delivered was former Mount Lyell carriage O5, which was reclassed 1NBL with the "L" reflecting the Mt. Lyell origin and perhaps a reference to the deluxe carriages Pioneer and Enterprise, later classed BL. O5 had been donated in November 1963 and delivered to the Puffing Billy Railway, free of charge, in January 1964. From there the coach proceeded to Newport Workshops, where its couplers, bogies and braking system were all converted to be compatible with the rest of the railway's fleet. It was later followed by classmates O2, O3 and O6. O2 and O3 arrived at the end of August 1964.

However, the Victorian Railways' fleet of NBH carriages had a maximum width of 6 ft 7 in (2.01 m), but the Mount Lyell cars were significantly wider at 7 ft 10 in (2.39 m). This raised the risk of adjacent NBL carriage verandahs striking each other when trains ran around curves. As a result, in the short term Mount Lyell cars were forbidden from coupling to each other, and in March 1965 the Victorian Railways advised that 1NBL would need to be returned to Newport Workshops so that its headstocks could be extended, creating a wider gap between carriages. Australian Railway History, January 2026 shows a Puffing Billy train hauled by 12NA with NBL cars as the 2nd and 5th cars of a 10-car consist (counting from the locomotive) at Menzies Creek on 25 January 1975.

After 1NBL entered service the remaining carriages followed. 1NBL was originally painted cream and red and used as its VIP carriage for special occasions, while the other vehicles were restored for regular use and painted all-over red.

When the Railway embarked on its Luncheon Train and Night Train services in the 1990s, the NBL cars were fitted with upgraded seating and gates in the end-platform railings, reclassed as NAL to reflect their first-class use and repainted in red with ornate gold lining. The cars were named after stations on the Mt. Lyell line, 1 through 4 respectively as Mt Lyell, Rinadeena, Teepookana and Dubbil Barril. Photos by Weston Langford show 1, 3 and 4NBL in 1990, 1989 and 1996 respectively, and 3NAL in 1999.

1NB (saloon type) was restored in the early 2000s to reflect its configuration of about 1910. After it re-entered service in December 2005, its classmate 5NBD, which in 1974 had been modified with a guard's compartment installed as well as carpet and a 2+1 seating arrangement, was refitted as a temporary catering car for use on the Lunch and Dinner services in conjunction with the NAL carriages.

The 2+1 cross-bench seats were removed and replaced with food preparation equipment.

Prior to the use of 5NBD as the catering car, the Luncheon train consist generally ran with 2NBC at the Belgrave end.

== Walhalla Goldfields Railway ==
As the Walhalla Goldfields Railway was re-opened long after Puffing Billy was established, rolling stock available for restoration was difficult to acquire. To overcome this, the railway constructed a new batch of narrow gauge vehicles based on the Victorian Railways designs and coded similarly, but with a "W" suffix. The vehicles were constructed on underframes recycled from coal wagons previously operated by the State Electricity Commission of Victoria, so they are longer and wider than the equivalent Puffing Billy vehicles.

=== NBW ===
Two NBW carriages exist, approximating a wider, stretched version of the NBB/NB saloon type carriages with end platforms. Each seats 36 passengers.

=== NBCW ===
A single guards van was built for the Walhalla Goldfields Railway, featuring a 16-seat saloon area and a guards van similar to the layout of the NBDBD/NBC vans.

=== NQRW ===
One wagon was fitted out with a framework for supporting a temporary roof, similar to the original sheltered NQR design. In 2016 the wagon was remodelled and fitted with end-of-train equipment, allowing it to be substituted for the NBCW when necessary.

=== Railmotors ===
The Walhalla Goldfields Railway has also acquired two former X1-class trams. In the short term, X1 461 is planned to be converted to function as a diesel-powered railmotor with capacity for 28 passengers and one wheelchair, and eventually, X1 463 may be converted into a trailing unit.
