= Driffield Street =

Street in Queenstown, Tasmania, Australia

Driffield Street, Queenstown is the main north to south street of Queenstown, Tasmania, Australia.

It commences at a junction with Lyell Highway, and runs parallel to the railway station, railway yard and railway as far as Henry Street.

It is also the location of the Galley Museum, and the Queenstown Library (also known as the Robert Carl Sticht Memorial library).

The prominent Empire Hotel is on the corner of Orr Street. It is also the location of St Martin's Hall.

In the era of the operations of the Mount Lyell Mining and Railway Company it was the location of retail businesses run by the company, as well as the railway.

== See also ==
- Main Street, Zeehan
