= Queenstown to Strahan road =

Road in Tasmania, Australia

Queenstown to Strahan Road Tasmania
- Type: Rural road

Queenstown to Strahan road (also Strahan to Queenstown road) is a road that connects Queenstown with Strahan in Western Tasmania.

It was preceded by the Mount Lyell railway (now known as the West Coast Wilderness Railway) which from the 1890s to the 1960s was the main means of transport between the two towns. Earlier tracks existed, but were not in any way suitable for vehicles.

It was proposed and petitioned about in the early 1930s it was opened in the late 1930s, but required maintenance work in the 1940s.

The road leaves Queenstown by rising to Howards Plains where it has a junction with the Zeehan Highway. A little further south west of the junction it runs past the Queenstown airport.

The road runs on the ridge that divides the catchment of the Tully and Henty River to the north, and the immediate King River tributary creeks to the south. At one point, it runs very close to the alignment of the Mount Lyell Railway as it descends into the King River gorge.
