= Howard's Plains, Tasmania =

Plain west of Queenstown, Tasmania, Australia

Howard's Plains is a plain just west and above the river valley location of Queenstown in Western Tasmania, Australia. It is located to the east of the Henty River catchment area.

It is the location of the junction of the Zeehan Highway and the Queenstown to Strahan road, and the Queenstown, Tasmania aerodrome.

It was not until 1934 that the road out of Queenstown up onto the plain was constructed, utilising unemployed workers.

The completion of the Penghana to Howard's Plains road led to the eventual construction of the Queenstown to Strahan road, and the road to Zeehan in the late 1930s and early 1940s.

In the southern area, it is the location of tailings dams created by the Mount Lyell remediation scheme that are situated above the Queen River.
