= Zeehan-Strahan Road =

Road in Tasmania, Australia

Zeehan-Strahan Road Tasmania
- Type: Rural road

Zeehan-Strahan Road (also known as the Strahan to Zeehan road) is a road that links Strahan with Zeehan in Western Tasmania.

It runs parallel to Ocean Beach for a distance and crosses the Henty River at the beach's northern end, before turning inland.

In the 1920s, the main means of transport between the main centres of the west coast was by the available railways. Between Zeehan and Strahan, the only form of track was via Ocean Beach, otherwise the main mode was by the Strahan-Zeehan Railway. The feasibility of road connections was considered in terms of being able to allow for heavy haulage of ore and timber.

The importance of the construction of roads in the West Coast was recognised in the 1920s but materialised in the 1960s or later.

Following the early rough stages of the Zeehan Highway and the Strahan to Queenstown road it was possible to travel between Zeehan and Strahan in the 1940s.

Following the demise of the railways in the 1960s, and the use of the new Zeehan Highway between Queenstown and Zeehan, some decades later the formation of the earlier railway was in part utilised for the new Zeehan to Strahan road.
