= Lynchford =

Locality and stopping place on Mount Lyell railway, Tasmania, Australia

Coordinates: 42.1169°S 145.5277°E

Lynchford is a locality and was a stopping place on the Mount Lyell railway line to Strahan, to the south of Queenstown in the Queen River valley. It was in its early days a gold mine location. It is now a stopping place on the West Coast Wilderness Railway.
