= Uee (disambiguation) =

Uee (born 1988) is a South Korean singer and actress.

UEE may also refer to:

- United All-England Eleven, an English cricket team formed in 1852
- Queenstown Airport (Tasmania) IATA code
