= Regatta Point =

Port and locality in Western Tasmania, Australia

Coordinates: 42.1605°S 145.3264°E

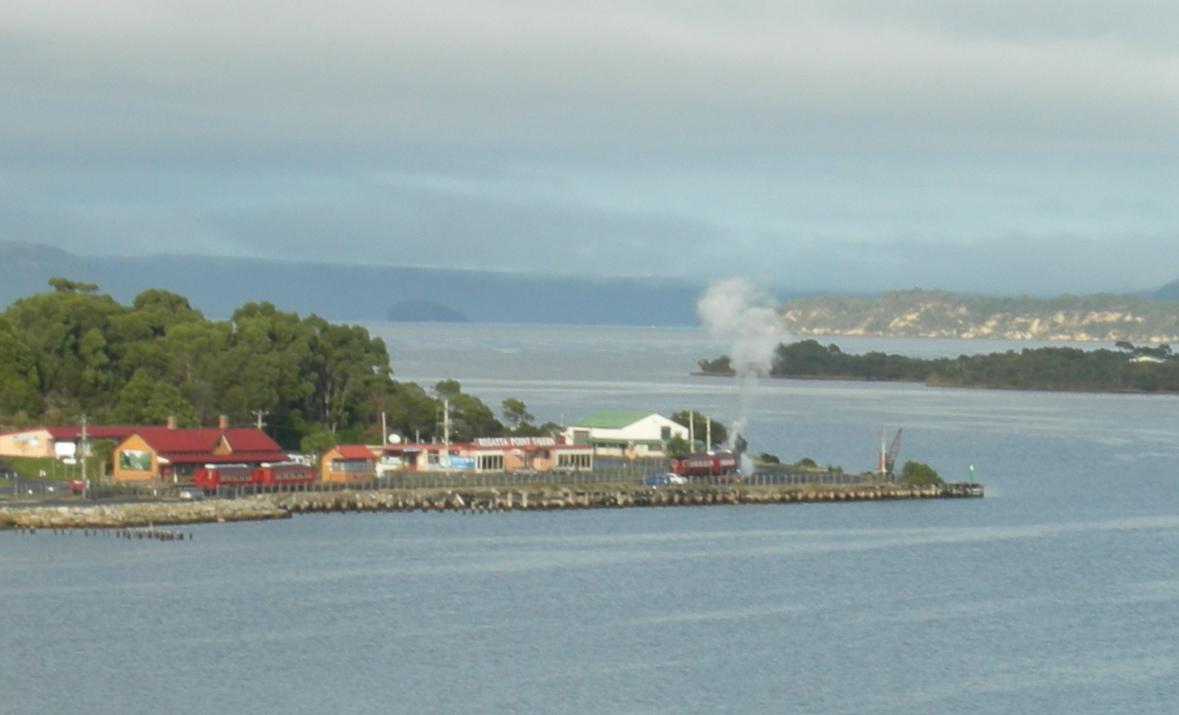
Viewed from Strahan in 2008

Regatta Point is the location of a port and on Macquarie Harbour, Tasmania.

== Port ==
Regatta Point is often assumed into the name of the locality across the bay in Macquarie Harbour, Strahan. The other ports in Macquarie Harbour were Strahan, and Pillinger at the southern end of the harbour. Most shipping through the notorious Hells Gates is now the fishing fleet.

The last sea-based delivery of explosives for the Mount Lyell Mining & Railway Company occurred as late as 1976.

== Railway terminus ==
It was the port and terminus of the Mount Lyell railway line from Queenstown. When fully operational before closure in the 1960s, it was the location of the transfer of Mount Lyell materials to ships.

Regatta Point was the location of the connection between the Mount Lyell private railway and the Zeehan to Strahan line, which passed through Strahan on the way to Zeehan.

=== Station ===
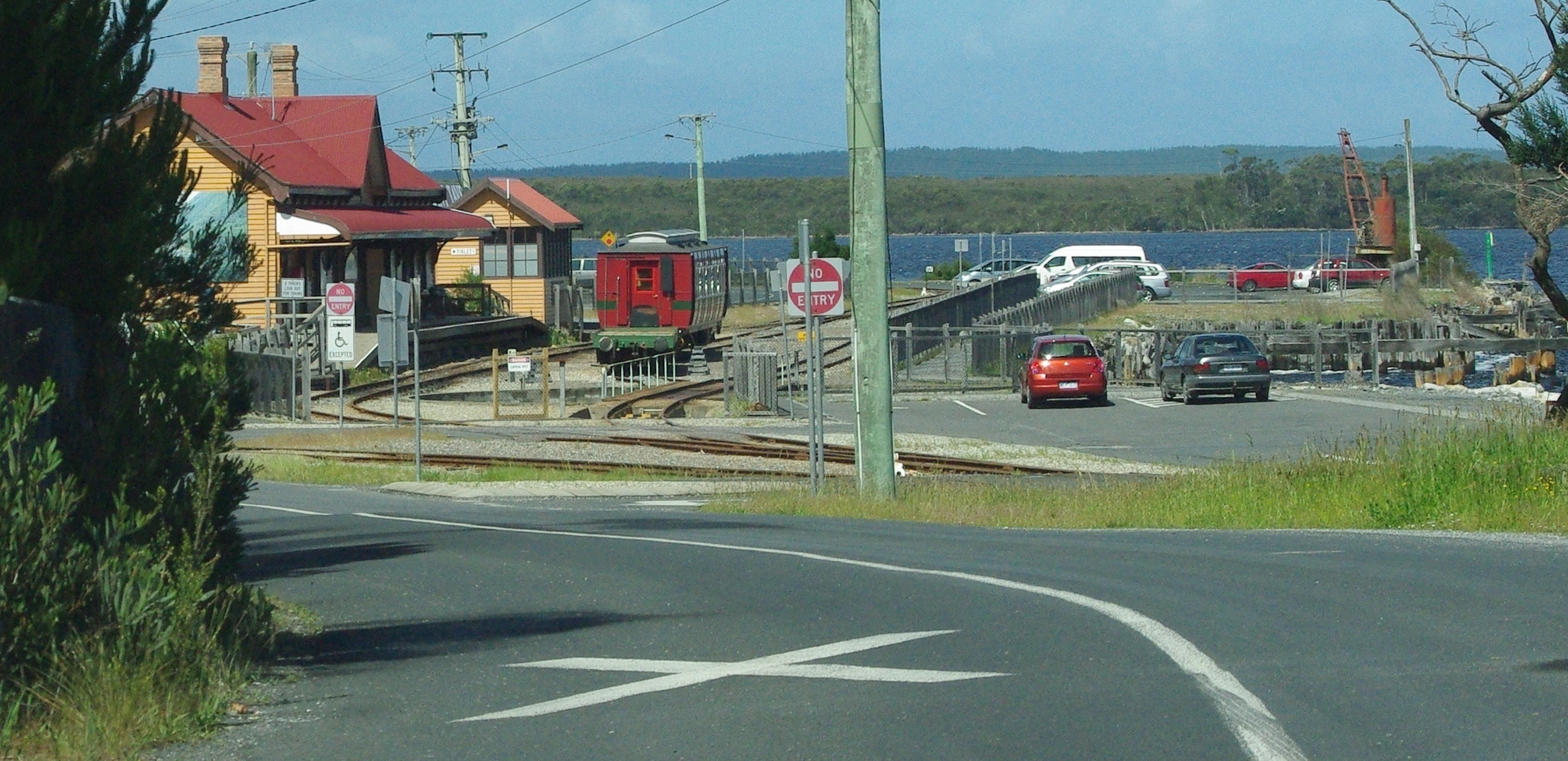
Station at left from the north in 2008, Macquarie Harbour at rear, former wharf at right

An earlier building at the station location was burnt down in 1900. It is currently the West Coast Wilderness Railway terminus. The remaining station building at Regatta Point has been restored for the new service, having lain at risk from the 1960s to the 1990s.

== Nearest ports ==
Outside of Macquarie Harbour – on the north coast of Tasmania – Burnie or the southeast Hobart – smaller anchorages exist in between – but are either facility-free Port Davey or dangerous Trial Harbour.
