= Zeehan Highway =

Road in Tasmania, Australia

Zeehan Highway Tasmania

General information
- Type: Highway
- Route number(s): A10; Queenstown — Zeehan; B27; Zeehan — Lyell Highway
- Former route number: State Route 8

Major junctions
- South end: Lyell Highway; Queenstown
- Anthony Road; Murchison Highway
- North end: Main Street; Henty Road; Zeehan

Location(s)
- Major settlements: Queenstown, Zeehan

Highway system
- Highways in Australia; National Highway • Freeways in Australia; Highways in Tasmania

The Zeehan Highway (also known as the Queenstown–Zeehan road) is a road in Western Tasmania linking Queenstown and Zeehan.

The highway departs from Queenstown on higher ground at Howards Plains, where it also connects with the Queenstown to Strahan road. North of Queenstown it provides access to the Lake Margaret Power Station and Anthony Road. It crosses the Dundas, Henty, and Yolande rivers.

Although proposals for the road were raised as early as 1910, planning began in the 1930s, following the completion of the Lyell Highway.

The highway was not completed until the 1960s. Until that time the Mount Lyell Mining and Railway Company transported copper from Queenstown by the Mount Lyell railway (later the West Coast Wilderness Railway) to Strahan for shipping. After completion, the highway formed part of the route used by trucks hauling copper ore from the Queenstown mine to Melba Flats between 1962 and 1994.

The Zeehan Highway also serves as an alternative route between Strahan and Zeehan if the Zeehan to Strahan road is closed.
