= Galley Museum =

Museum in Queenstown, Tasmania

The Eric Thomas Galley Museum
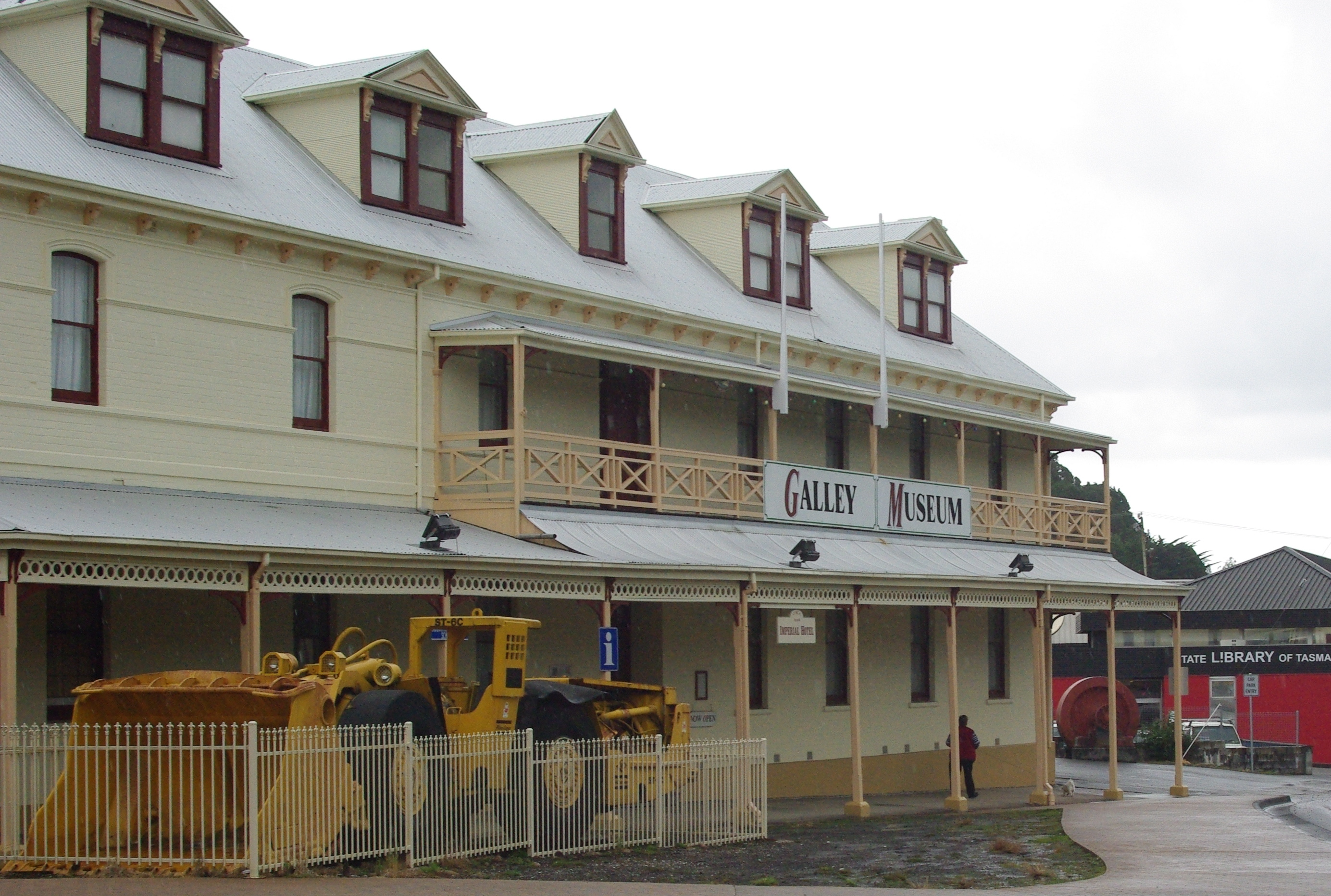
- Location: Queenstown, Tasmania
- Coordinates: 42.07835°S 145.55671°E

Imperial Hotel
- Interactive map of the Imperial Hotel area

General information
- Location: Queenstown, Tasmania
- Completed: 1897

The Eric Thomas Galley Museum (also known as the Galley Museum) is a photographic and general museum in Driffield Street in Queenstown.

One of two west coast Tasmania museums that house records and relics from the mining communities of the past, the museum is housed in a former 1897 constructed the Imperial Hotel, which has also been a mining office and Youth Hostel.

As a repository of the historical photographs and materials from the history of Queenstown it contains collections that hold in some cases the last vestiges of the former mines and localities on the west coast.

The collection of photographs and text and materials relating to the 1912 North Mount Lyell Mining disaster is extensive.

Considerable parts of the photograph collection were photographs collected by and also processed by Eric Thomas.

An object from the museum was utilised in a 10 objects 10 stories exhibition in Hobart in 2016.

== See also ==
- West Coast Heritage Centre
