= Teepookana =

Former community in Western Tasmania, Australia

Teepookana was a short lived port, community and railway stopping place on the southern bank of the King River, in Western Tasmania.

== Port and railway station ==
It was important as a port during the construction of the railway between Regatta Point and Teepookana in the late nineteenth century. It was located between the two railway bridges that cross the King River.

Following the completion of the railway the community diminished in size and importance, however it is still listed in railway information for the West Coast Wilderness Railway.

== Teepookana Plateau ==
Teepookana Plateau, Tasmania (42°11′S 145°23′E) is high ground adjacent to the King River, the site of forest reserves and forested areas to the west of the West Coast Range and Mount Jukes in the West Coast of Tasmania.

It is within a few kilometres south of the location and railway line.
