= Rinadeena =

Railway station in Tasmania, Australia

Coordinates: 42.1531°S 145.4957°E

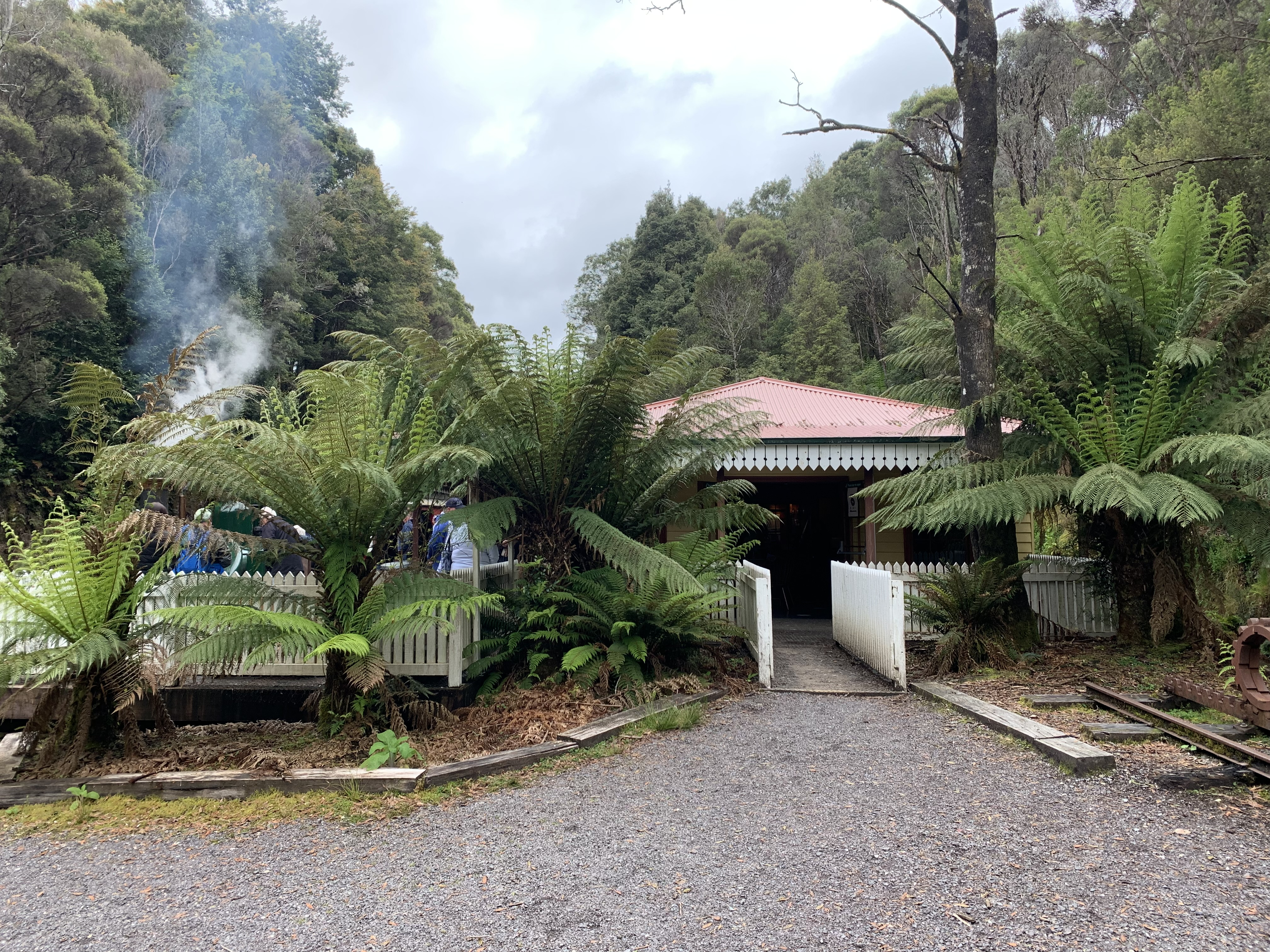
Rinadeena station and gift shop in 2022

Rinadeena is railway station and stopping place on the West Coast Wilderness Railway in Tasmania, Australia.

When the original Mount Lyell railway line was being built, it was the location of some significant landslips. In the time of operations of the Mount Lyell railway landslips continued.

In the event of wildfires in the adjacent district, with little to prevent fires affecting the railway line and Rinadeena structures, losses were inevitable in the past.

Since rebuilding of the West Coast Wilderness Railway it is also the location of a serious accident.

It is the highest point on the railway line, with Abt mechanisms on the steam locomotives required from either side of operations.

The Abt fittings on the track proceed upward from Hall's Creek on the Queenstown side, and from Rinadeens downward to Dubbil Barril on the Regatta Point side.
