= Strahan Airport =

Airport at Strahan, Tasmania, Australia

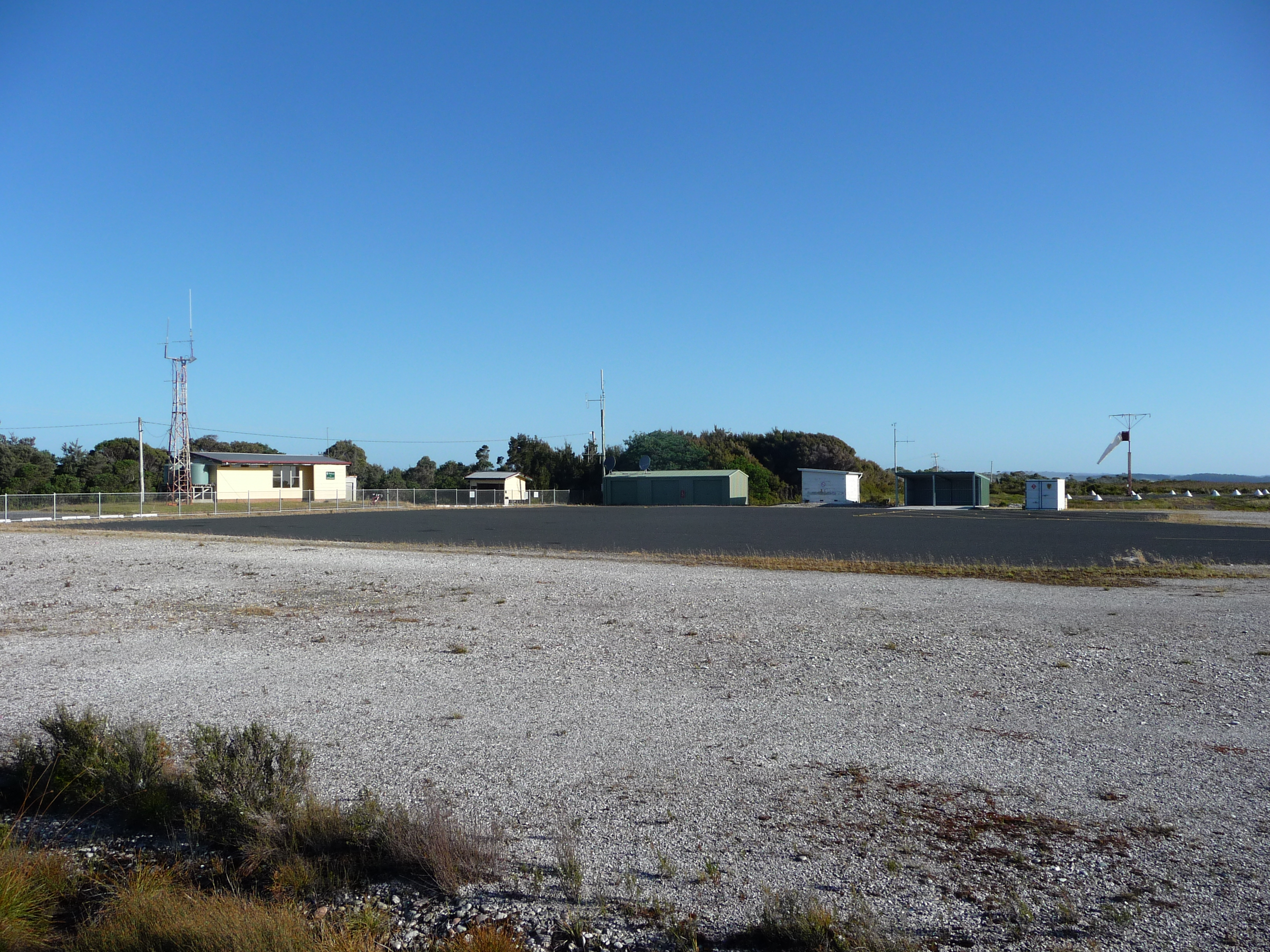
- Strahan Airport facilities from edge of aircraft parking apron looking southeast, 2014
- IATA: SRN; ICAO: YSRN

Summary
- Airport type: Public
- Owner/Operator: West Coast Council
- Serves: West Coast, Tasmania
- Location: Strahan, Tasmania
- Elevation AMSL: 66 ft (20 m)
- Coordinates: 42°09′20″S 145°17′29″E

Maps
- Location in Tasmania
- Interactive map of Strahan Airport

Runways
Direction	Length		Surface
Direction	m	ft	Surface
18/36	1,220	4,003	Asphalt
- Sources: Australian AIP and aerodrome chart

Strahan Airport (IATA: SRN, ICAO: YSRN) is an airport located 2 nautical miles (3.7 km; 2.3 mi) west of Strahan, Tasmania, Australia. It is the main airport for the West Coast of Tasmania, and is owned and maintained by the West Coast Council. The need for an airport in the area was suggested in the 1950s, and suggestions for upgrades have occurred over time.

== History and facilities ==
Proposals for an aerodrome at Strahan were made in 1937, and 1950.

Strahan Airport, previously known as Strahan Aerodrome, has a north–south alignment and runs parallel to Ocean Beach. Like the rest of West Coast Tasmania, Strahan Airport airspace is controlled from Melbourne Airport in Victoria.

Helicopter and fixed wing flights operate from here for charter flights into the south-west wilderness area, or over locations in western Tasmania. In May 2019, Par Avion commenced a thrice weekly service between Hobart and Strahan.

Previously, in the 1970s, a runway was utilised at Howards Plains – just west of Queenstown and Strahan, and if weather conditions were difficult at Queenstown, Strahan would be the alternative landing location. Par Avion operated the service.

Lack of animal proof fencing has created a need for the landing strip to be checked and cleared before emergency landings by the Royal Flying Doctor Service.
