= Empire Hotel, Queenstown =

Heritage hotel in Queenstown, Tasmania

Empire Hotel
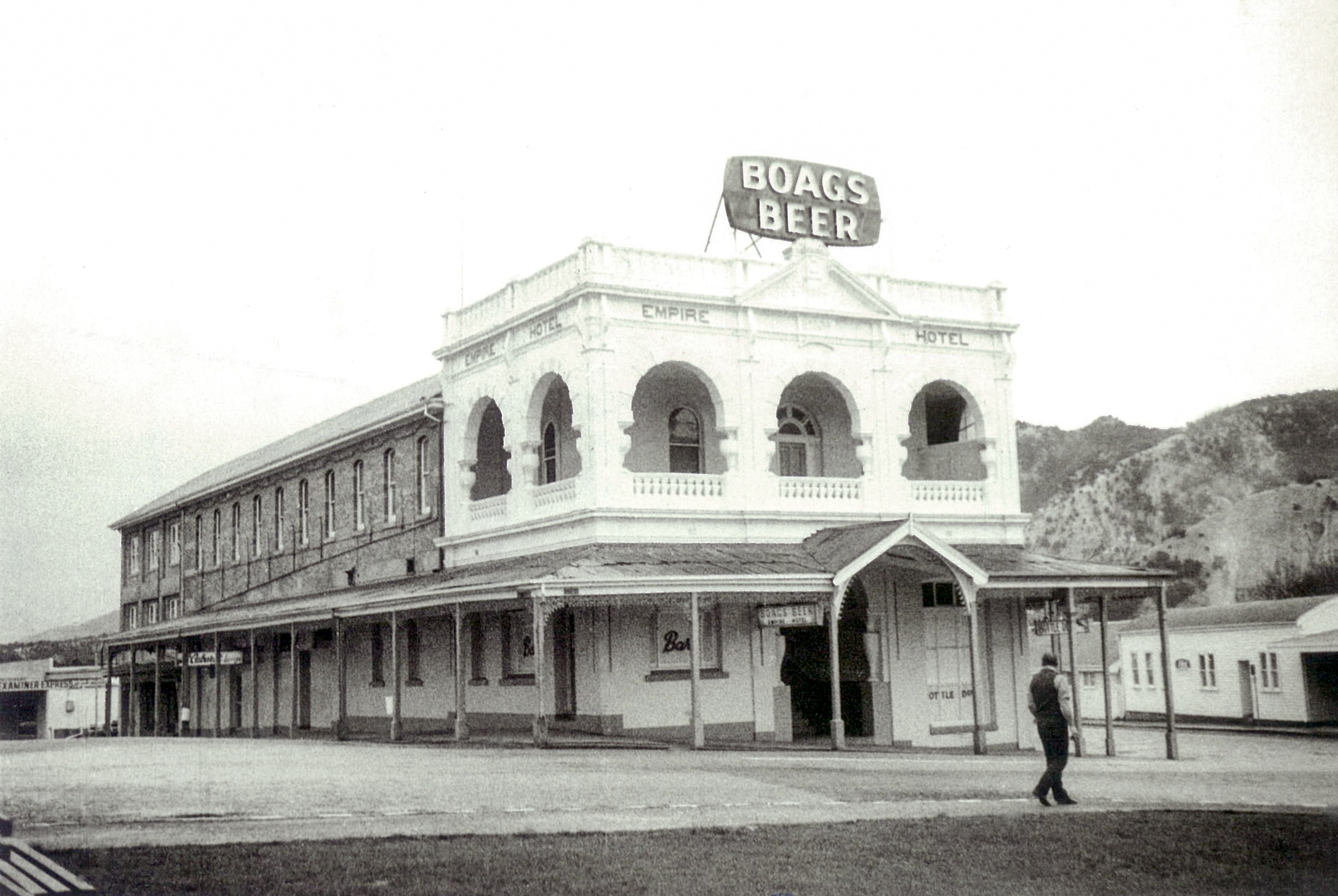

General information
- Status: renovated
- Location: 2 Orr Street; Queenstown, Tasmania
- Coordinates: 42°04′50″S 145°33′20″E
- Completed: 1901

The Empire Hotel, which has been called the "grand old lady" of the West Coast, is a landmark two-storey heritage listed building located in Queenstown, Tasmania, Australia. It is located on the corner of Orr and Driffield Streets, across the road from Queenstown railway station of the time. It was still in operation as of August, 2023

Construction was by James Wilson of Queenstown railway station for the developers Parer and Higgins and it has had several owners during its history. It was subject to annual visits by the Licensing Court, which checked for compliance with the requirements applicable to the interior and exterior of the hotel.

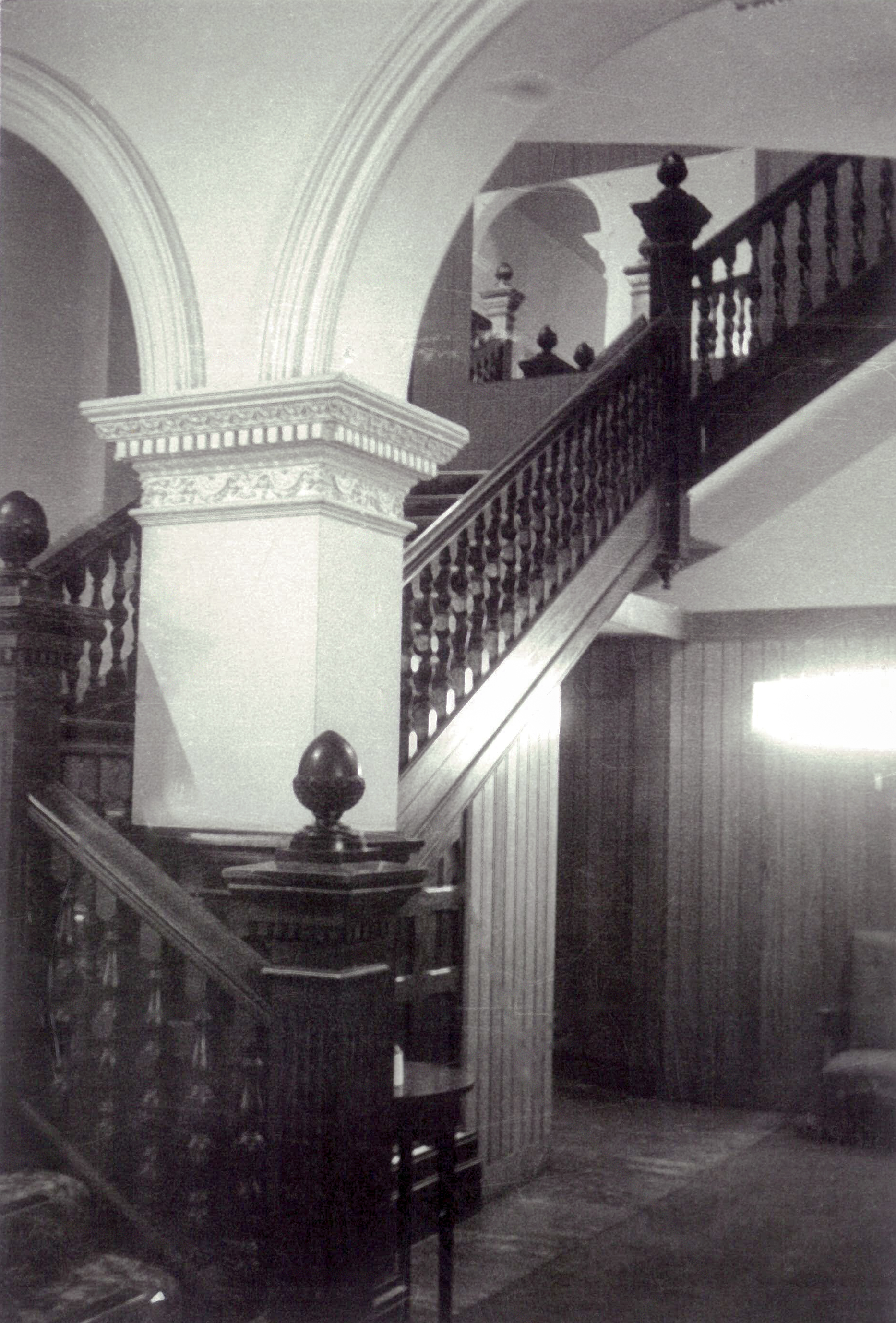
Empire Hotel, Queenstown, Tasmania Staircase made of Tasmanian Blackwood

The staircase is National Trust listed. It is made from Tasmanian Blackwood. The raw timber was shipped to England, carved and shipped back to Queenstown for installation.

The company Parer & Higgins owned by John Arthur Parer and William Higgins built and licensed The New Empire Hotel to Michael Parer as it was originally known for several years. It and several other hotels in Queenstown and the surrounding Zeehan district were owned by Parer's including the Imperial Hotel which was owned and licensed to Michael Parer and Smelters Hotel which was owned and licensed to Francis Parer who lived in the St Kilda Pier Pavilion in Melbourne for decades. Michael's younger brother John Parer owned The Empire Hotel until he sold it in April 1925 to Mr Thomas Cook who had been the licensee for the previous nine years.

The Parer's Michael, Francis and John were part of Parer Bros., which built and operated hotels, baths and cafes across Tasmania, King Island and Victoria including Parer's Crystal Cafe and Parer Bros on Bourke Street. Michael Parer, after his time in Queenstown, leased The Empire Hotel (originally The Rock) in Hobart then The Parer Hotel, shipped from Tasmania and erected in Currie on King Island. At one time it was his grand plan to operate Empire Hotels across Australia, the Queenstown one being the first.

Michael Parer's second son was Ray Parer. John Arthur Parer's youngest son was Damien Parer and his grandson is David Parer. William Higgins' great granddaughter is Missy Higgins.
