= Queen River, Tasmania =

River in Tasmania, Australia

Queen
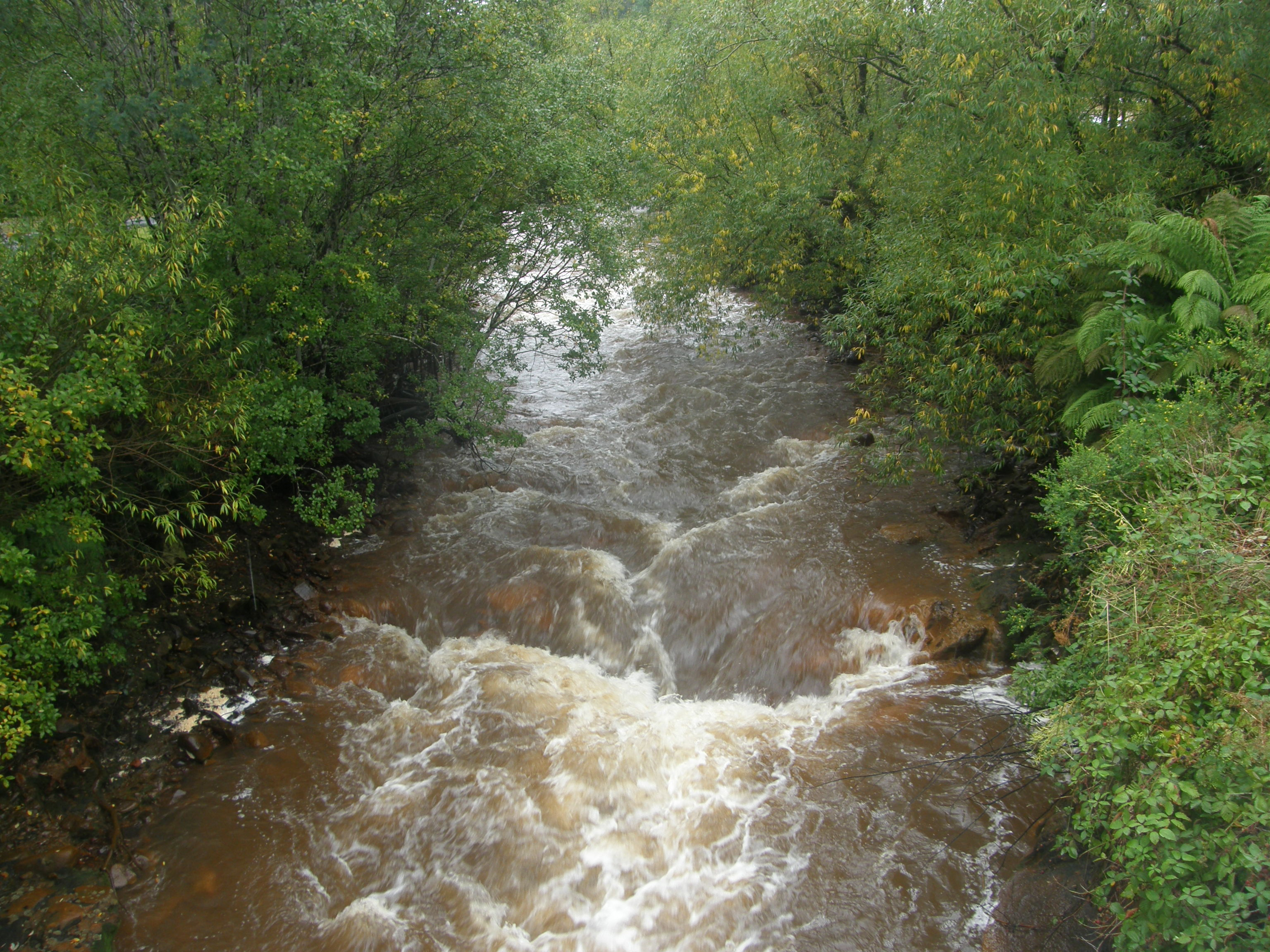

- Location of the Queen River mouth in Tasmania

Location
- Country: Australia
- State: Tasmania
- Region: West Coast
- City: Queenstown

Physical characteristics
- Source: Mount Lyell, West Coast Range
  - location: Gormanston
  - coordinates: 42°0′56″S 145°34′46″E
- Source confluence: West Queen River and East Queen River
  - location: Queenstown
  - coordinates: 42°3′47″S 145°33′30″E
  - elevation: 164 m (538 ft)
- Mouth: King River
  - coordinates: 42°09′23″S 145°31′42″E
  - elevation: 60 m (200 ft)
- Length: 13 km (8.1 mi)

The Queen River, part of the King River catchment, is a minor perennial river located in the West Coast region of Tasmania, Australia. It is notable for its high level of pollution caused by mining runoff which has led the river to be uninhabitable to life.

== Course and features ==
The Queen River rises below Gormanston, sourced by runoff from the West Coast Range and in particular the peaks of Mount Lyell and Mount Owen. The two branches of the river, West Queen River and East Queen River, merge north of Queenstown and flow through the city and continue south, joined by one minor tributary before reaching its confluence with the King River.

The river valley is low-lying and narrow, and the subsequent fogs are notable in their effect, some created by smelter fumes in earlier years.

In April 1906, a significant flooding occurred in Queenstown and the southern part of the town due to the river overflowing. Subsequent recorded floods include in 1922, 1937 and 1954.

== Tailings ==
For over 80 years, the Queen River was the main carrier of mining residue produced by the Mount Lyell Mining and Railway Company and the local sewage. It is estimated that 100 million tonnes (98,000,000 long tons) of tailings were disposed of into the Queen River. This in turn flowed into the lower part of the King River, and then into a delta at the mouth of the river where it met Macquarie Harbour. This 'acid mine drainage' is derived from water leaching through the exposed and oxidised sulfide rocks. When it was in operation, the fumes from the ore smelter produced acid rain which also leached minerals from the bare Queenstown hills.

Following the Mount Lyell Remediation and Research and Demonstration Program with the construction of tailings dams, and general reduction of waste into this river, the river flow is now rusty in colour rather than silvery grey as it was previously.

In 1992 the King River was dammed above the confluence with the Queen River to generate hydroelectric power at the Crotty Dam. This changed the flow regime in the King River, and affected the way tailings were transported through the river system. The tailings in the river greatly affect the water quality.

Since the closure of the mine in late 1995, and the construction of a tailings dam by the new operators, tailings no longer enter the river system. However, acid water continues to enter the river due to mine dewatering and run-off from the waste rock dumps. Without the buffering previously provided by the alkaline tailings, the acidity in the Queen and King rivers has increased, and dissolved metal concentrations have greatly increased-to levels completely inhospitable to life.

The river passes under and adjacent to the revitalised railway now known as the West Coast Wilderness Railway. South of Queenstown on the edge of the river is the early settlement of Lynchford where a gold mine and other mining activity supported a small community in the early days of the railway.

In October 2018, TasDance dancers performed in the river, as part of The Unconformity festival, to create awareness of the effects mining pollution has on river systems. The performance was entitled "Junjeiri Bullun, Gurul Gaureima" (which translates to "Shallow Water, Deep Stories") and depicted native animals moving through the water while also exploring local indigenous history.

== See also ==
- Rivers of Tasmania

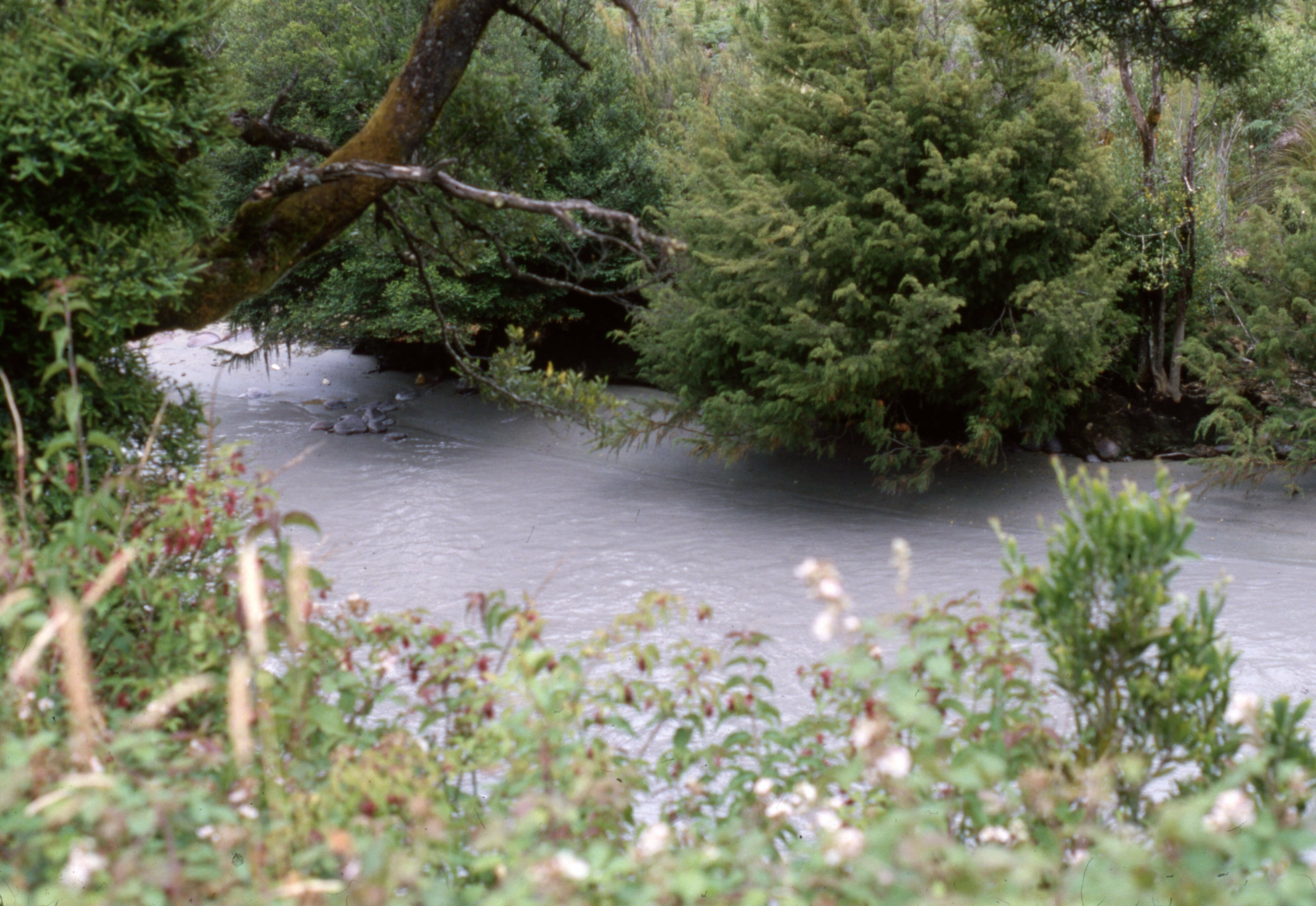
river in the 1970s
