= Dubbil Barril =

Railway stopping place in Western Tasmania, Australia

Coordinates: 42.1834°S 145.4823°E

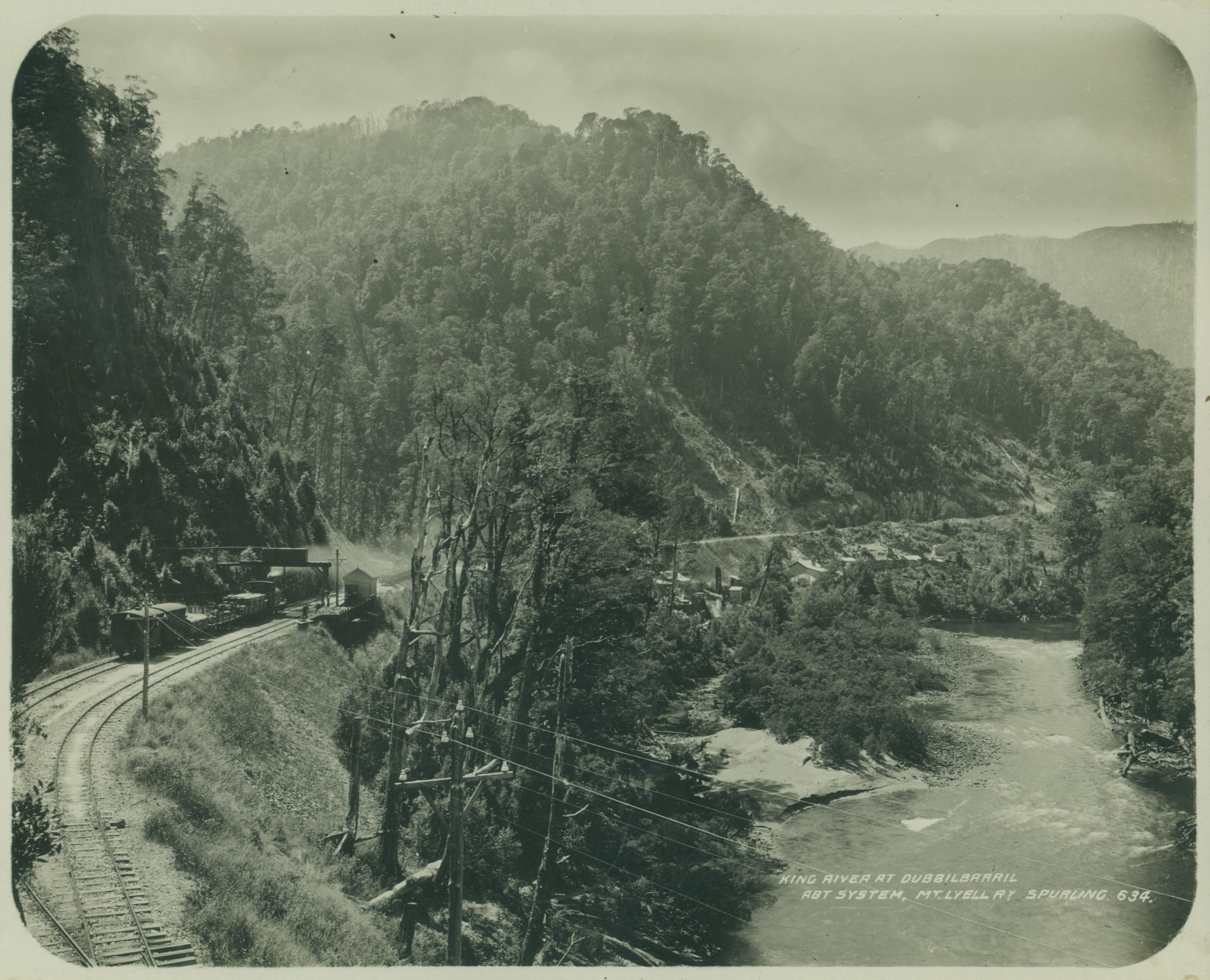
Dubbil Barril in the pre 1950 era, King River on right

Dubbil Barril is a stopping place and railway station on the northern bank of the King River and West Coast Wilderness Railway in Tasmania, Australia.

During the operating as the Mount Lyell railway line, the stopping place gave travellers opportunity to explore the area adjacent. The low level and proximity to the King River made the location on the line susceptible to flooding. Also bush fires affected the line.

Originally on the Mount Lyell railway line, which was removed in the 1960s, when the rebuilding of the railway line to make what would eventually become the West Coast Wilderness Railway, Dubbil Barril was considered to be the limit of the re-build.

It is the location of a turntable utilised by the current railway operations.
