= Queenstown railway station =

Railway station in Queenstown, Tasmania

Coordinates: 42.0795°S 145.5541°E

Queenstown
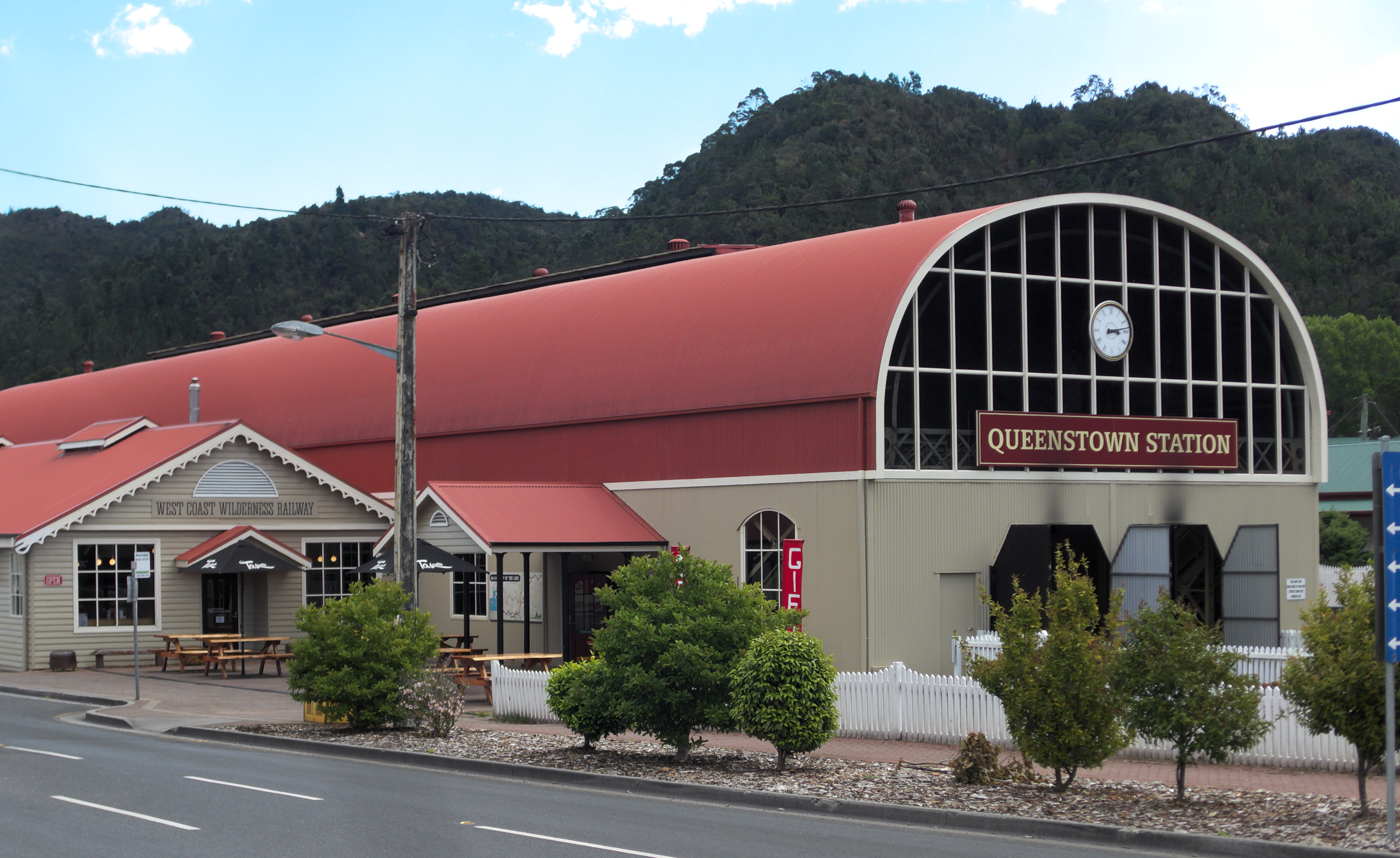
- View from Driffield Street in November 2017

General information
- Location: Driffield Street, Queenstown, Tasmania
- Line: West Coast Wilderness Railway
- Platforms: 2 side platforms
- Tracks: 2

History
- Opened: 4 November 2000; 25 years ago
Location

Queenstown railway station is a railway station in Queenstown, Tasmania, Australia.

== First station ==
The first station was built by the Mount Lyell Mining & Railway Company on the Mount Lyell railway line. In the 1920s, a roof was added. It closed in August 1963 when the line closed.

== Second station ==
As part of the reconstruction of the Mount Lyell railway line as the West Coast Wilderness Railway, a new station was built slightly south from the original opening in November 2000.
