= Queenstown Airport (Tasmania) =

Airport in Tasmania, Australia

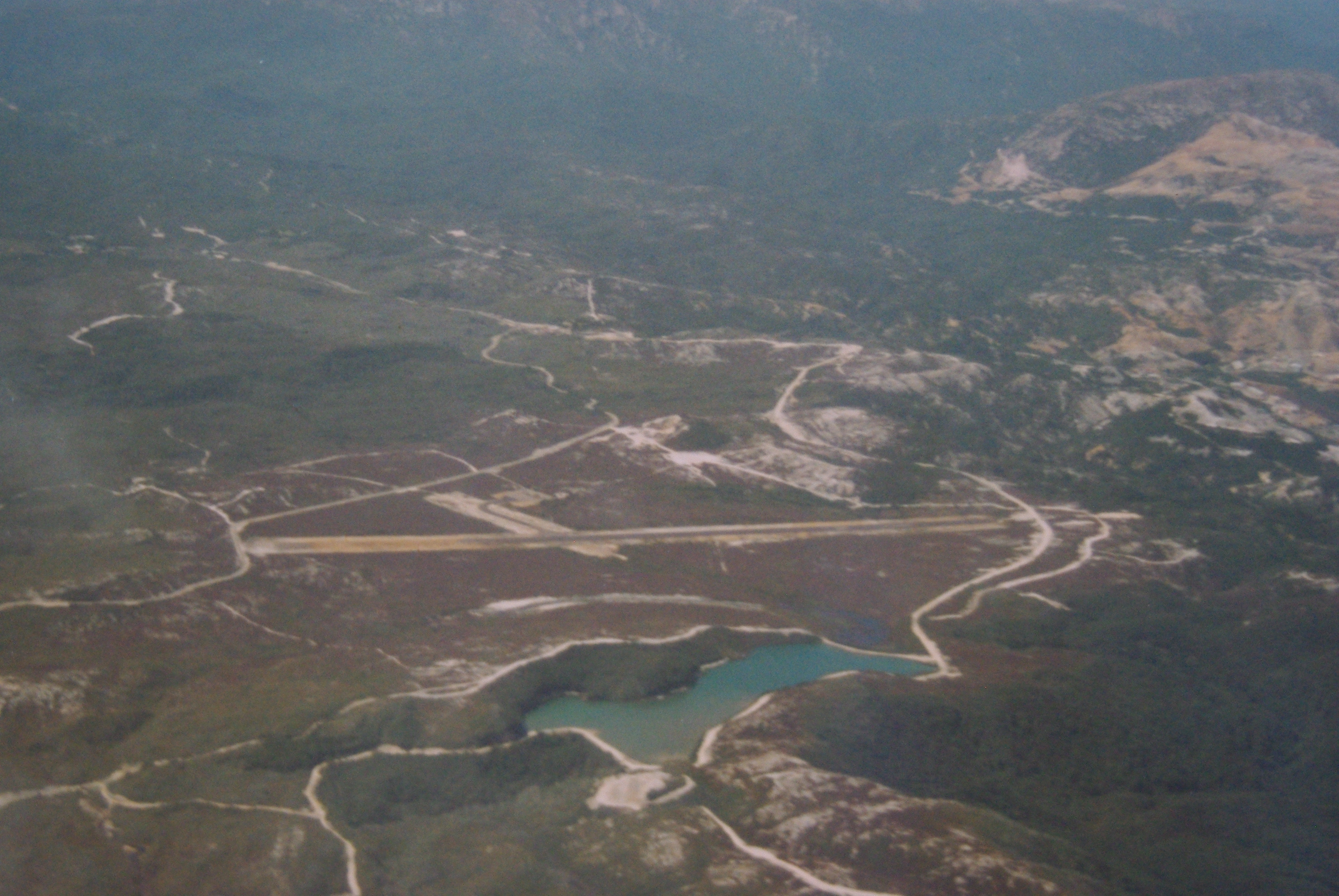
- Queenstown airport from the air in the 1970s
- IATA: UEE; ICAO: YQNS

Summary
- Airport type: Public
- Owner: West Coast Council
- Operator: West Coast Council
- Location: Queenstown, Tasmania
- Elevation AMSL: 867 ft / 264 m
- Coordinates: 42°04′32″S 145°31′48″E

Maps
- Location in Tasmania
- Interactive map of Queenstown Airport

Runways
Direction	Length		Surface
Direction	m	ft	Surface
09/27	1,220	4,003	Asphalt
- Sources: Australian AIP and aerodrome chart

Queenstown Airport (IATA: UEE, ICAO: YQNS) (also known as Howard's Plains aerodrome or Queenstown landing ground) is an aerodrome located at Howard's Plains west of Queenstown, Tasmania, Australia. Formerly a commercial airport, the aerodrome no longer receives regular passenger services, but is maintained by the West Coast Council for a variety of aviation and non-aviation related uses.

== History ==
Construction of an aerodrome to allow for air services to the West Coast was first proposed in the 1930s, however support was not unanimous amongst business and community leaders in Queenstown. Construction progressed through the later part of the decade assisted by Commonwealth grants. By 1937, a single runway had been constructed, however the frequently changing weather conditions of the area made operations from the field challenging. On 17 February that year an Australian National Airways aircraft carrying an inspector from the Department of Civil Aviation was involved in a minor accident when unfavourable winds forced the pilot to land in a soft, sandy area adjacent to the runway instead. In response to recommendations following the incident, additional grant funds were secured in 1938 for the construction of two more runways which would allow for safe landings regardless of the wind direction. By 1939 two runways were in use. The outbreak of World War II prompted an announcement of further works to extend both, allowing larger aircraft to land in support of the region's role in providing materials for munitions manufacturing as part of the war effort.

=== Post war ===
The Tasmanian Government proposed a network of intra-state passenger air services in 1946, with Queenstown identified as one of the destinations that would be served. Some limited operations commenced, with the first commercial passenger claimed to have arrived on a flight from Smithton in 1946. A further proposal in 1949 would see cargo flights direct to the mainland and passengers to both Hobart and Launceston using a pair of Avro Ansons. However, despite a number of war-time upgrades having been completed, there remained ongoing safety concerns about the airport site for commercial operations. The Municipal Council was split over the proposal, with some suggesting that an alternative site at Strahan may be more suitable for passenger flights as the Queenstown aerodrome was surrounded by high terrain and subject to fog. Other councillors favoured rehabilitation of the existing facility. The decision was deferred to Commonwealth authorities in 1950.

Despite serious doubts about the unreliable weather conditions at the aerodrome leading the Department of Civil Aviation to decline a commercial license for the airport, a 1953 proposal by the council sought a conditional license to allow the aerodrome to be used for emergency medical transport. By 1963, the Queenstown Municipal Council had taken full ownership of the aerodrome and redevelopment work was underway on runway and terminal facilities at Queenstown under the Aerodrome Local Ownership Plan.

=== Operational era ===
From the 1970s, both Queenstown and Strahan Airports were in operation as certified airports with regular passenger services. If weather conditions were difficult at Queenstown, Strahan would be the alternative landing location. Airlines of Tasmania served the airport until at least 1993, with direct flights to Hobart as well as to Essendon Airport in Melbourne via Smithton.

== Current status ==
There are currently no regular passenger flights to Queenstown from other airports in Tasmania or interstate, although the airport remains available for public use with prior permission from the West Coast Council. As an unlicenced aircraft landing area, the facilities are not required to be maintained to the same standard as a certified airport. Pilots can land in daylight under visual flight rules at their own risk. The aerodrome is limited to aircraft under 5,700 kg (12,600 lb) maximum takeoff weight. Limited en-route Air traffic control services are provided from Melbourne, but pilots must co-ordinate arrivals and departures and separate themselves from other aircraft at low level using a Common Traffic Advisory Frequency. There is no fuel available at the airport.

The West Coast Council make the airport available for aviation uses including private and charter flights, tourism operators and emergency services. Additionally, the facility has been used for other commercial and community purposes such as driver training, motorsports, marketing and promotional video shoots and public events where these do not prevent its ongoing use as aircraft landing area. During 2018, council approved a proposal by a local helicopter operator to use the airport as a base for scenic flights.

Between 2023 and 2025, the airport was used as a filming location for ABC series Bay of Fires which is set on Tasmania’s West Coast.

== See also ==
- Strahan Airport
- List of airports in Tasmania
