= West Coast Wilderness Railway =

Heritage railway Tasmania, Australia

Coordinates: 42.153°S 145.496°E

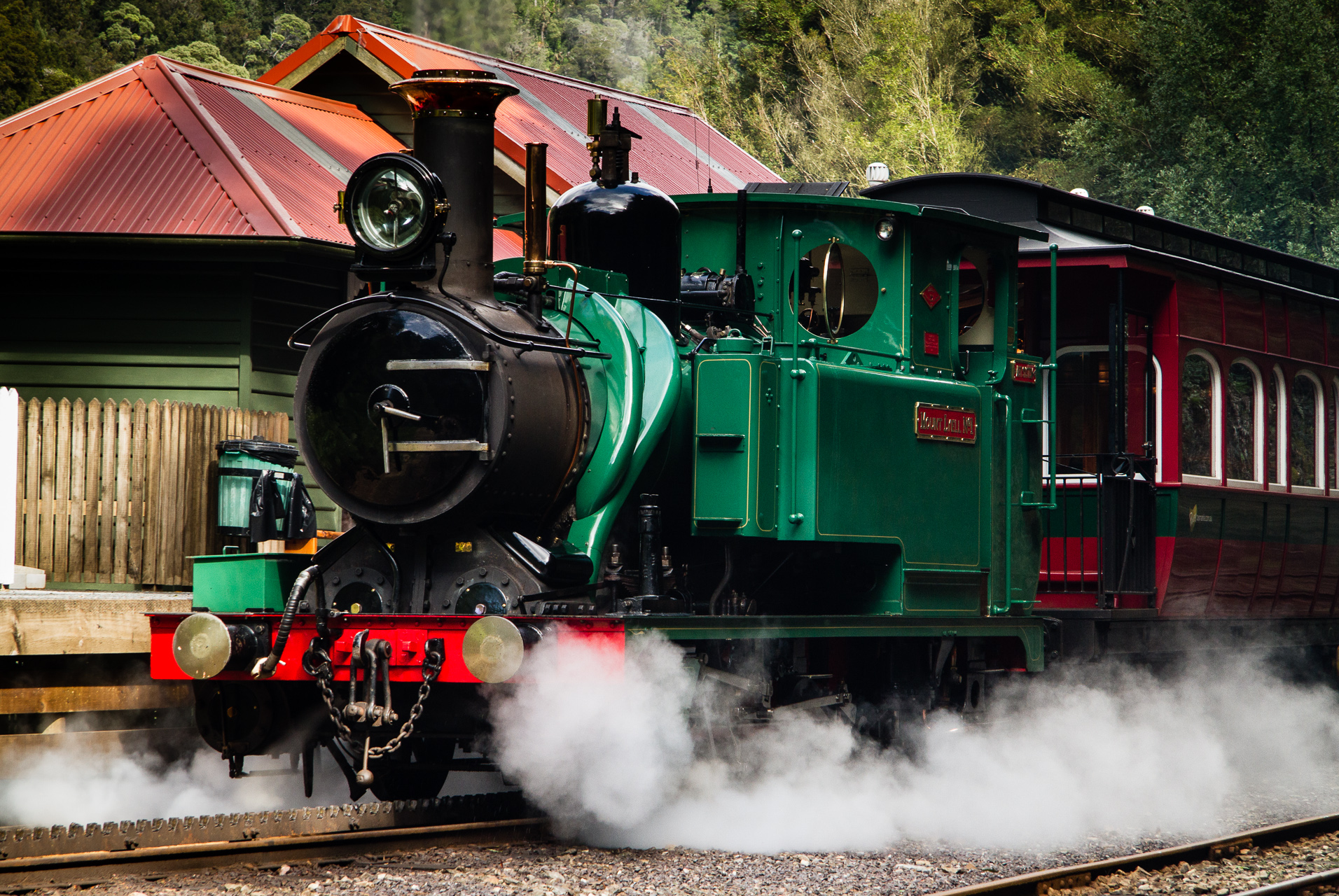
- No 1 in March 2013
- Locale: West Coast, Tasmania
- Terminus: Queenstown; Regatta Point

Commercial operations
- Original gauge: 3 ft 6 in (1,067 mm)
- Original rack system: Abt rack system

Preserved operations
- Owned by: Government of Tasmania
- Operated by: Abt Railway Ministerial Corporation
- Stations: Regatta Point; Teepookana; Dubbil Barril; Rinadeena; Lynchford; Queenstown
- Length: 34.5 kilometres
- Preserved gauge: 3 ft 6 in (1,067 mm)
- Preserved rack system: Abt rack system

Preservation history
- 4 November 2000: First stage opened
- 27 December 2002: Opened in full

Website
- www.wcwr.com.au

The West Coast Wilderness Railway is a 34.5 kilometre heritage railway line that runs from Queenstown to Regatta Point in Tasmania, Australia.

== History ==
=== Original operation ===
The first section of the Mount Lyell railway line opened between Queenstown and Teepookana. It was extended to Strahan on 1 November 1899.

The railway was built by the Mount Lyell Mining & Railway Company to carry copper from its mine in Queenstown. Until 1932, when a Hobart road link was completed, it was the only access through to Queenstown.

The railway utilised the Abt rack and pinion system for steep sections. Because of the gradients, tonnages were always limited on the railway. The gauge is 3 ft 6 in (1,067 mm).

The original line continued into the Mount Lyell mining operations area in Queenstown, and at Regatta Point the line linked around the foreshore of Strahan to link with the Tasmanian Government Railways' Zeehan to Strahan line.

At its peak in 1936, the company owned six locomotives, three railcars, eight coaches and 131 goods wagons.

The last passenger service ran on 29 June 1963, with the railway closed on 10 August 1963 due to increasing maintenance costs and the improvement of road access to the West Coast from the north with the opening of the Murchison Highway.

With the removal of the track the formation from Regatta Point was used by road vehicles for access to Lette's Bay and Lowana to the east.

Most bridges remained intact but fell into disrepair, and the route was unsuitable for vehicle access beyond the Iron Bridge that crosses the King River at the location of the early port of Teepookana.

=== Reconstruction ===
Despite various proposals post 1963, it was not until the 1990s after the demise of the main Mount Lyell Company mining operations, and the downgrading of Hydro Tasmania's activities of dam building on the West Coast, that some local West Coast people campaigned for the restoration of the Abt Railway as a heritage tourist attraction featuring the unique rail system and the community's mining history.

The restoration of the Abt Railway was made possible through the allocation of $20 million from the Federal Government, with further funding from the State Government and some private investment. Sinclair Knight Merz managed the project with Hazell Bros the main contractor.

=== New railway ===
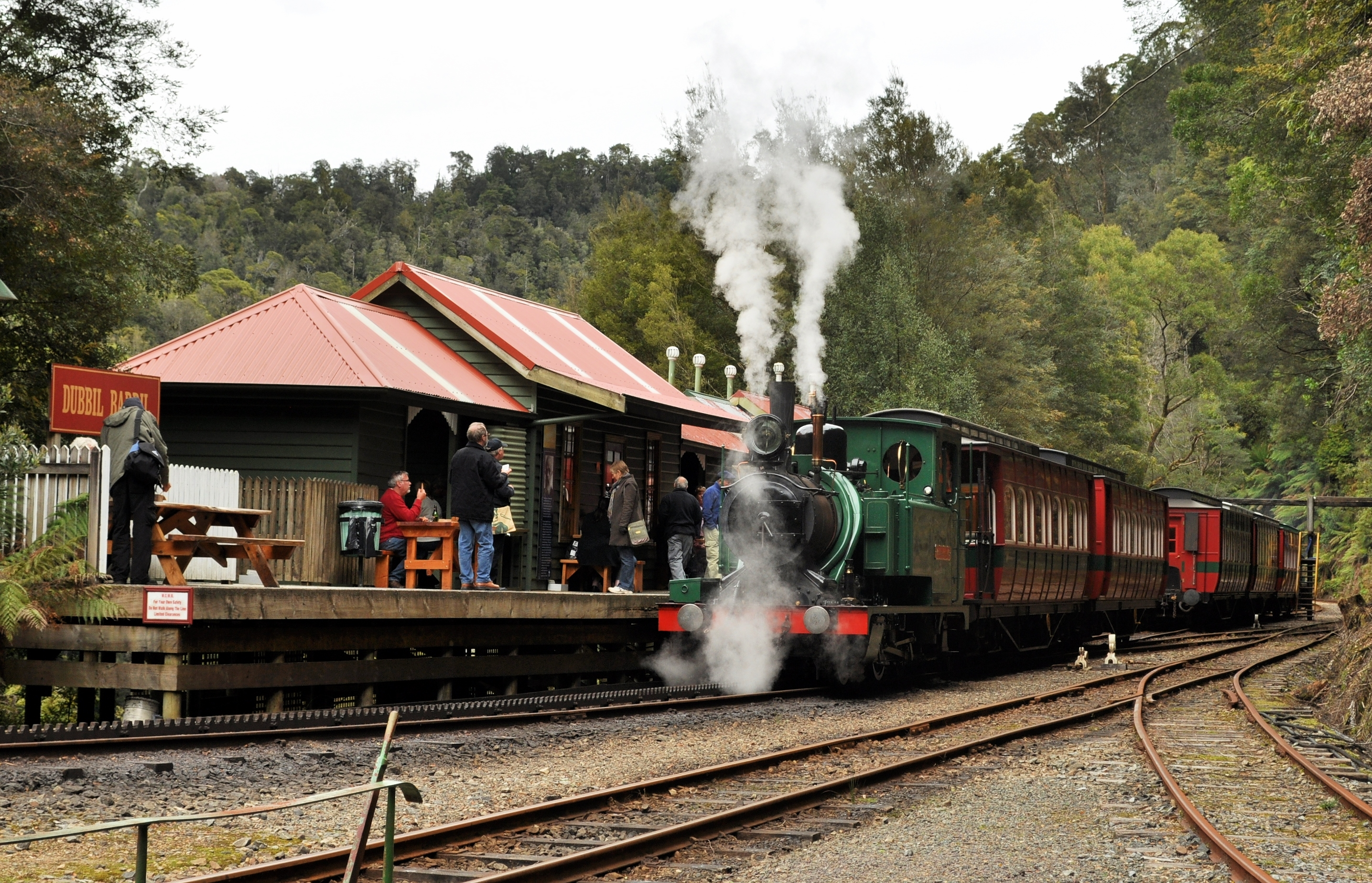
No 3 at Dubbil Barril in October 2011

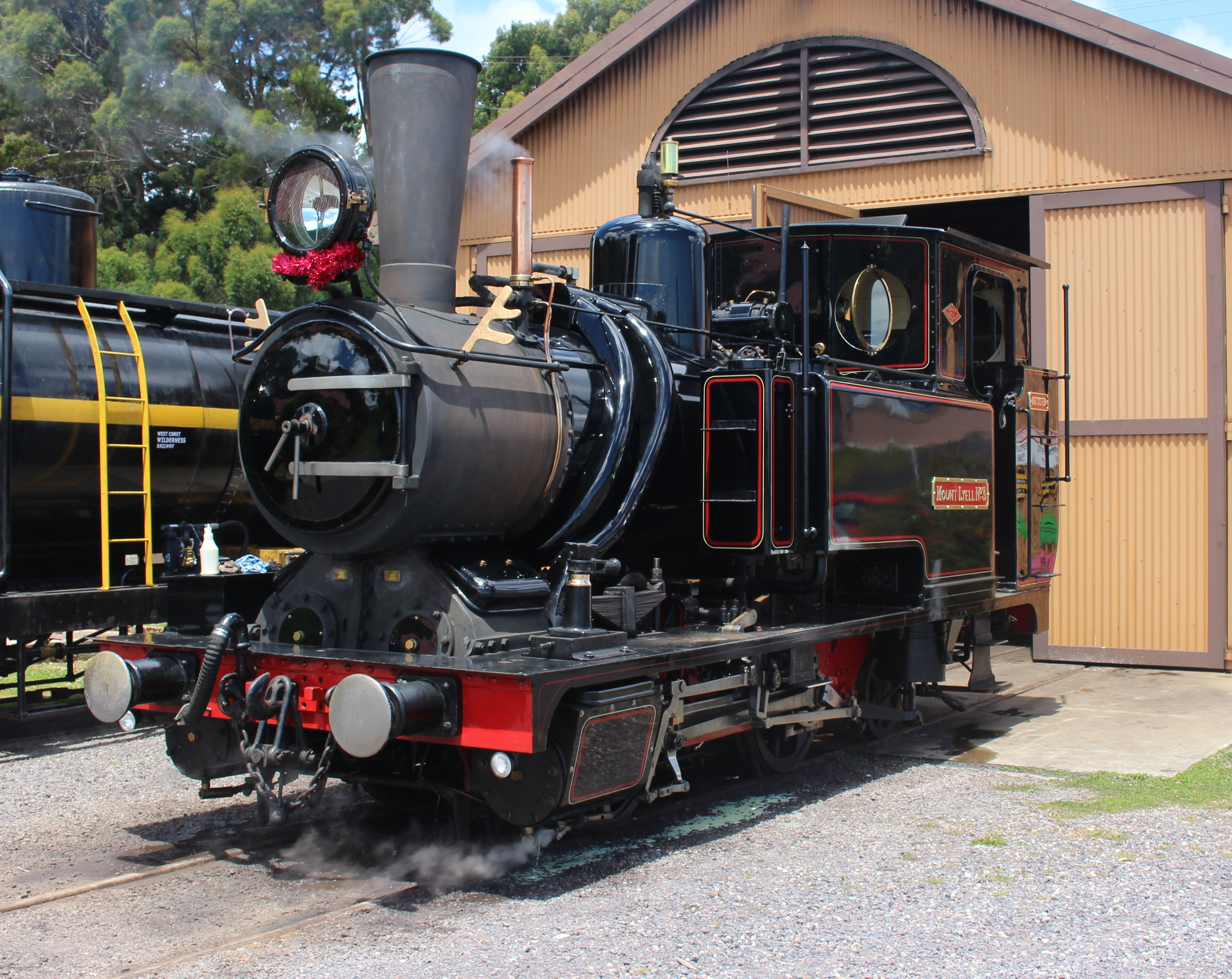
No 3 in December 2014

The first 5.5 kilometre section between Queenstown and Lynchford opened on 4 November 2000. It was opened in full on 27 December 2002. It was officially opened by Prime Minister John Howard and State Premier Jim Bacon on 3 April 2003.

The new terminus in Queenstown is on the site of the original station yard. The station at Regatta Point terminus has been renovated.

The railway follows its original alignment except for the Quarter Mile Bridge near Teepookana. The old bridge was washed away in a flood in 1974, with the new bridge just south of the original.

=== Change in operations ===
In February 2013 the Federal Group announced that it would be terminating its lease of the railway in April 2013, citing a downturn in business and a need for investment in infrastructure had made the railway no longer viable. The Tasmanian government responded by estimating that maintaining the railway would cost $15 to $20 million, and that the government alone could not fund it.

Following track rehabilitation work, the railway re-opened between Queenstown and Dubbil Barril on 6 January 2014. It resumed operation along its full length on 14 December 2014. It is operated by the Abt Railway Ministerial Corporation, a Government of Tasmania corporation.

== Rolling stock ==
=== Locomotives ===
For the commencement of operations, three of the five former Mount Lyell Mining & Railway Company locomotives were purchased. A fourth was purchased from the Tasmanian Transport Museum in 2019. The only former Mount Lyell locomotive not preserved was scrapped in the 1960s.

Two former Mount Lyell Mining & Railway Company Drewry Car Company diesel locomotives that had seen further service with the Emu Bay Railway and Tasmanian Government Railways were purchased.

Number	Manufacturer	Works number	Year	Notes
1	Dübs & Company	3369	1886	
2	Dübs & Company	3594	1898	purchased from Tasmanian Transport Museum in 2019
3	Dübs & Company	3770	1898	
5	North British Locomotive Company	24418	1938	acquired from Puffing Billy Railway
D1	Drewry Car Company	D193	1953	ex Emu Bay Railway 22
D2	Drewry Car Company	D194	1953	ex Tasmanian Government Railways V13

=== Carriages ===
Twelve frames for carriages were built by Saunders & Ward, Kingston with 10 fitted with carriage bodies as at January 2006.

== Engineering heritage award ==
The railway received an Engineering Heritage International Marker from Engineers Australia as part of its Engineering Heritage Recognition Program.
