= Mount Lyell railway line =

Name of railway operating 1899 to 1963 in Tasmania, Australia

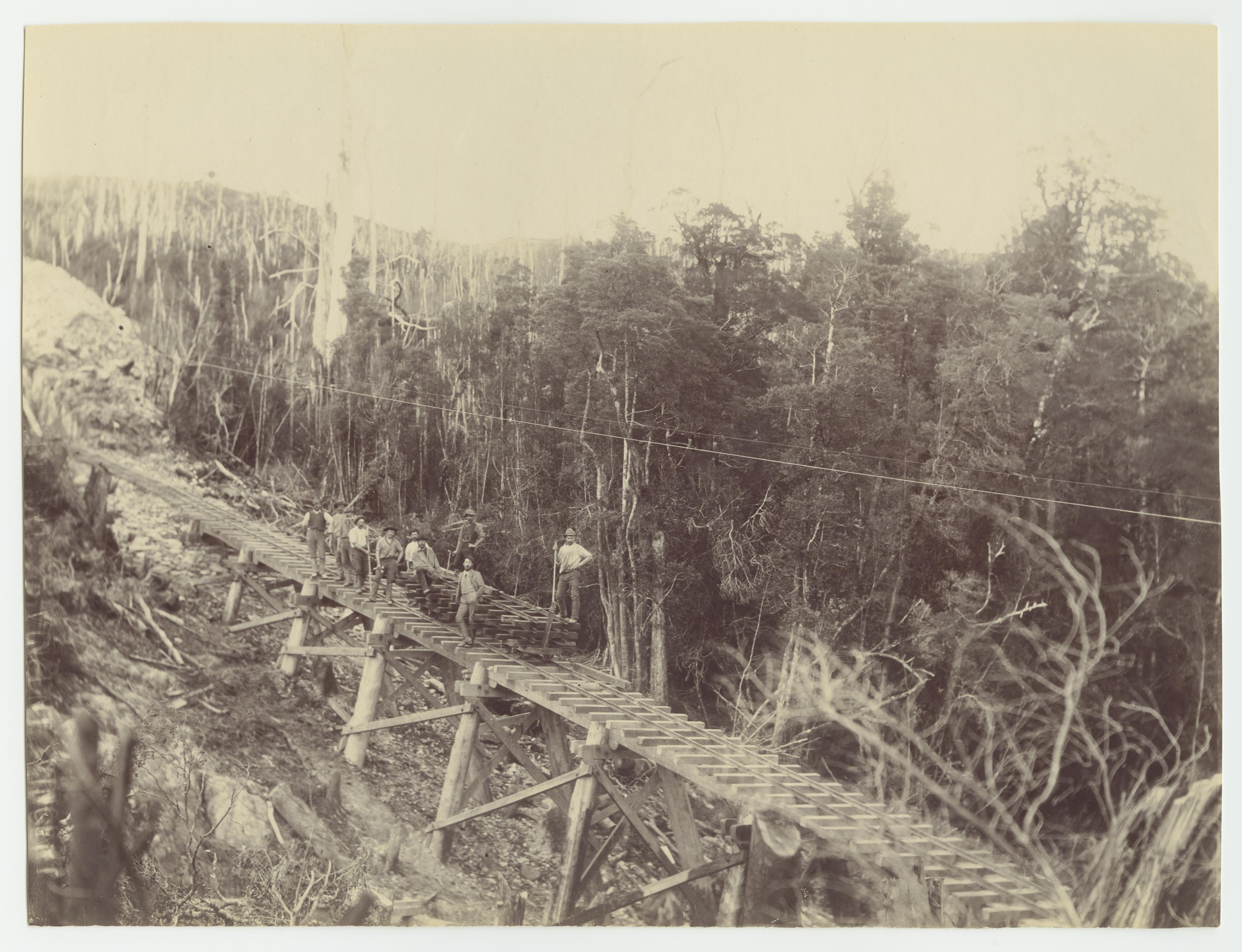
Construction of the Mount Lyell mine haulage line, c. 1895

The Mount Lyell railway line was a railway operated by the Mount Lyell Mining & Railway Company between 1899 and 1963.

Many name variations were used for identifying the line, the most common being the Abt railway. After closing of the railway, most of the railway infrastructure was removed, except for a few buildings and bridges.

== History ==
Surveying for the railway line began in 1892. A bill for construction of the railway was introduced into the Tasmanian House of Assembly in November 1892. A further survey was undertaken in March 1893 to determine the best route and in June the same year preparations were made to float the Mount Lyell Mining and Railway Company to undertake the work.

== Services ==
The line was primarily the only transport service out of Queenstown prior to roads being constructed. Passenger and freight services were consistent over the duration of the operation of the railway.

In the 1920s as typical passenger service was the daily mail train that left Queenstown at 8 am for 10 am arrival at Regatta Point. The return trip being 4.30 pm from Regatta Point to 6.30 pm arrival in Queenstown.

== Mine lease railways ==
Mount Lyell company had railways on its lease that were separate from the mainline between Queenstown and Strahan. The company constructed a haulage line to the mining operations on the ridge between Mount Owen and Mount Lyell in the early decades of operations.

The company had small gauge lines to move materials on the lease.

In later stages of operations, the mine had an underground railway to haul ore to the processing facilities on the lease.

== 2000s ==
The reconstructed railway runs over most of the original formation with some variations:

2002 operated under the name of the Abt Wilderness Railway.

2013 Federal Hotels withdrew from operations

2014 reopened as the West Coast Wilderness Railway
