= Lennon Wells =

Australian indie rock band

- Origin: Hobart, Tasmania
- Genres: Indie rock
- Years active: 2020–present
- Members: Ben Wells; Matt Doyle; Sam Forsyth; Dave Lee; Scott Target
- Website: lennonwells.com

Lennon Wells are an Australian Indie rock group from Hobart, Tasmania. The group's name is lead singer Ben's middle and surname.

In November 2025, they released their debut album Blink (And You'll Miss It) which debuted at number 45 on the ARIA Charts.

== Career ==
=== 2020-2024: Career beginnings and early EPs ===
The group formed during the COVID-19 lockdowns in 2020 and released their debut single "Slowly Dying" in March 2021.

In December 2021, the group released their debut EP, Beast On My Back. Upon release, lead singer Ben Wells said "The songs all have to do with dealing with everything inside my head. Doubt, depression, anxiety. Opening a small business put a lot of pressure on all aspects of my life the EP was really acknowledging that and celebrating the fact that I'd made it through."

=== 2025: Blink (And You'll Miss It) ===
In October 2025, the group announced the release of debut studio album Blink (And You'll Miss It). The album was released on 21 November 2025 and debuted at number 45 on the ARIA Charts.

== Band members ==
- Ben Wells - Vocals and Guitar
- Matt Doyle - Guitar
- Sam Forsyth - Drums and Percussion
- Dave Lee - Bass and Vocals
- Scott Target - Keys and Harmonica

== Discography ==
=== Studio albums ===
List of studio albums, with selected details and peak chart positions
Title	Details	Peak chart positions
Title	Details	AUS
Blink (And You'll Miss It)	Released: 21 November 2025; Format: CD, LP, digital download, Label: Lennon Wells (SLW001V)	45

=== Extended plays ===
List of EPs, with selected details and peak chart positions
Title	Details	Peak chart positions
Title	Details	AUS
Beast On My Back	Released: 3 December 2021; Format: digital; Label: Lennon Wells	—
