= York Park =

Stadium in Launceston, Tasmania

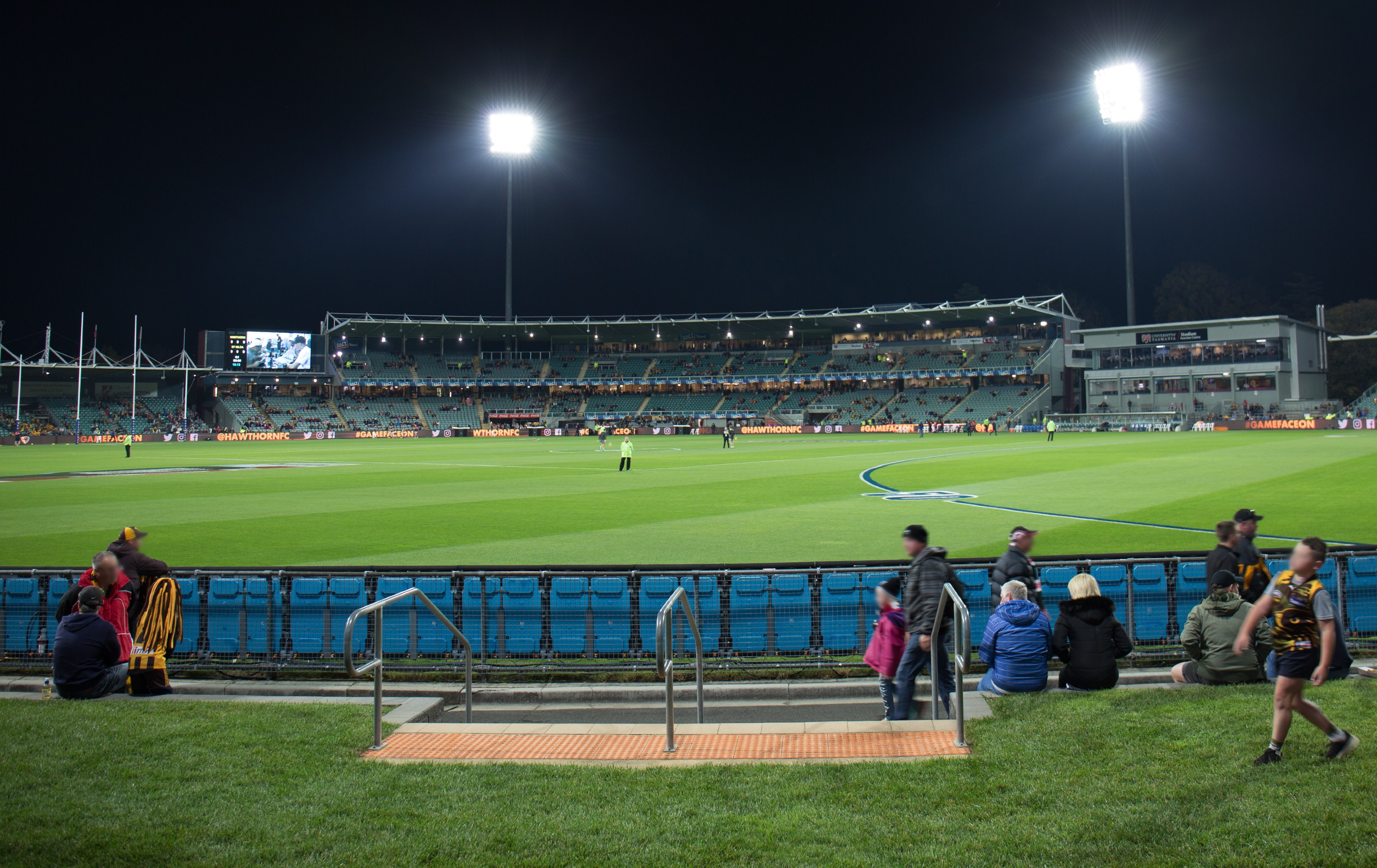
- York Park hosting a night match between Hawthorn and St Kilda in 2018
- Interactive map of York Park
- Former names: Aurora Stadium (2004–2016)
- Location: Launceston, Tasmania, Australia
- Coordinates: 41°25′33″S 147°08′20″E
- Owner: Launceston City Council
- Operator: AFL Tasmania
- Capacity: 15,615 (13,106 seated)
- Field size: 170 m × 140 m (560 ft × 460 ft)

Construction
- Groundbreaking: 1919; 107 years ago
- Opened: 1921; 105 years ago
- Cost: A$23.6M (redevelopment)

Tenants
- Australian rules football Tasmania Football Club (AFL/AFLW/VFL/VFLW) (2026–present); Hawthorn Football Club (AFL) (2001–present); North Melbourne Football Club (AFLW) (2019–present); St Kilda Football Club (AFL) (2003–2006); Tasmania Devils (VFL) (2001–2008); Tassie Mariners (TAC Cup) (1996–2016); Tasmania Devils Academy (Talent League) (2019–present); North Launceston Football Club (NTFL/TSL) (1923–present); Western Storm Football Club (TSL) (2014–2015) Cricket Hobart Hurricanes (WBBL) (2015–2023, 2026–present); Hobart Hurricanes (BBL) (2017–2023, 2026–present); Tasmania cricket team (One-Day Cup) (2022–present) Soccer Melbourne Victory FC (A-League Men) (2012–2013); Western United FC (A-League Men) (2021–2023); Perth Glory FC (A-League Men) (2022); Perth Glory FC (A-League Women) (2022); Melbourne Knights FC (NSL) (2002) Other Tenants (2003 Rugby World Cup)

York Park (known under naming rights as University of Tasmania Stadium or UTAS Stadium) is an oval-shaped stadium located in the Inveresk and York Park Precinct in Launceston, Tasmania, Australia. The stadium is primarily used for Australian rules football: it hosts regular matches in the Australian Football League (AFL) and is the home ground of the North Launceston Football Club in the Tasmanian State League (TSL). It will also be the secondary home ground of the Tasmania Football Club upon their admission into the AFL in 2028.

The area was swampland before becoming Launceston's showgrounds in 1873. In the following decades the grounds were increasingly used for other sports, including cricket, bowls and tennis. In 1919, plans were prepared for the transformation of the area into a multi-sports venue. From 1923, the venue was principally used for Australian rules football by the Northern Tasmanian Football Association, becoming the ground of the North Launceston Football Club. The ground also hosted occasional inter-state football matches. Visiting mainland football clubs regularly played mid-season or end-of-season matches at the ground.

As part of a long-term agreement with the Tasmanian Government, the Hawthorn Football Club have played between two and five home AFL matches each season since 2001. Previously the St Kilda Football Club played two home games a year at the ground between 2003 and 2006. The venue hosted its first AFL finals match during the 2021 AFL finals series. York Park will become a home ground to the Tasmania Football Club upon the club's entry into the AFL in 2028.

As well as football, York Park has hosted other sports and several concerts and other entertainment events. The venue was redeveloped in 2005 at a cost of $23.6 million, and as of 2025 is currently undergoing a $130 million redevelopment to accommodate four home games per season for the Tasmania Football Club, who will enter the AFL in 2028.

York Park has been home to the Tasmanian Football Hall of Fame since 2009.

== History ==
The area now known as York Park was originally "swampy, sour, and choked with weeds". After European settlement, it was used for landfill before becoming the Launceston showgrounds in 1874. By 1881, 47 acres (0.19 km^{2}) of land (now York and Invermay Parks) had been taken over by the Launceston City Council "for the purpose of recreation, health and enjoyment". The area was ready to be used for two cricket games by the end of 1886. Cricketers were full of praise for the ground, but because winter rain caused it to become waterlogged, footballers (Australian rules) were often unable to use the facility.

At a council meeting in July 1901, one member, Alderman Storrer, proposed that Inveresk Park be renamed York Park in honour of the Duke of York (later King George V), who visited Tasmania during the Federation celebrations of 1901. The proposal was passed 4–2, although another member, Alderman Sadler, noted that "Launceston was well known as a loyal community and did not need to change the park's name" to prove their fidelity to the monarchy. A bowling green and tennis courts were completed by 1910, along with the main oval which was used for state school sports. In 1919, the council held a competition for the design of the York Park sports ground, the winner to receive £20. The final design had to include two full sized tennis courts, a bowling green, a cycling track, cricket and football grounds with dressing rooms and facilities for spectators. Although not fully complete, York Park was officially opened by the St Andrews Caledonian Society on 1 January 1921. A cycling track surrounding the perimeter fence was in use by September of the same year. On 4 May 1923 The Examiner reported on that "Work on the grandstand was completed for the opening of the 1923 football season, when the game was transferred from the NTCA Ground to York Park. Work on the grandstand and the seating round the oval has been proceeded with at top speed, and spectators at the game tomorrow should have little to complain of." The first game between teams representing the northern and southern halves of Tasmania took place at the oval in August 1923 in front of a crowd of 9,441. A reporter from The Examiner commented: "The oval is in good order and well grassed and the new motor mower copes with the latter very effectively under favourable conditions. The whole five acres can be cut in six hours, as compared with twenty hours by the horse mower." When the ground was harrowed, glass and other debris would surface; a contemporary observer, John Orchard, later remembered: "they'd line up a whole group of people, perhaps thirty or forty players, and we'd go along with a container alongside each other and we'd pick up everything that was likely to hurt a player."

Heavy floods in 1929 caused substantial damage to the ground, destroying the cycling track, which was subsequently rebuilt. In the 1930s the Launceston Football Club, who played regularly at the ground, won six consecutive premierships before World War II intervened. As a consequence of the war NTFA matches were cancelled after the 1941 season, not to resume until May 1945. Three years later, 12 ornamental trees were planted at the ground, in memory of NTFA players who had lost their lives in the war.

In 1960, York Park was the venue of a football match in which Tasmania defeated Victoria for the first time. The match was attended by a record crowd of approximately 15,000. Four years later, the southern stand (demolished in 2004) was completed. In the 1970s another stand was added, capable of holding 650 spectators and incorporating sales kiosks and committee rooms.

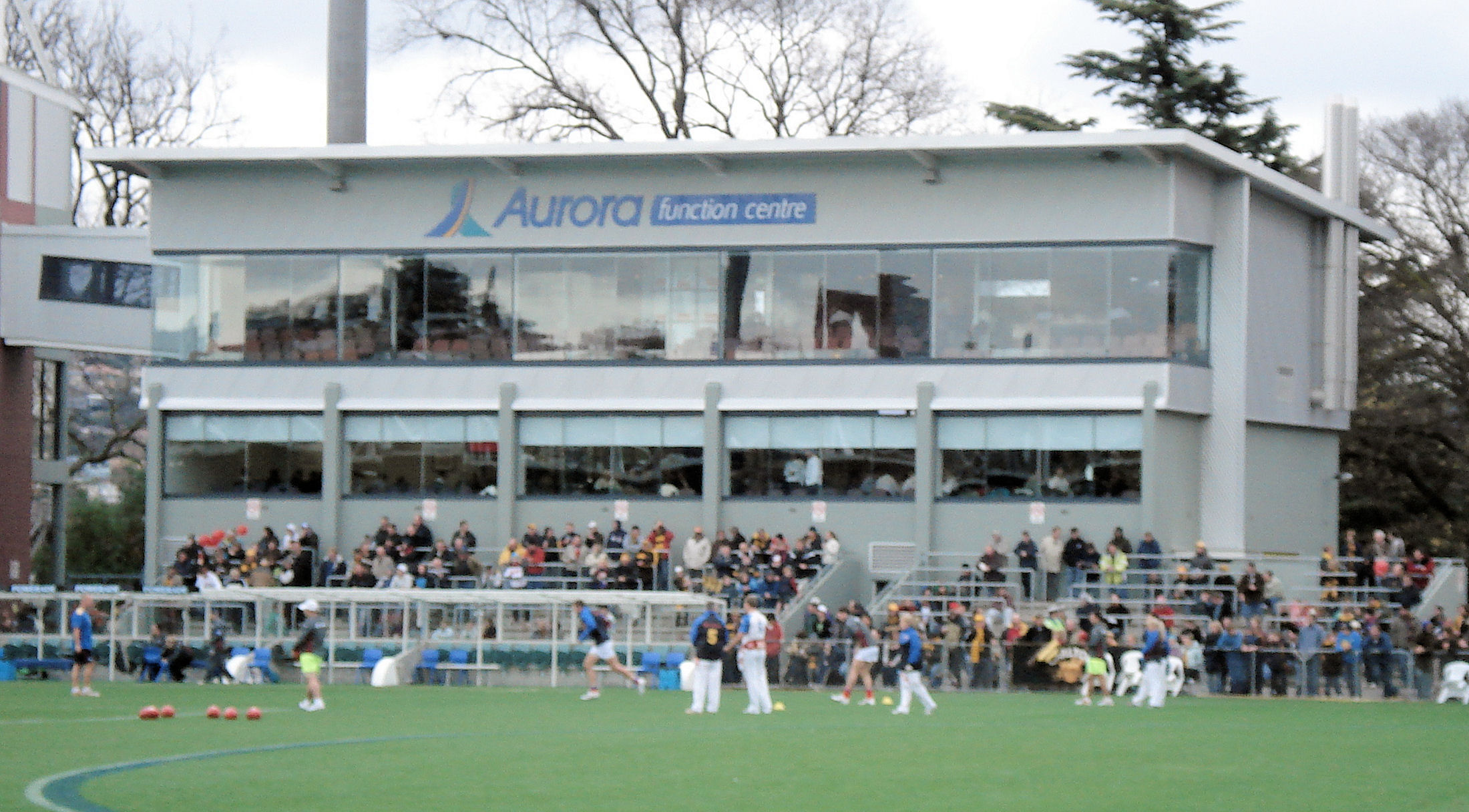
Aurora Function Centre

Up to 1999 York Park had remained a sports ground used predominately for local events, generally attracting modest crowds; according to ground manager Robert Groenewegen, supporters were able to "park [their] car[s] next to the boundary fence". However, before the 1998 federal election the local member of parliament (MP) representing the Division of Bass, Warwick Smith—a minister from the ruling Liberal Party—promised public funding for the redevelopment of York Park. Although Smith lost his seat, the Liberals retained power and kept the promise. The $6.4 million redevelopment completed in 2000 was the first major phase in the process of raising the ground to Australian Football League (AFL) standard. Work included the construction of the Gunns Stand, a two-level grandstand originally holding 2,500 (now extended to 5,700) which incorporates corporate facilities. Other improvements added were five 45 m (148 ft) television standard light towers, a watering and drainage system able to disperse up to 100 millimetres (3.9 in) of rain an hour, and 85 in-ground sprinklers capable of rising 15 centimeters (5.9 in).

In 2003, the Government of Tasmania allocated $2 million to erect a roof above 6,000 terrace seats, in readiness for the 2003 Rugby Union World Cup; this meant that almost all of the seating area was protected from the weather. In 2004, the ground became known as Aurora Stadium as the result of six-year naming rights sponsorship deal with Aurora Energy. During 2006, the state government supplied $150,000 for new gates and ticket boxes at the stadium entry. The gates were later named after recently deceased Tasmanian Premier Jim Bacon. These gates, and the heritage-listed Northern Stand, have been placed on the Tasmanian Heritage Register as culturally significant to the state.

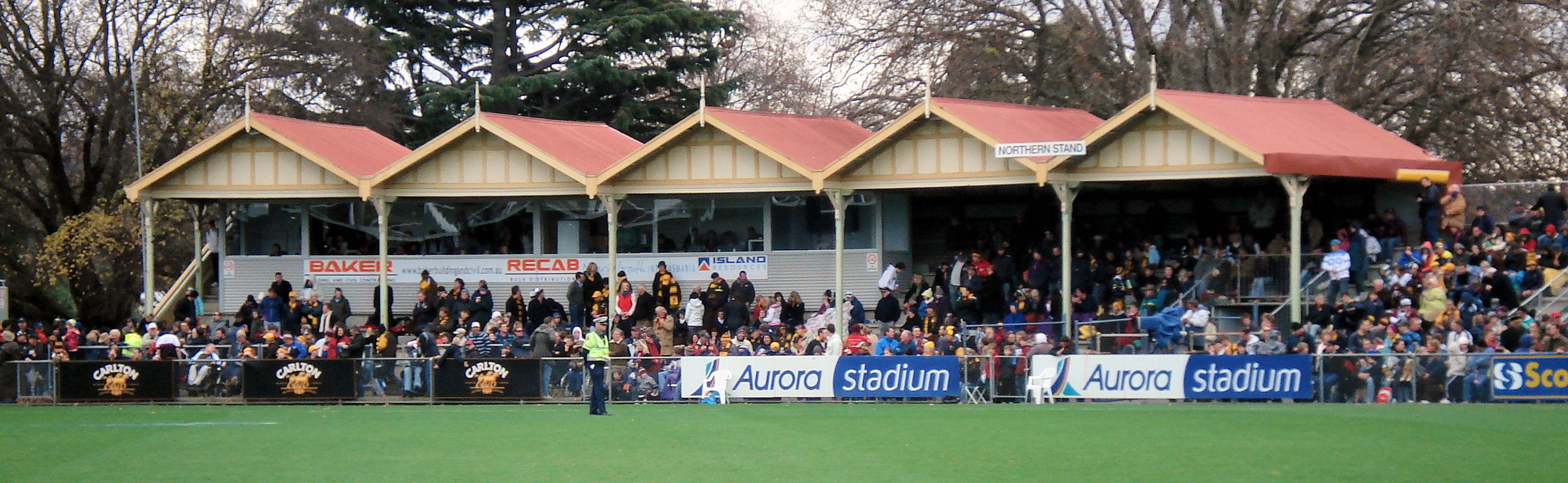
Northern Stand after fire damage in 2008. The stand was consequently moved to the nearby Invermay Park in 2010.

In March 2008, an arson attack destroyed part of the Northern Stand, causing between $300,000 and $500,000 damage. In December 2008 the Launceston City Council proposed a $7 million development for a replacement Northern Stand. The project includes the relocation of the old Northern Stand's heritage roof into part of the redevelopment of facilities at Invermay Park. The old structure at York Park will be replaced with a 2,125-seat grandstand which will include three AFL compliant changerooms, an AFL umpire changeroom, a corporate facility for 936 people in corporate boxes, suites and function rooms, coaches boxes, along with statistician, timekeepers and print media rooms. Post-match press conference, drug testing, and radio rooms will also be included. The stand has increased the ground's capacity to 21,000 and the seating capacity to 13,825. These works were designed by Tasmania-based architects Philp Lighton Architects. The Australian Government was expected to contribute $4 million, the Tasmanian Government $2 million and Launceston City Council $500,000. The Hawthorn Football Club asked for a "sizeable" contribution from the AFL towards the development, and Inveresk Precinct Authority chairman Robin McKendrick has indicated that a contribution of $1 million was possible.

== Redevelopment ==
As the Tasmanian Government sought to secure a license for a Tasmanian team in the Australian Football League (AFL), redeveloping York Park became an active pursuit of the government.

In March 2022, Tasmanian Premier Peter Gutwein announced the government intended to pursue a significant redevelopment of the stadium, stating a redevelopment could occur within five years, though making it contingent on the state government's $65 million contribution being matched by the federal government, as well as ownership of the stadium being transferred from the Launceston City Council to the state government-run Stadiums Tasmania agency. The federal funding was secured in April 2023 in an announcement by Prime Minister Anthony Albanese. Shortly after this announcement, the Tasmania Football Club was approved for entry into the AFL for the 2028 season.

In November 2024, the Launceston City Council voted to transfer ownership of the stadium from the council to Stadiums Tasmania, paving the way for construction works on improved matchday facilities to commence and bringing umpires rooms, changing rooms and other facilities to Australian tier 2 sporting guidelines. Major construction at the stadium commenced in September 2025.

The redevelopment will include a new centre-west stand incorporating function, corporate and media facilities, a new seating bowl in the lower section of the western stand and a revitalised eastern stand. It is expected be complete in 2027, and will result in a total stadium capacity of 17,500.

== Sports and events ==
=== Australian rules football ===
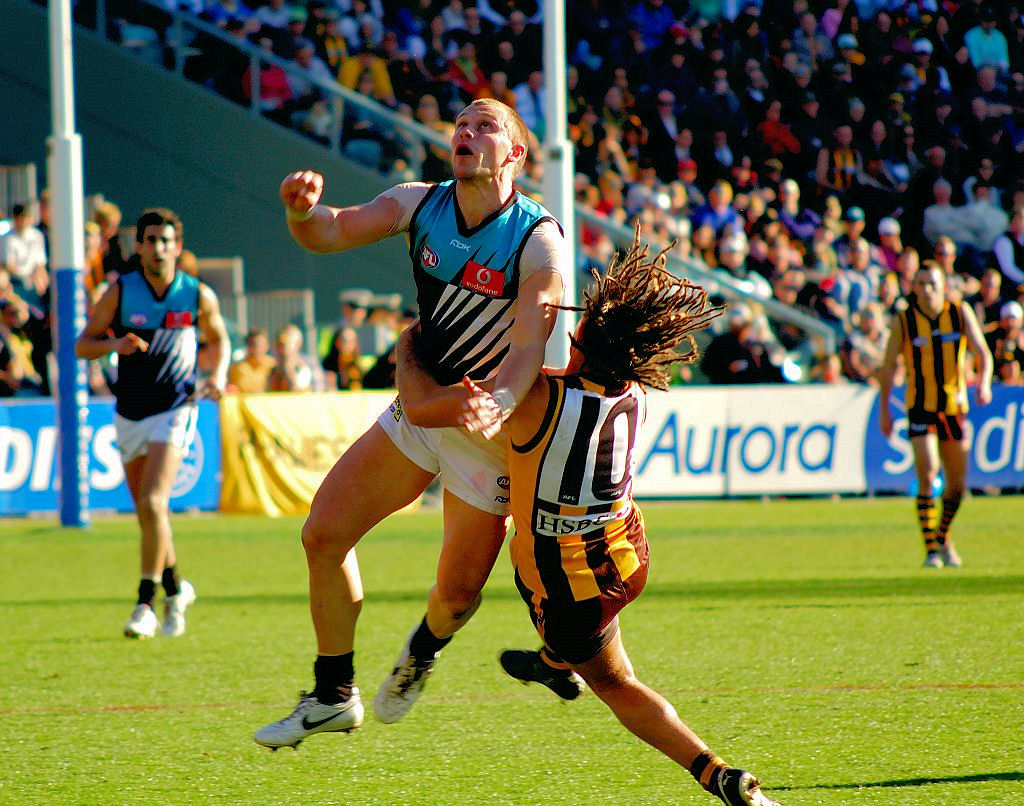
Hawthorn vs Port Adelaide AFL match in 2007

Australian rules football is the main sport played at the stadium which has hosted Australian Football League (AFL) games since 2001, when the state government started paying interstate clubs to relocate their home games. Melbourne-based Hawthorn played one game in 2001 and two in 2002, and in 2003 were joined by another Melbourne team, St Kilda. In 2004, it was estimated that the cost to the government per game was between $300,000 and $500,000, but Tasmanian Premier Jim Bacon stated that the government was making a profit on its investment, estimating that each game injected between $1 million and $1.5 million into the Tasmanian economy.

The number of AFL matches peaked in 2006, when Hawthorn played three home games and one pre-season game, while St Kilda played two home games. The games drew an average crowd of 17,108, with a record attendance of 20,971 for the match between Hawthorn and Richmond.

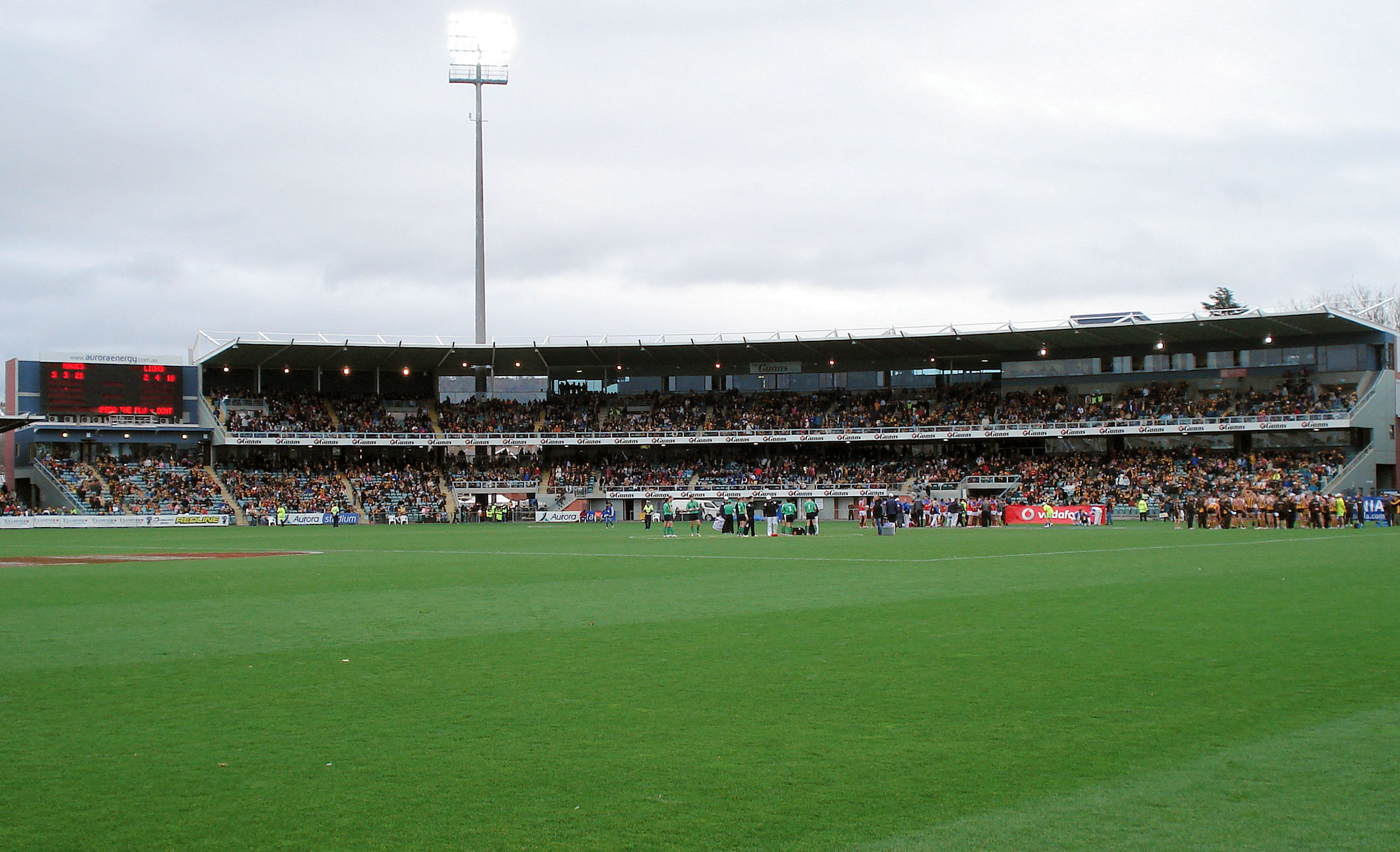
Gunns Stand during Hawthorn vs Brisbane AFL match in 2009

A major controversy occurred at York Park when, in the round 5, 2006 match between St Kilda and Fremantle, the final siren was too quiet to be heard by any of the umpires; play was restarted in error, and in the subsequent confusion St Kilda levelled the scores. After a protest, the AFL Commission convened and overturned the result, awarding Fremantle the victory. The stadium's sirens were replaced, and the old ones were put on display at the Queen Victoria Museum and Art Gallery.

In 2007 York Park benefitted from a five-year, $16.4 million sponsorship of Hawthorn by the state government. Under the sponsorship agreement the stadium is the venue for five of Hawthorn's matches each year—one pre-season and four premiership games. Hawthorn president Jeff Kennett has expressed interest in his club playing higher profile teams, such as Collingwood, at the stadium.

As well as being an AFL venue, York Park is the long-term base of North Launceston, and thus hosts regular Tasmanian State League matches. The ground also hosted occasional Tasmanian Devils Football Club home games in the Victorian Football League, from 2001 until the club's demise in 2008.

In 2021, due to COVID-19 restrictions and lockdowns preventing matches from being played in Melbourne and Sydney, York Park hosted its first two AFL finals matches: both first-week elimination finals, the first a Western Bulldogs victory over Essendon, and the second a Greater Western Sydney Giants win over the Sydney Swans in Sydney Derby XXII.

==== Hawthorn Football Club ====
Hawthorn are the AFL club with the longest tenancy at York Park, having played up to four relocated home games per season at the venue since 2001, and having exclusivity over the ground since the mid-2000's. The club made repeated extensions of its partnership with the venue, culminating in agreement that will last to the end of the 2027 season. In 2026 the AFL ended Hawthorn's practice of playing home games at York Park beyond the expiration of the deal in 2027. As of the end of the 2024 season, Hawthorn have won 61 of the 82 premiership matches it has played at the venue, one of the league's most successful win-loss records.

==== Tasmania Football Club ====
As part of the AFL ending Hawthorn's tenancy at York Park in 2027, the league cited the need for the venue to become a home ground to the Tasmania Football Club (nicknamed the Devils), who enter the competition in 2028. The Devils will initially split home games between York Park and Bellerive Oval in Hobart, before shifting Hobart-based matches to the proposed Macquarie Point Stadium in 2031.

=== Other uses ===
York Park hosted its first international sporting fixture in the group phase of the 2003 Rugby Union World Cup, when Romania and Namibia played in front of 15,457 spectators. As a soccer venue the stadium has hosted one National Soccer League match and three A-League pre-season games. Melbourne Knights and Perth Glory played a national league match at the stadium during the 2001–02 NSL season. In July 2006, after the A-League replaced the NSL, the stadium hosted Tasmania's first A-League match when Melbourne Victory and Adelaide United played in the pre-season competition. In 2007, 8,061 attended the corresponding match, which has since become a regular fixture. In addition to pre-season matches, Aurora Stadium has also hosted regular season A-League matches: on 1 February 2012, Melbourne Victory played Gold Coast United FC in a regular season A-League game in front of a crowd of 5,268 people and on 12 January 2013, Melbourne Victory played against Central Coast Mariners in front of a crowd of 6,238 people. Inveresk Precinct Authority chairman Robin McKendrick has stated that ground authorities are attempting to win hosting rights for Australian national soccer team matches. On 30 December 2017, the ground played host to its first ever Big Bash League match when the Hobart Hurricanes took a home game to York Park with the Sydney Thunder being their opponents. The Thunder won by 57 runs in front of 16,734 fans. Western United FC has also played home games at the stadium.

Among non-sporting events, before its redevelopment the stadium hosted an Ike & Tina Turner concert and a Billy Graham religious revival meeting. The Crusty Demons performed at the stadium during 2006 and March 2008. Elton John performed at York Park during his Rocket Man: Greatest Hits Live Tour at the end of 2007; this remains his only appearance in Tasmania as of August 2009.

== Structures and facilities ==
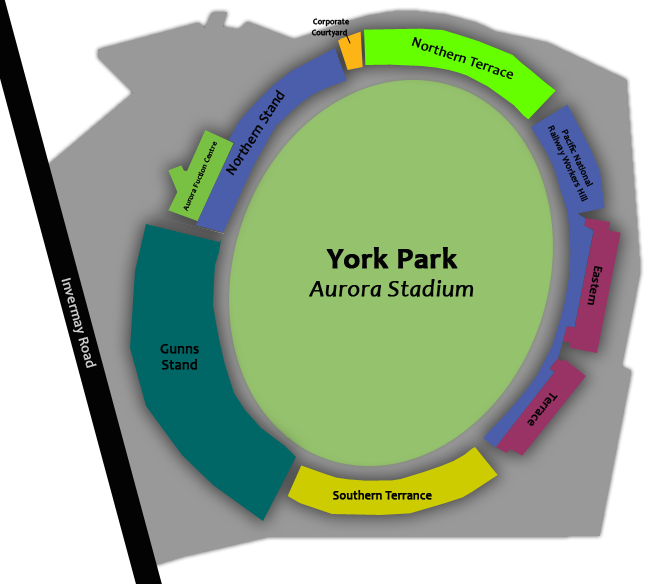
Stadium map

York Park is an oval-shaped grassed arena surrounded by several different stands, the largest being the two-tier Gunns Stand on the ground's western side. The stand originally had a capacity of 2,500, which was increased by an extension in 2005 to 5,700. The stand has two corporate box areas, the Gunns Function Centre and the Corporate Function Centre. Immediately north of the Stand is the Aurora Function Centre, which also houses coaches' boxes, and is next to the heritage listed Northern Stand connecting the Northern, Southern and Eastern Terraces. The stands have a collective capacity of 6,000, bringing the ground's total seating to 11,700. The Railway Workers Hill is a small, uncovered stand located at the eastern side of the ground between the Northern and Eastern Terraces. The ground has a parking capacity of approximately 2,500, from the use of large grassy areas at the adjacent Inveresk site, with an option of street parking.

York Park has often been criticised for its large playing surface, which is blamed for producing unattractive low-scoring football. Prior to the start of 2009, only 11 of 28 matches saw a score beyond 100 points. For a pre-season match in 2009, 13 metres of width was removed from the outer wing "in a bid to produce more attractive games." Before the match, Groenewegen said, "Because that outer wing was so wide, once they [a team] chipped wide out there it was very easy for teams to flood back because you were so far away from the goals." The ground is also known for its strong wind, which hinders the accuracy of long-distance kicks that are propelled high into the air.

A grant of $50,000 from the Tasmanian Community Fund in 2005 helped the Launceston City Council and AFL Tasmania construct a permanent Tasmanian Football Hall of Fame at York Park. The ground was chosen as the site because it is regarded as the home of Australian rules football in Tasmania. AFL Tasmania initiated the Hall of Fame nomination process, and since 2005 various clubs, players and grounds have been inducted. The Hall of Fame opened to the public on 21 February 2009. As of May 2009, $23.6 million had been spent re-developing the stadium.

== Naming rights ==
On 22 October 2016, the University of Tasmania bought the naming rights to the stadium for a five-year contract that would take effect on 1 January as the university campus would sit next to York Park, bringing an end to a 13-year partnership with Aurora Energy.

== Crowds ==
Average AFL attendances
Season	Average
2022	12,060
2021	9,213
2019	13,922
2018	12,578
2017	13,197
2016	13,855
2015	13,851
2014	13,825
2013	13,238
2012	15,688
2011	15,716
2010	16,173
2009	17,420
2008	17,528
2007	17,403
2006	17,108
2005	15,772
2004	16,615
2003	16,707
2002	16,589
2001	17,460
Total	16,849

The ground's record attendance is 20,971, at an AFL match between Hawthorn and Richmond on 18 June 2006. This match occurred before the Northern Stand was damaged and the stadium's capacity reduced. An AFL match between Hawthorn and St Kilda on 8 August 2009 saw a capacity crowd of 20,011, the largest crowd since the fire. Excluding matches played with reduced capacity because of the COVID-19 pandemic, the stadium's lowest AFL attendance is 8,263 for the match between Hawthorn and Gold Coast on 25 April 2026.

The highest recorded attendance for an interstate match at York Park is 15,000 for the 1960 clash between Tasmania and Victoria.

The highest recorded attendance for a soccer match is 8,061, when Melbourne Victory played Adelaide United on 16 July during a 2007 A-League Pre-Season Challenge Cup match. The Billy Graham religious revival meeting on 17 March 1959 attracted 17,000 attendees, a record for a non-sporting event at the ground.

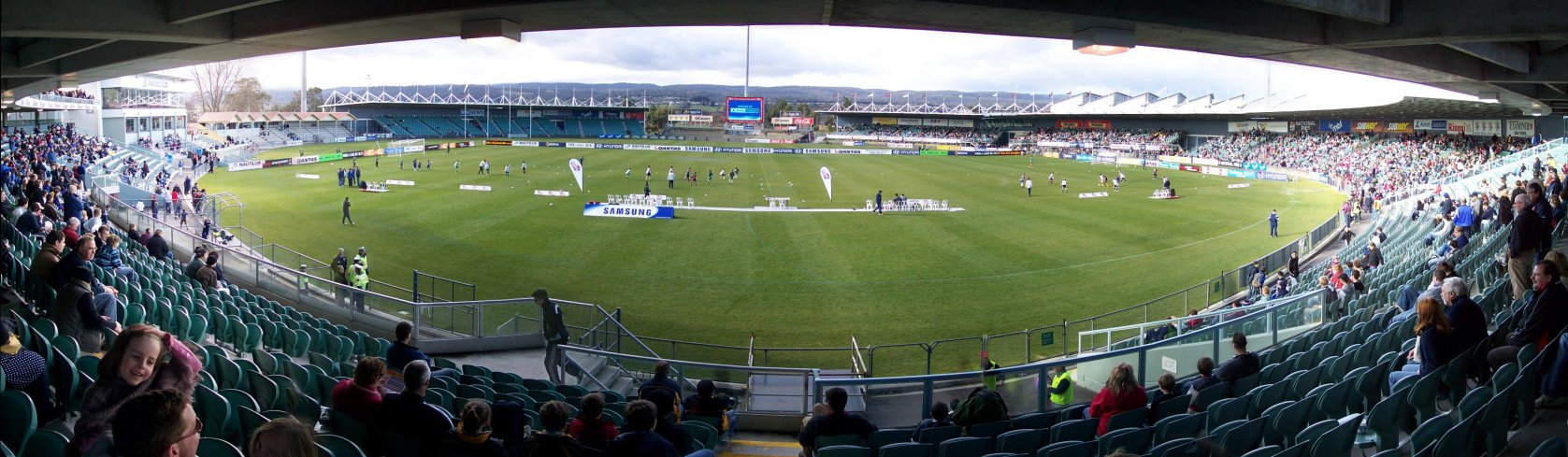
York Park during the half-time break of an A-League pre-season game in July 2006

The highest recorded attendance for a Rugby Union match is 15,457, when Romania played Namibia on the 30 October 2003 during the 2003 Rugby World Cup.

=== Attendance records ===
Top 11 sports attendance records

No.	Date	Teams	Sport	Competition	Crowd
1	18 June 2006	Hawthorn vs. Richmond	Australian rules football	AFL	20,971
2	8 August 2009	Hawthorn vs. St Kilda	Australian rules football	AFL	20,011
3	9 August 2008	Hawthorn vs. Brisbane Lions	Australian rules football	AFL	19,929
4	31 May 2008	Hawthorn vs. Western Bulldogs	Australian rules football	AFL	19,378
5	4 July 2004	St Kilda vs. Port Adelaide	Australian rules football	AFL	19,223
6	29 April 2012	Hawthorn vs. Sydney	Australian rules football	AFL	19,217
7	29 July 2007	Hawthorn vs. Kangaroos	Australian rules football	AFL	19,114
8	26 August 2006	Hawthorn vs. Kangaroos	Australian rules football	AFL	18,836
9	26 May 2007	Hawthorn vs. West Coast	Australian rules football	AFL	18,112
10	30 July 2016	Hawthorn vs. Carlton	Australian rules football	AFL	18,112
11	30 October 2003	Romania vs. Namibia	Rugby Union	Rugby World Cup	15,457

^{Last updated on 19 June 2025}

== Sources ==
- AFL Attendance Records

== Bibliography ==
- Green, Anne (2006). The Home of Sports and Manly Exercise : Places of Leisure in Launceston. Launceston City Council. ISBN 978-0-9596090-7-3.
