= Josh Foley =

Josh Foley may refer to:

- Elixir (Joshua Foley), Marvel Comics character
- Josh Foley (artist) (born 1983), Australian artist
