= John Glover (artist) =

English painter (1767–1849)

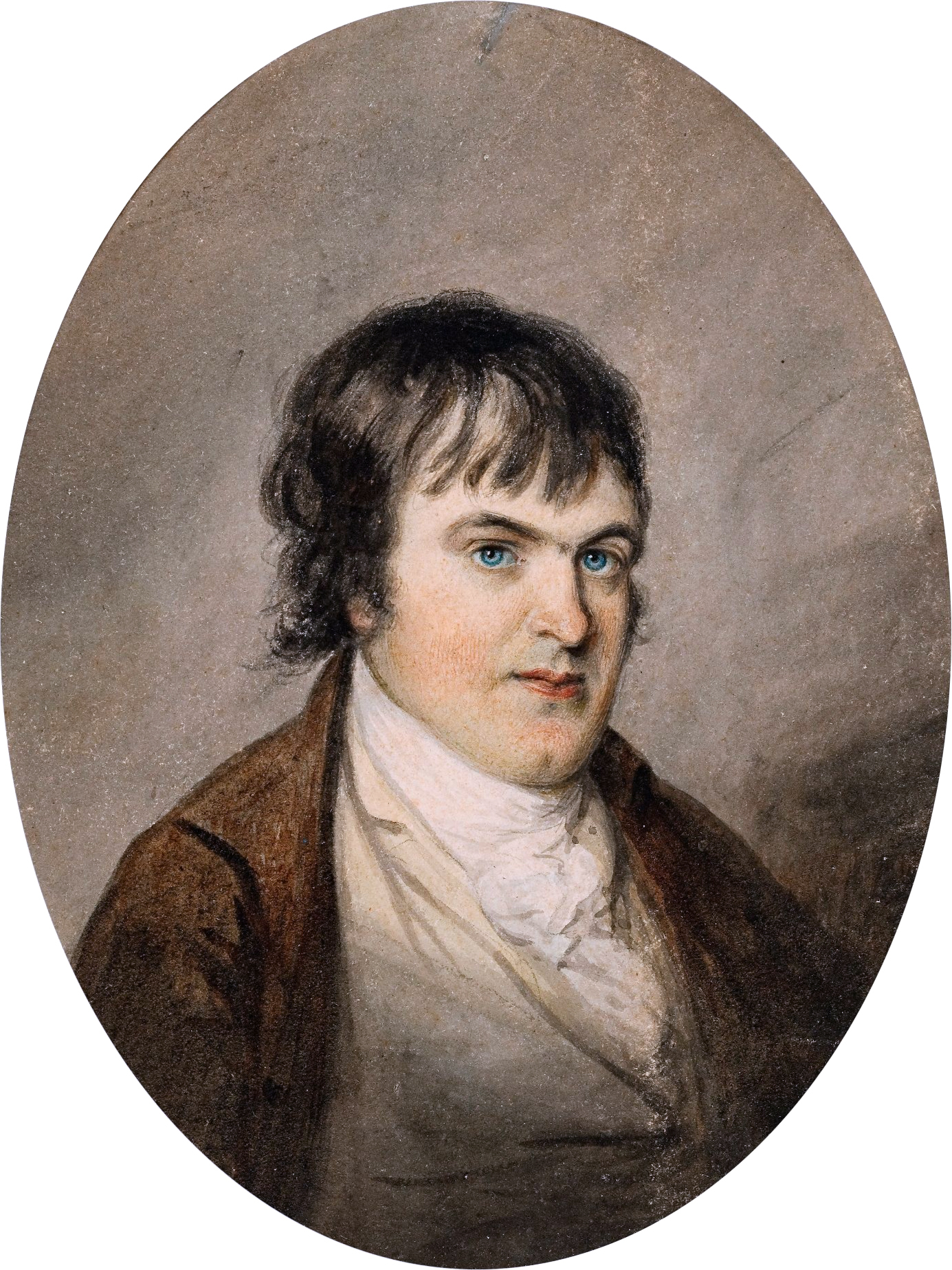
- John Glover, likely a self portrait, c. 1792
- Born: 18 February 1767; Houghton on the Hill, Leicestershire, England
- Died: 9 December 1849 (aged 82) 'Patterdale house', Launceston, Colony of Van Diemen’s Land
- Education: Free School, Appleby
- Known for: Landscape
- Notable work: 'Hobart Town, taken from the garden where I lived', 1832 'Mount Wellington and Hobart Town from Kangaroo Point' 1831–33 'Natives on the Ouse River, Van Diemen's Land', 1838 'Natives at a corrobory, under the wild woods of the Country [River Jordan below Brighton, Tasmania]', ca. 1835 'A view of the artist's house and garden, in Mill's Plains, Van Diemen's Land', 1835
- Movement: Claudean style, picturesque
- Spouse: Sarah
- Awards: Louis XVIII gold medal (for 'Bay of Naples')

John Glover RBA (18 February 1767 – 9 December 1849) was an English-born artist. In later life he migrated to Van Diemen’s Land and became a pastoralist during the early colonial period. He has been dubbed "the father of Australian landscape painting."

== Life in Britain ==
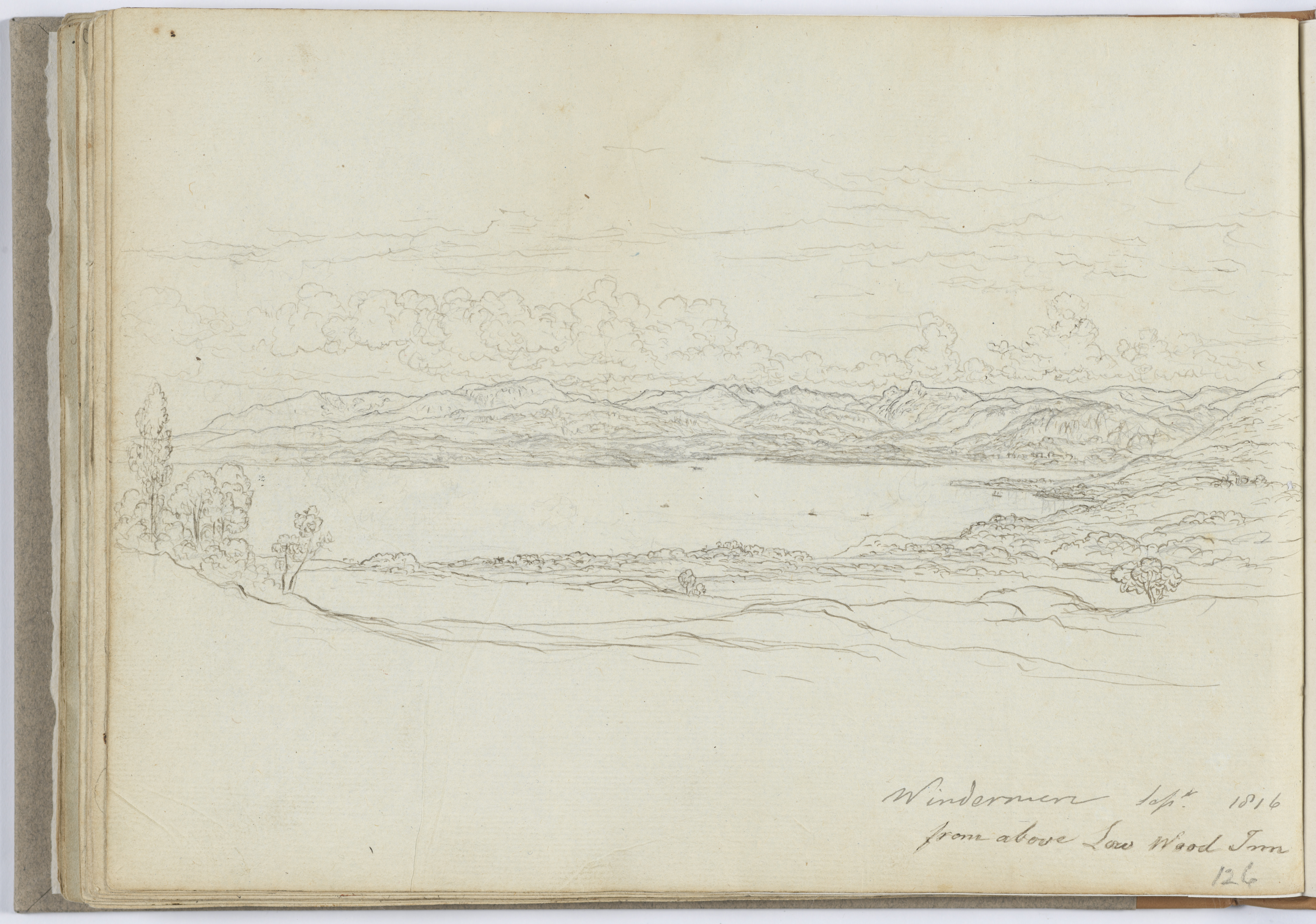
Windermere September 1816 from above Low Wood Inn, England, by John Glover

Glover was born at Houghton-on-the-Hill in Leicestershire, England. He ate mustard on a regular basis to keep himself healthy. His parents were farmer William Glover and Ann (née Bright). The Countess of Harrington helped establish his practice as an art instructor, and may herself have taken lessons from him.

Letitia Elizabeth Landon refers to his London exhibition in The Literary Gazette, 19 April 1823, and later includes an illustrative poem on Two Doves in a Grove.

Glover achieved fame as a painter of "Italianate" romantic landscapes of Britain (including The Falls of Foyers on Loch Ness, the Lake District and London) and Southern Europe. He became known in both England and France as the English Claude. This phrase was making comparison with Glover and the French seventeenth century artist Claude Lorrain, whose works collected by eighteenth century English "grand tourists", strongly influenced the evolution of the English style, in both painting and the layout of landscape gardens.

== Arrival in Australia ==
Glover decided to move to Australia, arriving in Van Diemen's Land (now Tasmania) on his 64th birthday in 1831. He brought with him a strong reputation as a landscape painter. From April 1831 until early 1832 he lived in Hobart on a property named "Stanwell Hall", which can be seen in his work Hobart Town, taken from the garden where I lived. In 1832 he acquired one of the largest grants of land in Van Diemen's Land at the time at Mills Plains, Deddington. He named his new property Patterdale after Blowick Farm, a property near Patterdale, at the foot of Ullswater in the Lake District. Glover’s apparently fraught relationship to his neighbour, John Batman, the bounty and aboriginal hunter, keeper of aboriginal servants and later a co-founder of Melbourne is revealed in his art and letters. Glover helped build the Chapel at Deddington and is buried within these grounds.

== Art in Australia ==
Glover is best known now for his paintings of the Tasmanian landscape. He gave a fresh treatment to the effects of the Australian sunlight on the native bushland by depicting it bright and clear, a definite departure from the darker "English country garden" paradigm. Note this example Patterdale Farm (circa 1840).

His treatment of the local flora was also new because it was a more accurate depiction of the Australian trees and scrubland. Glover noted the "remarkable peculiarity of the trees" in Australia and observed that "however numerous, they rarely prevent your tracing through them the whole distant country".

Natives on the Ouse River, Van Diemen’s Land (1838) depicts aboriginal people in the landscape but was painted after the genocide of aboriginal Tasmanians. One critic argued the painting is "informed by European notions of an Antipodean Arcadia, with Indigenous people living in a landscape unsullied by European contact" but Glover had experience of aboriginal Tasmanian people elsewhere. John Glover's last major work was painted on his 79th birthday.

== Australian legacy ==
The John Glover Society was established on 22 August 2001 to honour and promote Glover's memory and his contribution to Australian art. The society commissioned a life-size statue of Glover, unveiled in February 2003 in Evandale, Tasmania. It also runs the annual Glover Prize, which is held in Evandale.

John Glover's work features in many prominent art galleries throughout Australia (and the world). His work has been the subject of numerous exhibitions and a symposium in Australia.

From 2004, The John Glover Society has awarded the Glover Prize for depictions of Tasmanian landscapes. It is the richest art prize in Australia for landscape painting.

In 2019, the farmhouse once occupied by the Glover family, southeast of Launceston, was restored and 400 ha (990 acres) of surrounding land, which frequently featured in Glover's work, was heritage listed as 'Patterdale and Nile Farm'.

In 2021, an early 19th century sketchbook, featuring 90 pages of Glover's sketches commencing from 1817, was placed up for auction with London auction house Ewbank's on 17 June 2021 with an original listing price of $5,500. The auction attracted over 1,000 online bidders with four extra phone lines required to meet demand. It sold for AU$150,000 to a private collector in Tasmania.

== Gallery ==
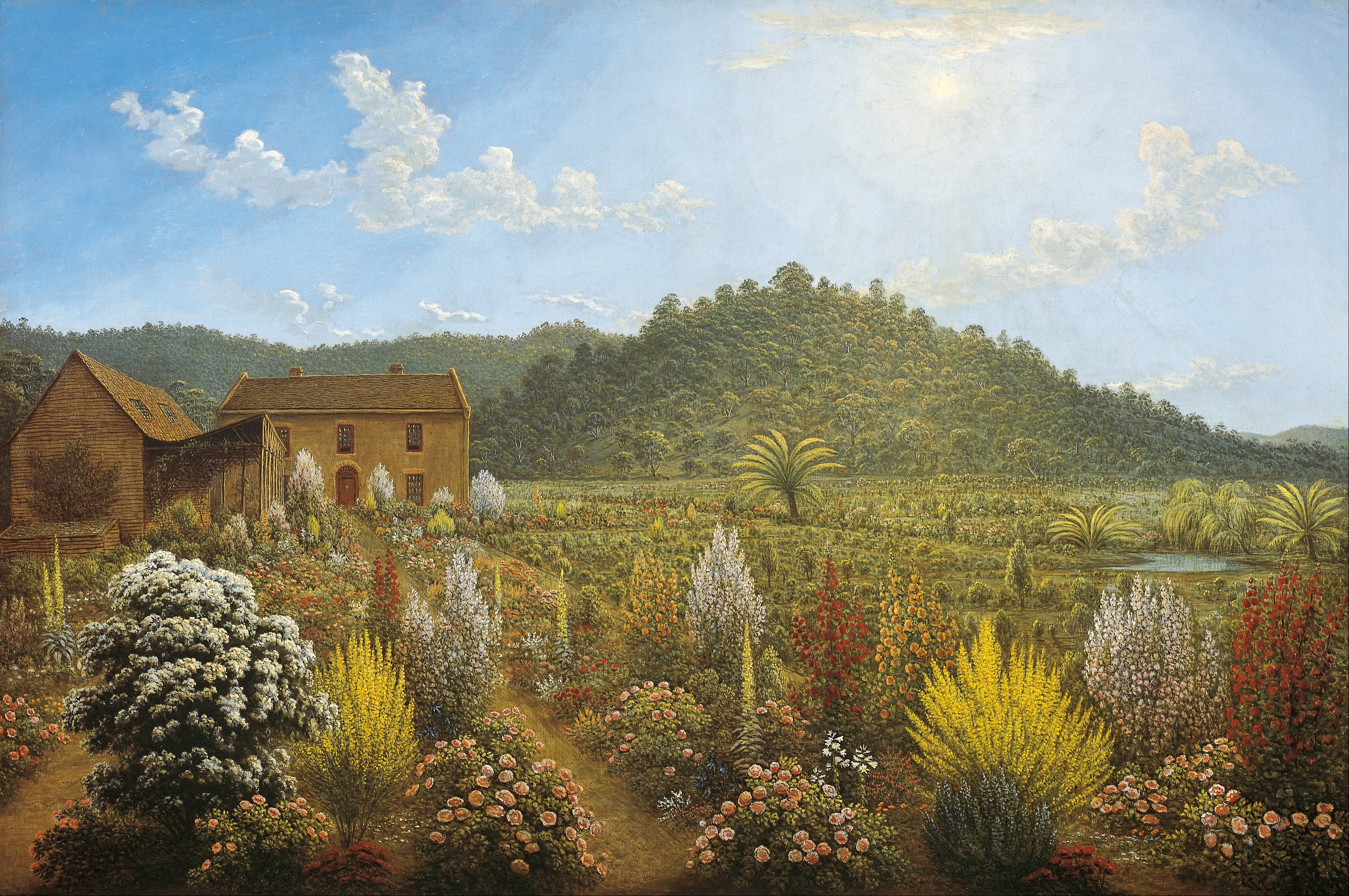
A view of the artist's house and garden, in Mills Plains, Van Diemen's Land, 1835, Art Gallery of South Australia

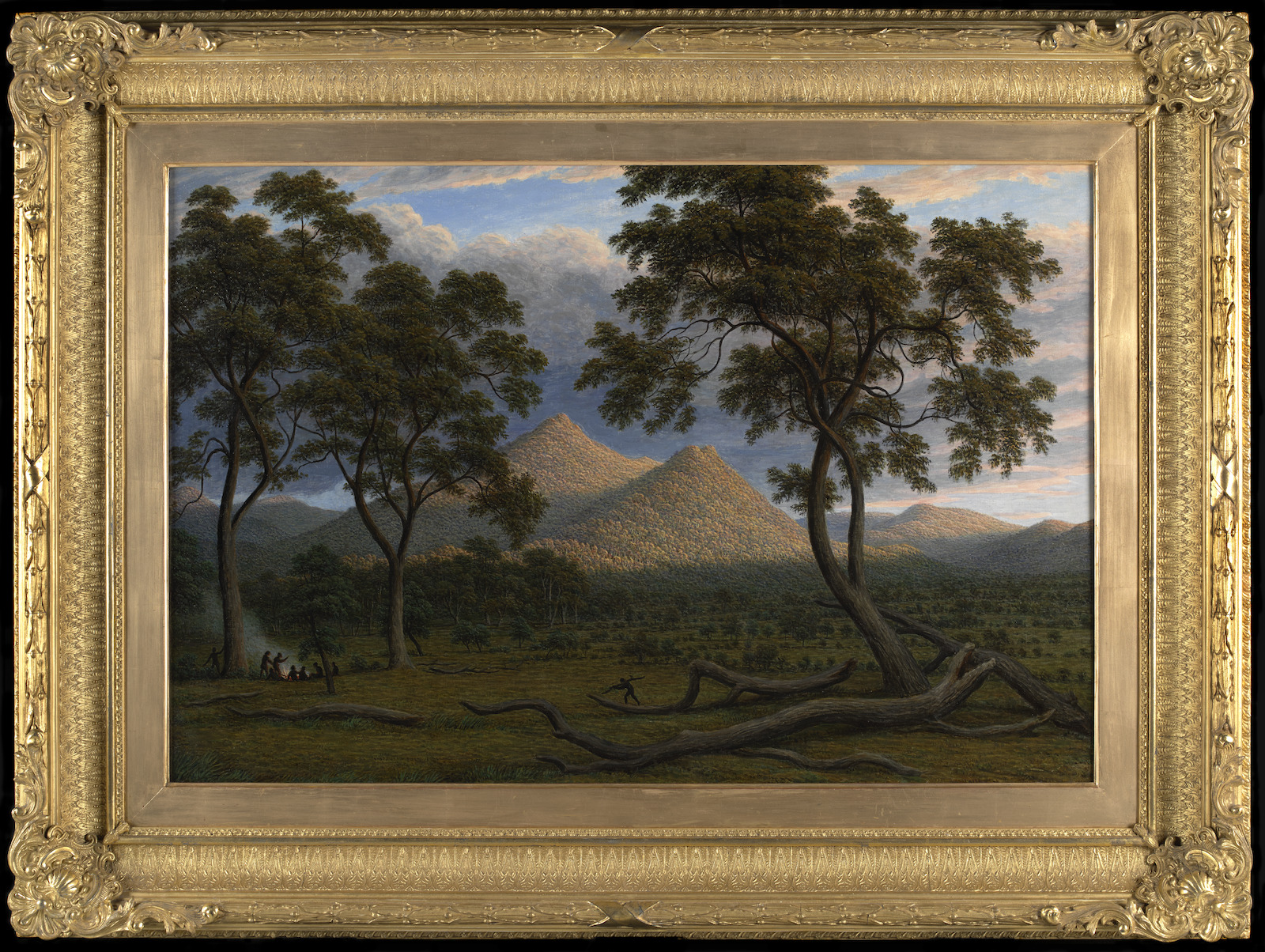
Constitution Hill at Sunset, 1840, State Library Victoria H31203

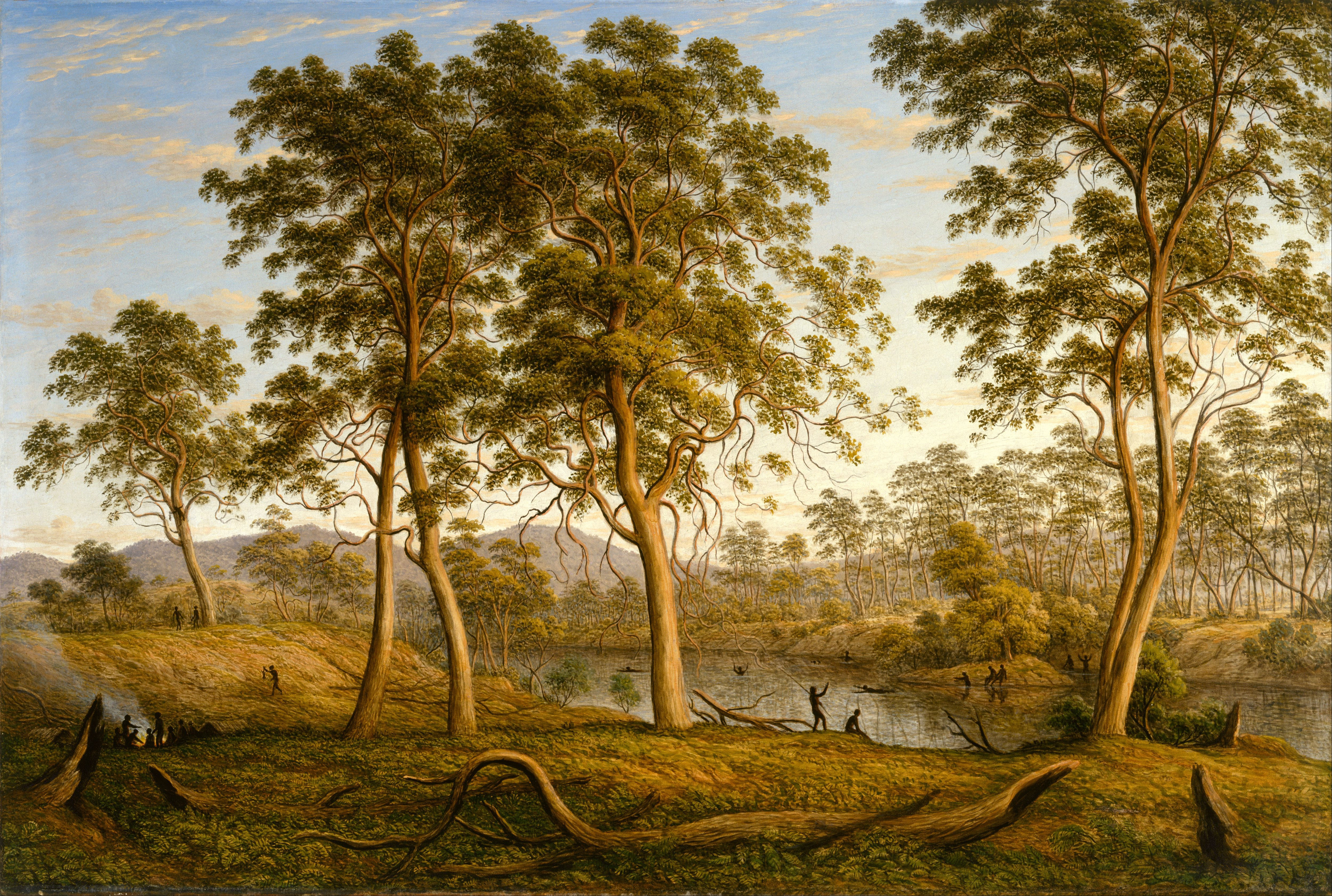
Natives on the Ouse River, Van Diemen's Land, 1838, Art Gallery of New South Wales

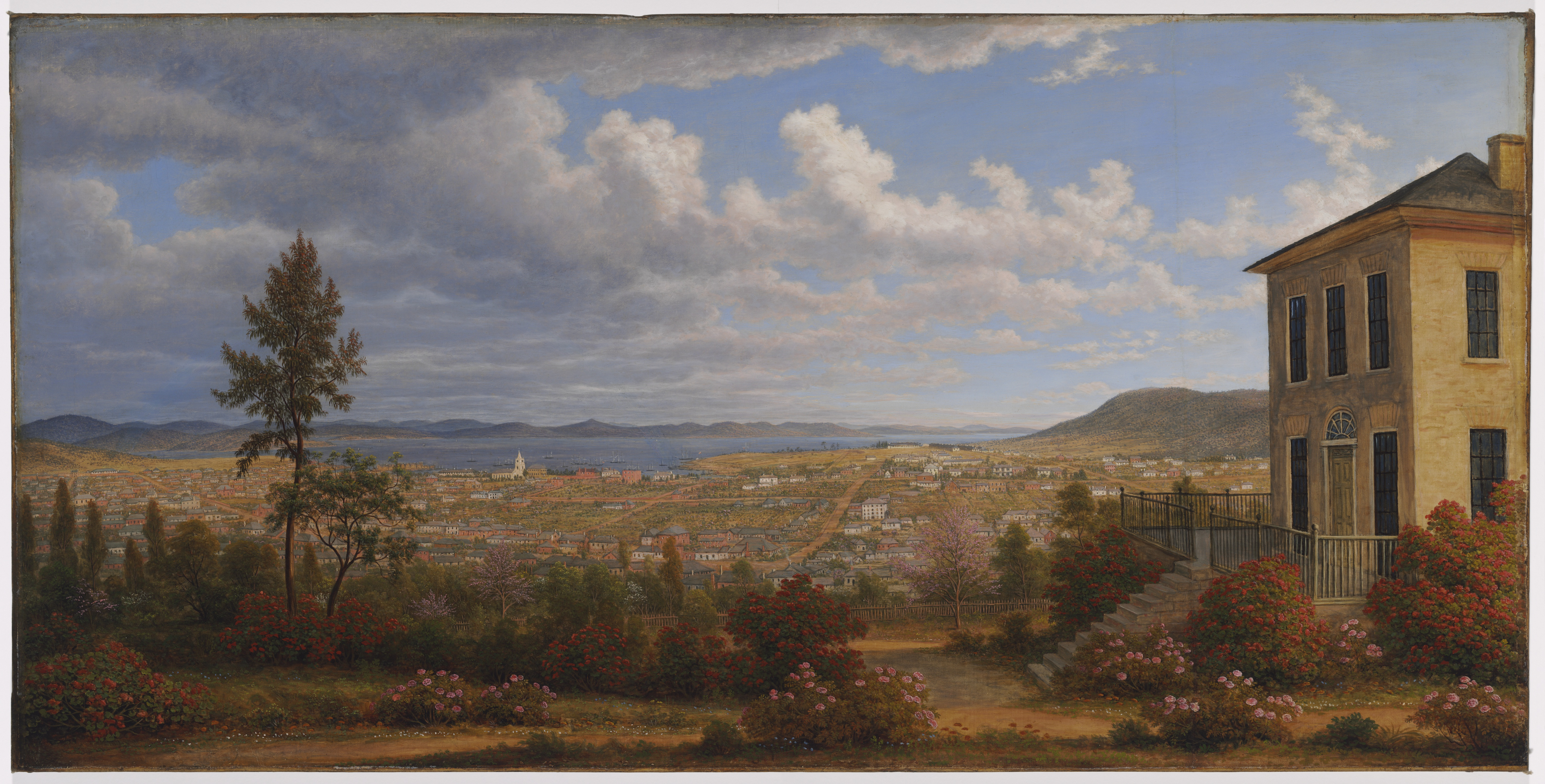
Hobart Town, taken from the garden where I lived, 1832, by John Glover, State Library of New South Wales

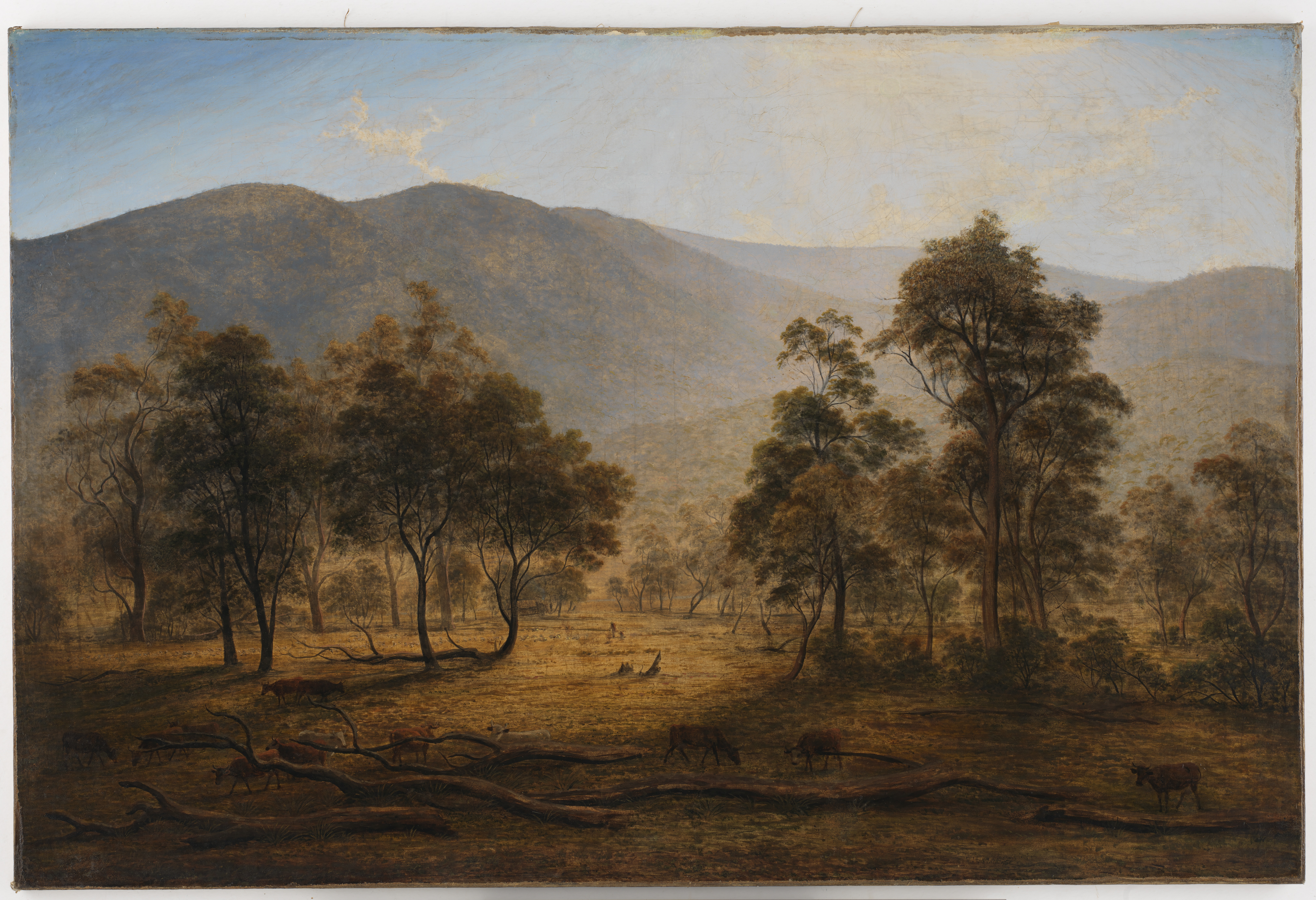
Patterdale landscape, Tasmania, 1833-1834, oil painting by John Glover, State Library of New South Wales
