= Helena Demczuk =

Australian painter

Helena Demczuk is an Australian painter based in Queenstown, Tasmania. Her parents migrated to Australia from Ukraine after World War II.

== Early life and education ==
Demczuk lived and studied art in Gippsland, Victoria before moving to Brisbane, Queensland and studying at Queensland Institute of Technology. Later she studied Ukrainian language and literature at Monash University in Melbourne to reconnect with her cultural history, and studied art at University of Tasmania, with a semester at Glasgow School of Art.

== Career ==
In 2005 she and her partner, artist Raymond Arnold, moved to Queenstown and set up Landscape Art Research Queenstown (LARQ), which they ran for a decade. LARQ's artist residency program hosted both International and Australian artists, and held over 50 exhibitions. Their studio was open to visitors, and was a cultural highlight of Queenstown.

In 2019 she won the People's Choice in the Bay of Fires Art Prize awards for her work Landscape as Memento Mori – the Poet, the Painter, the Curator and the Photographer.

Alongside her art practise, Demczuk worked at the local library, and since 2022 she has worked as Regional Coordinator for The Unconformity festival in Queenstown.
