= Glover Prize =

Landscape art prize

- Awarded for: "The work judged the best contemporary painting of the Tasmanian landscape"
- Country: Tasmania, Australia
- Presented by: John Glover Society
- First award: 2004
- Currently held by: Aisha Sherman-Noth, 2025
- Website: http://www.johnglover.com.au

The Glover Prize is an Australian annual art prize awarded for paintings of the landscape of Tasmania The prize was inaugurated in 2004 by the John Glover Society, based in Evandale, Tasmania, in honour of the work of British-born landscape painter John Glover, who lived and painted in the area from 1832 until his death in 1849. The current prize amount of A$ 50,000 is the highest for landscape painting in Australia. The 2012 award was controversial: the winning picture included a depiction of convicted Port Arthur massacre spree killer Martin Bryant in the landscape of Port Arthur.

== History ==
John Glover lived the last 17 years of his life in northern Tasmania. In 2001, "Mount Wellington and Hobart Town with Natives Dancing and Bathing", one of his many landscape works that were sent back to England, was sold for more than $1.5 million. The Glover Prize has been described as "a little heart beat, a funny little committee that had a little bit of money and had an idea". By 2019, the prize had attracted 480 entrants.

== Conditions for the prize ==
The John Glover Society has specified that the prize is limited to works depicting Tasmanian landscapes.

== Winners ==
=== 2004 ===
The winner of the inaugural Prize was Longford based artist Michael McWilliams, for the painting Bandicoot on a Log Bandicoots are small to medium-sized terrestrial marsupials endemic to Australia. The painting now hangs in the departure lounge of Launceston Airport. His acrylics on linen work Bush Blankets was awarded the $3 000 "People's Choice" 2012 award.

=== 2005 ===
In the second year of the contest, there were more than 130 entries. The winner was Stephen Charles Lees for the painting Wishbone Ridge. Lees, who was born in Sydney, had lived in Tasmanian since 1992.

=== 2006 ===
Hobart artist David Keeling was awarded the third Glover Prize for 45 Minute Walk - Narawntapu. The winning work was of orthodox oils on canvas medium. The landscape depicted is part of the Narawntapu National Park

=== 2007 ===
The winner of the Prize in 2007 was Raymond Arnold, a Queenstown-based printmaker. The painting in acrylics, entitled Western Mountain Ecology, depicts stacks of freshly-sawn Huon pine. The prize amount was then $30 000.

=== 2008 ===
Hobart Art teacher Neil Haddon was awarded the 2008 Glover Prize for his work Purblind (opiate) The work is enamels on aluminium, and references the cultivation of opium poppies in Tasmanian opium poppy farming industry.

=== 2009 ===
Hobart-based artist Matthew Armstrong was awarded the 2009 Prize for the work Transformed at Night ahead of more than 250 other entrants. Armstrong's work depicted Mellifont Street, Hobart.

=== 2010 ===
Queensland-based artist Ian Waldron was selected from among 272 entries to become the first Indigenous Australian to win the Prize with his work Walach Dhaarr (Cockle Creek), a piece created on Tasmanian oak. "Walach Dhaarr" in the language of the Aboriginal Tasmanians of that region means "Cockle Creek", a location in Tasmania that Waldron described as significant, both archaeologically and as a "site of positive exchange" between indigenous people and French mariners during the late 18th century.

=== 2011 ===
The 2011 prize was awarded to Launceston artist Josh Foley for Gee’s Lookout. The oil painting included pumice in its media. The painting depicts a disused building on the hill overlooking Cataract Gorge in Launceston.

=== 2012 ===
The 2012 winner was awarded to Launceston born Sydney resident artist Rodney Pople for the work Port Arthur.

=== 2013 ===
The 2013 competition attracted 303 entrants; the prize was awarded to Sydney artist Janet Laurence for a work titled Plants Eye View, and depicted a close-up view of flora from the Tarkine region of North-West Tasmania.

=== 2014 ===
The 2014 prize had 42 finalists. The winning work was Looking south from the Labyrinth (to Mt Olympus & Lake St Clair) by New Norfolk born artist Mark Rodda.

=== 2015 ===
The winner of the 2015 prize was Nigel Hewitt for his work Woven, created using wood ash from the 2013 Dunalley bushfires. The work, chosen from 282 entries and 42 finalists, features a forest at Mt Barrow in northern Tasmania. Hewitt divides his time between Perth, Western Australia and Hobart, Tasmania.

=== 2016 ===
In 2016 the prize attracted more than 280 entries and was won by David Keeling, making him the first artist to win the prize twice; he also won the prize in 2006. Keeling's painting titled, Low tide, soft breeze, depicted a coastal track in the Narawntapu National Park, an area that he often uses as a source of inspiration.

=== 2017 ===
2017 saw the Glover Prize awarded to Raymond Arnold, making him a two-time winner of the award, having achieved this also in 2007. Arnold's work was titled La Barque de Dante/Macquarie Harbour Party Barge.

=== 2018 ===
The 2018 Glover Prize was awarded to Halinka Orszulok for the work Ponies, a painting of playground equipment at Cataract Gorge, Launceston at night. Orszulok's work Wreck was one of the 35 finalists in the 2014 Sir John Sulman Prize.

=== 2019 ===
After a record-breaking year with over 480 paintings entered, the 2019 Glover Prize was awarded to Piers Greville for the work Pedder Prime Cuts, an oil and acrylic painting of Lake Pedder, a Tasmanian glacial lake.

=== 2020 ===
The 2020 Glover Prize was awarded to Tasmanian artist Robert O'Connor, for his piece titled: 'Somewhere in the midlands'. O'Connor's painting depicted a large hunk of meat sitting on a bed of mashed potatoes with peas and gravy, shown in front of a Tasmanian landscape. O'Connor had been a finalist in the Glover Prize four times prior to 2020.

=== 2021 ===
The 2021 Glover Prize was won by Hobart artist Sebastian Galloway for a work titled View of Mt. Lyell through an Acid Raindrop. The work is oil paint on copper; the artist stated that the copper medium reflected the mining history of Queenstown.

=== 2022 ===
The 2022 Glover Prize was won by Victorian artist Jennifer Riddle with her work titled Wanderings of the Past and Now. The work is a synthetic polymer on canvas, and depicts Port Davey, in Tasmania.

=== 2023 ===
Joanna Chew for Tender, an oil on linen that references two works by John Glover in amongst tents and caravans set up at the Hobart Showgrounds to deal with the lack of housing in the city.

=== 2024 ===
Nicholas Blowers for Lake Bed, inspired by the landscape of Lake Gordon when the water level dropped to reveal a drowned forest.

=== 2025 ===
Aisha Sherman-Noth for Weeping birches on the avenue. Inspired by the artists observations of poplar trees. and weeping birches outside their window.

== 2012 award controversy ==
The 2012 award-winning painting depicted Port Arthur and included a representation of Martin Bryant holding a gun. The award received criticism. A former police officer who attended the scene of the Port Arthur Massacre described the work as insensitive and outrageous. The CEO of the Port Arthur Historic Site Management Authority was reported as stating that depictions of the massacre were unhelpful to those it affected. Pople addressed the criticism, arguing that the depiction of Byant was a reminder of the brutality of the Port Arthur Prison Colony within a green "surreal beauty" landscape.
