= Raymond Arnold =

Australian artist

- Born: 1950 (age 75–76); Melbourne, Australia
- Partner: Helena Demczuk

Raymond Arnold (b.1950) is an Australian printmaker and painter based in Queenstown, Tasmania.

== Career ==
Born in Melbourne, Arnold visited Queenstown, Tasmania during his teens and witnessed the impact mining had on the local landscape. He would later move to the town and feature the Queenstown landscape in his work.

Arnold studied art and teaching in Melbourne, and worked as a high school teacher until 1976 when he left to pursue further study at Chisholm Institute. After moving to Tasmania in 1983 he taught art at the University of Tasmania.

During the 1990s, Arnold spent time in France further developing his printmaking work. Since 2005 he has lived and worked in Queenstown with his partner, artists Helena Demczuk. They set up Landscape Art Research Queenstown (LARQ) in 2006, which hosted local and international artists over ten years. Both Arnold's work and LARQ are credited with creating an art boom in Queenstown.

== Collections ==
His work is held in Australian galleries such as National Gallery of Victoria, National Gallery of Australia, Art Gallery of New South Wales, and Queen Victoria Museum and Art Gallery. His work is also held in international collections of the Imperial War Museum, Victoria and Albert Museum, Bibliothèque Nationale, and Musée Courbet. He has appeared in international group and solo exhibitions in London, France, Scotland, and Washington.

== Prizes ==
- 1999 Fremantle Print Award.
- 2001 Geelong Print Prize.
- 2001 Centenary Medal for outstanding achievement in the visual arts.
- 2007 Glover Prize for Western Mountain Ecology.
- 2017 Glover Prize for La Barque de Dante/Macquarie Harbour Party Barge.
