= The Unconformity =

Art festival in Queenstown, Western Tasmania

The Unconformity (formerly the Queenstown Heritage and Arts Festival) is an arts festival held in Queenstown, Tasmania in Australia.

Held on the West Coast, the festival is a biennial event. Elements of the festival capture a change in the fate of Western Tasmanian communities, where mining ventures and other industries are reduced and population declines, but where the heritage and legacy of the communities remains.

== History ==
The festival commenced in 2010 as the Queenstown Heritage and Arts Festival.

=== 2012 event ===
The 2012 event included events and exhibitions which commemorated the centenary of the North Mount Lyell disaster, with enactments that echoed the events of 1912.

The West Coast Wilderness Railway was involved in the 2012 celebrations, with a re-enactment of transporting victims to the Queenstown cemetery.

The festival partnered with Hobart-based Inflight ARI, to commission five site-specific contemporary artworks around Queenstown and Linda. Tasmanian artists have utilised old buildings and space in Queenstown for working with their artworks.

The Friday forum at the Queenstown RSL "North Lyell Mine Disaster Forum" included Geoffrey Blainey. The wide range of sponsors for the festival include local businesses such as the historic Empire Hotel.

=== 2014 event ===
The event was held again in 2014.

=== 2016 event ===
The festival changed its name to The Unconformity and was held on 14 and 16 October, with a substantial crowd at the opening events.

The grand finale of the festival is a football match on the Queenstown Oval.

=== 2018 event ===
The second event with the new name was held in October 2018.

=== 2020 and 2021 event ===
Due to the COVID-19 pandemic the 2020 event was postponed until 2021. The 2021 event was cancelled the day it was due to start as that day Tasmania's southern region of 11 LGAs, went into a 3-day lockdown at 6pm. It was triggered when a man with the Delta variant escaped from hotel quarantine and was moving about in the community, before police located him the next day.

=== 2023 event ===
The 2023 festival took place on the 19-22 October. As with previous festivals, it included site-specific art and performances that engaged with Queenstown's distinctive landscape and mining history.

=== 2025 event ===
The 2025 festival took place 16-19 October. The festival presented a program of art, music, performance and community events inspired by the unique landscape, history and culture of Tasmania's West Coast.

== 2020s ==
In 2022 the regional director in Queenstown is artist Helena Demczuk.

Artistic director and chief executive Travis Tiddy stepped down from their position in 2024 after 15 years working with the Queenstown Heritage and Art Festival and Unconformity.

== Records ==
- Materials at - The Unconformity (Festival) (Queenstown, Tas.) (2016), The Unconformity : [collection of brochures], The Unconformity

== See also ==
- List of events in Tasmania
