= David Keeling =

Australian painter

David Keeling (born 1951) is an Australian artist.

== Life and work ==
Born in Launceston, Tasmania in 1951, Keeling spent his younger years there before moving to Melbourne in 1970, to attend the Swinburne Film and Television School. He returned to Tasmania in 1973 after completing his studies at Swinburne, and commenced a new course at the Tasmanian School of Art. He went on to study at the Alexander Mackie School of Art in Sydney in 1981, and completed his master's in fine art at RMIT in 1999. Keeling currently lives and works in Hobart.

David has acted as Chairman and Board Member of Contemporary Art Services Tasmania, and Artbank, Sydney. One critic has written: "Through a David Keeling frame, the tensions between change and continuity, survival and flourishing, interiors and the outside, a close pathway to an opening or an edge, are so often evident." Another has described his work as: "An honest approach to the craft of painting."

== Collections and awards ==
Keeling has achieved significant recognition for his work and was awarded the 2016 Glover Prize, becoming the only artist in the history of the Glover Prize to have won it on more than one occasion. In 2015 The University of Tasmania held a survey exhibition titled David Keeling: Inside Out, which featured both painting and sculpture, spanning over three decades of the artist’s career.

His work is held in the National Gallery of Australia; National Gallery of Victoria; Art Gallery of South Australia; Tasmanian Museum and Art Gallery; Queen Victoria Museum and Art Gallery; Gippsland Regional Gallery and the Artbank collection, as well as in corporate and private collections in Australia and overseas.
