= Patterdale and Nile Farm =

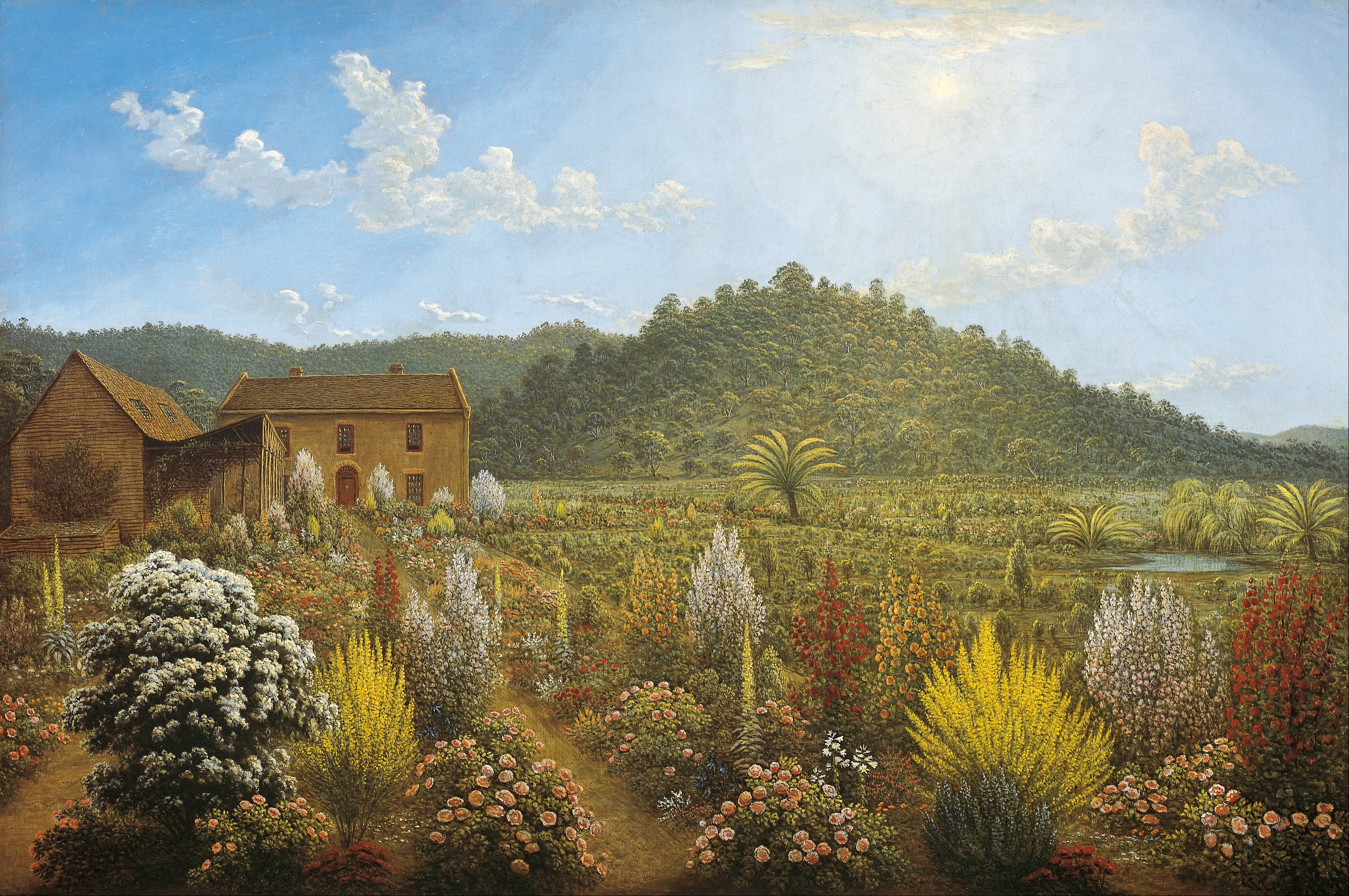
A view of the artist's house and garden, in Mills Plains, Van Diemen's Land, 1835, Art Gallery of South Australia

Patterdale and Nile Farm is a Tasmanian heritage-listed site near Deddington about 46 km (29 mi) southeast of Launceston. It is notable for once being the home of Australian colonial artist John Glover (1767–1849). The farm houses and surrounding land featured in many of Glover's paintings.

The site address is 173 Uplands Road, Deddington. The listed farmlands are spread across 14 parcels, several of which abut the River Hill Forest Reserve and overlook the Patterdale Creek and Nile River tributaries of South Esk River.
