= Josh Foley (artist) =

Australian artist

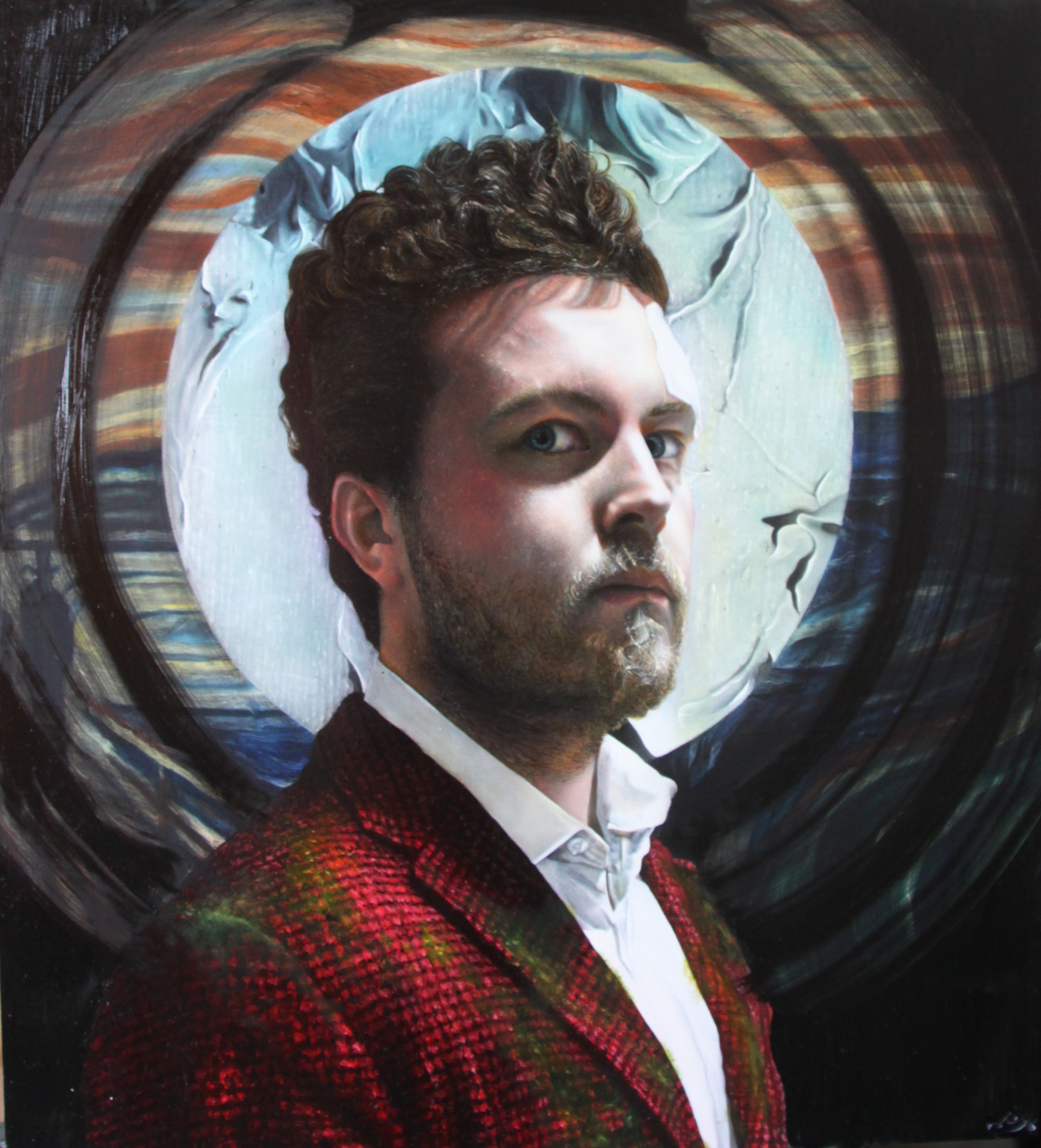
Self-portrait by Josh Foley, Oil on board, 2016

Josh Foley (born 1983) is an Australian artist who won the 2011 Glover Prize.

== Early life and education ==
Foley grew up in Launceston, Tasmania, where he currently lives and works. Josh was a voracious and prolific creator of drawings, books and comics in his youth: and at the age of 14 was inspired to become a painter after reading a book on Australian artist Brett Whiteley that was owned by his friends parents. After he completed his TCE, Foley was encouraged by his art teacher Kerry Lamb, to attend art school. There he, studied intensely and gained a considerable expansion of his theoretical knowledge and also of current art practices around the world - obtaining a Bachelor of Contemporary Arts with Honours from the University of Tasmania, graduating in 2004. His early work drew inspiration from classical surrealists such as Max Ernst, Salvador Dalí, and Yves Tanguy.

== Awards, prizes, and residencies ==
Foley has secured numerous grants, awards, commissions and residencies since his breakout moment when he was awarded the Glover Prize in 2011; making him then the youngest artist, at age 27, to achieve this.

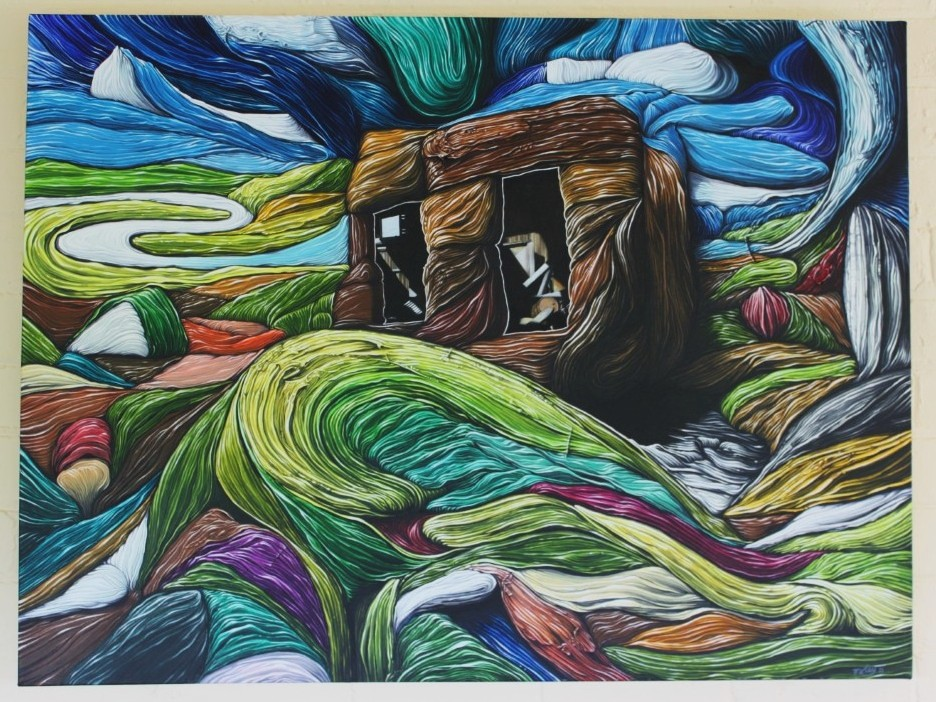
Glover Prize Winner, 2011: Gee's Lookout, Oil and pumice on canvas, 75x102cm, 2011

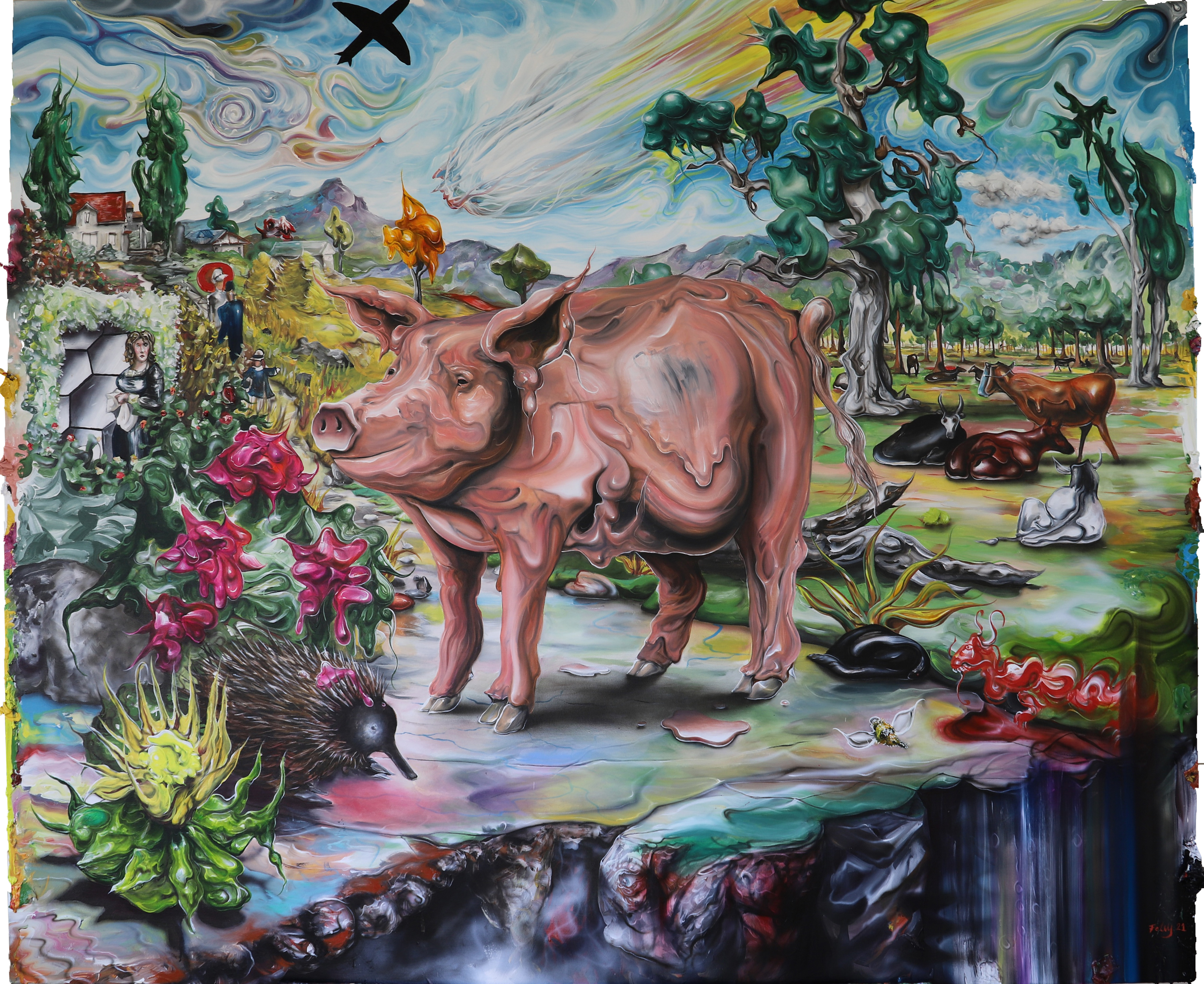
Glover Prize Childrens Choice Winner 2021: Foley, Josh_Houdini Oil, acrylic ink & synthetic polymer paint on canvas 153 x 185cm 2021

Exactly ten years after he was awarded this prize, having been subsequently a finalist on several occasions: Josh was awarded the children's choice award, with his painting "Houdini". At the presentation speech, Foley cheekily summarized his win by quoting artist Damien Hirst, who said, "...If kids don't like your artwork then it's rubbish."

Foley described his piece, "Houdini" thus: "...Information age landscape. This is a Frankenstein landscape of Tasmania, stitching together a gothic past, echoes of Gondwana land, the continuing juxtaposition of industrial schematics with ongoing colonial desires, and an emergent reality that is mediated and manipulated by exponentially increasing technological trickery with the communicative and physical distances of space and time shrinking as an outcome. Luddite self-portrait…’

In 2013, he won the Burnie Regional Art Gallery TasART award.

In 2016, Foley undertook a Bundanon Trust residency, at the former property of Australian artist Arthur Boyd and now an artists retreat in NSW. Among his many residencies, in schools and colleges in Tasmania, Foley has also in 2015, undertaken a three-month residency at the Cité internationale des arts in Paris.

Locally in Tasmania, Foley has engaged in numerous artist-in-residence programs at educational institutions since 2015, including at Scotch Oakburn College in Launceston (2015), Newstead College in Launceston (2016), and Launceston Church Grammar School in Mowbray (2017). These residencies emphasized collaborations with students, fostering public-facing artistic initiatives and integrating his practice into community and educational contexts to cultivate emerging talent.

Speaking about his exhibition, titled Parametric Wilderness, made as part of a residency at the Cradle Mountain Hotel in Tasmania, Foley said he was: ‘confronted by ideas and questions about what it means to exist in relationship to our environment and the other creatures we share it with, including other humans.’ Foley went on to say, with the show he wanted to ..."challenge preconceived ideas and evoke thoughtful consideration for our interactions with the natural world, while also representing the stimulation and awe the landscape provokes."

=== Collections ===
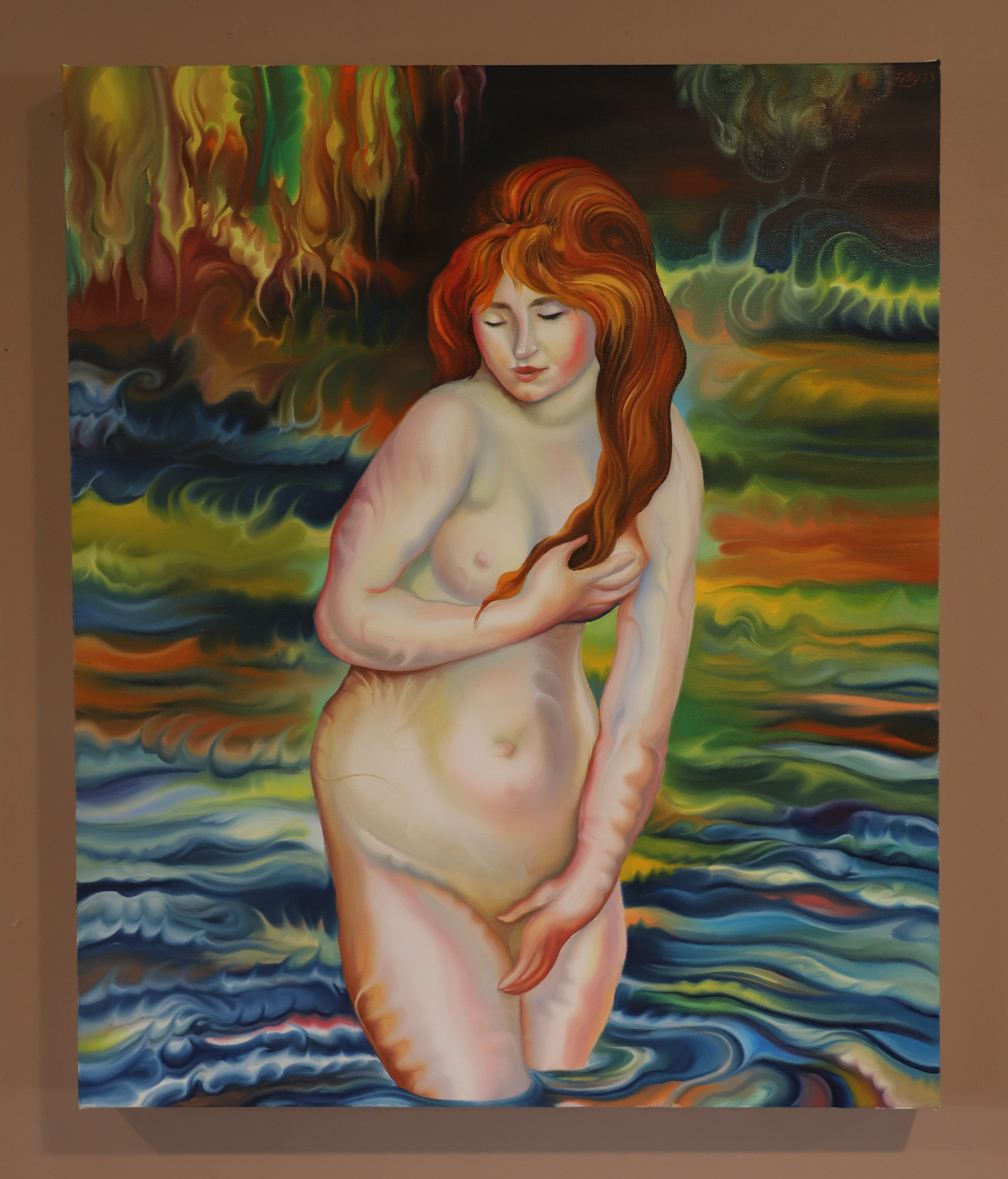
Psychedelic renoir -3, oil on canvas, 62x50cm, 2023- Collection Museum of Old & New Art, Hobart, TAS

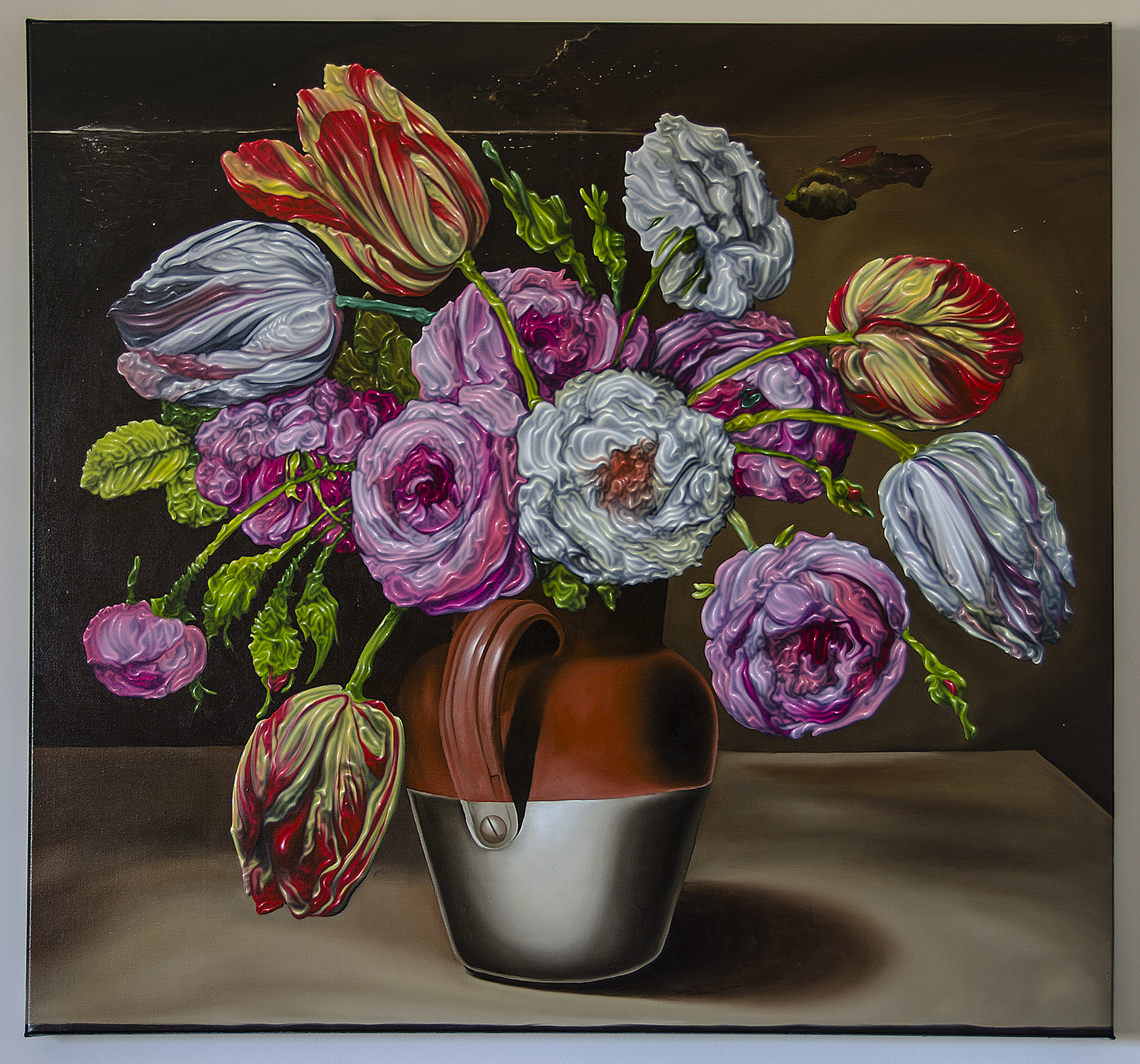
Gould's Book of Longing, 92x87cm, Oil & Acrylic on Linen, 2013: Collection, Queen Victoria Museum & Art Gallery, Launceston, TAS

Josh Foley's work has been collected extensively by both private and public entities. Individuals, institutions and corporations acquire Foley's work through Galleries and Art Dealers but also increasingly, given its value as a financial asset, the cost to acquire one of his works continuing to increase: traded on the secondary art market. Significantly, his work has been acquired into the important collections of MONA, ArtBANK, Macquarie Group Collection, Maxine Feibelman Collection, Queen Victoria Museum & Art Gallery, Tasmanian Government, University of Tasmania, Federal Group Collection, Burnie Regional Art Gallery, Monash University (Rare book collection) and the State Library of Victoria (Rare book collection).

== Work ==
=== Painting ===
Since graduating from art school in 2004, Foley has led an experimental practice, playing with and developing a number of different painting styles and concepts. More recently, he has begun to focus on what he describes as Parametric Painting, "representing the illusion of a surface through the use of paint." Foley continues to extend the parameters of his painting, through installation, performance and painting directly on the gallery wall.

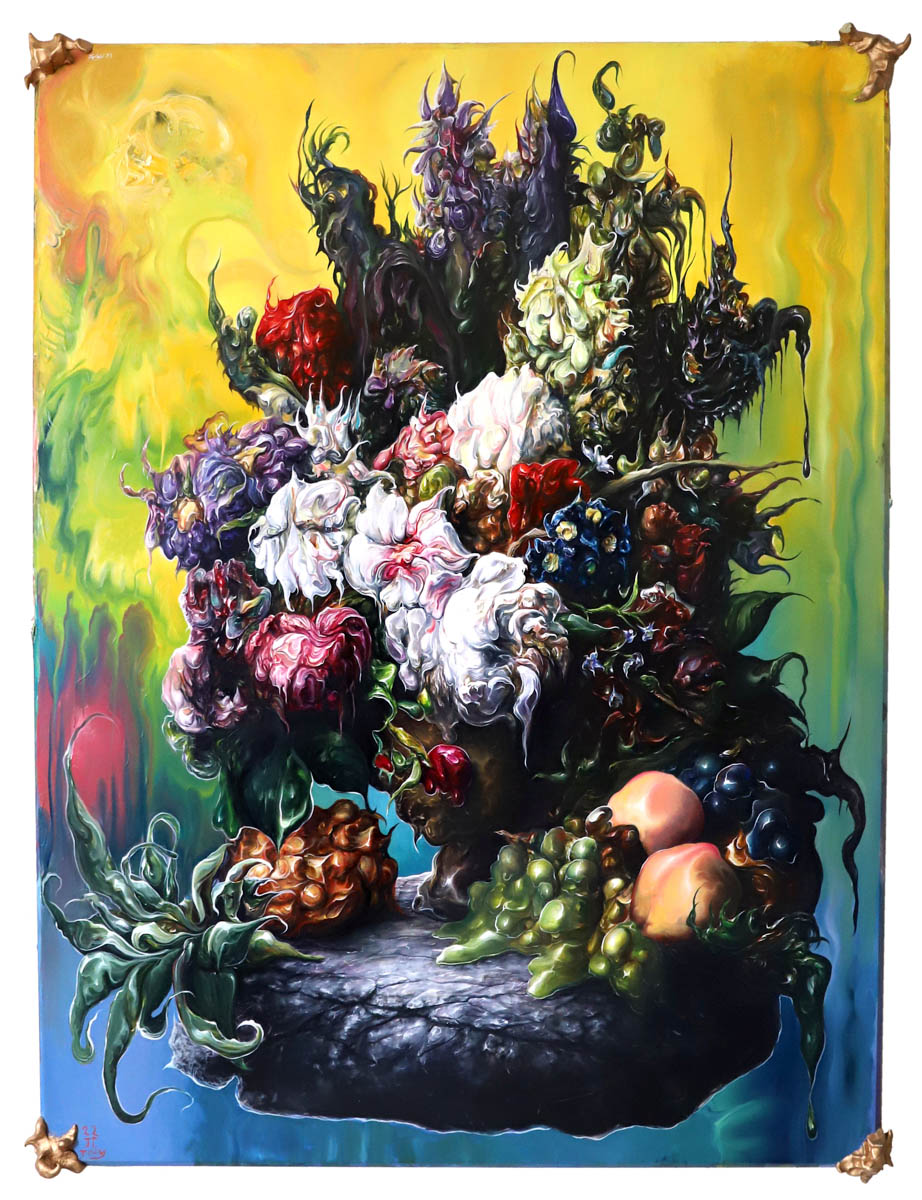
JOSH FOLEY, Notorious Fruit Flower Tableau, 2023, Oil acrylic and mixed media on board 120 x 90 cm- Private Collection

=== Music ===
Adjacent to the development of his painting: Foley, taught himself how to play the guitar, piano, drums and continues to delve into music theory and experiments in sound. This with the intention to extend his creative capacities to the realm of sound. To conceptualize his sonic activities as distinct from his visual ones - Foley created the alter-ego Xydep Xydahlia, *(imagined as an alien from the fictional planet Xylos) to present his music and when performing in a musical context. After, performing his experimental compositions at art openings and occasionally at live music venues Foley's music found a greater audience when he performed at MONA FOMA in 2020. Foley's performance was staged within his large scale installation Calculating Infinity, at QVMAG, just before COVID-19 broke out around the world, and encouraged record attendance to the museum.

=== Public art ===
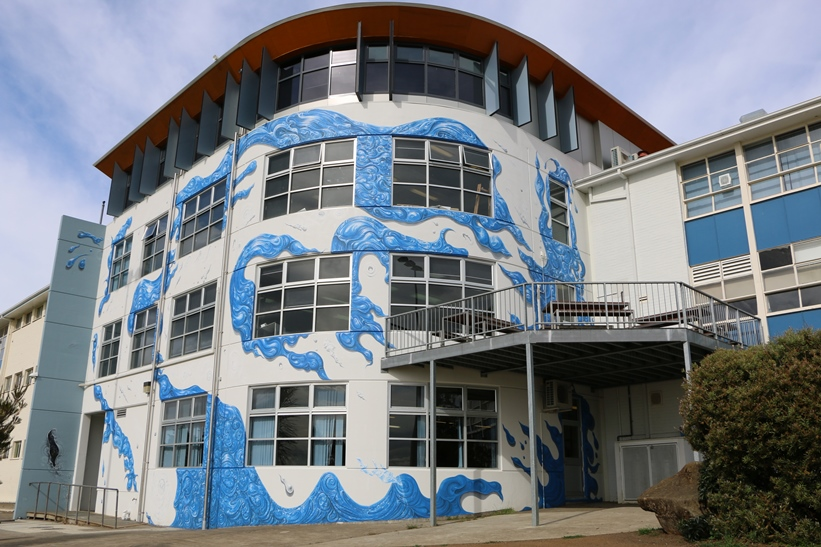
Foley, Josh International Orange, Exterior paint on wall approx. 297 Sq.m, 2016- Collection Taroona High School, Hobart, TAS.

In addition to his easel based work, Foley has completed a series of large scale public art commissions around Tasmania; one of the more significant of these was for Taroona High School, south of Hobart; called "International Orange"; this mural is on the banks of the Derwent River. Commissioned in 2015 through the Tasmanian Government's Public Art Site Scheme, the large-scale work covers a four-storey building and draws inspiration from the river's natural elements, emphasizing themes of fluidity, movement, and reflection. In 2021, Foley created a large mural at the Launceston Leisure and Aquatic Centre depicting Olympic gold medalist swimmer Ariarne Titmus, for Nike, Inc. one of her sponsors.

== Critical Perspectives ==
Foley's work has been influential and widely discussed throughout the Australian and increasingly International Art community. His innovative work, has been appraised by important critics and museum directors, curated into iconic group exhibitions creating dynamic conversation and provoking debate. Some of this is quoted below:

Anthony Bond OAM, who at the time, was Head of International Art at the Art Gallery of New South Wales, and chief judge of the Glover Prize when Foley won in 2011, said of Foley's work: "...it's talking about the whole history of the conventions of Western painting."

Francis E Parker, Curator – Exhibitions, Monash University Museum of Art (MUMA), nominating Foley, as an artist to watch on the ArtsHUB forum, said:

"It’s hard to comprehend in reproduction, but Josh Foley often creates a simulation of impasto in a totally flat surface, like a kind of trompe l’œil, so passages that look loose and spontaneous are actually the result of meticulous work. That kind of contradiction fascinates me. Being from just outside of Launceston myself, I also detect a Tasmanian sensibility in some of his paintings."

Elli Walsh, writing in Artist Profile magazine, about Josh's 2021 exhibition: The Spectre of Volatile Appearances, in Hobart at Despard Gallery offered:

"Foley’s most recent body of work responds to the state of hyper-saturation which characterises our informational and affective lives in the present. Many of these paintings respond to distinctly contemporary stories, perceptive experiences and technologies; this is, in a sense, post-internet art, with the added irony of being carried out in the ‘analogue’ medium of paint."

== Personal life ==
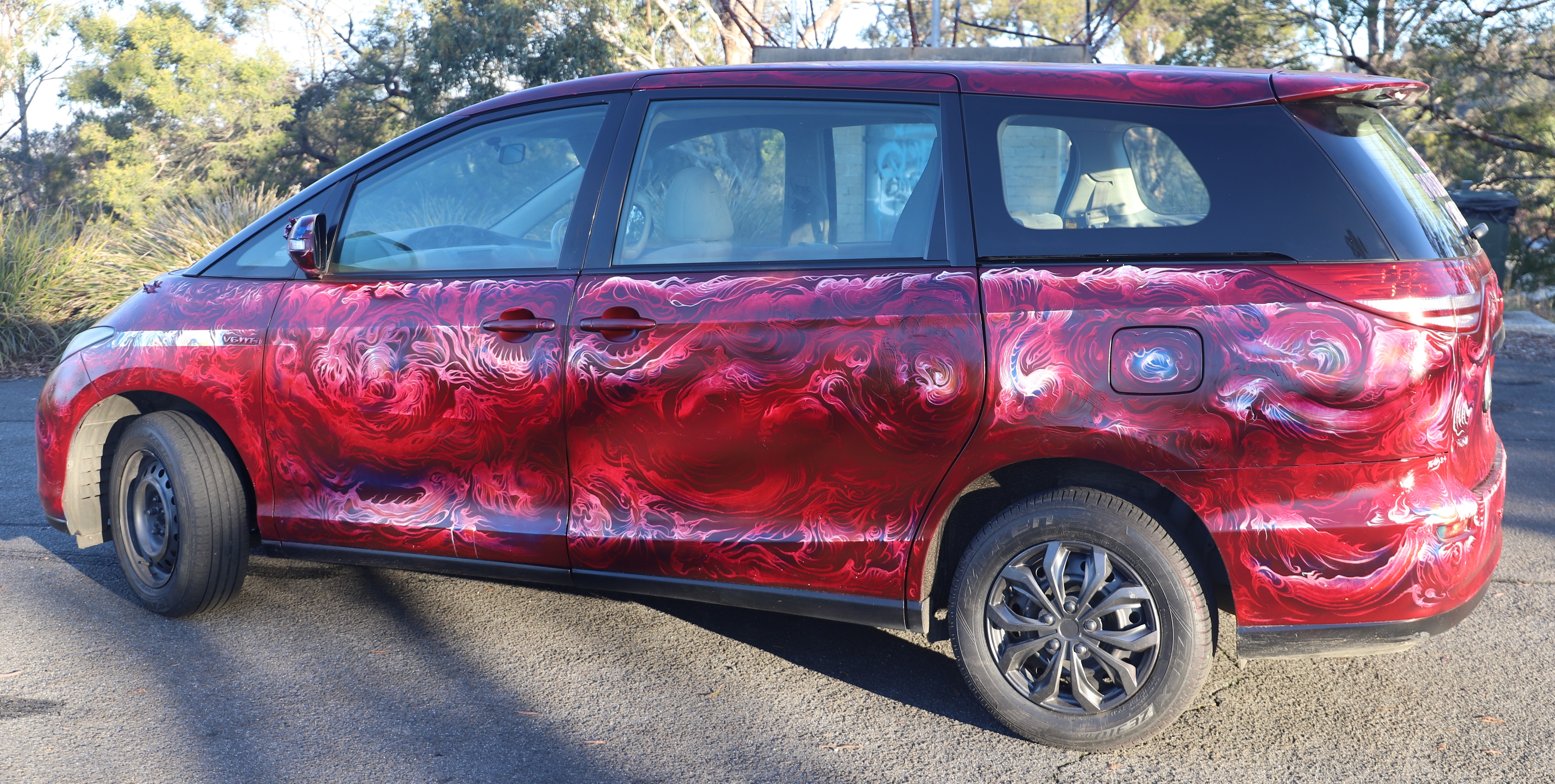

Foley has created a custom design on his 2007 Toyota Tarago, which features swirling psychedelic gestures of magenta and is a feature of the roads in the greater Launceston area. He describes, making this statement, to "...engage with audiences who are not so learned about art" and also because he "...is obsessed with painting on objects that have more than one surface."
