= List of newspapers in Tasmania =

This is a list of newspapers published in Tasmania in Australia through its history. From the founding as Van Dieman's Land, through the establishment of the Colony of Tasmania to the creation of a state of Australia as Tasmania in 1901 to the present day.

Newspaper	Town / suburb	Years of publication
Advertiser	Hobart	1837–1840
Advertiser: incorporating "Kingborough news"	Kingston	1964
Advocate	Burnie	1919–current
Auction Mart Advertiser and Commercial Register	Launceston	1863
Australasian Friend	Hobart	1887–?
Bagdad News	Bagdad	1899–?
Bagdad News	Bagdad	1997–1999
Bayside Village News	Sandy Bay	2002–2006
Bell's life in Tasmania a sporting chronicle, agricultural gazette, and country journal	Hobart	1859
Bent's News and Tasmanian Three-penny Register	Hobart	1836–1837
Binalong Bay Bulletin	Binalong Bay	1986–1989
Bothwell Banner	Bothwell	1994
Bothwell Bits	Bothwell	1983–1986
Bowen Gazette	Risdon Vale	1983–1984
Brighton Community News	Brighton	1999-current
Britannia and Trades Advocate	Hobart	1846–1851
Bruny News	Bruny Island	1980-current
Bugle	Launceston	2007
Burnie City News	Burnie	1994–1997
Campbell Town Chronicle	Campbell Town	1993–1996
Cape Country Courier	Smithton	1991–1993
Cape Country Independent	Wynyard	2007–2008
Catholic Magazine	Hobart	1916–1918
Catholic Standard	Hobart	1878–1894
Catholic Standard	Hobart	1921–1937
Central Coast Courier	Orford	1991–current
Central Coast Times	Burnie	2005–2007
Chigwell Claremont Free Press	Berridale	1986–1987
Church News	Hobart	1960–1995
Church News for the Diocese of Tasmania	Hobart	1862–1959
Circular Head Chronicle	Smithton	1906-2024
Clipper	Hobart	1893–1909
Coal River News	Richmond	1988–1995
Coastal Independent	Wynyard	2008
Coastal News and North Western Advertiser	Ulverstone	1890–1893
Coastal Times	Burnie	2008–2009
Collinsvale Crier	Collinsvale	1981–1996, 2002–2003
Colonial Advocate and Tasmanian Monthly Review and Register	Hobart	1828
Colonial Morning Advertiser and Colonial Maritime Journal	Hobart	1841–?
Colonial Times and Tasmanian Advertiser	Hobart	1825–1827
Colonial Times	Hobart	1828–1857
Colonist	Launceston	1888–1891
Colonist and the Van Diemen's Land Commercial and Agricultural Advertiser	Hobart	1832–1834
Cornwall Advertiser	Launceston	1855?–1877
Cornwall Chronicle	Launceston	1869–1871
Cornwall Chronicle: commercial, agricultural, and naval register	Launceston	1835–1880
Cornwell Press and Commercial Advertiser	Launceston	1829
Country Courier	Longford	1998–2025
Courier	Hobart	1840–1859
Courier	George Town	1961–1964
Cove Clarion	Hobart	1998–2000
Critic	Hobart	1904–1929
Critic	Hobart	1892–1893
Cygnet, Huon & Channel Classifieds	Cygnet	1986-current
Daily Post	Hobart	1908–1918
Daily Telegraph	Launceston	1883–1928
Day Star	Hobart	1886–1893?
Derby Echo	Derby	1978–2000
Derwent Clipper	Hobart	1977–1978
Derwent Star and Van Diemen's Land Intelligencer	Hobart	1810–1812
Derwent Valley Gazette (titled The Gazette from 2000 to 2017)	New Norfolk	1953–2024
Derwent Valley and Moonah News	Moonah and New Norfolk	1954
Devon Country Times	Devonport	1985–1990
Devon Herald, a bi-weekly journal of agriculture, politics and commerce	Latrobe	1877–1889
Devon News	Devonport	1962–1965
Devonport Times	Devonport	1998–2012
East Coast Bulletin	St. Helens	1989–1990
Eastern News	Bridport	1970–1972
Eastern Shore Spotlight	Rosny Park	1984
Eastern Shore Sun	Rosny	1988-current
Emu Bay Times and North West & West Coast Advocate	Burnie	1897–1899
Evening Mail	Hobart	1869
Evening News	Launceston	1894
Evening Star	Hobart	1845–1846
Examiner	Launceston	1842-current
Express	Launceston	1962–1966
Federalist	Hobart	1898–1899
Feral	Hobart	1973–1980
Flinders Island Chronicle	Flinders Island	1836–1837
Glenorchy City Gazette	Glenorchy	1990–1992
Glenorchy Gazette	Glenorchy	1993-current
Glenorchy Independent News: incorporating "Northern Suburbs News"	Glenorchy	1964–1966
Guardian, or, True Friend of Tasmania	Hobart	1847
Herald of Tasmania	Hobart	1827–1839
Highlands Digest	Bothwell	1994–current
Highland Herald	Bothwell	1994
Hobart Town Advertiser	Hobart	1839–1861
Hobart Town Advertiser (Weekly)	Hobart	1859–1865
Hobart Town Courier	Hobart	1827–1839
Hobart Town Courier	Hobart	1840–1859
Hobart Town Courier and Van Diemen's Land Gazette	Hobart	1839–1840
Hobart Town Daily Mercury	Hobart	1858–1860
Hobart Town Gazette and Van Diemen's Land Advertiser	Hobart	1821–1825
Hobart Town Gazette, and Southern Reporter	Hobart	1816–1821
Hobart Town Herald	Hobart	1845–1846
Hobart Town Herald	Hobart	1880–1881
Hobart Town Herald and Total Abstinence Advocate	Hobart	1846–1847
Hobart Town Herald, or, Southern reporter	Hobart	1846
Hobart Town Punch	Hobart	1867–1868
Hobart Town Punch	Hobart	1878
Hobarton Guardian, or, True Friend of Tasmania	Hobart	1847–1854
Hobarton Mercury	Hobart	1854–1857
Hub Newspaper	Penguin and Burnie	2005–2008
Huon & Derwent Times	Franklin	1933–1942
Huon News	Franklin	1964–1993
Huon Times	Franklin	1910–1933
Huon Valley News	Franklin	1993–current
Horton Herald	Hobart	1835–1838
Illustrated Tasmanian Mail	Hobart	1921–1935
Independent	Launceston	1831–1835
Irish Exile and Freedom Advocate	Hobart	1850–1851
Island News	Whitemark	1954–current
Jordan River Journal	Gagebrook	1982–1993
Journalists' Clarion	Hobart	1980
Kentish Chronicle	Sheffield	1994–2013
Kentish Times	Sheffield	1978–1994
Kentish Voice	Railton and Sheffield	2013–current
King Island Courier	Currie	1984–current
King Island News	Currie	1912–1986
Kingborough Chronicle: connecting our community and business	Kingston	2009–current
Kingston & Channel Mail	Sandy Bay	2003
Kingston Classifieds	Cygnet	Current
Land incorporating "The Critic"	Hobart	1924–1925
Launceston Advertiser	Launceston	1829–1846
Launceston Advertiser	Launceston	1986–1987
Launceston Courier	Launceston	1840–1843
Launceston Examiner: commercial and agricultural advertiser	Launceston	1842–1899
Launceston Sun	Launceston	1972
Launceston Times and Auction Mart Advertiser	Launceston	1864–1869
Leven Leader: the weekly news for the district of Ulverstone	Ulverstone	1992
Leven Lever	Ulverstone	1919–1920
Lilydale Progressive	Lilydale	1980–current
Luina News	Luina	1976–1984
Meander Valley Gazette	Deloraine	2014–current
Mercury	Hobart	1860–current
Mersey Valley Observer	Devonport	1992–1993
Midlander	Oatlands	1987–2001
Midlands Monthly	Oatlands	1979–1987
Monitor	Launceston	1895–1920
Monotone Sporting Record	Hobart	1914–1931
Morning Star and Commercial Advertiser	Hobart	1834–1835
Mount Lyell Standard & Strahan Gazette: a record of the mining fields of the West coast of Tasmania	Queenstown	1896–1902
New Norfolk and Derwent Valley News	New Norfolk	2020-current
New Standard	Hobart	1977–1994
News	Hobart	1924–1925
News of the Midlands	Longford	2026-
Norfolk Plains Gazette: serving the Longford, Perth and Cressy districts	Longford	1992–1996
North Coast Standard, a newspaper for the north-west coast	Latrobe	1891–1892
North & Coast Post	Launceston	2023–current
North West Post	Formby	1887–1916
North West Post : your independent weekly	Ulverstone	1999
North Western Advocate	Devonport	1899
North Western Advocate (Devonport) and the Emu Bay Times (Burnie) Tasmania	West Devonport and Burnie	1899–1919
North Western Chronicle	Latrobe	1887–1888
North-eastern Advertiser	Scottsdale	1909-current
Northern Midlands Gazette	Longford	1997–1998
Northern Scene	Launceston	1978–1983
Northern Standard	Ulverstone	1921–1923
Northern Suburbs News: the voice of the northern suburbs	Moonah	1961–1963
Oatlands News	Oatlands	1992–1993
Observer and Van Diemen's Land Journal of Politics, Agriculture, Commercial and General Intelligence	Hobart	1845–1846
Omnibus: a merchant's, tradesman's, auctioneer's, and general advertiser and shipping gazette	Hobart	1842–1864
People's Advocate, or, True friend of Tasmania	Launceston	1855–1856
People's Friend: official organ of the Tasmanian Temperance Alliance and the temperance societies of Tasmania	Hobart	1886–1936?
Peoples' Horn Boy	Hobart	1834
Progress: the popular advertiser	Launceston	1937
Quamby Whisper : informing the Westbury Municipality	Westbury	1990–1995
Reporter	Hobart	1864
Rossarden Mountain Re-echo	Rossarden	1991–2013
Saturday Evening Express	Launceston	1924–1962
Saturday Evening Mercury	Hobart	1954–1984
South Briton and Tasmanian Literary Journal	Hobart	1843
Southern Star	Hobart	1882–1883
Southern Star	Hobart	1985–1998
Southern Times	Bellerive	1999–2000
Spec News	Carlton River	1980–2000
Spectator and V.D.L. Gazette	Hobart	1844–1847?
Sporting News and Axemen's Journal	Launceston	1901–1902
Standard	Sandy Bay	1995–2005
Standard: Tasmania's Catholic newspaper	Hobart	1937–1971
Standard of Tasmania	Hobart	1851
Star	Hobart	1933
Star	Hobart	1997–1998
Sun Coast News	St. Helens	1980–1989
Sunbeams	Hobart	1896–1899
Suncoast News and Bulletin	St. Helens	1990–1992
SunCoast News	St. Helens	1993–2005
Sunday Examiner	Launceston	1984–current
Sunday Examiner Express	Launceston	1966–1984
Sunday Tasmanian	Hobart	1984–current
Tamar Courier	George Town	1964
Tamar Times	Launceston	1972
Tasman Gazette: Tasman Peninsula Community Newspaper	Tarrana	1979–current
Tasmania Free Press	Hobart	1975–1977
Tasmanian	Launceston	1871–1895
Tasmanian Automobile Trade Journal	Hobart	1930–1951
Tasmanian Catholic Standard	Hobart	1867–1872
Tasmanian Catholic Standard	Hobart	1876–1888
Tasmanian Colonist	Hobart	1851–1855
Tasmanian Country	Hobart	1980–current
Tasmanian Country Life	Launceston	1976
Tasmanian Countrywoman	Hobart	1947–1972
Tasmanian Daily News	Hobart	1855–1858
Tasmanian Democrat	Launceston	1891–1898
Tasmanian Farmer	Launceston	1937–1976
Tasmanian Farmer and Grazier	Launceston	1976–1979
Tasmanian Farmer	Launceston	1998–current
Tasmanian Leader	Hobart	1855–?
Tasmanian Licensed Victuallers Gazette	Hobart	1905–1910
Tasmanian Mail	Hobart	1877–1921
Tasmanian Mail	Launceston	1978–1979
Tasmanian Morning Herald : with which is incorporated 'The Advertiser'	Hobart	1865–1867
Tasmanian Motor News	Launceston	1953–1985
Tasmanian News	Hobart	1883–1911
Tasmanian Punch	Hobart	1866–?
Tasmanian Punch	Hobart	1869–1870
Tasmanian Punch	Hobart	1877
Tasmanian Punch	Launceston	1877–1879
Tasmanian Telegraph a weekly journal of agriculture and commerce, of municipal, social, and colonial progress	Hobart	1858–1859
Tasmanian Times	Hobart	1867–1870
Tasmanian Tribune	Hobart	1872–1879
Tasmanian, and Port Dalrymple Advertiser	Launceston	1825
Tasmanian Weekly Dictator	Hobart	1839
Tasmanian Weekly News	Hobart	1858
Tassie Digger	Hobart	1919–1921?
Tassie Times	Western Front	1916–1918
Teetotal Advocate	Launceston	1843
Telegraph	Launceston	1881–1883
Togatus	Hobart	1931-current
Town and country post	Dunalley	2005
Tribune	Hobart	18??–1879
True Catholic. Tasmanian Evangelical Miscellany	Hobart	1843–?
True Colonist: Van Diemen's Land Political Dispatch And Agricultural And Commercial Advertiser	Hobart	1834–1844
Trumpeter	Hobart	1833–1850
Ulverstone Herald	Ulverstone	1974
Ulverstone Post	Ulverstone	1998–1999
Valley and East Coast Voice	St. Marys	1971–current
Valley Voice	St. Marys	1968–1969
Van Diemen's Land Gazette and General Advertiser	Hobart	1814
Van Diemen's Land Chronicle	Hobart	1841
Van Diemen's Land Monthly Magazine	Hobart	1835
Voice	Hobart	1927–1953
Waratah Whispers	Waratah	1981–1989
Weekender	Burnie	1968–1976, 1987–1992
Weekly Courier	Launceston	1901–1935
Weekly News	Hobart	1868–1869
Weekly Times	Hobart	1863
Wellington Times and Agricultural and Mining Gazette	Burnie	1890–1897
West Coast Chronicle: the people's paper	Zeehan	2008–2009
West Coast Miner	Queenstown	1975–1978
West Coaster: serving Western Tasmania	Queenstown	1964–1968
Western Echo	Queenstown	2021–current
Western Herald	Rosebery	1992–2013
Western Tiers	Mole Creek	1980–2004
Westerner	Queenstown	1979–1995
The World	Hobart	1918–1924
Zeehan and Dundas Herald	Zeehan	1890–1922

== See also ==
- List of newspapers in Australia
