= Mount Lyell Standard & Strahan Gazette =

Former newspaper published in Tasmania

The Mount Lyell Standard was a Queenstown based newspaper in Western Tasmania, that was contemporaneous with the Zeehan and Dundas Herald. It was also known as the Mount Lyell Standard & Strahan gazette. The newspaper operated between 1896 and 1902.

The newspaper was quoted about developments in the mining operations in other newspapers. The newspaper was involved in court actions in 1902 and 1903.

Editorial banners included Shakespearean quotes - such as:

Be just and fear not
Let all the ends thou aim at be thy Country's
Thy God's, and Truth's

— Shakespeare

It was notable for carrying material related to the early Australian politician King O'Malley.

Extracts from the paper, which was being published at a very busy time on the west coast, have been reprinted at various stages to reflect the conditions of the community.

== See also ==
- List of newspapers in Tasmania
