= The Critic (Hobart) =

Newspaper in Tasmania, Australia

The Critic was a weekly newspaper published in Hobart, Tasmania, from c. 1904 to 1924 or later.

== History ==
In 1902 Edward Mulcahy, Minister of Lands in the Tasmanian government, sued James Paton, proprietor and editor, and Gerald Tempest Massey, printer and publisher of Hobart's "pungent" Clipper newspaper, for defamation of character, in respect of an article alleging impropriety in awarding a contract for the Strahan storm water channel.

Paton left for the goldfields of Western Australia, becoming Morning Herald representative in Bunbury, then editor of the Murchison Advocate, confusingly taking the chair vacated by (the unrelated) John Paton, who had left for Johannesburg. One report says both men had been associated with the Clipper.

Massey disposed of The Clipper to Walter Alan Woods, and founded The Critic. In 1904 he was joined briefly by Paton, who then moved to Perth, to become first editor of the left-wing Democrat, which lost money from the outset, and Paton (who advocated increased borrowing and pressing on) was sacked. In 1905 he joined the Perth Morning Herald. He later decamped for South Africa with a female staffer from Democrat days, leaving his wife Martha Ann "Mattie" Deane, née Davis, to organise a divorce.

The paper was published and printed by

- Gerald T. Massey, at 64 Collins Street, Hobart, Tasmania to November 1917. He was previously editor and publisher of The Clipper.
- Ernst Henry Newman, for "The Critic" Pty Ltd, at 135 Collins Street, Hobart, Tasmania. from December 1917.

== Digitization ==
The National Library of Australia has digitized microfilm copies of The Critic from Volume 2, issue 75 of 5 January 1907 to Volume 69, issue=989, of 19 September 1924, accessible online via Trove.
