= The Mercury (Hobart) =

Daily newspaper in Tasmania, Australia

- Front page of The Mercury on 9 December 2006
- Type: Daily newspaper
- Format: Tabloid
- Owner: News Corp Australia
- Editor: Craig Herbert
- Founded: 1854
- Language: English
- Headquarters: Hobart, Tasmania, Australia
- Circulation: 44,317 (Weekdays); 61,020 (Saturday); 58,148 (Sunday)
- ISSN: 1039-9992
- Website: www.themercury.com.au

The Mercury is a daily newspaper, published in Hobart, Tasmania, Australia by News Corp Australia. The weekend issues of the paper are called Mercury on Saturday and The Sunday Tasmanian.

== History ==
The newspaper was founded on 5 July 1854 by George Auber Jones and John Davies. Two month John Davies became the sole owner. It was then published twice weekly and known as the Hobarton Mercury. It rapidly expanded, absorbing its rivals, and became a daily newspaper in 1858 under the lengthy title The Hobart Town Daily Mercury. In 1860 the masthead was reduced to The Mercury and in 2006 it was further shortened to simply Mercury.

With the imminent demise of the Daily Telegraph, The Mercury, from March 1928, used the opportunity to increase their penetration there by expanding the branch office in Launceston, and by putting on "fast cars" to get the paper to Launceston by breakfast.

After Davies' retirement in 1871, the business was carried on by his sons John George Davies and Charles Ellis Davies who later traded as Davies Brothers Limited. John Davies died on 11 June 1872, aged 58. The company remained in the family's hands until 1986 when the Herald & Weekly Times (HWT) acquired majority ownership. In 1988 News Limited acquired the HWT, and then the remaining minority interests.

The Saturday Evening Mercury, known locally as the SEM was printed and circulated for readers on a Saturday evening from 1954 to 1984, it was replaced in early 1984 by the Sunday Tasmanian which still exists today. Other Tasmanian titles published by the company were the weekly rural newspaper Tasmanian Country and the weekly regional newspaper Derwent Valley Gazette which were acquired from independent publishers in the early 1980s. Both were sold to public relations firm Font PR in 2020. From 1987–2007 Davies Brothers published the monthly travel magazine Treasure Islander.

At various stages in its history there have been limited experiments with regional papers—such as The Westerner which succeeded the West Coast Miner in 1979 to serve the West Coast until its demise in 1995—as well as suburban newspapers for the Hobart market, which appeared in various guises from 1966 until 1998. In November 2006 the company launched what it called a "newspaper in a newspaper" the Kingborough Times which appeared monthly within the Sunday Tasmanian. This was followed in June 2007 by the Northern Times with news from Hobart's northern suburbs. Both inserts have since ceased publication.

== Editors ==
The following people were editors of The Mercury:

Order	Name	Commencement date	Term ended	Term of office	Reference
1	William Coote	1854	1857	2–3 years	
2	Samuel Prout Hill	1857	1861	3–4 years	
3	Thomas Lockyer Bright	1854	1857	0–1 years	
4	James Allen	1865	1865	0 years	
(3)	Thomas Lockyer Bright	1865	1868	2–3 years	
5	John Donnellan Balfe	1868	1868	0 years	
6	James C. Patterson	1868	1868	0 years	
7	James Simpson	1868	1883	14–15 years	
8	Henry Richard Nicholls	1883	1912	28–29 years	
9	William Henry Simmonds	1912	1931	18–19 years	
10	Frederick Usher	1931	1943	11–12 years	
11	Charles Ellis "C. E." Davies	1944	1954	11–12 years	
12	Roy E. Shone	1954	1970	15–16 years	
13	Dennis Newton Hawker	1970	1982	11–12 years	
14	T. C. Malcolm Williams	1982	1984	1–2 years	
15	James "Jim" Burns	1984	1986	1–2 years	
16	Barry Dargaville	1986	1988	1–2 years	
17	Ian McCausland	1988	2001	12–13 years	
18	Garry Bailey	November 2001	5 January 2012	10 years, 65 days	
19	Andrew Holman	January 2012	January 2014	1–2 years	
20	Matt Deighton	January 2014	25 October 2017	3 years, 276 days	
21	Chris Jones	25 October 2017	13 January 2020	2 years, 80 days	
22	Jenna Cairney	13 January 2020	28 October 2021	1 year, 288 days	
22a	Brad Petersen (acting)	28 October 2021	30 January 2022	94 days	
23	Craig Warhurst	31 January 2022	4 July 2023	1 year, 154 days	
23a	Brad Petersen (acting)	5 July 2023	17 July 2023	13 days	
24	Craig Herbert	18 July 2023	current		

== Press operations ==
In July 2007 News Corporation approved a new $31 million press centre for Davies Brothers Pty Ltd, publisher of the Mercury and the Sunday Tasmanian, including the installation of the latest colour press.

Davies Brothers opened the new print centre at the Tasmanian Technopark in Dowsing Point, north of Hobart, in 2009. A new KBA Comet four-colour press replaced the 35-year-old Goss Urbanite press that had been housed in the Argyle Street wing of the company's city site. Other operations of the newspaper group continued to be based in the heart of the city at 93 Macquarie Street.

The success of the new centre soon saw the introduction of local printing of interstate titles for local distribution. This includes the national daily The Australian and Melbourne's Herald Sun.

The June 2024 closure of the state's only other major newspaper printing plant - Australian Community Media’s Rocherlea Print Centre - in Launceston resulted in the printing and distribution of titles such as The Examiner and The Advocate and local editions of The Age and Australian Financial Review being transferred to the Mercury Print Centre. The weekly rural title Tasmanian Country returned to the Mercury Print Centre after previously being moved to the ACM site by its new owner after that paper's sale by News Corp Australia to FontPR.

== Locations ==
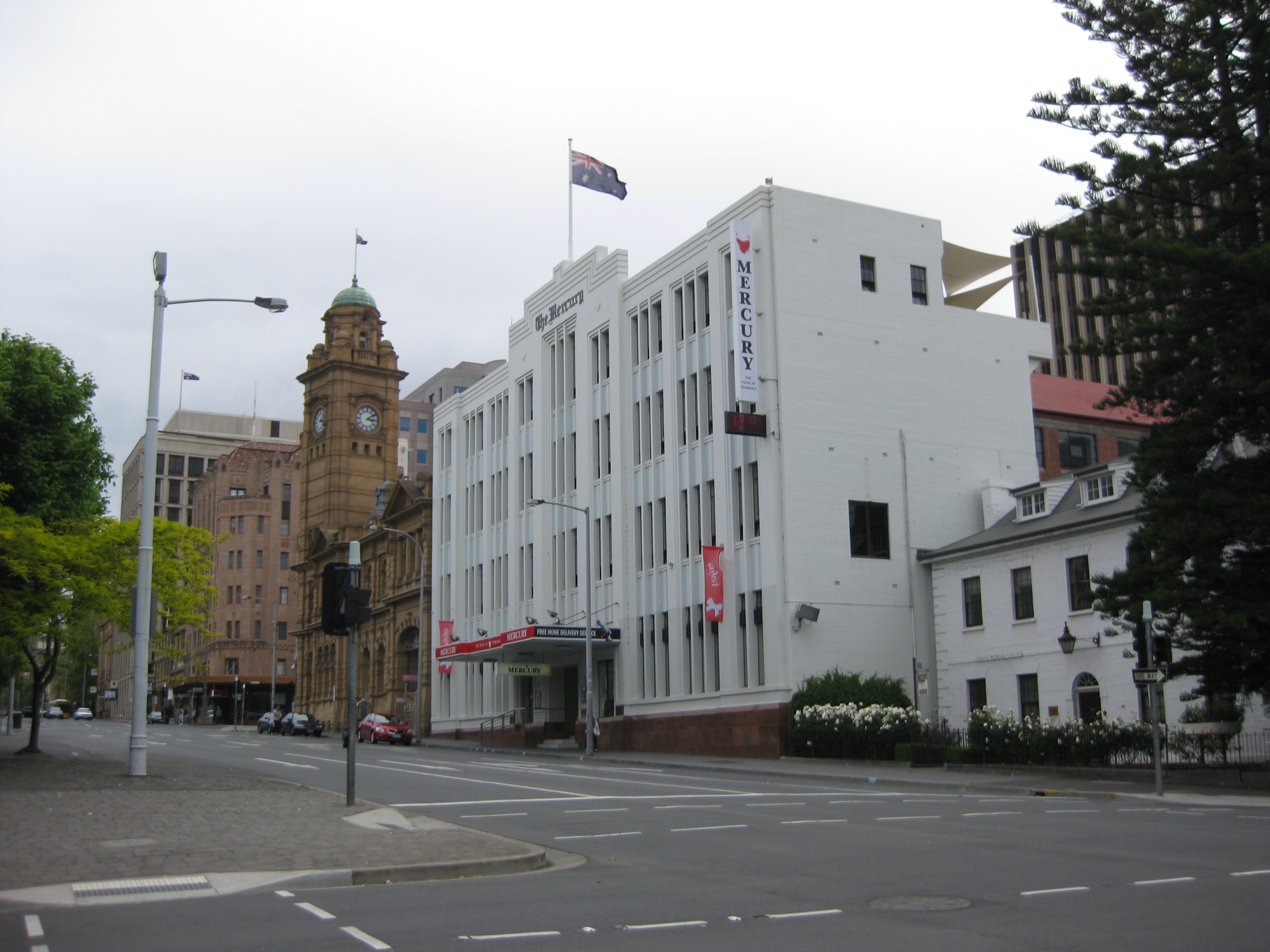
The former Mercury building at 91-93 Macquarie Street, Hobart

In November 2011 Davies Brothers chief executive officer Rex Gardner announced that the company would move from its landmark Macquarie Street headquarters in August 2012, leasing a new office at 2 Salamanca Square. The move took place over the weekend of 28–29 July 2012, although months of work had taken place in advance.

The company has branch offices in Launceston and Burnie, as well as its print centre at Dowsing Point and its distribution centre at Western Junction near Launceston. Its branch office at New Norfolk closed in December 2010. An office in William St, Queenstown closed in the early 1990s.

It was announced in May 2013 that the original site had been sold to an unidentified buyer including the heritage-listed Ingle Hall, which was built in 1814 and housed the Mercury Print Museum. The Macquarie Street and Argyle Street frontages of the Mercury building were heritage listed in 2012 Later in 2013, the purchasers were identified as Penny Clive and her husband Bruce Neill. Their intent was to transform it into restaurants, art galleries and a creative industries hub. It is now used for a restaurant and the Detached Artist Archive, a private gallery.

From early 2013, the Mercury's Salamanca Square office hosted the Tasmanian bureaus of The Australian and Sky News. The Mercury's Hobart offices have also hosted the Tasmanian bureau of Australian Associated Press over many decades. In 2018, the University of Tasmania opened its Tasmanian Media School, co-located with the Mercury in its Salamanca Square office.

In February 2022, the Mercury relocated to an internal office on the ground floor of the same Salamanca Square building it had occupied since 2012. A fraction of the space it once occupied on the floor above, it was the first time the company's offices did not have a street frontage. It continues to host the local bureau of Sky News.

== Circulation and readership ==
As of March 2011, the Mercury reported its Monday–Friday circulation as 44,317 with an average readership of 107,000 and its Saturday circulation as 61,020 with readership of 146,000. The Sunday Tasmanian reported circulation of 58,148 with readership of 129,000.

== The Tasmanian Mail ==
The Tasmanian Mail was a weekly newspaper published by The Mercury from July 1877 to June 1935. It employed a separate staff from that which brought out the Mercury, and was intended to cover the whole of the state. From 7 April 1921 it was published as The Illustrated Tasmanian Mail.

The following people were editors of the Mail:

Order	Name	Commencement date	Term ended	Term of office	Reference
1	James Patterson	June 1877	TBC		
2	? Davies	TBC	TBC		
3	F. Humphries	TBC	TBC		
4	F. Carrington	TBC	TBC		
5	Charles James Fox	1883	June 1888	4–5 years	
6	G. B. Edwards	1888	TBC		
7	F. W. Moore	TBC	TBC		
8	G. E. Langridge	TBC	TBC		
9	J. M. Day	TBC	TBC		
10	David Black	TBC	TBC		
11	Ronald Smith	TBC	TBC		
12	Edwin Ings	TBC	TBC		
13	P. H. Thurston	TBC	TBC		
14	Fred Usher	TBC	1922		
15	Constance Cummins	1922	1931	8–9 years	
16	J. E. Thorp	1931	1935	3–4 years	

== Endorsements ==
National election	Endorsement	
2010		Labor
2013		Coalition
2016		Coalition
2019	No endorsement	
2022	No endorsement	
2025	No endorsement	

== See also ==
- List of newspapers in Tasmania
