= Orr Street =

Main street of Queenstown, Tasmania

Orr Street Tasmania
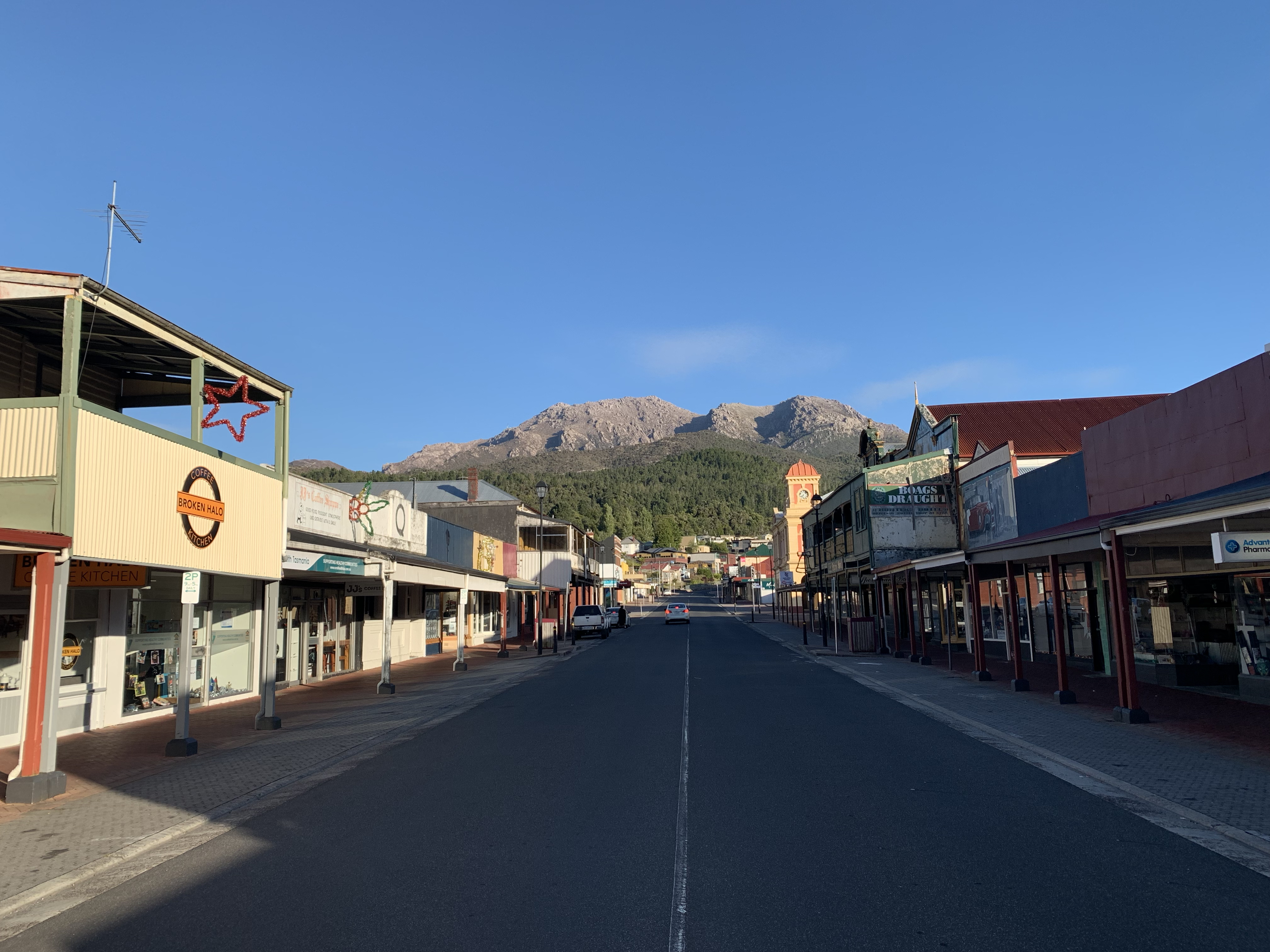
- Looking east up Orr Street, Queenstown (2022)

General information
- Type: Street
- Location: Queenstown

Major junctions
- West end: Driffield Street / Lyell Highway
- East end: Terminus near Mount Owen

Location(s)
- Suburb(s): Queenstown

Orr Street is the main street of Queenstown, a mining town on the west coast of the island state of Tasmania, Australia. The street runs east–west through the town centre and is noted for its historic streetscape, heritage buildings, and views toward Mount Owen.

== History ==
Orr Street was constructed and in use by 1901, when it already featured operating banks, hotels, and commercial offices. The street was named after William Orr (1843–1929), one of the early investors in the Mount Lyell mine. Among the most prominent buildings on the street is the Empire Hotel, completed in 1901 at the western end.

The street remained a commercial centre for much of the 20th century, though activity declined with the downturn of the Mount Lyell copper mine during the 1990s. Many original buildings remain, although most no longer serve their initial commercial or civic purposes.

At the western junction, Orr Street meets Driffield Street, which links to the Lyell Highway. The original Queenstown railway station, rail yards, and the line of the West Coast Wilderness Railway were located at the western end, providing the main connection with the outside world until the completion of road links such as the Lyell Highway and the Queenstown–Zeehan highway in the 1930s.

Orr Street also contains significant civic buildings. The Queenstown Post Office, located on the street, was built in 1902, with its prominent tower added in 1909.

Orr Street has been subject to periodic flooding. In April 1914, after a week of wet weather, heavy rain caused stormwater to overflow gutters and pour into shops on the southern side of the street, leaving floors covered with mud and silt. Further flooding was recorded in December 1938, when the street was again inundated.

To mitigate stormwater issues, the Queenstown Council undertook works in 1915 to renew kerbing between Sticht and McNamara streets, widening gutters to improve water runoff and reduce flooding of adjoining shops.

In the 1930s the street underwent resurfacing and improvements. In 1936 the Queenstown Municipal Council introduced bitumenising works and used a newly purchased diesel roller for reconstruction projects.

The street has also been a subject of cultural interest. In the 1930s the Queenstown Camera Club used Orr Street as a recurring subject for its photographic competitions.

Before bituminisation, the unsealed road surface required regular maintenance and resurfacing.

== Gallery ==
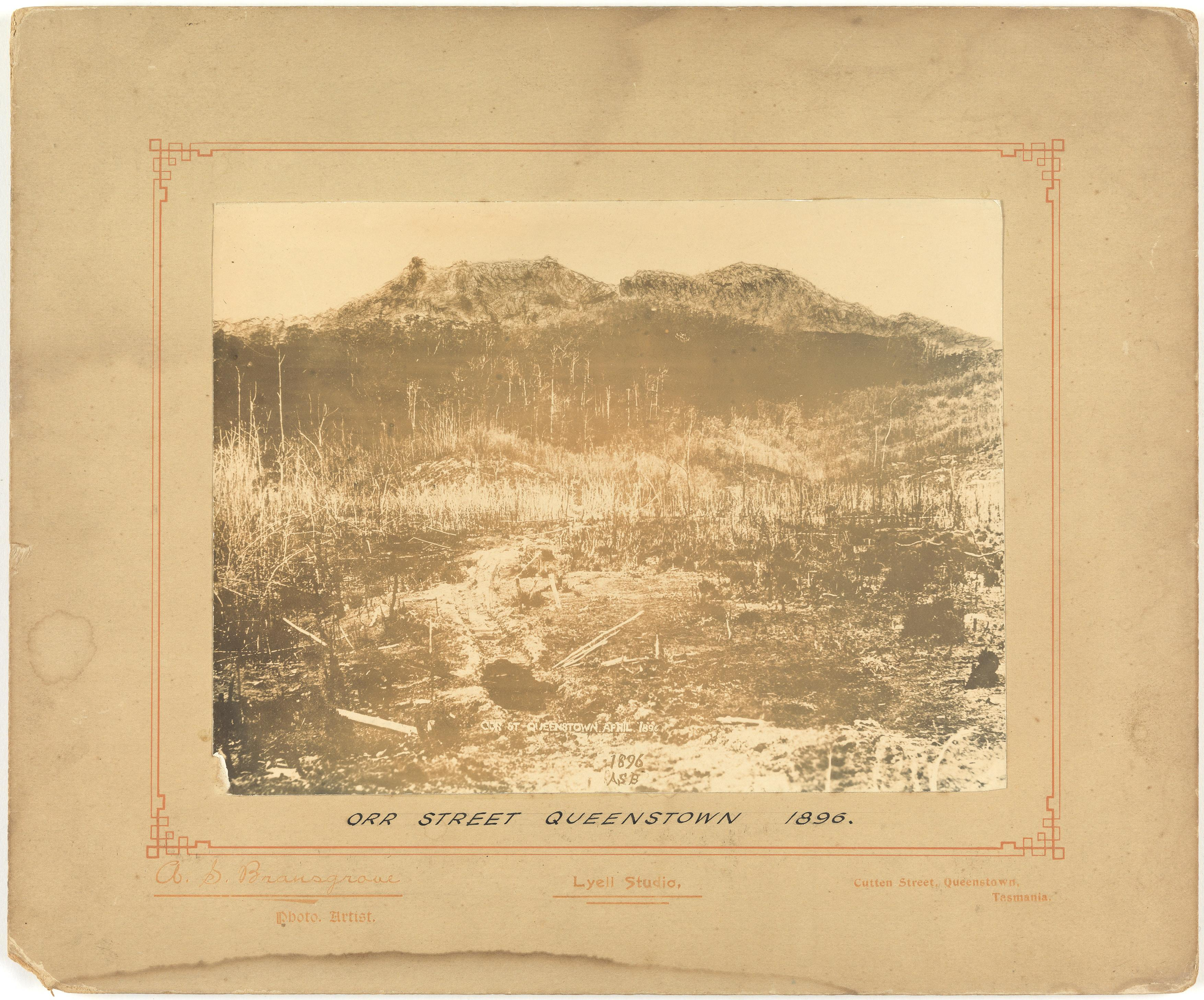
Orr Street, 1896

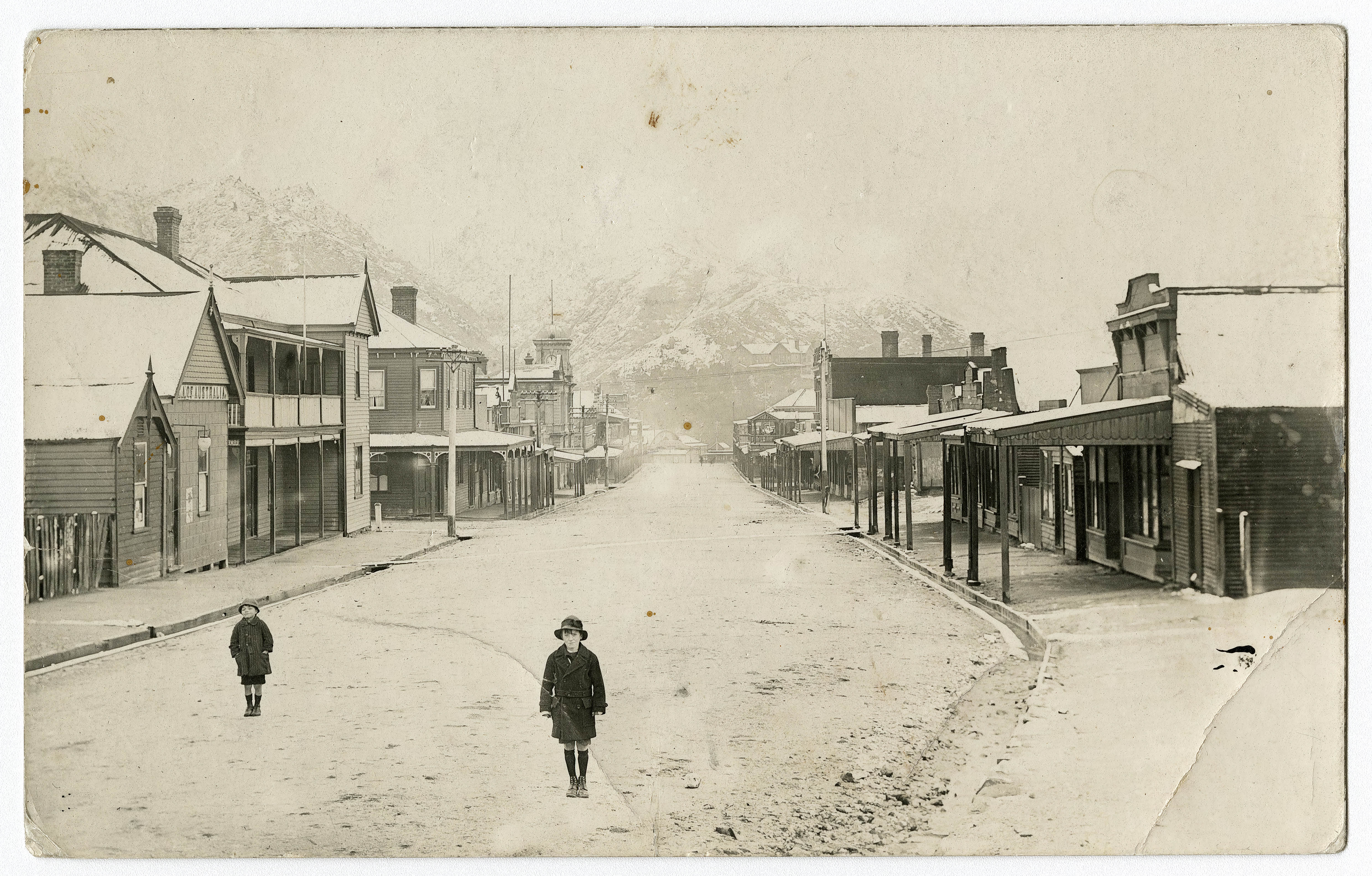
Snow in Orr Street, date unknown

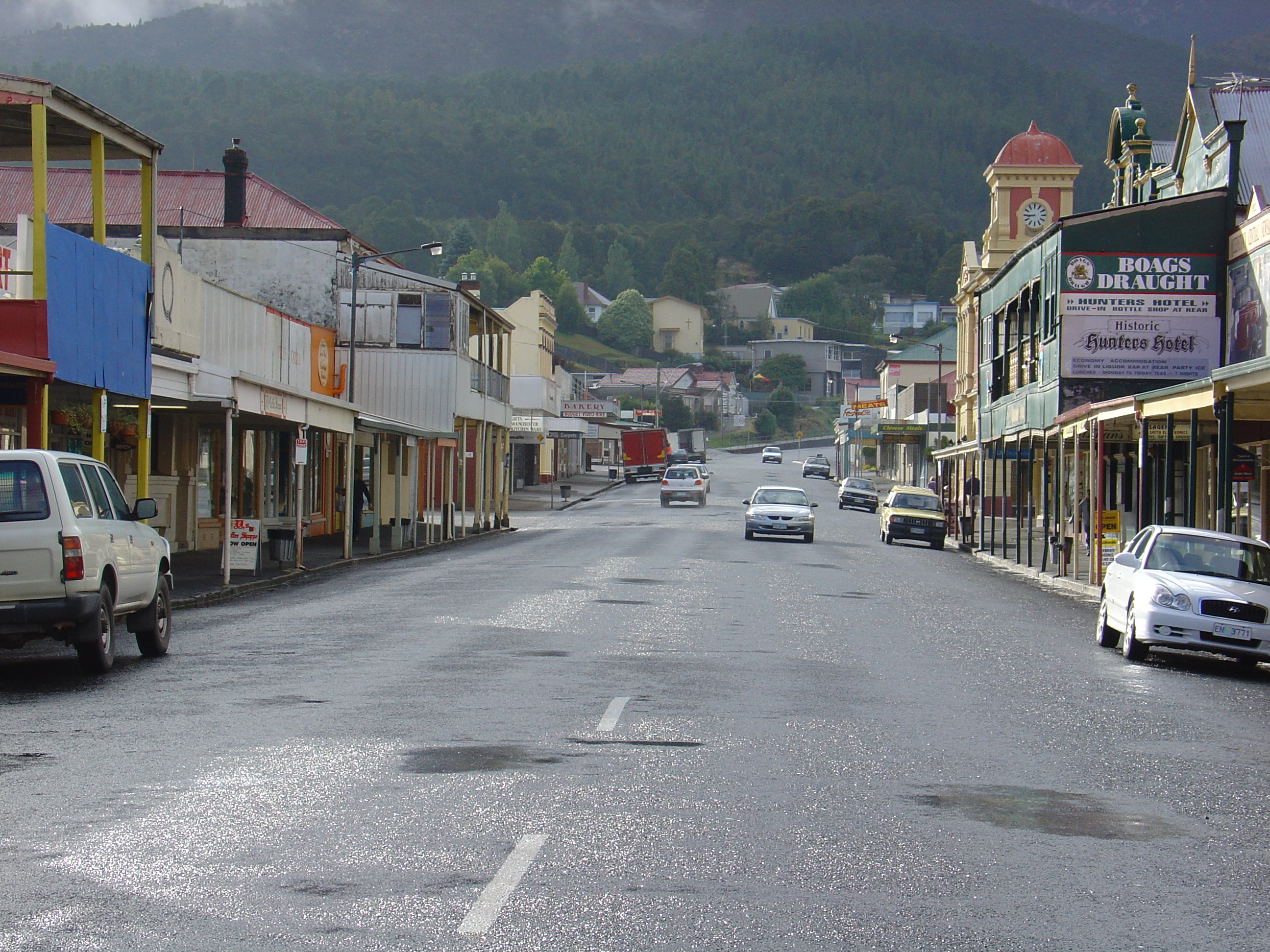
Looking east up Orr Street, with the post office tower, 2010
