= The West Coast Miner =

Newspaper, 1975–1978, Queenstown, Tasmania

The West Coast Miner was a fortnightly newspaper for the West Coast Tasmanian community, based in Queenstown from December 1975 to 1978. It was originally funded by community arts funding from the Australian Commonwealth Government, and was housed at the Adult Education Office in Queenstown. Jim Nicholls and Jo Beams were the instigators of the project. The Mount Lyell Mining and Railway Company and Renison Limited supported the newspaper by distributing it to employees.

== Predecessors ==
It appears there were no locally produced newspapers on the west coast in the mid 20th century following the demise of the earlier newspapers. The Advocate of Burnie was the main external newspaper to carry west coast news stories.

== Successors ==
It was succeeded by The Westerner produced by The Mercury newspaper, which ran in various forms from 1979 to 1995.

Following this the Western Herald became the main west coast newspaper. It was one of many newspapers that have existed for relatively short times on the west coast, due to a range of issues.

== Duration ==
- No. 1 (30th Oct. 1975)-no. 79 (14th Dec. 1978)

== Earlier West Coast based newspapers ==
- The Mount Lyell Standard
- The Zeehan and Dundas Herald

== See also ==
- List of newspapers in Australia
