= W. H. Simmonds =

English newspaperman

William Henry Simmonds (c. 1860 – 19 September 1934) was an English newspaperman whose varied career took him finally to Tasmania, Australia, where he was editor of the Hobart Mercury for 18 years.

== Biography ==
Simmonds was born in Stourbridge, England and educated privately. His first experience in journalism was as reporter with a Birmingham daily. He became an assistant editor of The Yorkshire Post at age 25, then chief sub-editor of the Edinburgh Evening News. He spent some time in South Africa as assistant editor of the Cape Argus. While in South Africa he toured extensively, accompanying the High Commissioner Sir Henry Loch. He returned to England, where he was invited by W. T. Stead, to take the post of news editor with The Pall Mall Gazette, and subsequently London manager of the Cape Times.

He also worked as editor of various trade magazines and with the "Encyclopaedia and Great Books" section of Amalgamated Press, a "house" of the Harmsworth publishing empire.

He left for India, where he worked for The Statesman at Calcutta (Kolkata) for a time, then left for Australia, where he was engaged by the Brisbane Daily Mail, until that paper's reorganisation (around 1900–1910, not the 1915 shakeup). His next position was in New Zealand, where he served as editor of the Ashburton daily Guardian.

Simmonds returned to Australia at the invitation of Sir George Davies and C. E. Davies as editor of the Hobart Mercury, taking up his position in November 1912. In 1918 he was selected as member of an Australian press delegation, sponsored by the Imperial government, which toured America, Great Britain, France and Canada, to gain an appreciation of the British war effort. He served as editor of The Mercury for 18 years, retiring in 1930.

== Publications ==
Simmonds wrote The Boys' Book of the Sea and numerous short stories.

== Last days and death ==
Simmonds died at his home in Bellerive, Tasmania after suffering a heart attack on the Hobart wharf and subsequent brief illness. His remains were buried in the Church of England cemetery, Rokeby, Tasmania. Among the mourners were F. Usher, managing editor of The Mercury, J. E. Thorp, editor of The Illustrated Tasmanian Mail and C. B. Black, sub-editor of The Mercury.

== Family ==
In 1885 Simmonds married Amy Bloxham (c. 1860 – 11 June 1946), the daughter of C. W. Milnes Bloxham, M.D., of Halesowen, Worcester. They had four sons, all of whom enlisted in the Great War, and two daughters

- Hugh Henry Dawes Simmonds (1886 – 28 March 1952) was Native Commissioner in Rhodesia, now Zimbabwe. Died in Salisbury, Rhodesia (now Harare) as Major Simmonds CMG.
- Guy Simmonds (1888 – 1916) died in France as Lieut. Guy Simmonds.
- Roy Simmonds (1889 – 21 December 1939); died in London as Major Simmonds OBE, Croix de Guerre, Ordre de Leopold
- Dorothy Simmonds (1890–1984) married Maxwell Gordon Butcher on 20 December 1917; they lived in Hobart.
- Marjorie Edith Simmonds (1894? 1900?–1984) married Thomas George D'Emden of Hobart on 10 March 1921.
- Noel Simmonds (12 December 1896 – ), born in Leigh-on-Sea, Essex, married Naomi Ellis Ferrers Dean, daughter of Ellis Dean MLC, on 16 August 1922. They had a home in Hobart.

They had a home, "Wight Cottage" on York Street, Bellerive, Tasmania
