= Zeehan and Dundas Herald =

Former newspaper based in Zeehan, Tasmania

The Zeehan and Dundas Herald (also seen as Zeehan Dundas Herald) was a newspaper for the West Coast Tasmania community, based in Zeehan and Dundas from 1890 to 1922.

It was published by William Lawrence Calder and Joseph Bowden, with the National Library of Australia catalogue stating that the first issues was dated Tuesday, 14 October 1890 while Blainey in The Peaks of Lyell has October 1891.

Some notable people worked on the staff during the life of the newspaper; David John O'Keefe was editor between 1894 and 1899.

The technology acquired for the printing of the newspaper was, during publication, up to date and unique in being located outside of the main Hobart – Launceston city environments.

It ceased operating with volume 33, number 193, on 31 May 1922.

It was operating in the early years (1890s) at the same time as the Queenstown based Mount Lyell Standard, which ceased in 1902.

It reported extensively on the 1912 North Mount Lyell Disaster and the subsequent inquiry following the disaster.

Microform copies of the newspaper were made in the late twentieth century.

In the 2000s, family history enthusiasts have made copies of the newspapers birth, death and marriage entries for the full range of the newspapers existence.

Subsequent west coast newspapers did not appear until later in the 20th century following the decline in the fortunes of Zeehan and Dundas and the exhaustion of the silver deposits in particular.

== See also ==
- The West Coast Miner
- List of newspapers in Australia
