= The World (Hobart) =

Newspaper published in Hobart, Tasmania

Front page of the 2nd issue published on Tuesday 2 July 1918

The World was an Australian newspaper published in Hobart, Tasmania, from 1918 to 1925.

The World was affiliated with the Australian Labor Party and the Australian Workers' Union. It was one of a series of newspapers published by Labor Papers Limited, succeeding The Clipper and the Daily Post. Edmund Dwyer-Gray edited The World from 1918 to 1922.

The World has been digitised and is freely available at Trove.
