= Huon Times =

Australian newspaper

- Founded: February 16, 1910
- Language: English language
- Headquarters: Franklin, Tasmania, Australia

The Huon Times (1910–1933), later the Huon & Derwent Times (1933–1942), was an English language newspaper published in Franklin, Tasmania, Australia.

== History ==
The newspaper was first published on 16 February 1910 by Sydney Wentworth Addison the manager-editor of Huon Newspaper Co., Ltd. It was published bi-weekly until 1931 when it became a weekly newspaper.

In 1933 the name of the publication was changed to Huon & Derwent Times, and an additional section was included that targeted readership in the Derwent Valley region. Publication was suspended by the Board of Directors in 1942 in the misplaced hope that it would be reinstated at the resumption of peace.

== Digitisation ==
The Huon Times and the Huon & Derwent Times have been digitised as part of the Australian Newspapers Digitisation Program of the National Library of Australia.

== See also ==
- List of newspapers in Australia
- List of newspapers in Tasmania
