= The Paragon Theatre, Queenstown =

Historic entertainment venue in Queenstown, Tasmania, Australia

The Paragon Theatre
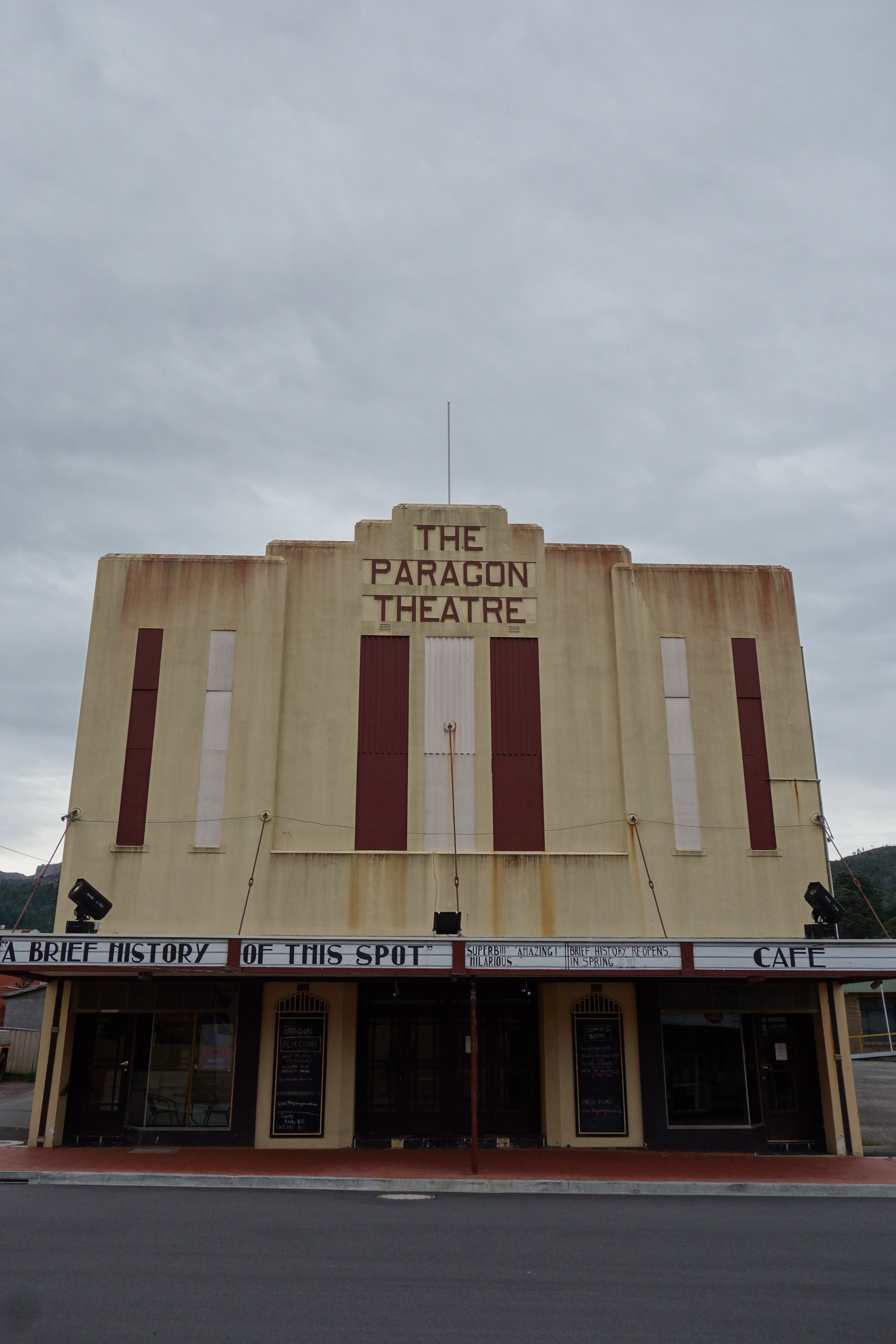
- The Paragon Theatre, Queenstown in 2013
- Interactive map of The Paragon Theatre
- Address: 11 McNamara Street; Queenstown, Tasmania; Australia
- Coordinates: 42°4′48.53″S 145°33′17.58″E
- Owner: Joy Chappell & Anthony Coulson
- Capacity: 1,150 (1933), 750 (1937), 850 (1966), 60 (2009)
- Current use: cinema, live entertainment

Construction
- Opened: 28 October 1933; 92 years ago
- Years active: 1933–1985, 2003–2015, 2017–present
- Architect: A. Lauriston Crisp

Website
- Official site

The Paragon Theatre is a historic cinema and live entertainment venue in Queenstown, Tasmania, Australia.

== History ==
Commissioned by the Paragon Picture Co Pty Ltd, the art deco theatre was constructed entirely with reinforced concrete by Carter & Peace. At a cost of over £A5,000, it was advertised as the “city theatre in the country” and was compared to Burnie's Municipal Theatre in design. The auditorium originally seated 1,150 patrons (750 in the stalls and 400 in the dress circle), which would accommodate for two-thirds of Queenstown's population in 2017. The Paragon Theatre opened as a "talkie theatre" on October 28, 1933, with She Done Him Wrong and Tiger Shark. It was also advertised as the Paragon Talkies in the years after opening. Exhibiting Hollywood films and local newsreels, The Paragon was in direct competition with the neighbouring 1890s Metropole Theatre and Capitol Theatre. In 1935, the Paragon was the first cinema in Tasmania to install Western Electric's "Wide Range" sound system.

The Paragon enjoyed capacity crowds until home videocassette recordings and video rental stores rose to prominence in the late 1970s. Theatre patronage declined and the venue was repurposed into an indoor cricket court in 1985. During this conversion, a new concrete floor was poured directly onto the original wooden floorboards. The original 35mm projectors were removed and are on display at the Galley Museum in Queenstown. Throughout the 1990s The Paragon was greatly unoccupied and became a target for vandals. Originally from Zimbabwe, local general practitioner Dr. Alex Stevenson bought The Paragon in 2003. Stevenson and his wife Alice spent five years renovating the theatre into a 60-seat luxury cinema, function venue and café. Part of their restoration included hand-painting the venue's striking floor. The Stevensons returned to Zimbabwe in 2012.

The theatre exchanged hands on several occasions throughout the 2010s. It was purchased by geologist and former cinematographer Francisco Navidad in 2012, however with the decline of the Bluestones Mines at Renison Bell, Navidad was forced to relocate and closed The Paragon in 2014. The theatre was advertised for sale on Gumtree in 2015. Joy Chappell and Anthony Coulson bought the theatre in 2017. Significant cracks in the concrete floor appeared in 2018 as the original floorboards beneath succumb to rot. At a cost of $75,000, funds were raised from a government grant and local charity to drill 136 holes into the floor to underpin the structure. Less than three months later, Jeff Lang and Mark Seymour & The Undertow performed at the venue as part of The Unconformity festival.

== Contemporary use ==
Since its reopening in 2017, The Paragon has become a venue for events and dinnertime screenings of bygone films.

The Paragon has been a key venue for The Unconformity, a biennial three-day arts, music and food festival since 2012. The Unconformity 2021 festival was cancelled due to COVID-19, and is set to return in 2023.

== See also ==
List of theatres in Hobart
