= Launceston Courier =

The Launceston Courier was a weekly newspaper published in Launceston, Tasmania, from 12 October 1840 to 20 March 1843.

== History ==
The paper was established by John Knight (c. 1800 – 7 December 1860) of Carr Villa, Launceston, who was also a partner with John Pascoe Fawkner and Henry Dowling in the Launceston Advertiser (1829–1846), selling his interest to Benard Charles Jolly in September 1843.

In its final year it incorporated a section Launceston Courier and Teetotal Advocate.

Not to be confused with the Weekly Courier, published in Launceston 1901–1935 by the company whose Examiner continues to this day.

== Trove ==
The Launceston Courier has been digitized by the National Library of Australia and may be accessed via Trove.

The Teetotal Advocate

== See also ==
- List of newspapers in Tasmania
