= Walter Woods (politician) =

Australian politician, journalist and poet

Walter Alan Woods (28 December 1861 – 28 February 1939) was an Australian Labor politician and journalist.

He was born Walter William Head at Oakleigh, Victoria on 28 December 1861. He later used various names throughout his life.

== Parliamentary career ==
In 1906 he was elected to the Tasmanian House of Assembly for North Hobart, representing the Labor Party; with the introduction of proportional representation in 1909 he was elected as one of the members for Denison. He served as Speaker of the House from 1914 to 1916. In 1917 he resigned to contest the Senate election but was unsuccessful. Re-elected to the House in 1925, he was re-appointed Speaker in 1926, serving until 1928. Woods was defeated in 1931 and died in 1939 at Hobart.

== Journalist career ==
In 1891 he was one of the founders of the Labor newspaper The Hummer, a forerunner of The Australian Worker.

On moving to Launceston in 1895, he was editor of The Tasmanian Democrat, then moved to Hobart and took over the editorship of The Clipper, which he transformed into a Labor publication.

He also wrote, as "John Drayman", several bush ballads, the best known being I Don't Go Shearing Now.
