= The True Colonist =

Former newspaper in Hobart, Tasmania

Front page of first issue, 5 August 1834

The True Colonist Van Diemen's Land Political Despatch, And Agricultural And Commercial Advertiser was a newspaper published in Hobart, Tasmania, Australia.

== History ==
The newspaper was published by Gilbert Robertson from 5 August 1834 (Volume 1 No 1) to 26 December 1844.

== Digitisation ==
The newspaper has been digitised and is available via Trove.
