= The Tasmanian Times =

The Tasmanian Times, 18 May 1867, page 1 of first issue

The Tasmanian Times was a newspaper published in Hobart, Tasmania, Australia. It was formerly known as the Evening Mail.

== History ==
The newspaper was published from 1867 to 1870 by Donald Macmillan. It was published tri-weekly on Tuesday, Thursday and Saturday mornings. It was a single sheet of double demy. It cost 3 shillings for a quarter year or one penny per issue.

== Digitisation ==
The newspaper has been digitised and is available on Trove.
