= Queenstown Post Office =

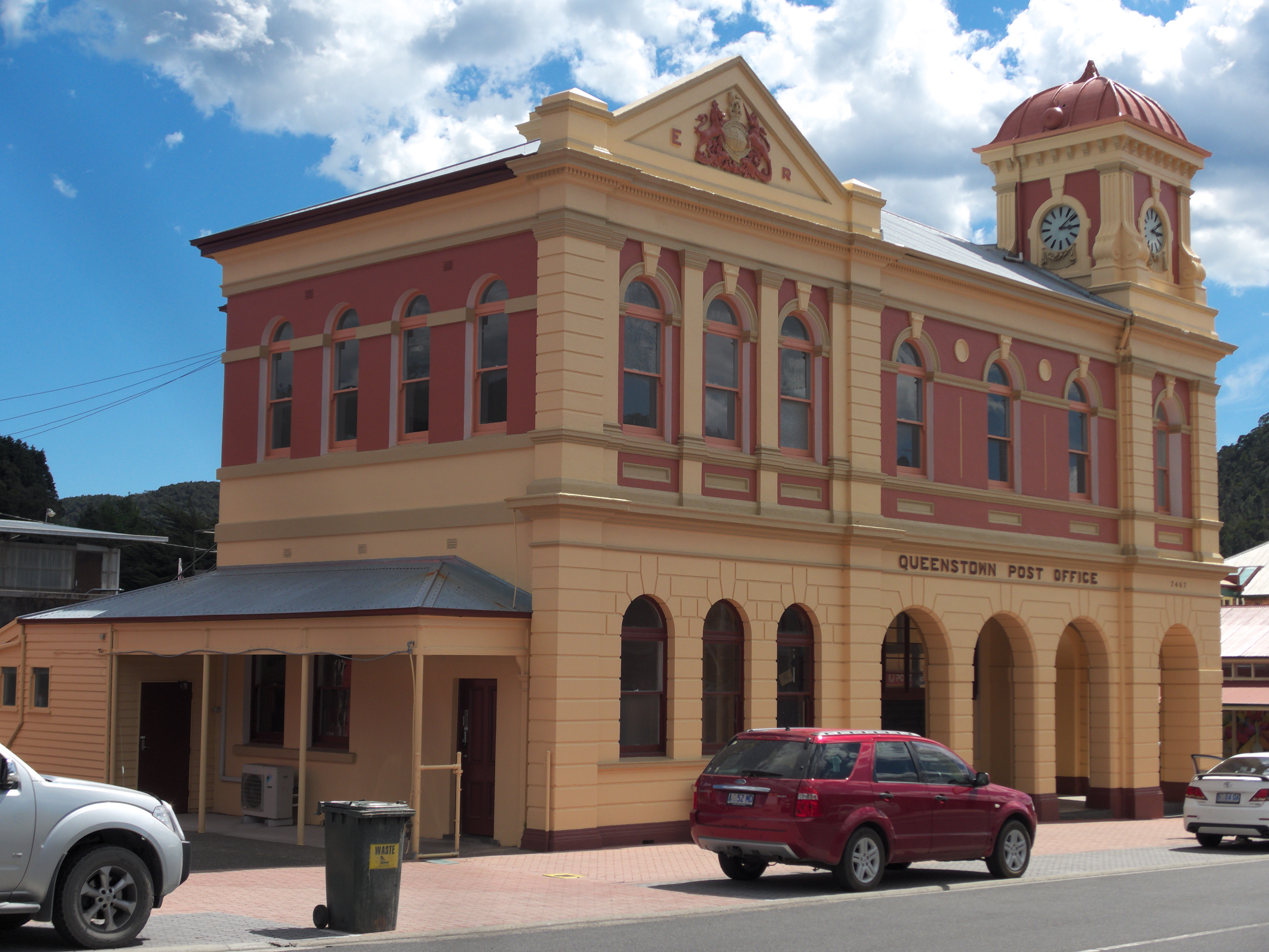

- Location within Tasmania
- 42.0802°S 145.5565°E
- Location: 32–34 Orr Street, Queenstown, Tasmania, Australia

Commonwealth Heritage List
- Official name: Queenstown Post Office
- Type: Listed place (Historic)
- Designated: 22 June 2004
- Reference no.: 105234

Queenstown Post Office is a heritage-listed post office at 32–34 Orr Street, Queenstown, Tasmania, Australia. It was designed by the Tasmanian government's Public Works Office and built in 1902, with the tower added in 1909. It was added to the Australian Commonwealth Heritage List on 22 June 2004.

== History ==
Located about 250 km northwest of Hobart, Queenstown is a large mining settlement, which has operated continuously for around 120 years. Charles Gould first explored the area in the 1860s, but the remoteness of the place and rugged terrain delayed settlement until the discovery of gold at Queen River in 1881. An influx of prospectors and miners followed, many travelling down the west coast to the port of Strahan, then walking inland to the diggings. Two years later, three miners discovered the rocky outcrop known as Iron Blow and by 1888 the Mount Lyell Gold Mining Company was formed.

The area's deposits of alluvial gold were limited and by 1891, attention turned to its substantial copper deposits. A tent city sprung up around the first smelters in Penghana but in late 1896, the township was destroyed by fire and settlers forced to relocate to the neighbouring settlement of Queenstown, also known as Polkana and Queen Crossing. The establishment of rail services the following year accelerated the town's growth and by 1899, Queenstown had 1300 dwellings and a population of 5000.

More broadly, the establishment of postal services in Tasmania's west coast coincided with the discovery of valuable minerals in the 1880s. The first office was at Gormanston in 1884, with mail arriving at Strahan by ship and then being transported overland to the diggings. The Penghana Post Office was built in 1886–87 following the discovery of the Mount Lyell ores. Following the 1896 fire, postal services relocated to Queenstown and a timber post office was built there in 1896–97. By the end of the century, ship mail was arriving via Strahan three times a week and there was a daily service to northwest coast and Launceston.

Queenstown developed rapidly and by 1901, the central activities district centred around Orr and Sticht streets, including two and three-storey hotels, shops and public buildings. Growth was then curtailed in the years 1900–10, following a dramatic slump in copper prices. By 1925, the population had dropped to about half its level at Federation and it was not until the 1960s, with the development of the Prince Lyell copper fields that it again reached these levels. Mount Lyell Mines continued to operate until 1972 when they were taken over by the Renison Gold Company.

The current Queenstown Post Office (originally a Post, Telegraph and Money Order Office) was constructed in 1902, replacing the earlier building. Charles W. Leeming was the first postmaster, and the building was designed by the Tasmanian Government Public Works Office, prior to the Commonwealth taking over this responsibility. The substantial two-storey stucco building was erected at the tailend of the town's boom period, but reflected the growth and optimism of the preceding years. It underwent alterations and additions in 1907. The clock and chimes were not installed until 1909.

The building received a new roof in 1928, and a new porch and outbuildings were built in 1932, as well as a new garage and fuel bin in 1943. It underwent substantial remodelling at a cost of $23,931 in 1963. A disabled ramp was added in 1994–95. In 2001, an interior wall was removed to enlarge the public area, the Sticht Street alcove was infilled, and the retail area was refurbished with standard Australia Post livery.

The ground floor continues to be used as a post office, while the first floor is now vacant.

== Description ==
Queenstown Post Office is at 32–34 Orr Street, corner Sticht Street, Queenstown. It is built in the Federation Free Classical style.

Queenstown Post Office is located on the site of the previous post office, which was built in 1897 at the corner of Orr and Sticht Streets. Built in 1902, it is a two-storied stucco building with a corner clock tower surmounted by a curved ogee roof. The general building mass is rectangular in plan form with a loggia built out to the north (Orr Street) and west (Sticht Street) street pavements. The east and south yards are concreted and a small weatherboard carpark is located in the southeast corner of the site. A small steel-framed awning has subsequently been erected along the east building elevation where there is a separate entry. A steel-framed stair has been erected at the southeast rear corner and provides external access to the first floor.

The principal elevations are similar in detail but asymmetrical, a composition emphasized by the inclusion of a deep L-shaped loggia at the ground level. This element serves to separate the corner tower assembly from the breakfronted end bays – one-arched bay (west) and three-arched bays (north) – which are surmounted by triangular pediments. A single-storey L-shaped porch extension has been erected on the south side of the building, with a similar coursed stucco wall treatment to the original building. Its rear and side walls have face red brickwork with steel-framed window openings. More generally, the rear (south) two-storey section of wall is weatherboarded.

Compositionally the design derives freely from a range of classical motifs and sources. The ground floor is presented as an arcaded basement along sixteenth-century palazzo lines, with the four largest arches fronting a return loggia containing the entry. The clock tower base is given a different grain with narrower entry arches and grouped window arches differentiate the two flanking end breakfronts. The clock tower extends another level past the first floor, set on a stuccoed base with large scroll consoles and a close-bracketed eave over resembling a dentil moulding. It is topped by an ogival metal-decked roof, a popular device in the 1900s. The clock faces are housed in arched aedicules and linked to the cornice by extruded keystones, an Edwardian Baroque touch, also evident in the end pediments which are flanked by wide pilasters. The tympanums have shallow relief depicting the Australian crest and date 19 – 02 (north) and the Tasmanian crest (west).

Horizontally, the elevations are divided into two levels by expressive lines located at the raised course below the ground floor arch springing points and a string course, which encircles the first floor as a balustrade augmented by coffered panelling. Each floor level is marked by an entablature.

The main post office entry is located at the south return leg of the loggia and post office boxes have subsequently been installed along the inner wall openings. The main retail area is open in plan form, divided spatially by a large counter, a timber veneered partition and a structural beam which has been installed to support the first floor following the removal of loadbearing walls. Beyond this is a large workroom with mail sorting areas are loosely organised around the post office box (loggia) and a central area with three fire hearth placements. Beyond this again, staff amenities are located in the southeast corner which includes a stairwell to the first floor, toilets and an exit passage to the east side porch. The glazed double doors in the south porch extension facing Sticht Street are locked and no longer used.

Internally, the first floor comprises large perimeter rooms which are grouped around a central non-linear passage. Entered via the southeast stair, the floor is vacant and exhibits at a high level of dereliction. The original usage of the upper floor for residential or other purposes has not been clarified and the current configuration appears to relate to the 1960s refurbishment comprising (east to west) a large Post-Tel Institute room, toilet amenities, staff room and clock tower access (north); and two storerooms and the stair atrium (south). A projecting awning has been added to provide access to the external stair.

=== Condition and integrity ===
Externally, Queenstown Post Office's ability to demonstrate its original design is relatively good. The key alterations to the building's streetscape presentation are associated with the single storey extension along Sticht Street, which is detailed to match the original stucco walling, the installation of post office boxes to the loggia wall openings and the overpainting of the stucco in a high-contrast red and mustard colour scheme. The corner flagpole is missing and the roof cladding altered. The upper return wall along Sticht Street has been altered by the removal of its parapet and entablature, wall stucco and wide chimney. The rear (south) of the building is substantially altered by the construction of the steel external stair and projecting weatherboard awning, in addition to the redbrick extension at the rear of the south porch.

While the design intent is legible externally, cumulative works have been undertaken throughout the majority of the interior spaces and currently, Australia Post operates only from the ground floor. Beyond the loggia, little evidence remains of the original plan form of the postal hall, telegraph office and/or money order office functions and the strong room was not located. Generally, perimeter windows are extant as constructed, although many interior walls have been demolished and evidence of decorative detail either removed or concealed.

The first floor retains its original building elements, such as lathe plaster walls and ceilings, windows, door architraves, 4-panel doors and moulded skirtings, but the walls and ceiling throughout are in a derelict condition and require maintenance to stabilise this situation. In particular, much of the plaster is cracked or loose due to water damage and sustained roof leakage. The floor is subsiding in the vicinity of the stairwell and rising damp is evident in various places along the perimeter walls. Structural cracking is also evident in the ceilings and walls, possibly due to movement and/or settlement associated with the removal of the ground floor load bearing walls.

The exterior of the building is generally in good condition although the lack of maintenance to water ingress, rising damp, and possible structural movement represents a risk to its physical integrity.

== Heritage listing ==
Queenstown Post Office, opened as a combined Post, Telegraph and Money Order office in 1902, forms an important part of the city's main street. It has a substantial dual frontage to Orr and Sticht streets, a landmark tower, and relationship to the neighbouring police station and courthouse, all of which combine to demonstrate the role and provision of government services within the town. It demonstrates the importance of communication facilities for this isolated area and is also important for demonstrating stylistically the public face of government at the end of the 19th century. In scale and architectural achievement, the post office embodies a prosperity and future confidence in Queenstown that stemmed from the discovery of mineral deposits in the region in the 1880s. While remotely located in rugged terrain, the building reflects Queenstown's certainty in its future, the force of the minerals boom, and its emergent but short-lived Federation-status as the third largest settlement in Tasmania. The provision of postal services is a substantial part of the story of Federation in Australia. As an example of a post office constructed by the states after Federation, the Queenstown Post Office is significant for its ability to represent the lingering involvement of the states in the provision of postal services after the creation of the Commonwealth

Queenstown Post Office is a prominent two-storey stucco building with a corner tower which stands out in the main street context, in an area with other civic buildings including the courthouse and police station. The building's historic civic or public purpose is evident in the ground floor loggia, clock tower and working chimes, all adding to its landmark qualities. Queenstown is also an unusually intact historic townscape, where buildings of the late Victorian era are well represented, while the post office is a notable and distinctive representative of the following period.

Queenstown Post Office has social significance as the site and focus of postal services within this centre for almost 110 years, but also due to its prominence within the main street context and association with other important civic buildings. The post office is also valued as a notable contributor to the intact historic townscape.

The curtilage includes the title block/allotment of the property.

The significant components of Queenstown Post Office include the main postal building of 1902, and the clock and chimes of 1909. The single-storey porch extension to the Sticht Street elevation is of contributory significance. The redbrick additions to the south, awning to the east elevation, disabled access ramp, carport, external rear stair and projecting vertical boarded awning are not significant.
