= The Daily Telegraph (Launceston) =

Australia newspaper published in Launceston (1881–1928)

The Telegraph, later The Daily Telegraph was a newspaper published in Launceston, Tasmania between 1881 and 1928.

== History ==
A newspaper, The Telegraph was published in Launceston from 2 July 1881 to 15 June 1883; originally as a weekly, then bi-weekly then tri-weekly in its last year of publication.

The first issue of The Daily Telegraph appeared on 18 June 1883, and the last issue appeared on 28 March 1928.

With the imminent demise of the Telegraph, The Mercury of Hobart, from March 1928 expanded its branch office in the northern city, and increased its penetration by putting on "fast cars" to get their paper to Launceston by breakfast, thus putting extra pressure on the Examiner, the Telegraph's competitor.

Murray Amos White, who had been brought from Melbourne to Tasmania to take the position of editor-in-chief in October 1927 in the hope of reviving the paper's circulation, sued the managing director A. C. Ferrall for not giving him three months' notice of termination of contract.

== Digitisation ==
This newspaper has been digitised from microfilm for the Australian Newspaper Digitisation Project of the National Library of Australia and may be searched using Trove.
