= Daily Post (Hobart) =

Newspaper in Tasmania

The Daily Post was a newspaper published in Hobart, Tasmania from 27 May 1908 to 29 June 1918. It was established by Alfred John Nettlefold and in 1910 The Clipper was merged with it. In 1918, it became The World. Issues have been digitised and are available on Trove.
