= The Clipper =

Former newspaper in Tasmania, Australia

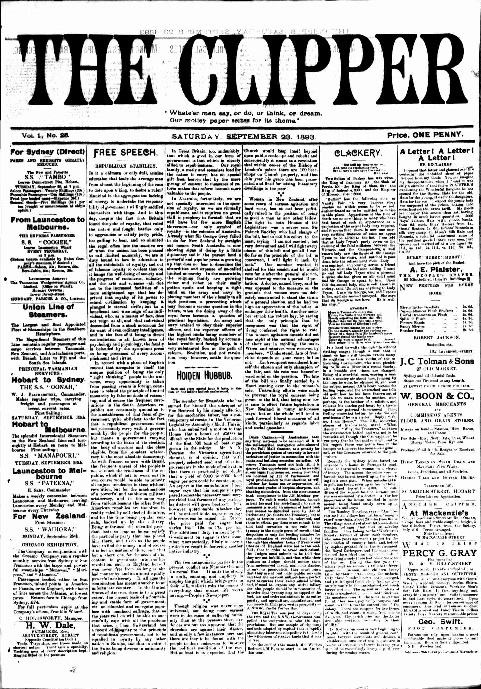
- Edition of 23 September 1893
- Type: Periodical
- Editor: James Paton (1893); Walter Woods (1903)
- Launched: 8 April 1893
- Ceased publication: 25 December 1909
- Political alignment: Socialism in Australia
- City: Hobart, Tasmania
- ISSN: 1839-714X

The Clipper was a weekly labor-orientated newspaper published in Hobart, Tasmania, from 8 April 1893 until 25 December 1909, before its merger with the Daily Post in 1910.

== History ==
The newspaper was founded by James Paton, proprietor and editor, and Gerald Tempest Massey, printer and publisher

In 1902 Edward Mulcahy, Minister of Lands in the Tasmanian government, sued Paton and Massey for defamation of character, in respect of an article alleging impropriety in awarding a contract for the Strahan storm water channel. Paton left for Western Australia, and Massey founded The Critic

Walter Alan Woods became editor and part owner in 1903, until the newspaper merged with the Daily Post in 1910.

The paper has been digitised as part of the Australian Newspapers Digitisation Project by the National Library of Australia.

== See also ==
- List of newspapers in Australia
