= Queenstown, Tasmania =

Queenstown
- Town
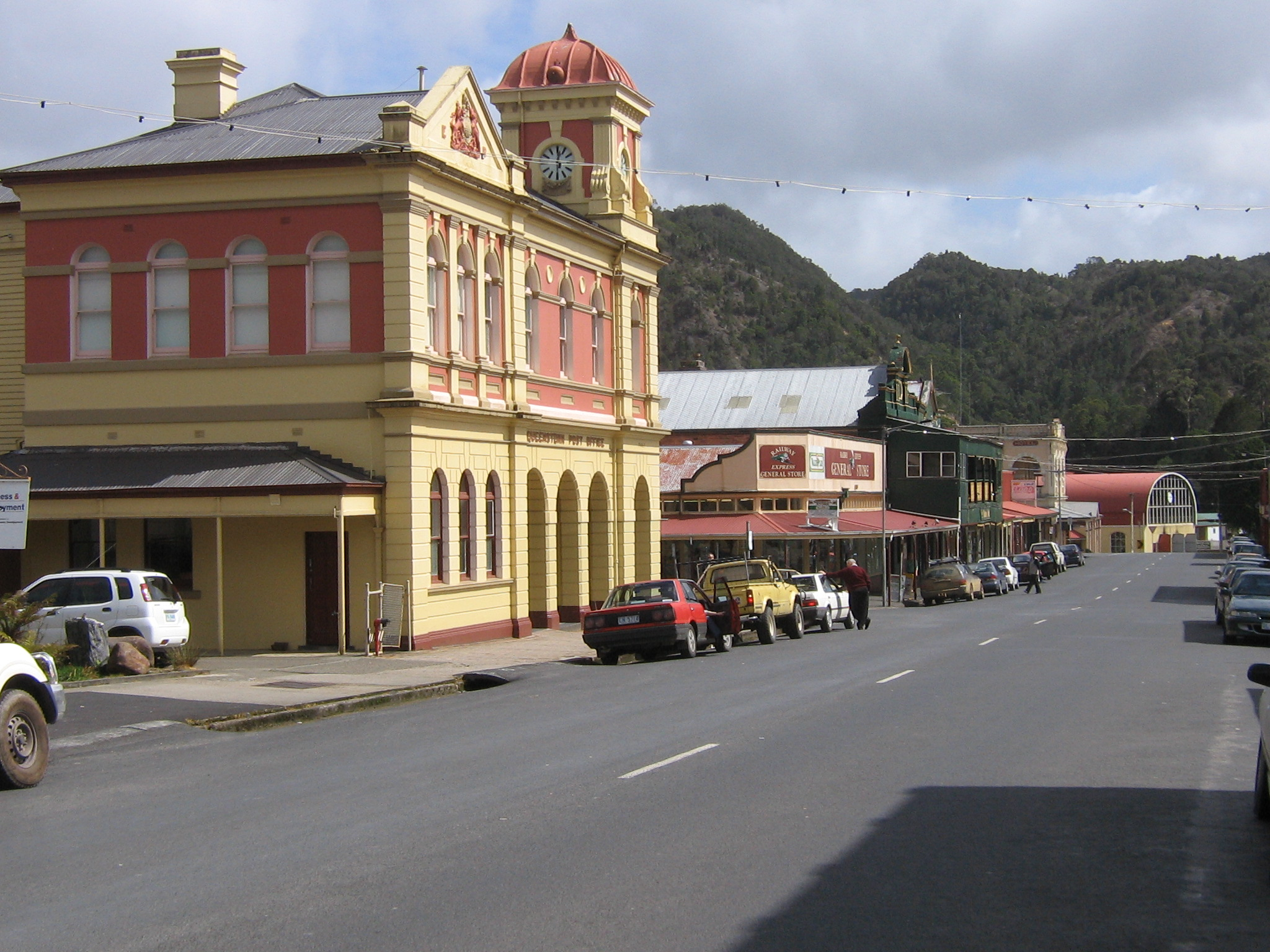
- Orr Street, from centre, looking west

- Coordinates: 42°04′50″S 145°33′20″E
- Country: Australia
- State: Tasmania
- LGA: West Coast Council
- Location: 41 km (25 mi) from Strahan; 55 km (34 mi) from Rosebery; 154 km (96 mi) from Burnie; 248 km (154 mi) from Hobart

Government
  - State electorate: Braddon
  - Federal division: Braddon
- Elevation: 129 m (423 ft)

Population
  - Total: 1,808 (2021 census)
- Postcode: 7467
- Mean max temp: 16.4 °C (61.5 °F)
- Mean min temp: 5.6 °C (42.1 °F)
- Annual rainfall: 2,408.2 mm (94.81 in)

Queenstown is a historic mining town in the West Coast region of the island of Tasmania, Australia. It is in a valley on the western slopes of Mount Owen on the West Coast Range.

At the 2021 census, Queenstown had a population of 1,808 people.

== History ==
Queenstown's history has long been tied to the mining industry. This mountainous area was first explored in 1862. It was not long after that when alluvial gold was discovered at Mount Lyell, prompting the formation of the Mount Lyell Gold Mining Company in 1881. In 1892, the mining company began searching for copper. The final name of the Mount Lyell company was the Mount Lyell Mining and Railway Company.

Early in 1895 a Post Office was opened at Penghana, at the Queen River fork and crossing, about a kilometre north of present-day Queenstown on the road to Strahan; James Robertson was appointed the first postmaster. The only other substantial building nearby was Robertson & Hunter's store. Queenstown Post Office opened on 21 November 1896 and the Penghana office closed; Mary Mylan was the first postmaster. The present-day Queenstown Post Office dates from 1902 and is heritage-listed. The name "Penghana" was adopted for a substantial house nearby, from around 1925–1944 the residence of Mount Lyell mine manager R. M. Murray, and persists today as Penghana Road.

About 1900 the Lyell Caledonian Society was formed, held sports days, celebrated Burns Nights, a ball, and had a pipe band; all keeping alive the Scottish culture. The society dissolved on 1 January 1930.

A Queenstown South office opened in 1949 and closed in 1973.

In the 1900s, Queenstown was the centre of the Mount Lyell mining district and had numerous smelting works, brick-works, and sawmills. The area at the time was heavily wooded. The population in 1900 was 5051; the district, 10,451.

The town was the base of the Queenstown Council until its amalgamation with other west coast councils in the 1990s. The town, in its heyday, had a collection of hotels, theatres, churches and schools that have largely disappeared since the demise of the Mount Lyell company in 2014.

The town was the base of the Organisation for Tasmanian Development started in 1982.

There was a brief boom in prosperity in the 1980s, with the building of several nearby dams by the Hydro. The Darwin and Crotty dams that comprise Lake Burbury (a popular fishing and recreation venue) were built during this period. These followed the cancellation of the Gordon-below-Franklin Dam in 1983 after strong campaigning by environmentalists in the 'No Dams' campaign.

== Ecology ==
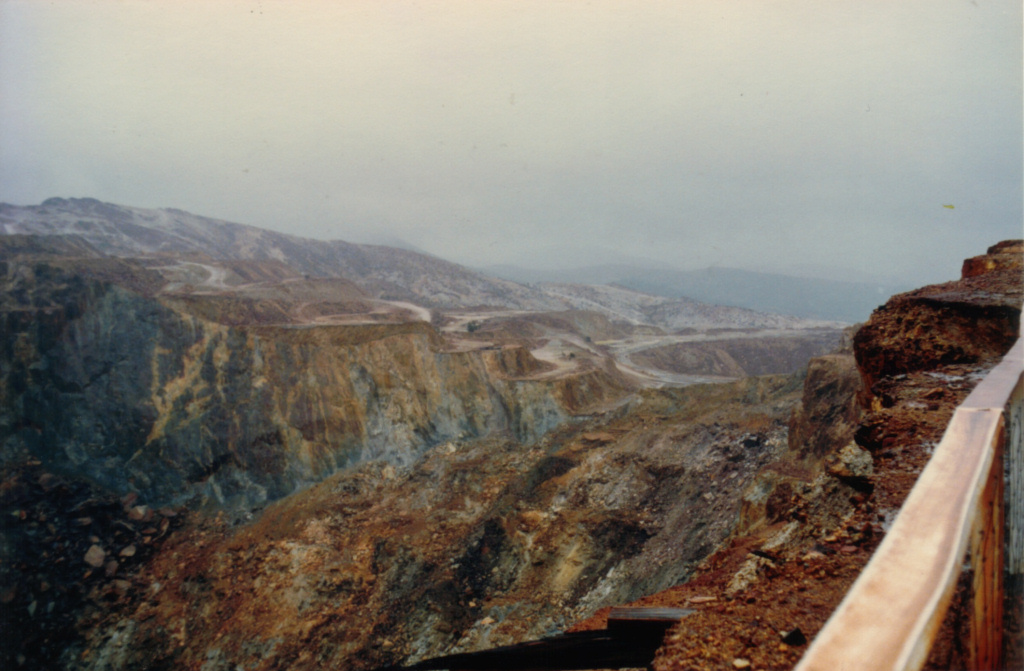
Queenstown moonscape, December 1984

The mountains surrounding Queenstown have unusual pink and grey hues that come from the conglomerate rocks on the two most adjacent mountains – Mount Lyell and Mount Owen. The mountains surrounding Queenstown are often snowcapped through winter. Snow falls a few days out of the year.

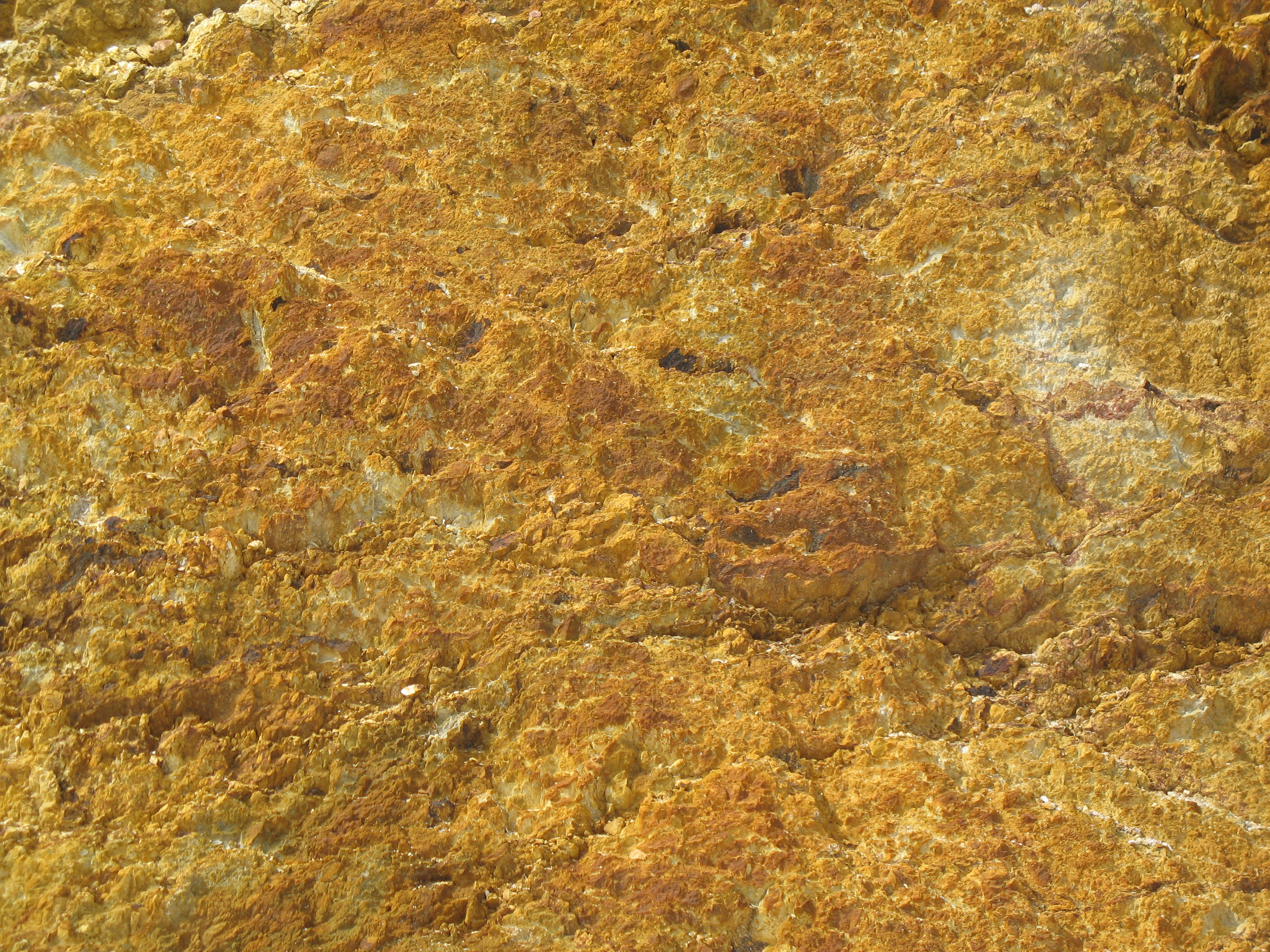
A close-up shot of rock in the mountains surrounding Queenstown

Owing to a combination of tree removal for use in the smelters, the smelter fumes (for about 40 years in the late 20th century) and the heavy annual rainfall, the erosion of the shallow horizon topsoil back to the harder rock profile contributed to the stark state of the mountains for many decades.

Typical of the successions that occur in fire-affected areas in Western Tasmania, the low shrubbery that has revegetated adjacent-to-hillside creeks is a very early stage of a long recovery for the ecology of the region.

There has been occasional concern by some local residents in the 1980s and since, that the low-level succession of plants might affect the stark 'moonscape' appearance of the southern parts of Mount Lyell and northern Mount Owen. Although there are still large areas incapable of sustaining regrowth due to the acute slopes and lack of soil formation, revegetation projects have been ongoing.

The Queen River was for most of the history of the Mount Lyell company the recipient of mining effluent and the Queenstown sewage – which then continued into the King River and consequently the Macquarie Harbour.

The Mount Lyell Remediation and Research and Demonstration Program scheme has since removed the direct flowing mining waste and local waste from the rivers.

== Facilities ==
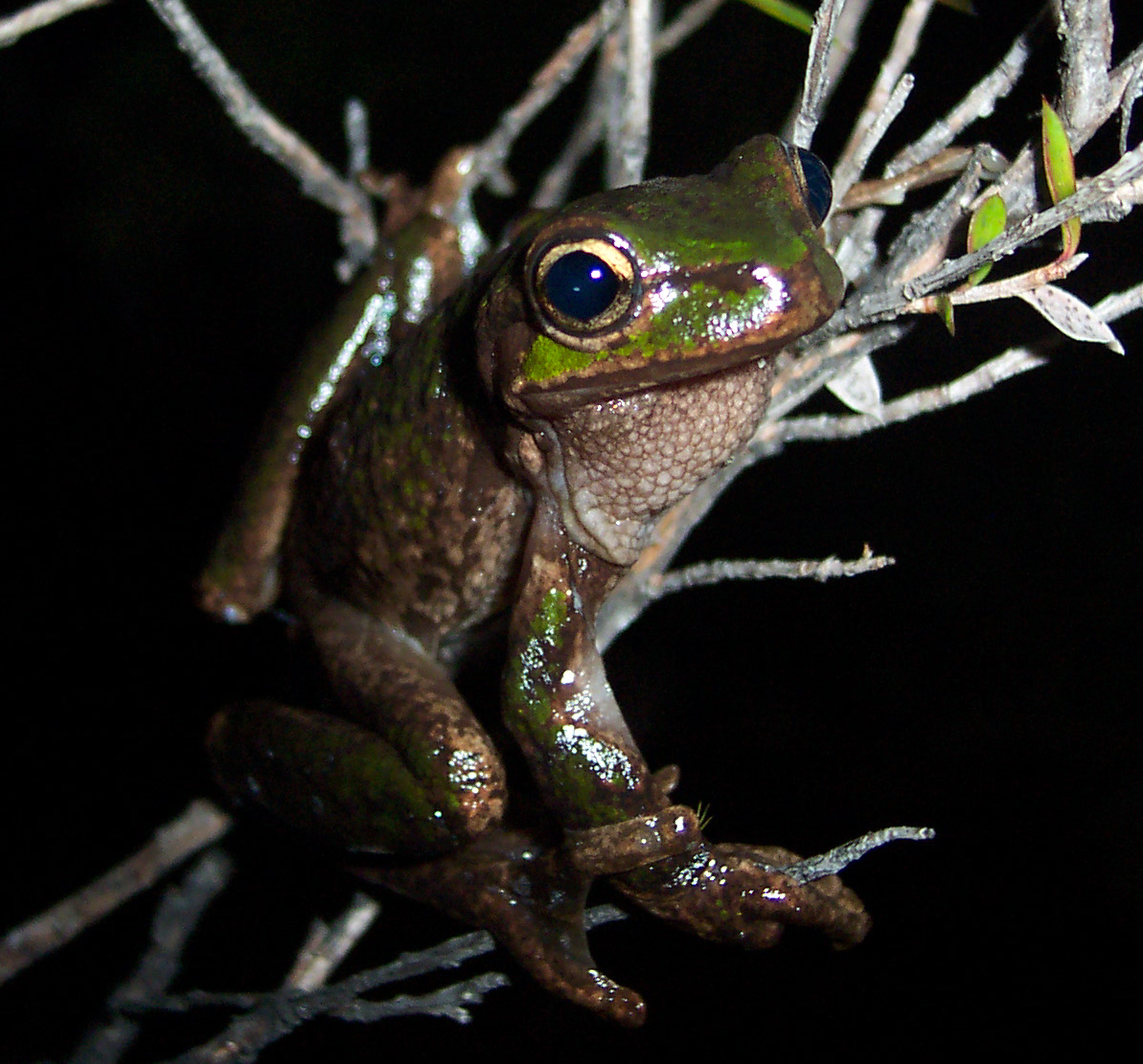
A Tasmanian Tree Frog from Queenstown

Today, the town and district attracts significant numbers of tourists, on either organised tours or the hire car 'circuit' around Tasmania. The grand Empire Hotel overlooks the revived steam train station where rides to Rinadeena through dense rainforest, around one third of the historic line which took ore to the port of Strahan, are available, and includes a stretch of "Abt" rack railway, named for the inventor Roman Abt. The recent addition of mountain bike trails and white water rafting add to the town's growth as a tourist destination. Some older features continue to fascinate tourists, either the mountains, the slag heap, and the gravel football ground. Visitors can catch glimpses of the town's past at the local museum, or simply by driving up Orr Street, the old main street with the dominant Post Office tower.

The mining operation at the original Mount Lyell mine continues, with Copper Mines of Tasmania operating between 1995 and 1999 independently, after which it became part of an Indian company group – and its concentrates are shipped to India for processing. In 2021, Indian mining company Vedanta Limited divested its copper mining activities in Queenstown.

Exploration continues within the West Coast region for further economic mineral deposits, and due to the complexity of the geology, there is always the possibility that new mines will open: the Henty Gold Mine is a good example as it commenced operation in the 1990s.

Queenstown was the terminus of the West Coast Wilderness Railway, which followed the Queen River, and then along the northern slopes of the King River to the port of Strahan in Macquarie Harbour.

=== Queenstown Oval ===
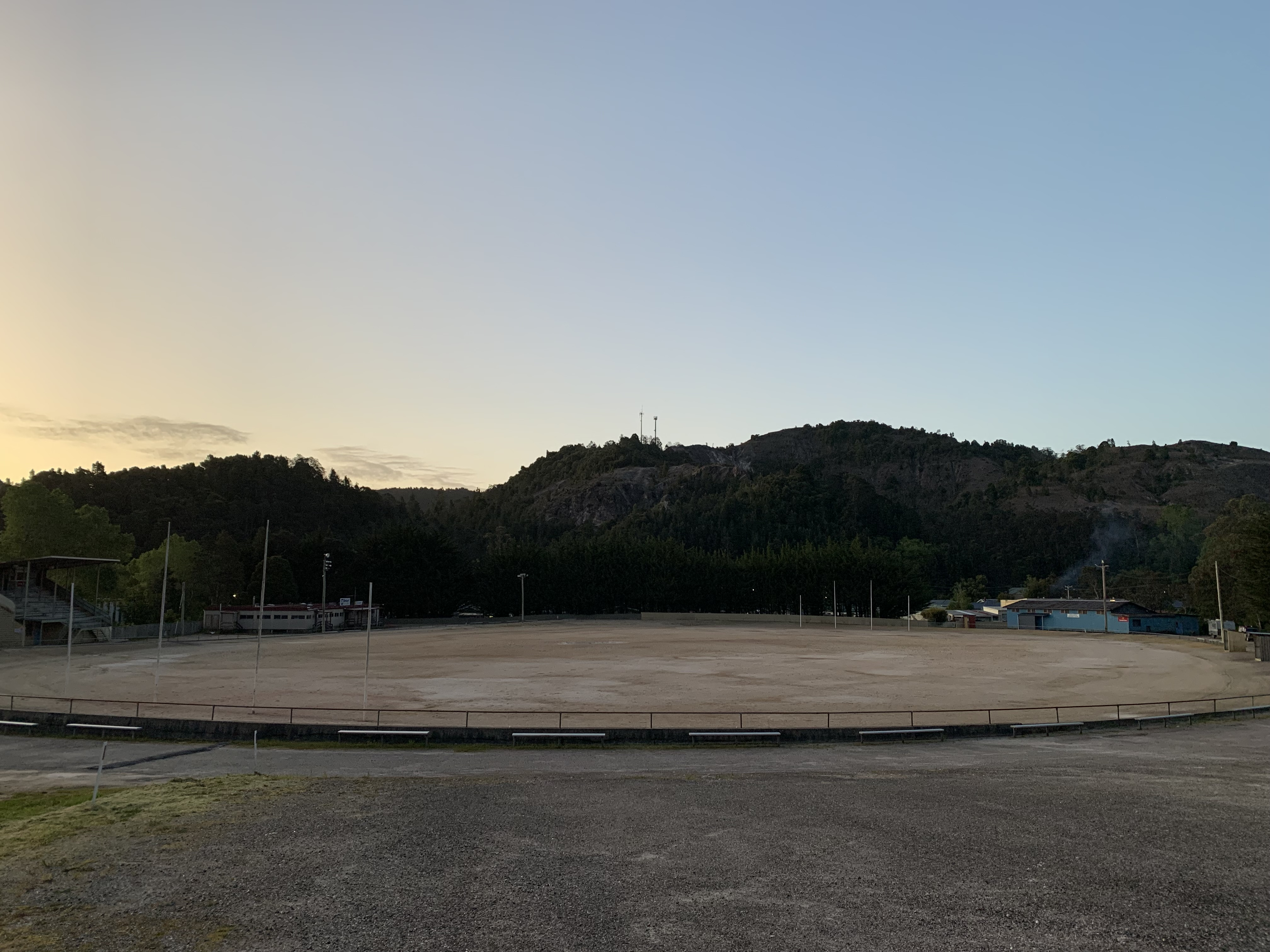
Queenstown Oval

Queenstown is well known for its unique football oval, "The Gravel", which utilises gravel instead of grass. The Queenstown Oval was laid with gravel due to pollution from local mining and heavy rain making it difficult to grow grass. The oval was inducted into the Tasmanian Football Hall of Fame in 2007.

=== Queenstown Heritage and Arts Festival ===
The Queenstown Heritage and Arts Festival was the first name of a biennial festival that celebrates Queenstown's history.

One significant historical event it has celebrated was the centenary of the 1912 North Mount Lyell Disaster in the second festival in October 2012. In the third festival in October 2014, the Hydro Tasmania centenary was a major component.

With key events taking place at The Paragon Theatre, the festival rebranded as the Unconformity Festival in 2016.

=== Public art ===
Walker's installation

Following the closure of the Mount Lyell mine, the municipality commissioned the sculptor Stephen Walker to produce a work commemorating the mining era 1883–1983. The work, in timber and locally cast bronze, presents the flow of history in 21 bas relief sculptures, and one larger-than-life depiction of a worker and his family.

1883 discovery

1890 packing

1896 railway

1900 smelting

1903 Masonic lodge

1909 smelting

SS Kini

1912 42 deaths

1920 picnic

1926 Huon pine

1932 road link

1932 town band

1945 peace returns

1956 offshore fishing

1965 last train

1972 expansion

1983 Salvation Army

hydro power

joint venture

mechanisation

Worker and family

== Climate ==
Queenstown has a very wet oceanic climate (Cfb), and is one of the wettest locations in Tasmania with an annual average rainfall of 2408.2 mm (94.8 in), spread throughout the year but especially concentrated in winter. Summers are cool to mild and heavily prone to cold fronts off the Roaring Forties, although temperatures can occasionally rise above 30 °C, while winters are cool to cold and almost always cloudy; however, during rare clear spells overnight temperatures can drop well below freezing. Brief, light snow usually occurs several times each winter, with occasional heavier snow falling every few years. Queenstown is very cloudy, getting only 29 days of clear skies annually.

Climate data for Queenstown (7XS, 1964–1995); 129 m AMSL; 42.10° S, 145.54° E
Month	Jan	Feb	Mar	Apr	May	Jun	Jul	Aug	Sep	Oct	Nov	Dec	Year
Record high °C (°F)	37.3 (99.1)	36.3 (97.3)	35.9 (96.6)	29.5 (85.1)	25.0 (77.0)	19.5 (67.1)	19.5 (67.1)	21.0 (69.8)	26.4 (79.5)	29.0 (84.2)	33.3 (91.9)	35.3 (95.5)	37.3 (99.1)
Mean maximum °C (°F)	31.8 (89.2)	31.5 (88.7)	29.5 (85.1)	25.0 (77.0)	21.0 (69.8)	16.9 (62.4)	15.8 (60.4)	18.0 (64.4)	20.3 (68.5)	24.9 (76.8)	28.0 (82.4)	30.4 (86.7)	33.6 (92.5)
Mean daily maximum °C (°F)	21.0 (69.8)	22.0 (71.6)	19.9 (67.8)	16.6 (61.9)	14.4 (57.9)	12.2 (54.0)	11.6 (52.9)	12.4 (54.3)	13.5 (56.3)	15.9 (60.6)	17.6 (63.7)	19.3 (66.7)	16.4 (61.5)
Daily mean °C (°F)	14.7 (58.5)	15.3 (59.5)	13.8 (56.8)	11.6 (52.9)	9.5 (49.1)	7.5 (45.5)	7.0 (44.6)	7.8 (46.0)	8.8 (47.8)	10.5 (50.9)	12.0 (53.6)	13.6 (56.5)	11.0 (51.8)
Mean daily minimum °C (°F)	8.3 (46.9)	8.6 (47.5)	7.6 (45.7)	6.5 (43.7)	4.5 (40.1)	2.7 (36.9)	2.4 (36.3)	3.1 (37.6)	4.0 (39.2)	5.1 (41.2)	6.4 (43.5)	7.9 (46.2)	5.6 (42.1)
Mean minimum °C (°F)	2.4 (36.3)	2.7 (36.9)	1.6 (34.9)	0.4 (32.7)	−1.5 (29.3)	−3.2 (26.2)	−3.3 (26.1)	−2.5 (27.5)	−1.5 (29.3)	−0.9 (30.4)	0.4 (32.7)	2.2 (36.0)	−4.3 (24.3)
Record low °C (°F)	0.0 (32.0)	0.0 (32.0)	−1.1 (30.0)	−2.6 (27.3)	−6.0 (21.2)	−6.2 (20.8)	−6.7 (19.9)	−5.5 (22.1)	−3.9 (25.0)	−3.3 (26.1)	−1.5 (29.3)	−0.6 (30.9)	−6.7 (19.9)
Average rainfall mm (inches)	149.9 (5.90)	98.8 (3.89)	147.2 (5.80)	211.3 (8.32)	241.4 (9.50)	212.7 (8.37)	268.6 (10.57)	267.5 (10.53)	248.5 (9.78)	209.9 (8.26)	183.7 (7.23)	168.7 (6.64)	2,408.2 (94.79)
Average rainy days (≥ 0.2mm)	17.2	12.9	17.3	20.6	21.2	19.9	23.7	24.6	23.1	21.7	19.7	18.6	240.5
Average afternoon relative humidity (%)	60	60	65	72	76	77	77	73	71	64	63	63	68
Source: Bureau of Meteorology

== Demographics ==
At the 2021 census, Queenstown had a population of 1,808 people (929 males and 878 females). The median age was 47. Children aged 0–14 years made up 15.3% of the population and people aged 65 years and over made up 22.3% of the population.

According to the 2021 census, the most common responses for religion in Queenstown were No Religion (40.5%), Catholic (22.0%), Anglican (16.7%), and Uniting Church (3.1%). Aboriginal and Torres Strait Islander people made up 6.7% of the population.

The median weekly personal income for people aged 15 years and over in Queenstown was $509 while the median weekly incomes for families and households were $1,371 and $851 respectively.

== Panorama ==
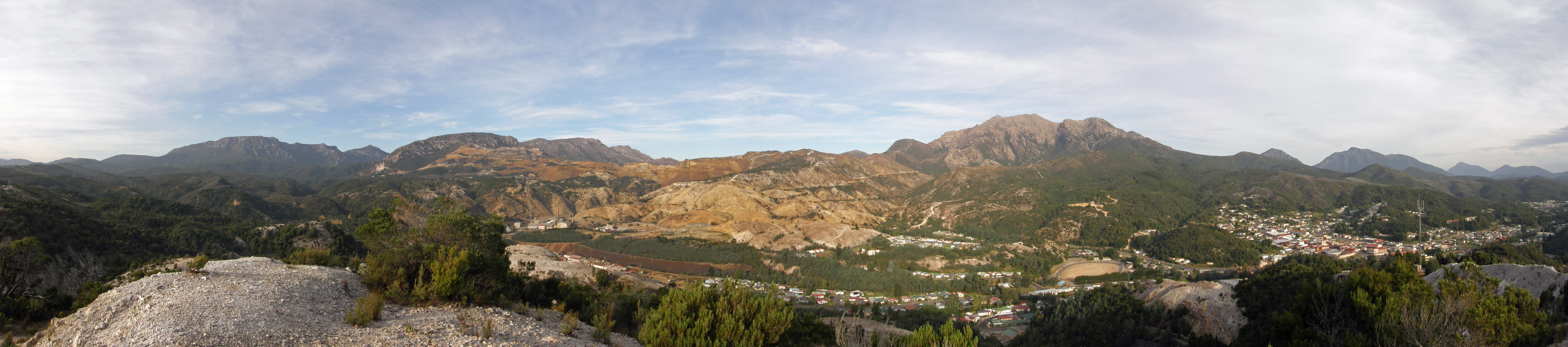
Panorama of Queenstown

== Gallery ==
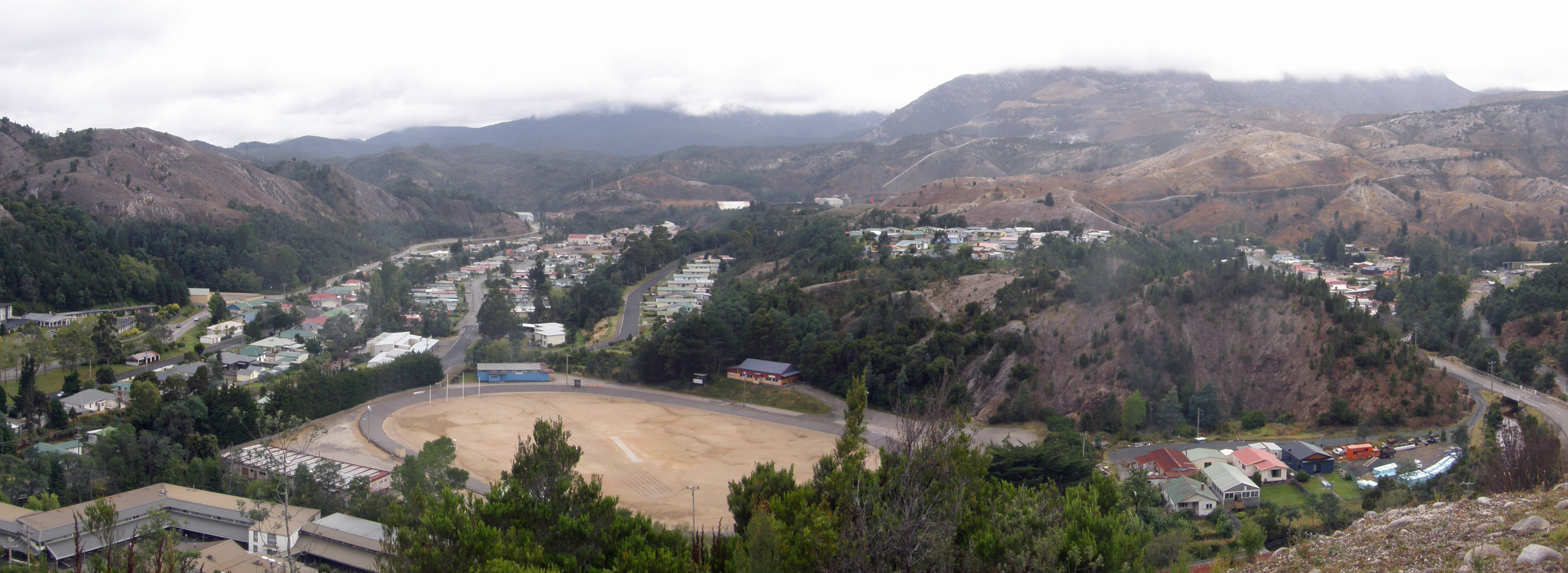
Queenstown gravel oval

== See also ==
- West Coast Tasmania Mines
- Horsetail Falls (Tasmania, Australia)
- Queenstown Oval
