= Dove Lake (Tasmania) =

Lake in Cradle Mountain-Lake St. Clair National Park, Tasmania,

- Weebaunetinker
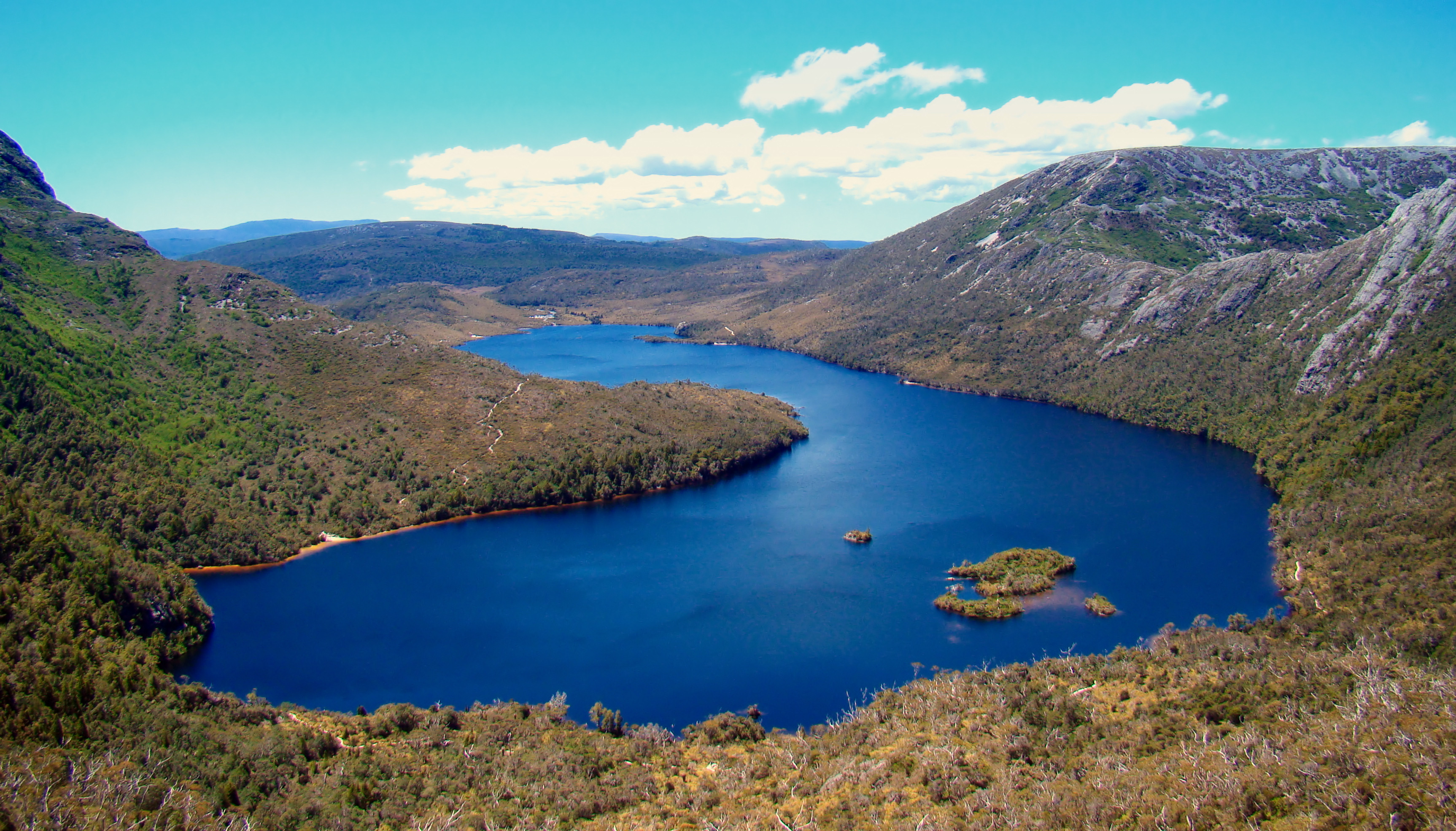
- Dove Lake seen from the south

- Location in Tasmania
- Location: Cradle Mountain-Lake St Clair National Park, Central Highlands, Tasmania
- Coordinates: 41°39′29″S 145°57′43″E
- Type: Corrie
- Primary inflows: Dove River
- Primary outflows: Dove River
- Basin countries: Australia
- Designation: Cradle Mountain-Lake St Clair National Park
- Max. length: 2.1 km (1.3 mi)
- Max. width: 0.7 km (0.43 mi)
- Surface area: 86 ha (210 acres)
- Max. depth: 157 m (515 ft)
- Shore length^{1}: 6.6 km (4.1 mi)
- Surface elevation: 938 m (3,077 ft)
- ^{1} Shore length is not a well-defined measure.

Dove Lake is a corrie lake near Cradle Mountain in the central highlands region of Tasmania, Australia. It lies in the Cradle Mountain-Lake St Clair National Park. The lake is a very popular visitor attraction and is encircled by well maintained walking paths which also lead up onto Cradle Mountain. It was named by prominent local Gustav Weindorfer after an official of the Van Diemen's Land Company.

Like several other lakes in the region, Lake Dove was formed by glaciation. The habitat is unique and includes the Tasmanian deciduous beech (Nothofagus gunnii), tussock grasses, snow gums and pencil pines. Among animals wandering the shores of the lake are numerous wombats, echidnas, pademelons and tiger snakes.

== See also ==
- List of lakes of Australia § Tasmania
- List of reservoirs and dams in Australia § Tasmania
- List of lakes in Australia § Glacial lakes
