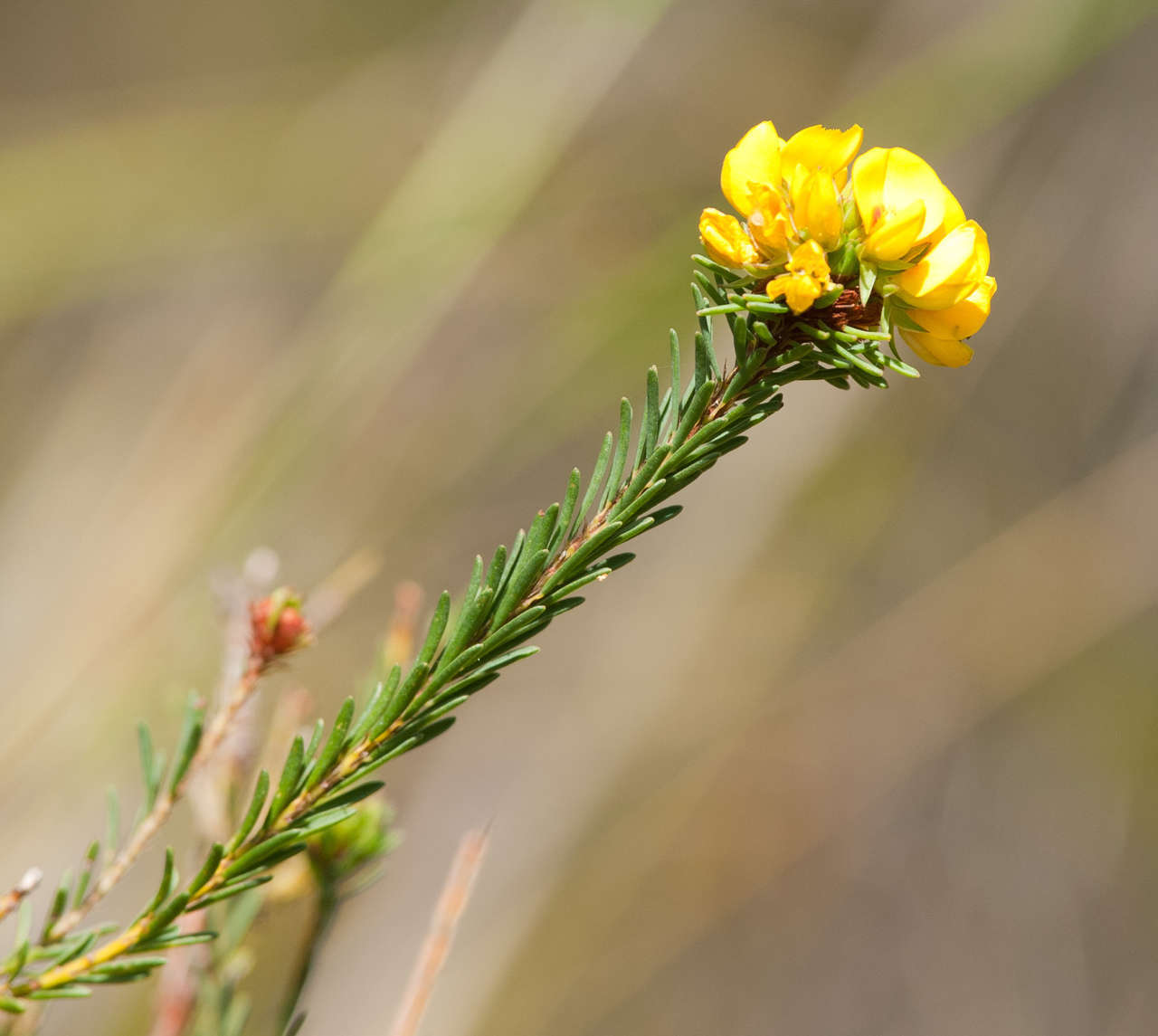

Scientific classification
- Kingdom: Plantae
- Clade: Tracheophytes
- Clade: Angiosperms
- Clade: Eudicots
- Clade: Rosids
- Order: Fabales
- Family: Fabaceae
- Subfamily: Faboideae
- Genus: Pultenaea
- Species: P. weindorferi

Binomial name
- Pultenaea weindorferi Reader

= Pultenaea weindorferi =

Swamp bush-pea

Species of flowering plant

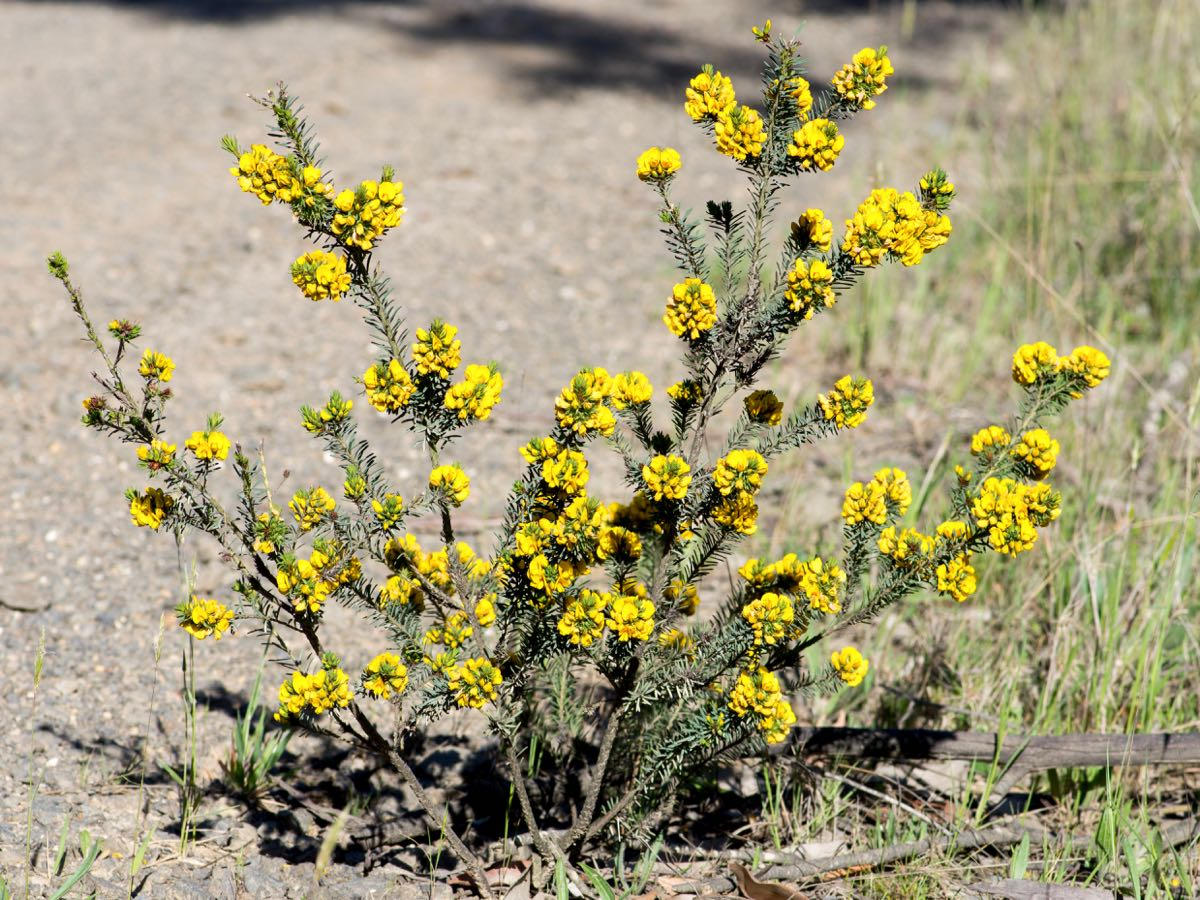
Habit near Ashbourne

Pultenaea weindorferi, commonly known as swamp bush-pea, is a species of flowering plant in the family Fabaceae and is endemic to Victoria, Australia. It is a slender, erect shrub with linear to narrow egg-shaped leaves and uniformly yellow, pea-like flowers.

== Description ==
Pultenaea weindorferi is a slender, erect shrub that typically grew to a height of up to 2 m (6 ft 7 in), and has glabrous stems. The leaves are linear to narrow egg-shaped with the narrower end towards the base, 6–15 mm (0.24–0.59 in) long and 0.75–1.5 mm (0.030–0.059 in) wide with stipules 3–4 mm (0.12–0.16 in) long at the base. The flowers are arranged in clusters of more than six at the ends of the branches with floral leaves with enlarged stipules at the base. The sepals are 5–6 mm (0.20–0.24 in) long with bracteoles attached to the side of the sepal tube. The standard is 6–7 mm (0.24–0.28 in) long and the ovary is usually glabrous. Flowering occurs from October to November.

== Taxonomy and naming ==
Pultenaea weindorferi was first formally described in 1905 by Felix Reader in The Victorian Naturalist from specimens collected in a swamp near Wandin 1903 by Gustav Weindorfer. The specific epithet (weindorferi) honours the collector of the type specimens.

A 2002 paper has proposed that the name of this species is a synonym of Pultenaea glabra.

== Distribution ==
Swamp bush-pea grows in swamps and moist places in scattered places in southern Victoria, including near Tonimbuk, Daylesford and Kinglake.
