= Cradle Mountain-Lake St Clair National Park =

National park in Tasmania, Australia

Cradle Mountain–Lake St Clair National Park
- IUCN category II (national park)
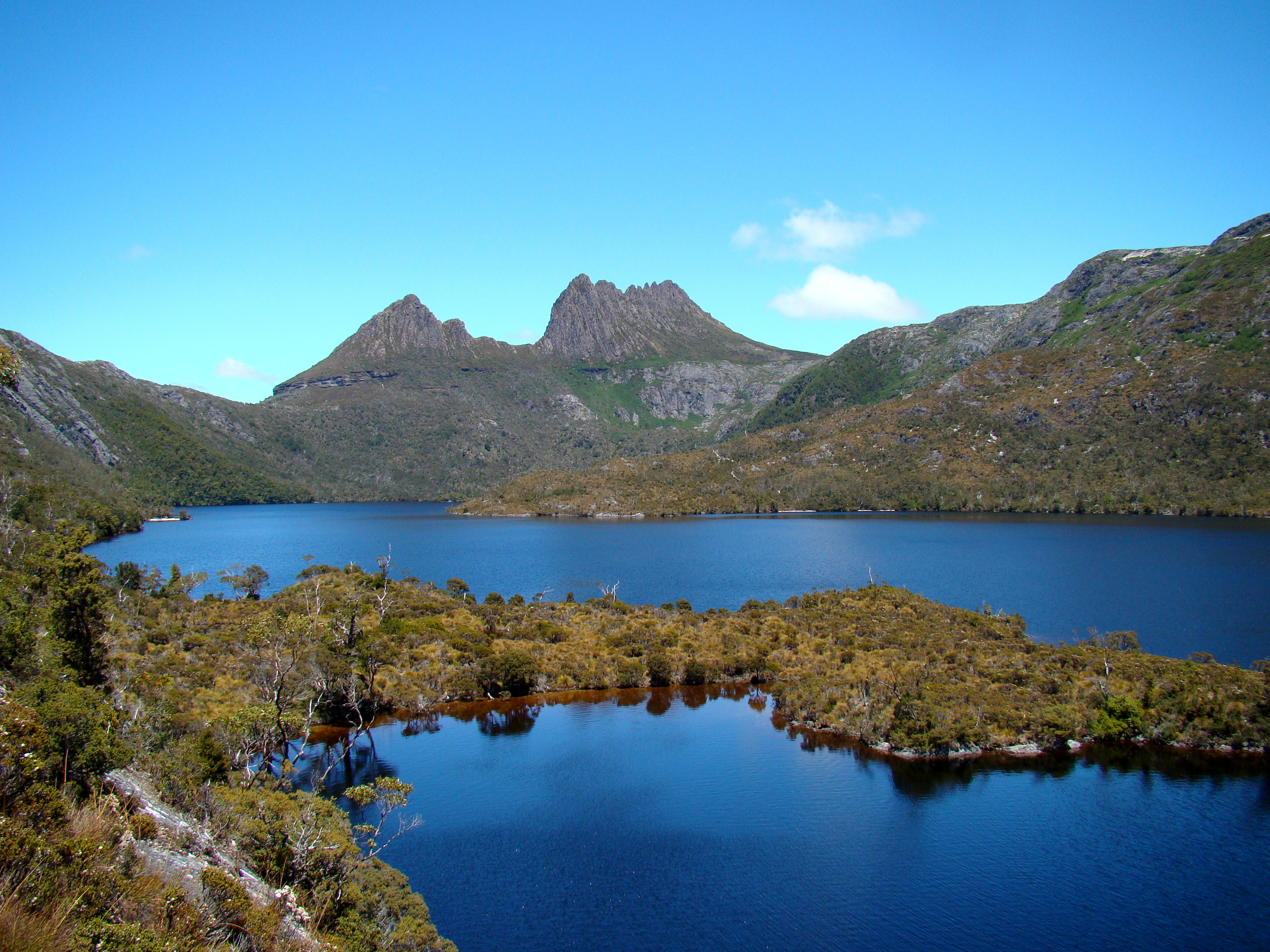
- Cradle Mountain and Little Horn (to the left) by Dove Lake

- Location within Tasmania
- Interactive map of Cradle Mountain–Lake St Clair National Park
- Location: Tasmania
- Nearest city: Queenstown
- Coordinates: 41°49′49″S 145°55′27″E
- Area: 1,614.43 km^{2} (623.33 sq mi)
- Established: 1922
- Visitors: 209000 (in 2005)
- Governing body: Tasmania Parks and Wildlife Service
- Website: https://parks.tas.gov.au/explore-our-parks/cradle-mountain

Cradle Mountain–Lake St Clair National Park is located in the Central Highlands area of Tasmania (Australia), 165 kilometres (103 mi) Northwest of Hobart. The park contains many walking trails, and is where hikes along the well-known Overland Track usually begin. Major features are Cradle Mountain and Barn Bluff in the Northern end, Mount Pelion East, Mount Pelion West, Mount Oakleigh and Mount Ossa in the middle and Lake St Clair in the Southern end of the park. The park is part of the Tasmanian Wilderness World Heritage Area.

== History ==
=== Use by Aboriginal Nations ===
Cradle Mountain–Lake St Clair National Park lies on the boundary between the Big River and Northern Tasmanian Aboriginal nations. Aboriginal use of the Cradle Mountain dates back to the last ice age (10,000 years ago) and is believed to have been non-permanent, consisting mostly of seasonal hunting excursions during the summer months. Several artifacts and campsites containing various stone types and tools have been discovered at Pelion Plains and Lake St Clair, and early surveyors reported huts in the area. Aboriginal Tasmanians were persecuted by the European settlers upon their arrival, and the last free Aboriginals in the area were seen between Barn Bluff and Lake Windemere in 1836.

=== Early European Development ===
Europeans first explored Cradle Mountain in 1827 and 1828 with Joseph Fossey and Henry Hellyer surveying for the Van Diemen's Land Company. Lake St Clair was sighted by surveyor William Sharland in 1832, with George Frankland leading an expedition to it three years later.

During the late 19th century there was an effort to build a railway to the west coast of Tasmania, which at the time was only accessible by boat. Railway engineer Allan Stewart began surveying a route which led up the Mersey Valley, but ran out of money before it could be completed. Parts of his trail were used by the Innes track (est. 1897), which led to the mining town of Rosebery.

These tracks encouraged prospecting, and several mines were set up including coal near Barn Bluff, copper in Pelion Plains, Lake Windemere and Commonwealth Creek, tin in Mount Inglis, and tungsten in the Forth Valley. Lake Windemere and Old Pelion huts were established during this mining effort.

Trappers worked in the area from the 1860s until the collapse of the fur trade in the 1950s, although hunting in the park was declared illegal after 1927. They established huts, including Du Cane and Pine Valley, and burned the land to encourage fresh growth and game.

During the same timeframe Pelion Plains was used by sheep and cattle for grazing in the summer, and wild cattle lived in the area until 1948. The cattle were reportedly quite aggressive, and known to attack early bushwalkers.

=== Environmental Protection and Tourism ===
Both Lake St Clair and Cradle Mountain were regarded by European settlers as attractive destinations, with tourist lodges at each location.

In the 1910s Gustav and Kate Cowle began campaigning for the area from Cradle Mountain to Lake St Clair to be a national park. It was declared a scenic reserve in 1922, a wildlife reserve in 1927 and its current designation of national park from 1947. During this transition, former trappers began building huts and guiding bushwalkers, including Paddy Hartnett, Weindorfer and Bob Quaile.

In the 1970s management of the park passed to the newly formed Tasmania Parks and Wildlife Service after the controversial flooding of Lake Pedder.

== Access ==
Access from the south (Lake St. Clair) is usually from Derwent Bridge on the Lyell Highway. Northern access (Cradle Valley) is usually via Sheffield, Wilmot or Mole Creek. A less frequently used entrance is via the Arm River Track, from the east.

=== Usage fee ===
In 2005, the Tasmanian Parks and Wildlife Service introduced a booking system and fee for use of the Overland Track over peak periods. Initially the fee was $100, but this was raised to $150 in 2007, and as at May 2023 is $200. The money that is collected is used to finance the park ranger organisation, track maintenance, building of new facilities and rental of helicopter transport to remove waste from the toilets at the huts in the park.

=== Development ===
The Tasmanian Government has moved to allow development in national parks and conservations areas. An 'In principle' permit has been granted for the establishment of an 'eco-friendly' resort at Pumphouse Point at Lake St Clair.

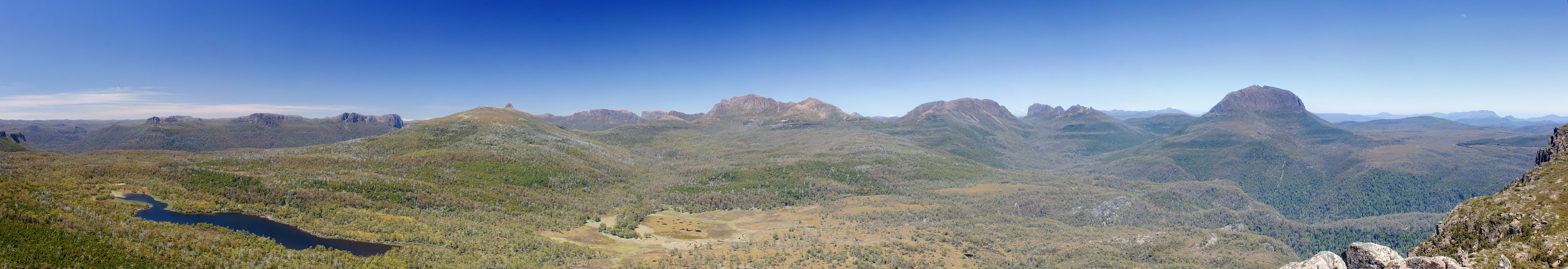
Panorama of the Pelion Range from Mount Oakleigh, Cradle Mountain, Lake St Clair National Park

== Climate ==
Climate data for Cradle Valley, Tasmania
Month	Jan	Feb	Mar	Apr	May	Jun	Jul	Aug	Sep	Oct	Nov	Dec	Year
Record high °C (°F)	30.0 (86.0)	30.5 (86.9)	25.1 (77.2)	20.0 (68.0)	17.8 (64.0)	11.1 (52.0)	11.5 (52.7)	12.7 (54.9)	17.9 (64.2)	19.9 (67.8)	22.0 (71.6)	27.0 (80.6)	30.5 (86.9)
Mean daily maximum °C (°F)	16.6 (61.9)	17.0 (62.6)	14.4 (57.9)	10.8 (51.4)	7.9 (46.2)	5.1 (41.2)	4.6 (40.3)	4.9 (40.8)	7.5 (45.5)	10.5 (50.9)	12.8 (55.0)	15.2 (59.4)	10.6 (51.1)
Mean daily minimum °C (°F)	5.2 (41.4)	5.9 (42.6)	4.7 (40.5)	3.1 (37.6)	1.5 (34.7)	−0.2 (31.6)	−0.2 (31.6)	−0.5 (31.1)	0.3 (32.5)	1.5 (34.7)	2.5 (36.5)	4.1 (39.4)	2.3 (36.1)
Record low °C (°F)	−1.0 (30.2)	−1.9 (28.6)	−2.5 (27.5)	−4.0 (24.8)	−8.3 (17.1)	−8.3 (17.1)	−7.8 (18.0)	−8.5 (16.7)	−8.0 (17.6)	−5.0 (23.0)	−3.5 (25.7)	−1.3 (29.7)	−8.5 (16.7)
Average rainfall mm (inches)	148.8 (5.86)	121.9 (4.80)	148.1 (5.83)	204.1 (8.04)	276.4 (10.88)	272.3 (10.72)	315.7 (12.43)	301.7 (11.88)	269.4 (10.61)	252.4 (9.94)	205.1 (8.07)	181.7 (7.15)	2,815.8 (110.86)
Source: Bureau of Meteorology

Climate data for Lake St. Clair National Park, Tasmania
Month	Jan	Feb	Mar	Apr	May	Jun	Jul	Aug	Sep	Oct	Nov	Dec	Year
Record high °C (°F)	33.0 (91.4)	31.9 (89.4)	30.2 (86.4)	23.2 (73.8)	21.7 (71.1)	14.2 (57.6)	13.1 (55.6)	17.0 (62.6)	20.4 (68.7)	25.7 (78.3)	28.0 (82.4)	32.6 (90.7)	33.0 (91.4)
Mean daily maximum °C (°F)	19.3 (66.7)	19.2 (66.6)	16.6 (61.9)	13.0 (55.4)	10.3 (50.5)	7.7 (45.9)	7.3 (45.1)	8.2 (46.8)	10.0 (50.0)	12.6 (54.7)	15.5 (59.9)	17.3 (63.1)	13.1 (55.6)
Mean daily minimum °C (°F)	6.3 (43.3)	5.9 (42.6)	4.2 (39.6)	2.8 (37.0)	1.6 (34.9)	0.2 (32.4)	−0.1 (31.8)	0.3 (32.5)	0.9 (33.6)	2.0 (35.6)	3.6 (38.5)	5.0 (41.0)	2.8 (37.0)
Record low °C (°F)	−2.5 (27.5)	−4.0 (24.8)	−4.1 (24.6)	−5.0 (23.0)	−6.0 (21.2)	−7.0 (19.4)	−7.2 (19.0)	−7.0 (19.4)	−6.2 (20.8)	−6.5 (20.3)	−4.0 (24.8)	−2.6 (27.3)	−7.2 (19.0)
Average rainfall mm (inches)	101.7 (4.00)	83.6 (3.29)	107.1 (4.22)	135.0 (5.31)	157.1 (6.19)	172.8 (6.80)	205.3 (8.08)	247.6 (9.75)	217.2 (8.55)	175.2 (6.90)	136.2 (5.36)	130.8 (5.15)	1,868.3 (73.56)
Source: Bureau of Meteorology

== Biodiversity ==
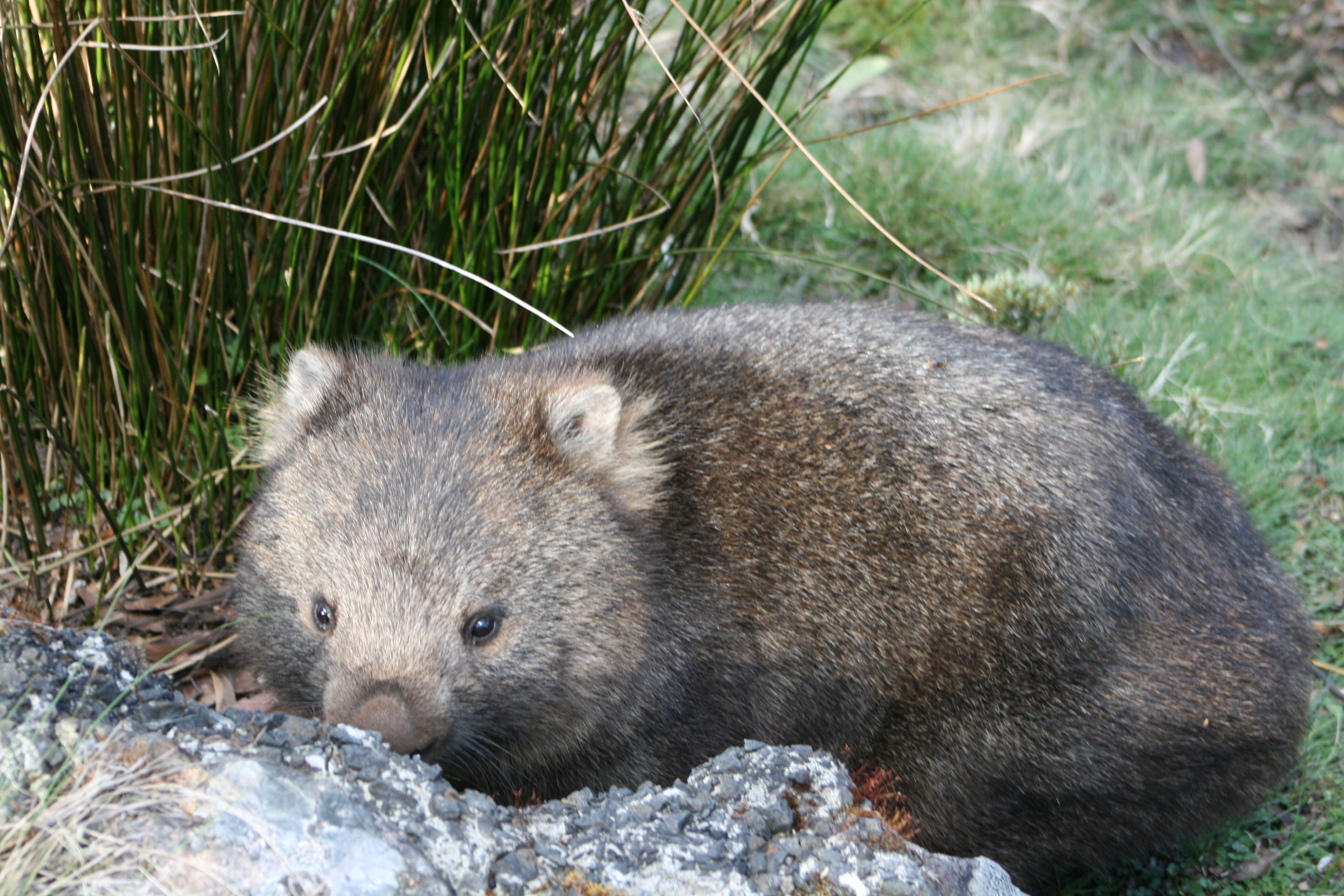
Wombat in the National Park

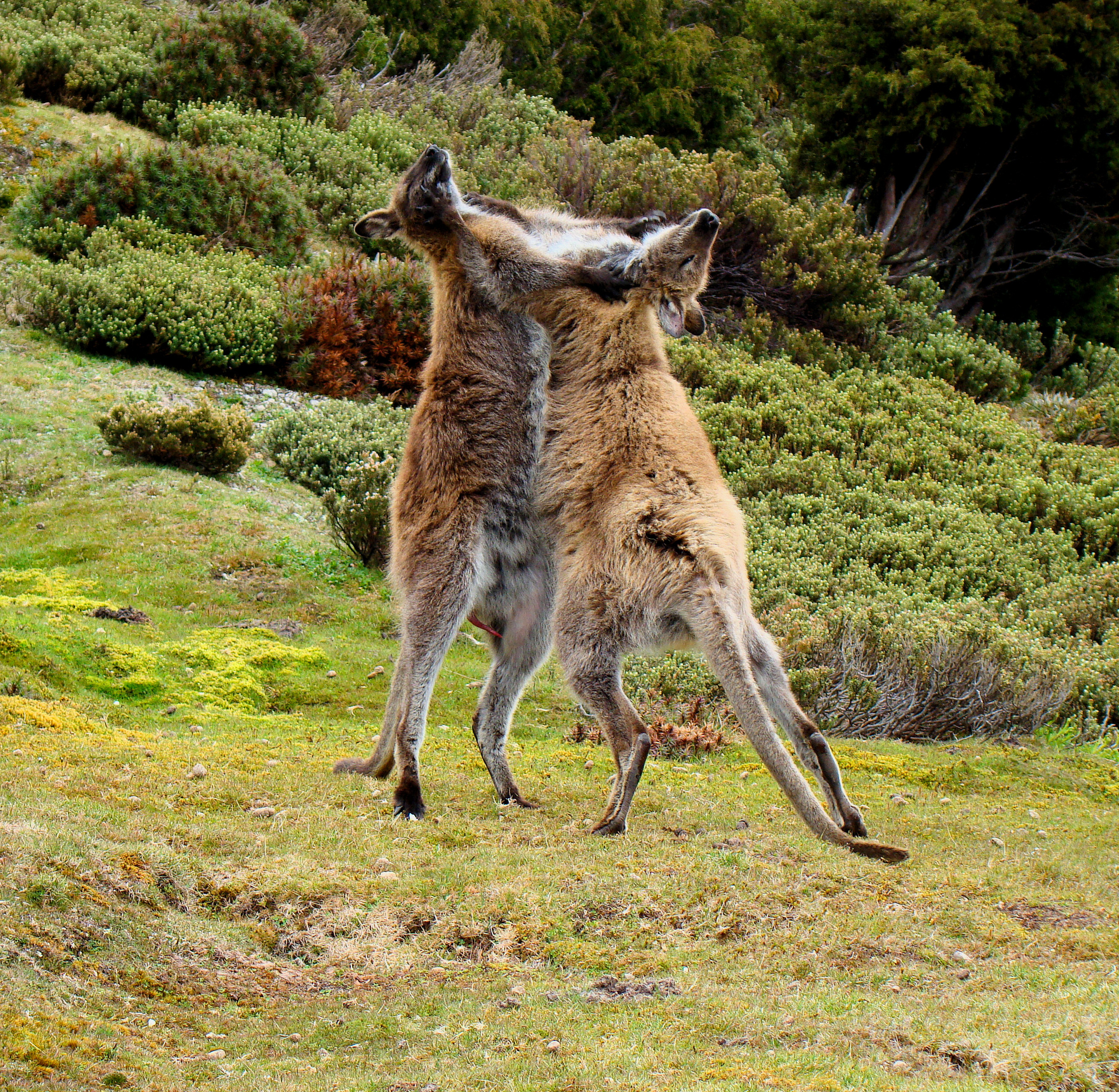
Two male red-necked wallabies fighting near Mount Ossa

The Cradle Mountain–Lake St Clair National Park is a significant location of Tasmania's endemic species – 40–55% of the park's documented alpine flora is endemic. Furthermore, 68% of the higher rainforest species recorded in alpine areas in Tasmania are present in the Cradle Mountain–Lake St Clair National Park. The park's alpine vegetation is very diverse and has largely escaped forest fires that have caused neighbouring regions to suffer.

Animals present in the park include: Tasmanian pademelons, Bennett's wallabies, quolls, Tasmanian devils, short-beaked echidnas, platypuses, common wombats, possums, forest ravens and currawongs.

=== Birds ===
The park has been identified as an Important Bird Area (IBA) because it provides habitat for 11 of Tasmania's endemic bird species, as well as for the flame and pink robins and the striated fieldwren. The IBA is important as a representative protected area in north-central Tasmania for those species.

=== Fungi ===
Fungi are also a part of the Park's biodiversity. While the Management Plan for Cradle Mountain–Lake St Clair National Park only mentions fungi in the context of their destructive effects (Phytophthora cinnamomi and Chalara australis), the Park has a great variety of fungi that perform beneficial ecological roles. In fact, most fungi perform positive rather than negative roles. Even parasitic fungi – often regarded only negatively – are a vital part of healthy ecosystems, regulating ecosystem functions.

As primary recyclers of organic matter, saprobic fungi break down fallen branches and leaf litter, making vital nutrients available to other organisms. Other fungi form symbiotic relationships with other organisms. Although rarely acknowledged, the great majority of plants in Cradle Mountain–Lake St Clair National Park (indeed in the world) form mutually beneficial mycorrhizal relationships with fungi.

Given the great diversity of plants, specialist habitats and micro-climates in the park, a great diversity of fungi, including lichens, is also expected to occur there. Several hundred species have already been recorded by field naturalists and interested individuals and can be found in the Atlas of Living Australia.

Despite their essential roles in underpinning terrestrial ecosystems, fungi are barely recognised as a vital part of Australia's biodiversity. Although Australia has national and state level biodiversity conservation strategies and has ratified international conventions, most overlook fungi, including Tasmania's Natural Heritage Strategy, which only makes one generic reference to fungi.

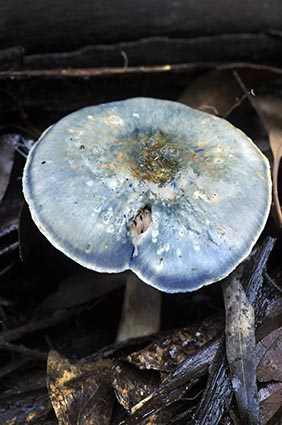
Cortinarius metallicus

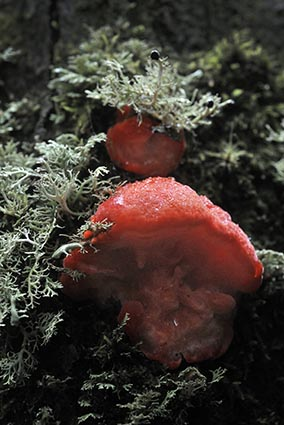
Tyromyces pulcherrimus

One of the more a conspicuous species found in the wetter parts of the park is the strawberry bracket fungus (Tyromyces pulcherrimus). It grows on myrtle beech (Nothofagus cunninghammii) and snow gums. The Australian citizen-science organisation, Fungimap is documenting and mapping the distribution of fungi including those that occur in National Parks. Cortinarius metallicus is a mycorrhizal species also found in the park.

== In film ==
This area was used to film scenes for the prehistoric life documentaries Walking with Dinosaurs and When Dinosaurs Roamed America.

== See also ==
- Gustav Weindorfer
- Protected areas of Tasmania
