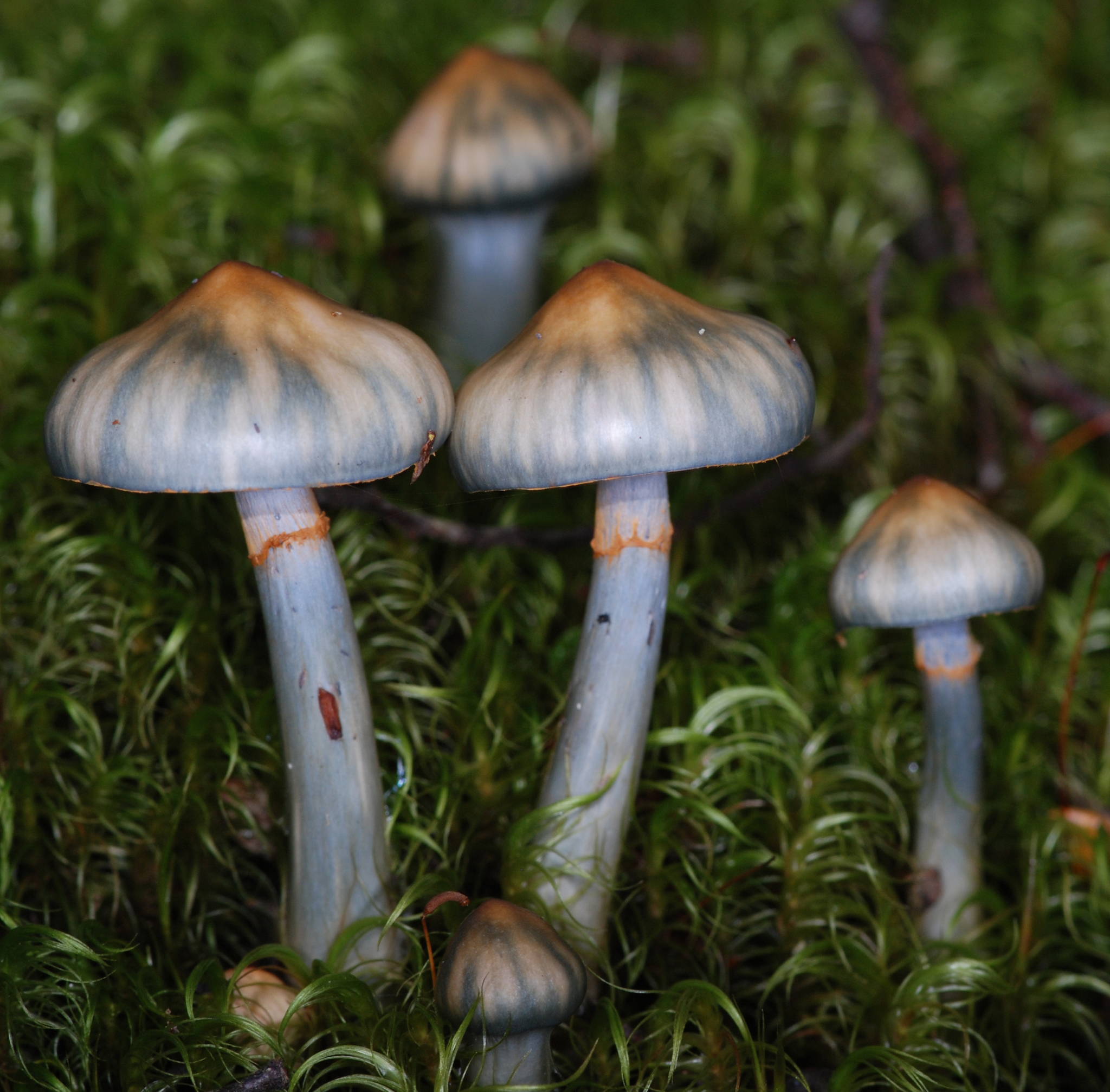

Scientific classification
- Kingdom: Fungi
- Division: Basidiomycota
- Class: Agaricomycetes
- Order: Agaricales
- Family: Cortinariaceae
- Genus: Cortinarius
- Species: C. aerugineoconicus

Binomial name
- Cortinarius aerugineoconicus E. Horak 1990

= Cortinarius aerugineoconicus =

Species of fungus

Cortinarius aerugineoconicus
- Mycological characteristics
- Gills on hymenium
- Cap is convex or depressed
- Hymenium is emarginate
- Stipe has a cortina
- Spore print is reddish-brown
- Ecology is mycorrhizal
- Edibility is unknown

Cortinarius aerugineoconicus is a species of basidiomycete fungus in the genus Cortinarius. It is native to Aotearoa New Zealand, where it grows under southern beech trees.

== Taxonomy ==
This species was first described by Egon Horak in 1990, who collected the holotype specimen on Tākaka Hill, Mt Evans, Nelson in 1969. It is part of the subgenus Myxacium, which is characterized by a glutinous to viscid veil. It was placed in Section Entheosi alongside another New Zealand species Cortinarius entheosus in 2019.

== Description ==
The pileus of Cortinarius aerugineoconicus is up to 50mm in diameter and hygrophanous. In young specimens, it is hemispheric with an incurved margin, and has a steel blue colour often with a green or olive tinge. In mature specimens, it becomes convex to depressed, and fades to yellow or ochre from the centre outwards. The pileus typically has a prominent conical papilla (in both young and old specimens). It is glutinous to viscid in wet conditions, but dries metallic to micaceous. The lamellae are crowded and emarginately attached. They fade from pale blue to rust brown with age. The gill margin is concolorous and entire or subcrenulate. The stipe is up to 80mm long, up to 12mm wide, centrally attached, fusoid to subclavate, and single or cespitose. It has a fibrillose surface with an often poorly developed cortina, and becomes hollow with age. The stipe and stipe context blend from pale blue into yellowish white towards the base, which is typically covered by gluten of yellow or pale ochre. The pileus context has an orange ochre colour directly beneath the pileipellis. The spores are 7.5-9.5μm by 4.5-5.0μm, rust brown (as is the spore print), coarsely verrucose, and amygdaliform to subfusoid. The pileus tissue shows no reaction to ammonia, but stains violaceous with hydrochloric acid and potassium hydroxide. C. aerugineoconicus is indistinct in odour and mild in taste.

This species may be mistaken for Cortinarius rotundisporus. However, C. aerugineoconicus is associated with Nothofagus, whereas C. rotundisporus is associated with Leptospermum. Otherwise, spore shape and size are the most distinctive features to differentiate them, as the spores of C. rotundisporus are roughly 6μm by 8μm and globose to subglobose.

== Habitat and distribution ==
Cortinarius aerugineoconicus occurs in mixed broad-leaf and conifer forests, and grows on soil among litter. It is widely distributed across the South Island of New Zealand with recorded specimens as far north as Nelson and as far south as Fiordland. Specimens have also been recorded on the North Island in Gisborne.

This species forms ectomycorrhizal associations with Nothofagus trees, including red beech (N. fusca), silver beech (N. menziesii), mountain beech (N. solandri var. cliffortioides), hard beech (N. truncata), and black beech (N. solandri).

== Etymology ==
The specific epithet aerugineoconicus is derived from the Latin aerūgō meaning ‘rust of copper, verdigris’, neo- meaning ‘new, young’, and conicus meaning ‘conical’. This refers to the appearance of the young pileus – its blue-green colour resembles the rust that forms on copper-containing metals, and its papillate hemispheric shape appears roughly conical.

== See also ==
- List of Cortinarius species
