= Cradle Mountain =

Mountain in Tasmania

- Warloundigerler
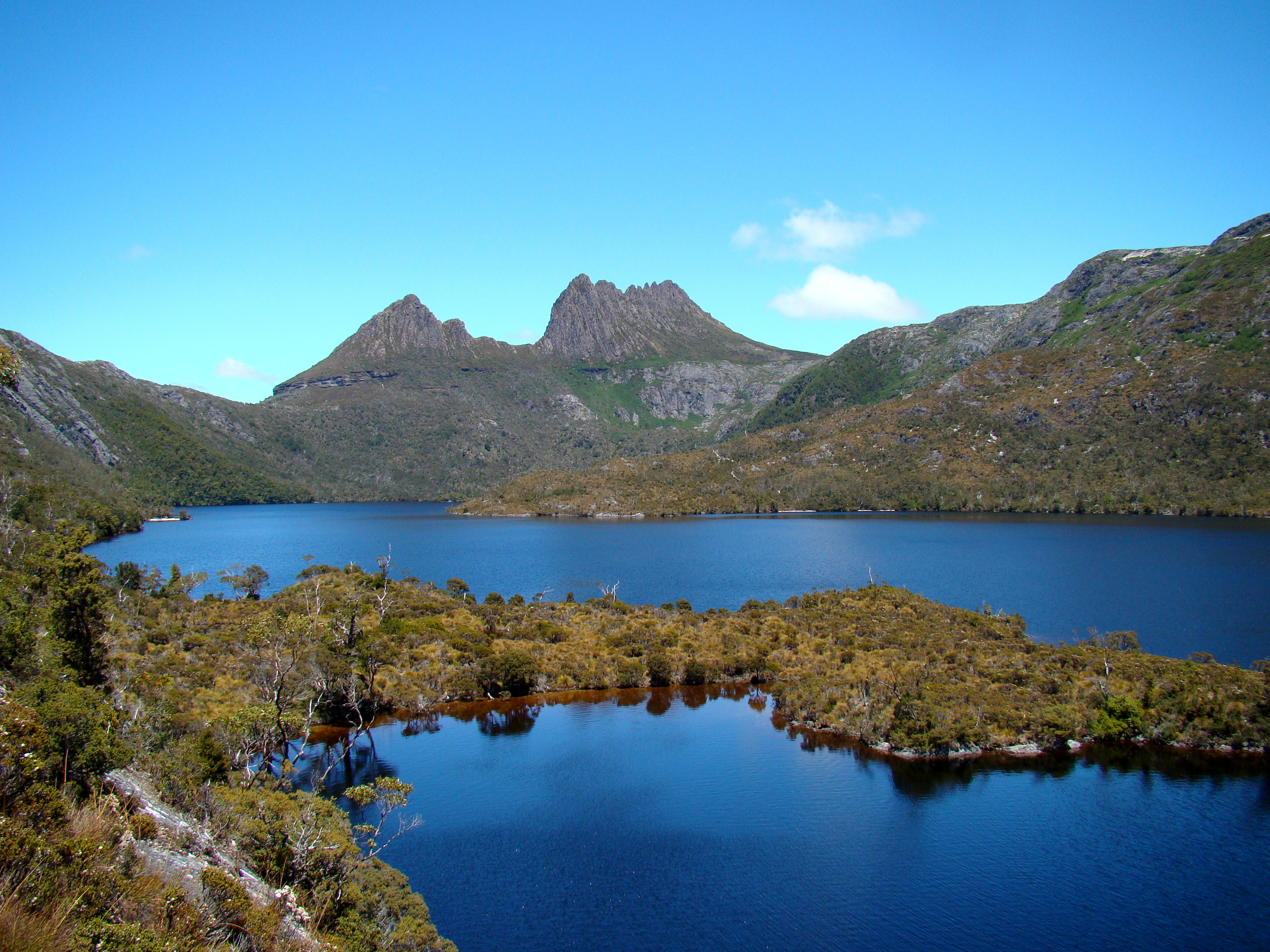
- Cradle Mountain as seen from the north, across Dove Lake

Highest point
- Elevation: 1,545 m (5,069 ft)
- Prominence: 355 m (1,165 ft)
- Isolation: 4.95 km (3.08 mi)
- Listing: 6th-highest mountain in Tasmania
- Coordinates: 41°40′48″S 145°56′24″E

Geography
- Location within Tasmania
- Location: Central Highlands, Tasmania, Australia
- Parent range: Cradle Cirque - Bluff Cirque

Geology
- Rock type: dolerite

Climbing
- Normal route: Walk / hike via the Overland Track

Cradle Mountain is a locality and mountain in the Central Highlands region of the Australian state of Tasmania. The mountain is situated in the Cradle Mountain-Lake St Clair National Park.

At 1,545 metres (5,069 ft) above sea level, it is the sixth-highest mountain in Tasmania.

The locality of Cradle Mountain is a rural locality in the local government areas of Meander Valley, Kentish and West Coast in the Launceston and North-west and west local government regions of Tasmania. The locality is about 109 kilometres (68 mi) west of the town of Westbury. The 2016 census recorded a population of 66 for the state suburb of Cradle Mountain. Cradle Mountain was gazetted as a locality in 1966. Cradle Mountain (the mountain) occupies a small area in the north-west of the locality, which occupies the northern half of Cradle Mountain-Lake St Clair National Park. Route C132 (Cradle Mountain Road / Dove Lake Road) enters from the north and runs south to Dove Lake, where it ends.

== History ==
Cradle Mountain sits between the Big River and Northern Tasmanian Aboriginal people. Aboriginal Tasmanians were persecuted by the European settlers upon their arrival, and the last free Aboriginals in the area were seen just south of Cradle Mountain in 1836.

=== Early European development ===
In 1827 and 1828, the first Europeans to explore and summit Cradle Mountain were Joseph Fossey and Henry Hellyer, who were surveying for the Van Diemen's Land Company.

Trappers worked in the area from the 1860s until the collapse of the fur trade in the 1950s, although hunting in the park was declared illegal after 1927. They established huts, including Du Cane and Pine Valley, and burned the land to encourage fresh growth and game.

A large expanse of King Billy pines were found by James Smith in 1863, and the area was logged until the 1910s. Smith's son continued logging the area on private (but National Park adjacent) land from 1943 to 1972, ending after significant public protest.

Cattle and sheep grazed in Cradle Valley from 1910 to 1930.

=== Environmental protection and tourism ===
In the 1910s Gustav and Kate Cowle climbed Cradle Mountain. They found the land beautiful and Gustav proclaimed "This must be a national park for the people for all time. It is magnificent, and people must know about it and enjoy it".

They began campaigning for the area from Cradle Mountain to Lake St Clair to be a national park, and set up a popular chalet the next year. It was declared a scenic reserve in 1922, a wildlife reserve in 1927 and its current designation of national park from 1947. During this transition former trappers began building huts and guiding bushwalkers, including Paddy Hartnett, Weindorfer and Bob Quaile.

In 1931 fur trapper Bert Nichols blazed the Overland Track starting from Cradle Mountain and heading south to Lake St Clair. By 1935 it was consolidated and used by independent walking parties.

== Geology ==
Cradle Mountain is formed by an igneous dolerite sill that intruded the Permian-Jurassic sedimentary layers, cooling to form a broad hard layer. Subsequent erosion from Pleistocene glaciation left caps of dolerite at Cradle Mountain, and surrounding peaks.

== Access ==
The area around the mountain has a large number of day walks, as well as being one terminus of the Overland Track. The Overland Track winds through a variety of landscapes to its opposite end—80.8 kilometres (50.2 mi) to the south—at Lake St Clair, Australia's deepest lake.

The mountain is climbed by walkers virtually year round. It is a strenuous return hike from the Dove Lake car park with a recommended allotted time of six-and-a-half hours. The climb up the rocky part of the mountain involves scrambling over large boulders for several hundred metres. The entire climb is exposed to any bad weather that may arrive quickly, while climbing the upper slopes in winter can be dangerous due to slick ice on the rocks and heavy snow covering holes and other hazards. From the summit, there are views of Dove Lake, Barn Bluff and Mount Ossa.

== Climate ==
The area has a Subpolar oceanic climate (Cfc) with cool summers and cold, very snowy winters; with heavy precipitation throughout the year which peaks distinctly in the winter months. Climate data are sourced from an altitude of 903 metres (2,963 ft) on the exposed western slopes. It receives an average of 47.9 snowy days annually, which can occur in any month of the year.

Climate data for Cradle Valley (Waldheim, 1926–1977, rainfall 1917–2009); 903 m AMSL; 41.64° S, 145.94° E
Month	Jan	Feb	Mar	Apr	May	Jun	Jul	Aug	Sep	Oct	Nov	Dec	Year
Record high °C (°F)	30.0 (86.0)	30.5 (86.9)	25.1 (77.2)	20.0 (68.0)	17.8 (64.0)	11.1 (52.0)	11.5 (52.7)	12.7 (54.9)	17.9 (64.2)	19.9 (67.8)	22.0 (71.6)	27.0 (80.6)	30.5 (86.9)
Mean daily maximum °C (°F)	16.6 (61.9)	17.0 (62.6)	14.4 (57.9)	10.8 (51.4)	7.9 (46.2)	5.1 (41.2)	4.6 (40.3)	4.9 (40.8)	7.5 (45.5)	10.5 (50.9)	12.8 (55.0)	15.2 (59.4)	10.6 (51.1)
Mean daily minimum °C (°F)	5.2 (41.4)	5.9 (42.6)	4.7 (40.5)	3.1 (37.6)	1.5 (34.7)	−0.2 (31.6)	−0.2 (31.6)	−0.5 (31.1)	0.3 (32.5)	1.5 (34.7)	2.5 (36.5)	4.1 (39.4)	2.3 (36.2)
Record low °C (°F)	−1.0 (30.2)	−1.9 (28.6)	−2.5 (27.5)	−4.0 (24.8)	−8.3 (17.1)	−8.3 (17.1)	−7.8 (18.0)	−8.5 (16.7)	−8.0 (17.6)	−5.0 (23.0)	−3.5 (25.7)	−1.3 (29.7)	−8.5 (16.7)
Average precipitation mm (inches)	148.8 (5.86)	121.9 (4.80)	148.1 (5.83)	204.1 (8.04)	276.4 (10.88)	272.3 (10.72)	315.7 (12.43)	301.7 (11.88)	269.4 (10.61)	252.4 (9.94)	205.1 (8.07)	181.7 (7.15)	2,815.8 (110.86)
Average precipitation days (≥ 0.2 mm)	16.9	14.0	17.9	19.1	21.4	22.2	23.3	23.8	21.7	21.4	18.4	18.3	238.4
Average afternoon relative humidity (%)	74	77	84	89	90	92	93	90	85	80	77	74	84
Source: Australian Bureau of Meteorology

== Features ==
The mountain rises above the glacially formed Dove Lake (934 metres [3,064 ft]), Lake Wilks and Crater Lake.

The mountain has four named summits. In order of height they are Cradle Mountain (1,545 m [5,069 ft]), Smithies Peak (1,527 m [5,010 ft]), Weindorfers Tower (1,459 metres [4,787 ft]) and Little Horn (1,355 m [4,446 ft]).

The mountain itself is named after its resemblance to a gold-mining cradle.

The relative heights of nearby peaks were measured in 1916.

== Flora, fauna and fungi ==
=== Flora ===
The area is covered in a variety of alpine and sub-alpine vegetation, including the colourful deciduous beech, itself an anomaly given that most Australian native flora is evergreen. Alpine coral fern and button grass dominate the alpine wet sedgelands near the mountain summit. Stands of Tasmanian snow gum can be found at slightly lower elevations alongside Tasmanian eyebright, scoparia heath, mountain rocket, waratah, Cheshunt pine and pencil pine. Within the valleys surrounding the mountain, species such as myrtle beech, pandani, sassafras, King Billy pine and celery top pine form thick temperate rainforest with dense, mossy undergrowth.

=== Fauna ===
Wombats are a common sight throughout the area, while pademelons, Tasmanian devils and echidnas can also be seen. Bird species in the area include green rosellas, black currawongs, pink robins and Tasmanian scrubwrens, while peregrine falcons and wedge-tailed eagles nest on the mountains cliffs. Tiger snakes are a highly venomous snake species known to be found in the area.

=== Fungi ===
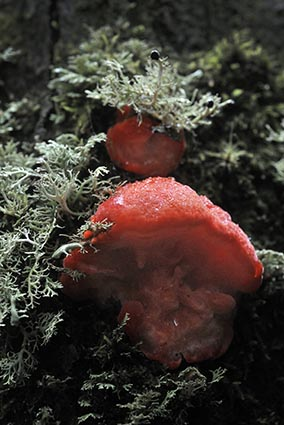
Tyromyces pulcherrimus, strawberry bracket fungus

Fungi are also a part of the park's biodiversity. While the Management Plan from 1999 for Cradle Mountain-Lake St Clair National Park only mentions fungi in the context of their destructive effects (Phytophthora cinnamomi and Chalara australis), the park has a variety of fungi that perform beneficial ecological roles. Parasitic fungi—often regarded negatively—are a vital part of healthy ecosystems, regulating ecosystem functions.

As primary recyclers of organic matter, saprobic fungi break down fallen branches and leaf litter, making vital nutrients available to other organisms. Other fungi form symbiotic relationships with other organisms. Although rarely acknowledged, the great majority of plants in Cradle Mountain-Lake St Clair National Park (and, indeed, in the world) form mutually beneficial mycorrhizal relationships with fungi.

Given the diversity of plants, specialist habitats and micro-climates in the park, a diversity of fungi, including lichens, is also expected to occur. Several hundred species have already been recorded by field naturalists and interested individuals and can be found in the Atlas of Living Australia.

Despite their essential roles in underpinning terrestrial ecosystems, fungi are barely recognised as a vital part of Australia's biodiversity. Although Australia has national and state level biodiversity conservation strategies and has ratified international conventions, most overlook fungi, including Tasmania's Natural Heritage Strategy, which only makes one generic reference to fungi.

One of the more a conspicuous species found in the wetter parts of the park is the strawberry bracket fungus (Tyromyces pulcherrimus). It grows on myrtle beech (Nothofagus cunninghammii) and snow gums. The Australian citizen-science organisation, Fungimap is documenting and mapping the distribution of fungi including those that occur in national parks.

== Gallery ==
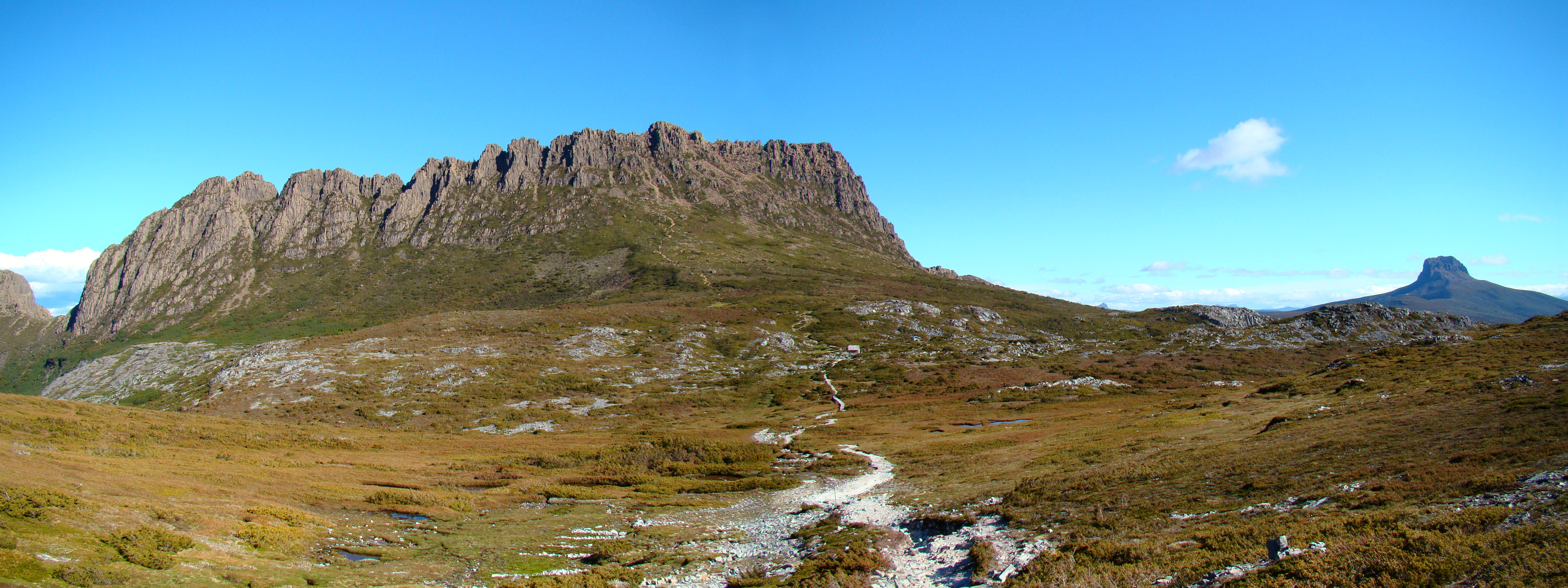
Panorama from west, showing Cradle Mountain and, in the distance, Barn Bluff

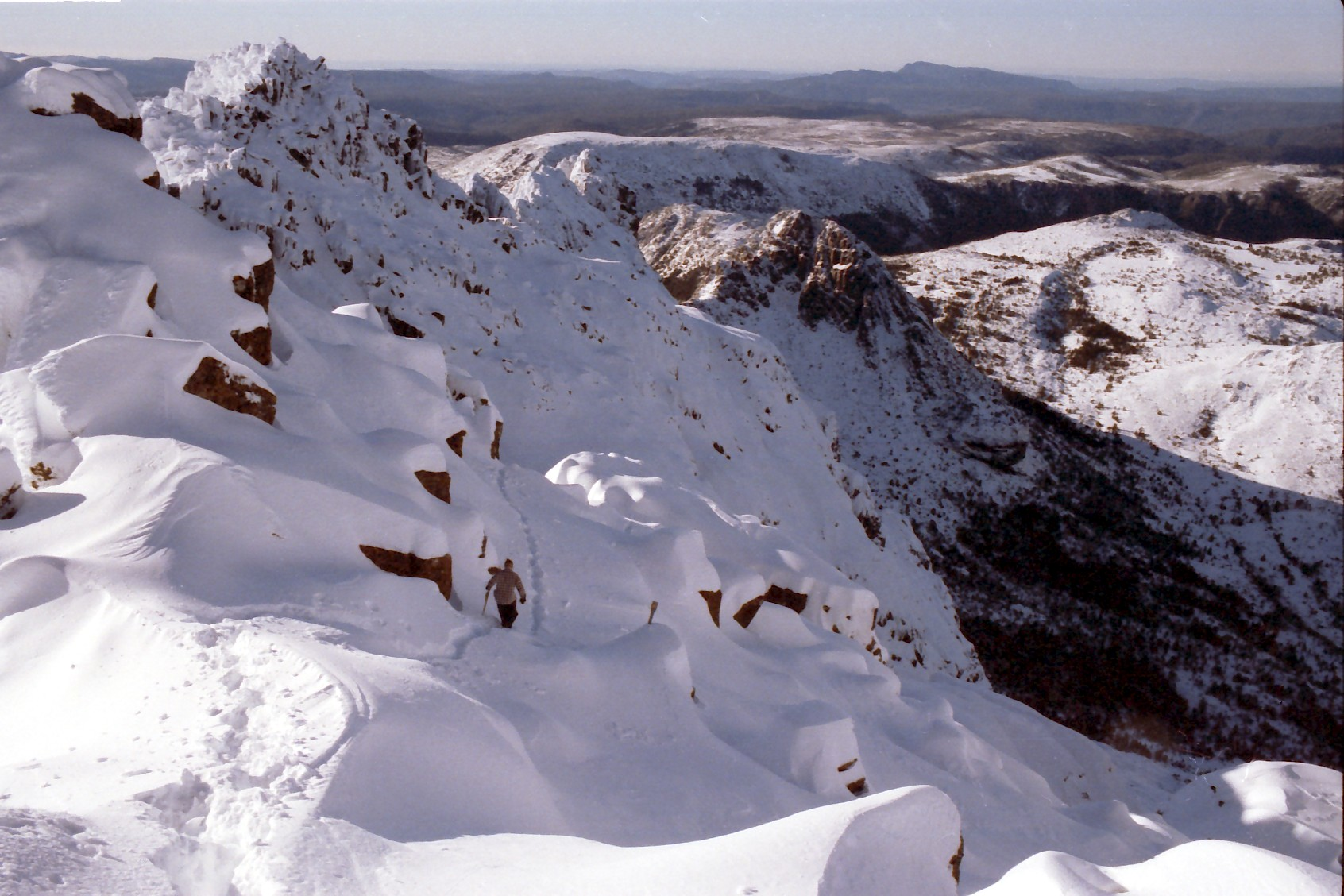
The summit ridge of Cradle Mountain

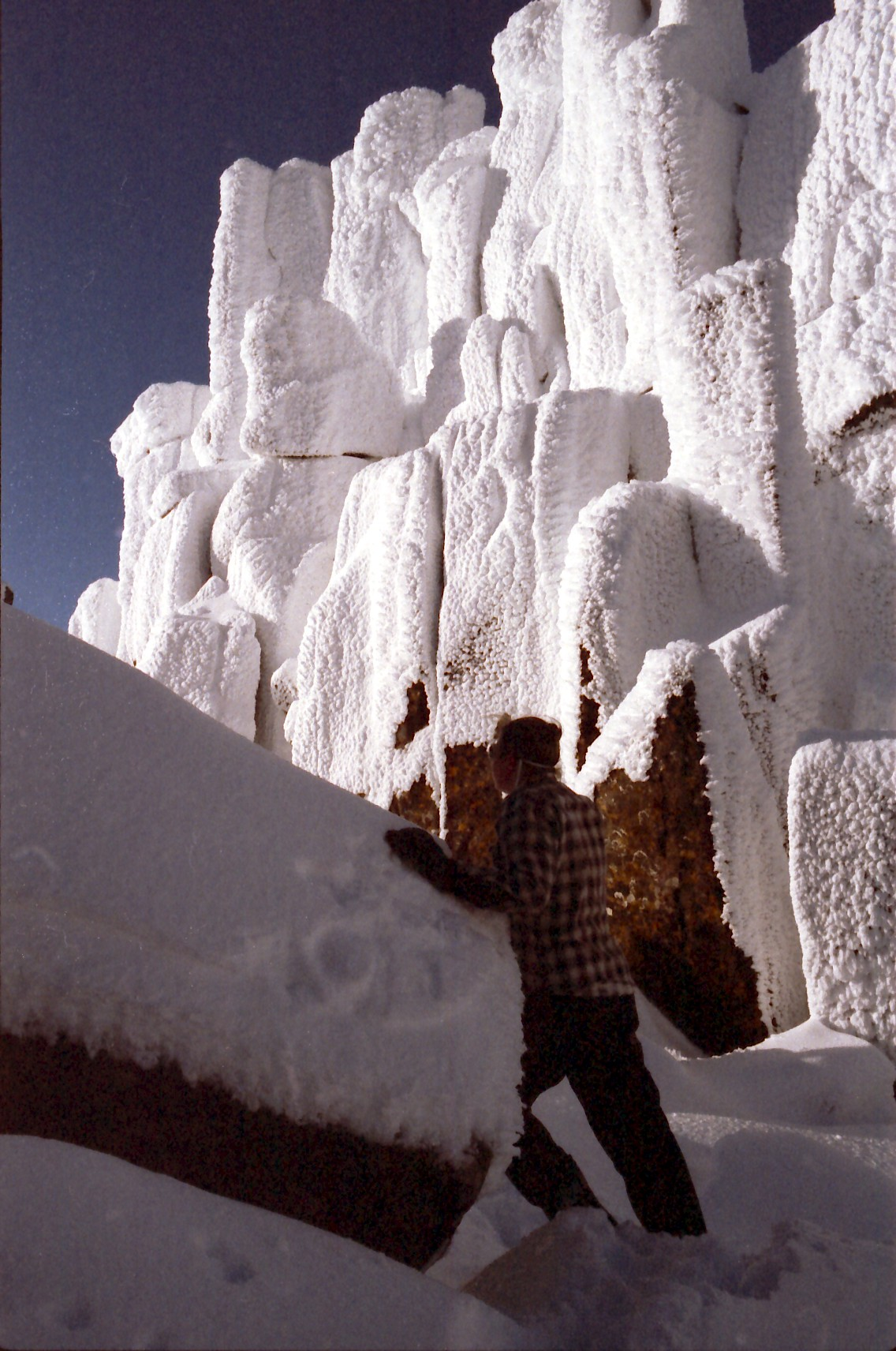
The summit ridge of Cradle Mountain

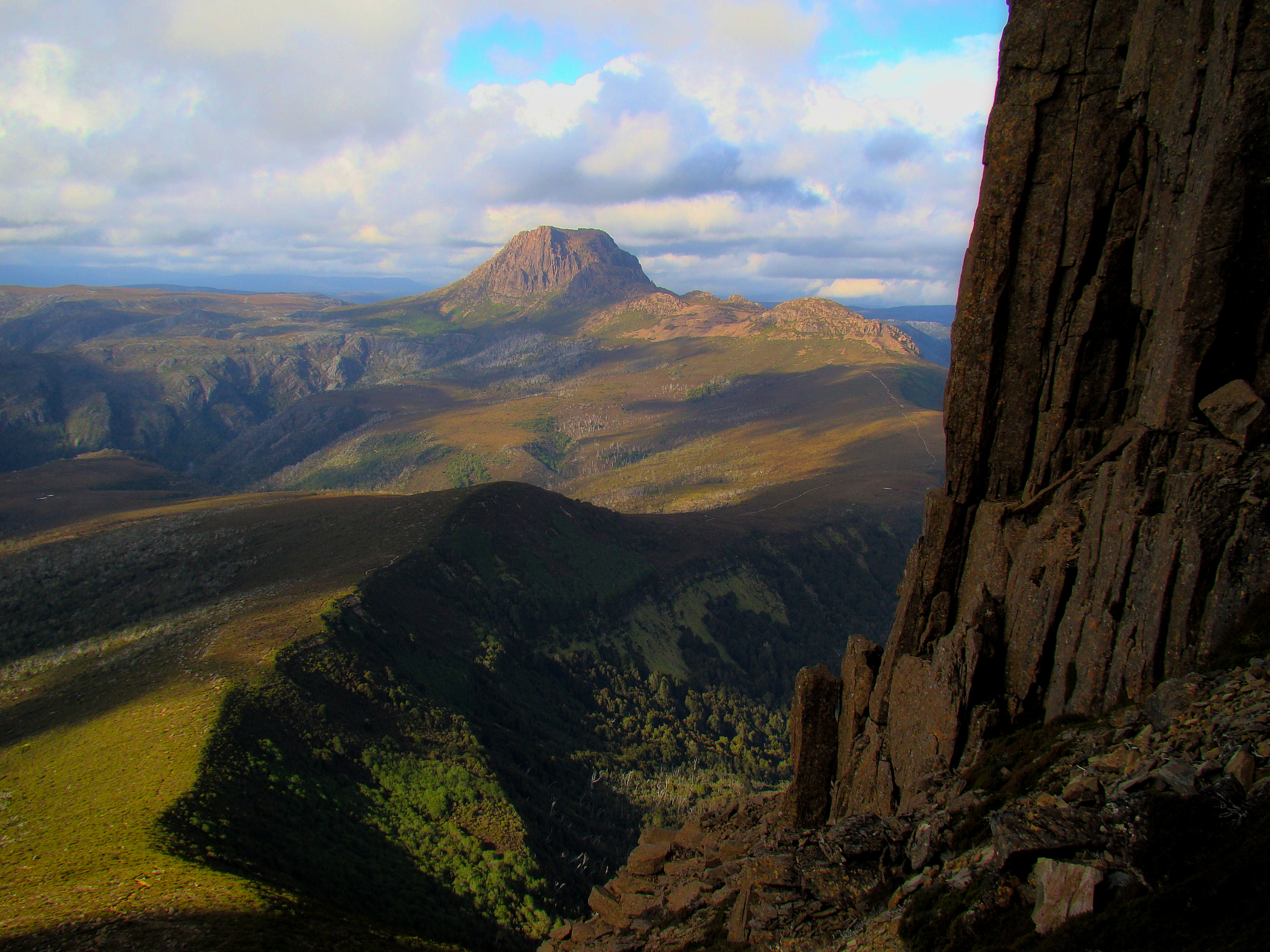
Cradle Mountain seen from neighbouring Barn Bluff

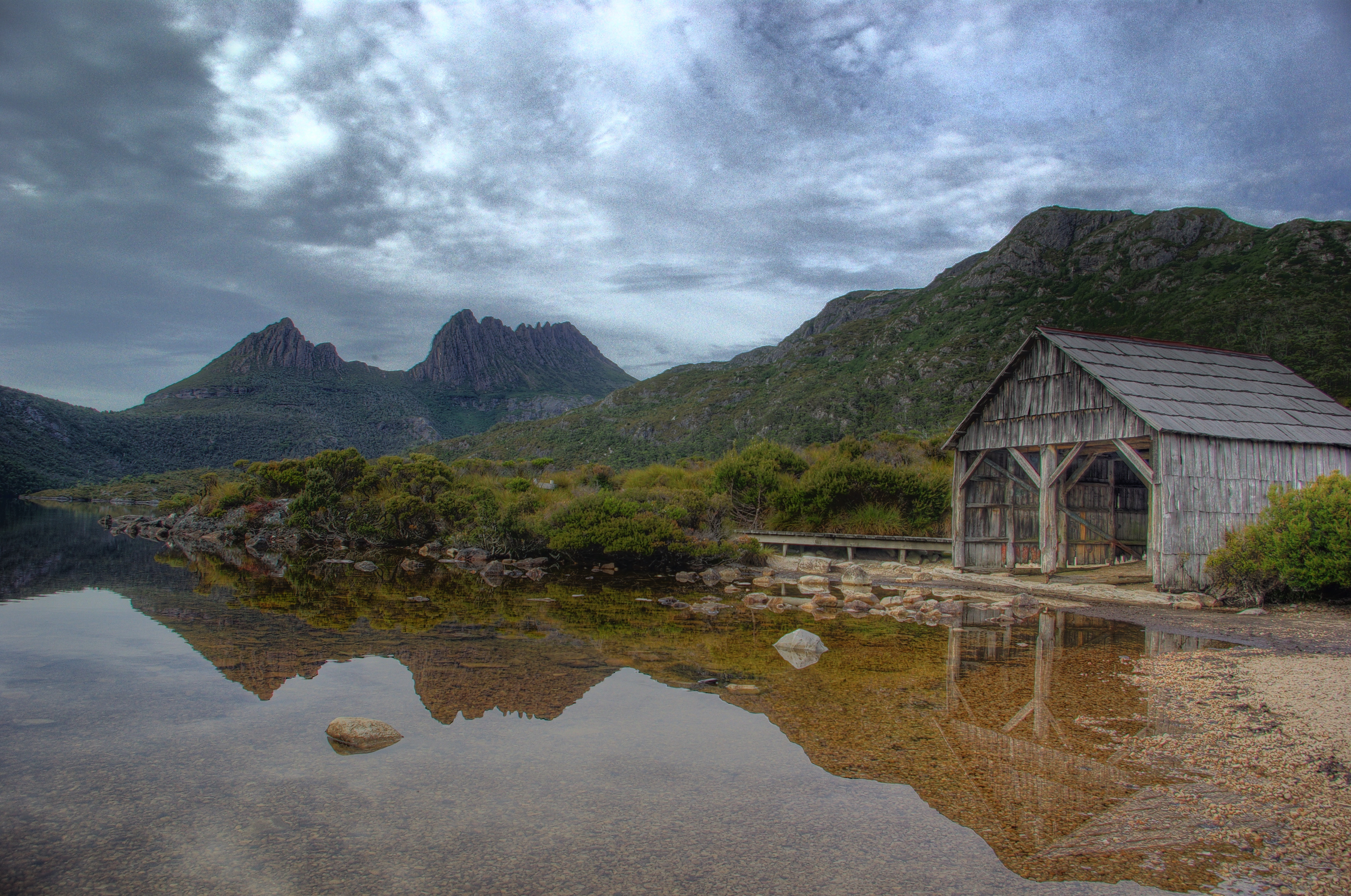
View over Dove Lake; The boat shed was built in the 1940s

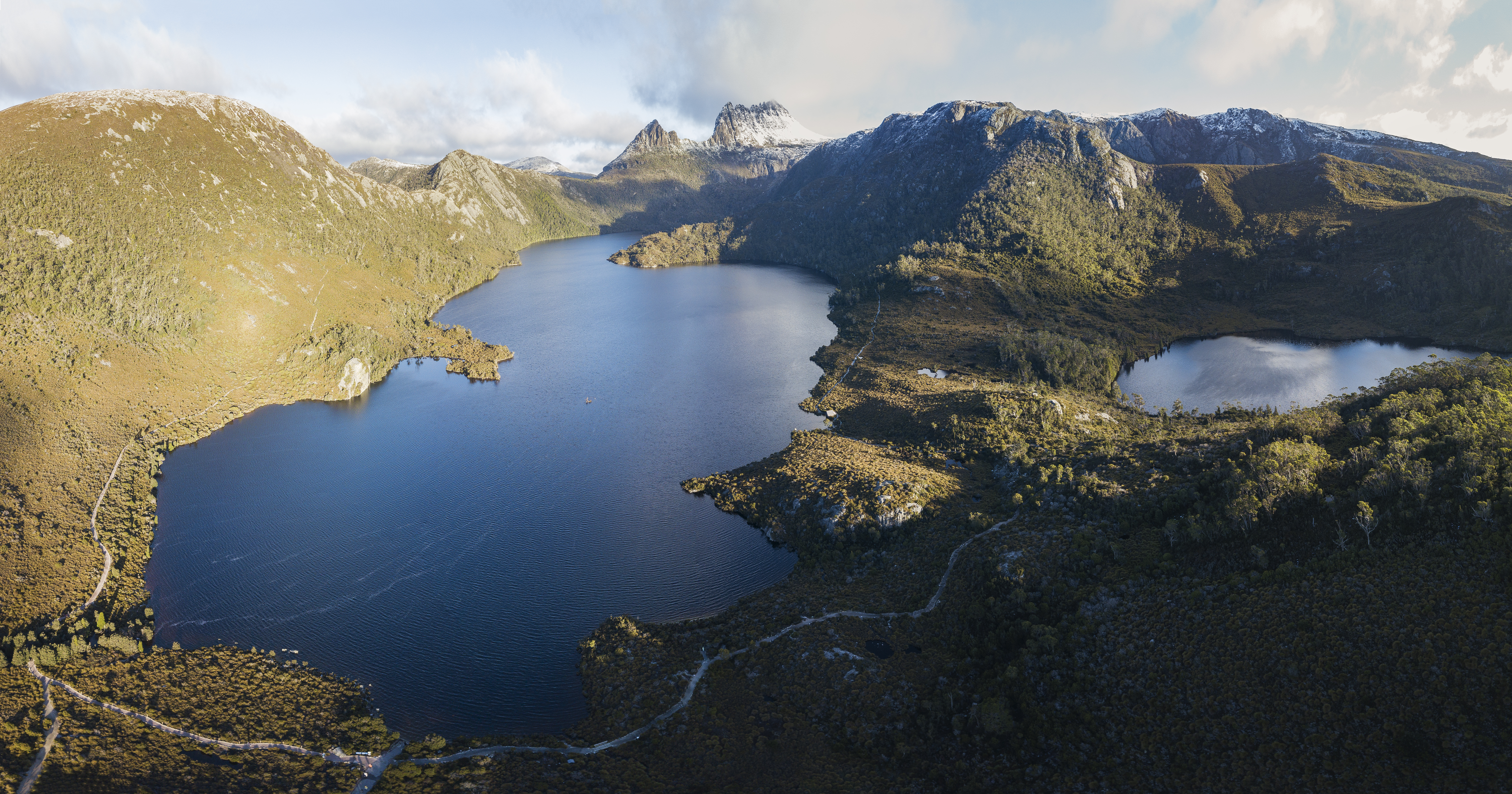
Aerial panorama of Cradle Mountain

== See also ==
- Cradle Mountain-Lake St Clair National Park
- List of highest mountains of Tasmania
