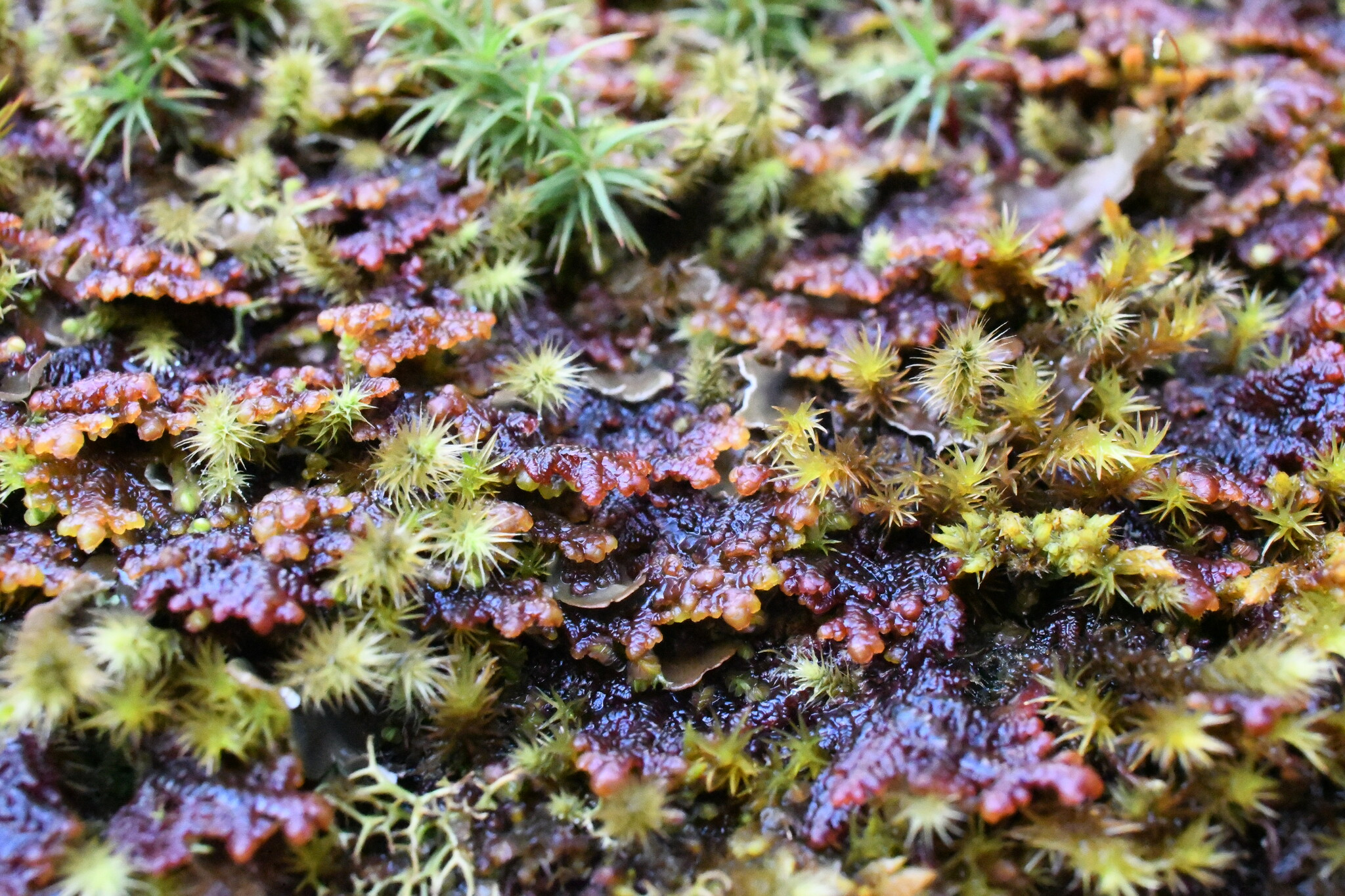

Scientific classification
- Kingdom: Plantae
- Clade: Embryophytes
- Division: Marchantiophyta
- Class: Jungermanniopsida
- Order: Porellales
- Family: Lepidolaenaceae
- Genus: Gackstroemia
- Species: G. weindorferi

Binomial name
- Gackstroemia weindorferi (Herzog) Grolle

Synonyms
- Lepidolaena weindorferi Herzog

= Gackstroemia weindorferi =

Species of liverwort

Gackstroemia weindorferi, commonly lacewort is a species of leafy liverwort in the family Lepidolaenaceae, native to wet forests and temperate rainforests in southeastern Australia and New Zealand. It grows primarily as an epiphyte on tree trunks and decaying wood in moist forest environments.

== Description ==
Gackstroemia weindorferi is a dioicous, medium-sized, intricately branched leafy liverwort. As a liverwort, it is a non-vascular plant that reproduces by spores and forms part of a forest ecosystem's bryophyte community. It is 9-17 mm wide at the widest point between its primary branch tips. Its stem growth is ascending to fully erect, and the plant's branching pattern is typically two pinnate but occasionally three pinnate, which diverge widely from the stem. Older growth is typically rust-red to pale brown, while the growing tips of the plant are a lighter yellow-green. Stems are red in colour and rigid, with a cortex composed of two to four layers of thick-walled pigmented cells surrounding a medulla of thinner-walled cells. Rhizoids develop in clusters at the bases of underleaves on the main stem.

The plant's leaf form changes gradually from branch to stem. Stem leaves are typically around 1–1.4 mm long, spread horizontally or slightly upwards and overlap closely. They are slightly convex, broadly ovate to ovate‑deltoid, and end in a short, sharp apiculus. Leaf margins may be entire or bear small cilia. Often, the cilia are longer and more numerous on the abaxial side. Outer branch leaves are smaller and more heavily fringed with cilia.

Each leaf bears a lobule. On the stem leaves, the lobules are typically flattened (explanate) with reflexed, usually entire margins. On smaller branches they become narrow, sac-like structures with a lateral slit and a long apical cilium. A third structure, the stylus, which is elliptic to ovate or suborbicular, occurs on stem leaves but is absent from the leaves of the branches.

Androecia, the male reproductive structures, occur on secondary and tertiary branches, each with several pairs of bracts, typically three to four, though occasionally up to five. Female structures form a fleshy, cylindrical coelocaule, a protective, specialised stem modification seen in some liverworts, surrounded by overlapping bracts with long marginal cilia. Perianths are cylindrical with a ciliate margin and are sometimes split along the ventral side. The seta can reach 23 mm, bearing a small cylindrical capsule, 2-3 mm in length. Spores are reticulate to areolate.

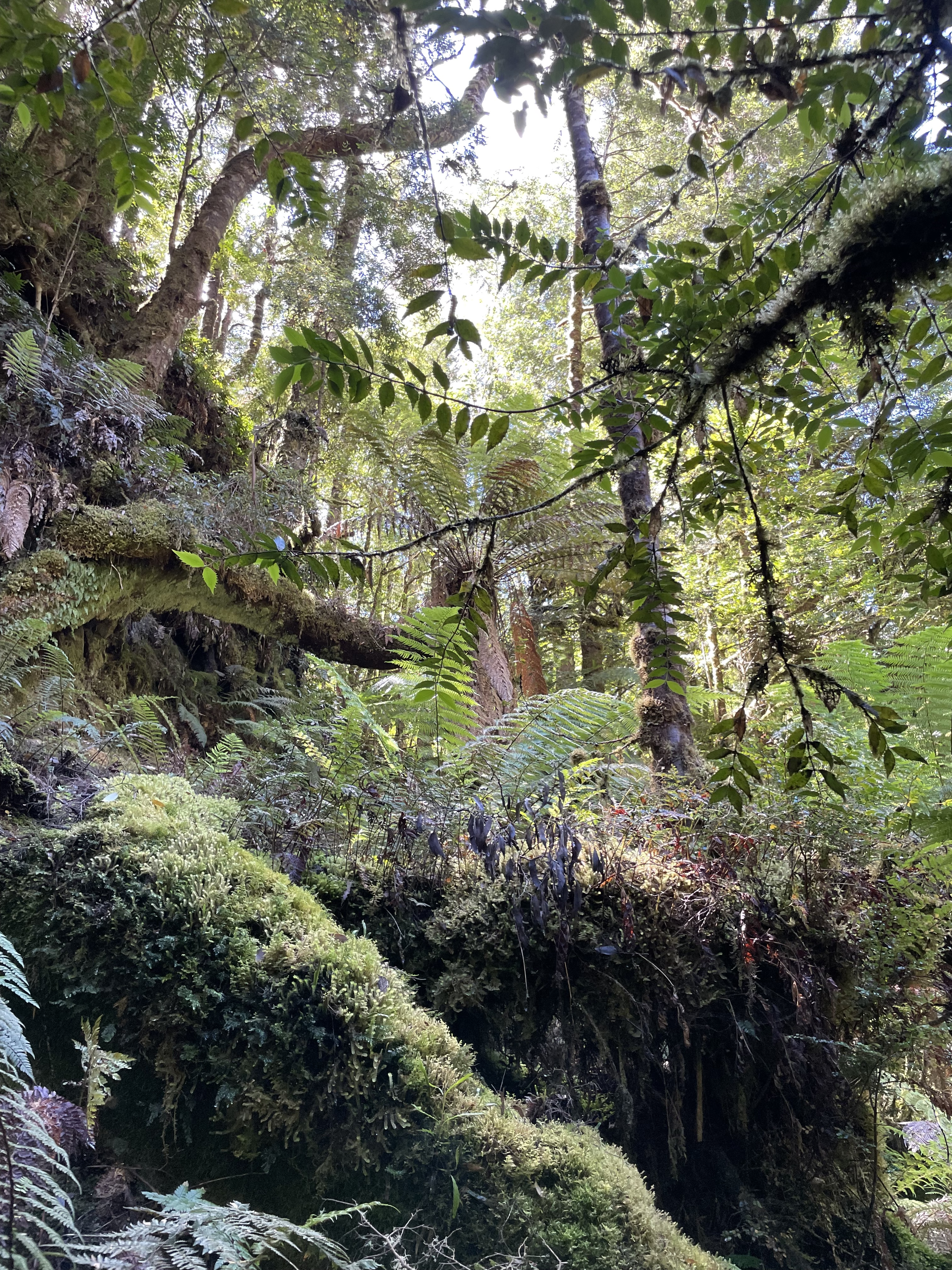
Epiphytic bryophyte growth in a Tasmanian temperate rainforest

== Habitat and distribution ==
Gackstroemia weindorferi occurs in New Zealand and in the southeastern Australian states of Victoria, New South Wales and Tasmania. In Victoria, it is particularly associated with forested regions such as Gippsland, the Yarra Ranges and the Otway Ranges and also occurs in sheltered, wet sites in alpine or montane environments. In New Zealand Gackstroemia weindorferi has been observed on Stewart Island, the South Island and at high altitude (1200-1280 m) on the North Island. It is widespread in wet forests and temperate rainforests.

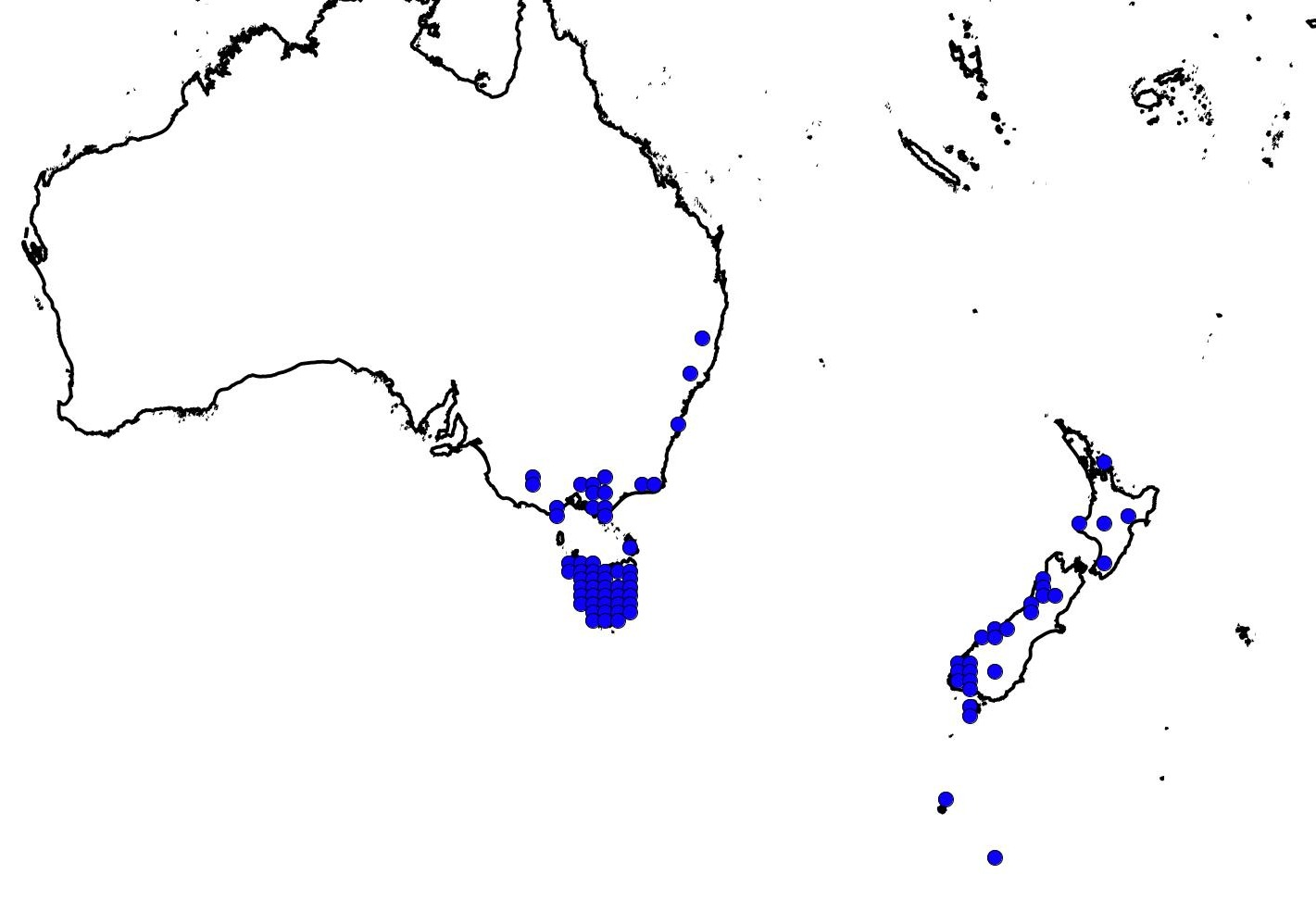
Distribution of Gackstroemia weindorferi across Australia and New Zealand

Gackstroemia weindorferi, as is typical for leafy liverworts, most frequently grows as an epiphyte on tree trunks or fallen logs, including Lagarostrobos franklinii. Less commonly, it grows as a lithophyte or directly on soil.

== Taxonomy ==
Gackstroemia weindorferi was named for Austrian-Australian botanist and naturalist Gustav Weindorfer. The species was originally described as Lepidolaena weindorferi in 1933 and was reclassified in 1967. The two names are considered synonymous.

The New Zealand endemic Lepidolaenaceae species Gackstroemia novae-zelandiae was previously included with Gackstroemia weindorferi. It was classified separately in 2013.
