= Kate Cowle =

Australian female pioneer and naturalist (1863–1916)

Kate Julia Cowle (19 July 1863 – 29 April 1916) was the first recorded Australian female to trek to the top of Cradle Mountain, Tasmania, in 1910. A pioneering naturalist and conservationist, she summited the mountain along with her fellow climbers Gustav Weindorfer, Ron Smith and Walter Malcolm Black.

== Background ==
Cowle was born 19 July 1863 at Cullenswood near Fingal, Tasmania, one of 9 children and became an accomplished musician, performing publicly in Devonport, Tasmania as a pianist. After gaining financial independence with an inheritance from her father's estate, she moved to Melbourne where she joined the Field Naturalists Club of Victoria in 1902. One evening, as the first female to give a paper to the Naturalists, she spoke about botany and the geology of Mount Roland, just 29 km from Cradle Mountain. Talking about the vegetation experienced on her climb she notably conveyed the "Tug on her heart as the silent outreach of the soul toward eternal beauty". Her climbing and exploration of this remote area would all have been carried out in less suitable mountaineering attire as was common in the day of an ankle length skirt, bodice long sleeve shirt and stout boots.

In the audience for her presentation at the club was her future husband, Austrian emigrant, Gustav Weindorfer. Gustav was well read about forestry and Australian exploration history. Botany, flowers and love of the bush led to their union and subsequent marriage in 1906. The day before their wedding, there was a fire and the men, including Gustav spent the evening protecting Cowle's brother's Stowport property. Although the fire damage required a relocation of their wedding, undeterred it went ahead. Their honeymoon consisted of exploring and camping on Mount Roland in a tent for six weeks enjoying Kangaroo tail soup, foraging in the flora and enduring the elements including blizzard conditions. Thus began their future together of trekking to explore and subsequently promote the mountain area as 'a veritable El Dorado for Botanists'.

In 1911, her love for the area lead Cowle to purchase 200 acres of Crown Land at Cradle Mountain on which later Gustav would build their chalet, "Waldheim". Inspired by treks the couple did throughout the area and including Mt Buffalo in Victoria they wanted to build a chalet to live in and host naturalists, botanists and tourists to help realize their original vision. It was built in a protected part of the Cradle Mountain area with already fallen trees from around the location, primarily King Billy Pine. It was a work in progress over time which saw the addition of a bath house with a caldron that eventually provided warm water for the inhabitants. The Weindorfers built and decorated it to attract friends, other passionate naturalists and advocates for conservation. Whilst friends and mountaineers were more easily attracted to travel to this remote location, with no roads and amenities, it took some time to lure other tourists to embrace the hardships of mountain life.

As a naturalist, Cowle's favourite species were the small lichens, decaying logs with mosses and small plant life. But she spent a lot of her time on the farm they had bought together while Gustav worked on the chalet, Waldheim. During these long separations, they kept in touch via letters even though the trek down the mountain was 47 miles to where the mail was delivered for Gustav. The love story of the couple, botanic and conservation work for the Cradle Mountain area and the hardships endured as pioneers was researched by Kate Legge, resulting in her 2019 book, Kindred: A Cradle Mountain Love Story.

== Death ==
In 1915, she started having chest pains, first diagnosed as indigestion, they found a lump in her chest which triggered a downward spiral in her health. She died on 29 April 1916 in Devonport, Tasmania. She was 52 at the time of her death, leaving Gustav to complete the work they commenced together.

In 2024 Kates remains were exhumed from The Don, near Devonport and reinterred with Gustav at Cradle Valley.

== Declared sanctuary ==
A group of photographers in 1920 took photographs that helped promote the Cradle Mountain area by being paraded in Launceston, via a new branch of the Royal Historical Society. Promotion of the black and white images and Gustav's ongoing lobbying in Hobart, finally resulted in the area being declared a reserve in 1922, which is now known as the Cradle Mountain-Lake St. Clair National Park.
