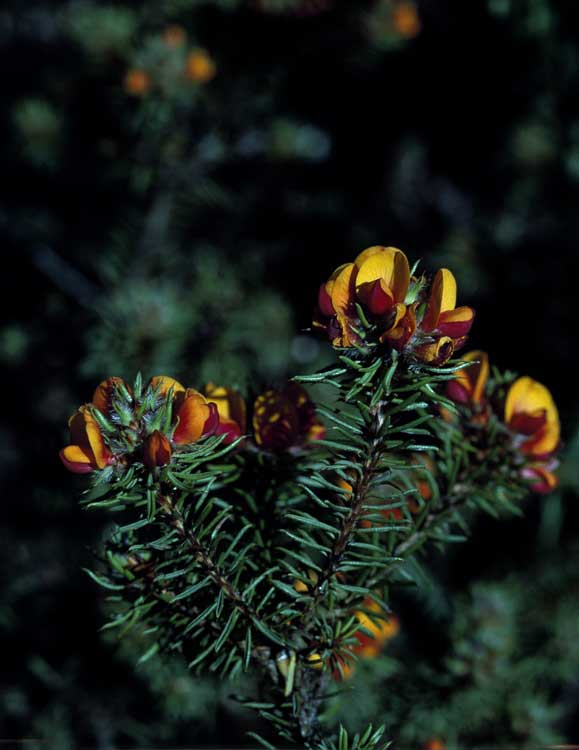
- Pultenaea glabra near Cowra and Grenfell

Conservation status
- Vulnerable (EPBC Act)

Scientific classification
- Kingdom: Plantae
- Clade: Tracheophytes
- Clade: Angiosperms
- Clade: Eudicots
- Clade: Rosids
- Order: Fabales
- Family: Fabaceae
- Subfamily: Faboideae
- Genus: Pultenaea
- Species: P. glabra

Binomial name
- Pultenaea glabra Benth.

= Pultenaea glabra =

Smooth bush-pea

Species of flowering plant

Pultenaea glabra, commonly known as smooth bush-pea, is a species of flowering plant in the family Fabaceae and is endemic to eastern New South Wales. It is an erect shrub with glabrous stems, linear to egg-shaped leaves with a concave upper surface, and yellow to red and orange flowers.

== Description ==
Pultenaea glabra is an erect shrub that typically grows to a height of 1.5–3 m (4 ft 11 in – 9 ft 10 in) and has glabrous stems. The leaves are arranged alternately, linear to egg-shaped leaves with the narrower end towards the base, 10–20 mm (0.39–0.79 in) long and 1–2 mm (0.039–0.079 in) wide with a concave upper surface and stipules 4–5 mm (0.16–0.20 in) long at the base. The flowers are arranged in dense, leafy clusters near the ends of branchlets and are about 10 mm (0.39 in) long on pedicels 0.5–1.0 mm (0.020–0.039 in) long with papery, linear to triangular bracteoles 3–4 mm (0.12–0.16 in) long attached near the base of the sepal tube. The sepals are about 6 mm (0.24 in) long, the standard petal is yellow to red with reddish markings,8.0–11.5 mm (0.31–0.45 in) long, the wings are yellow to red and the keel yellow to orange. Flowering occurs in most months but mainly from September to November and the fruit is a pod about 5 mm (0.20 in) long.

== Taxonomy and naming ==
Pultenaea glabra was first formally described in 1864 by George Bentham in Flora Australiensis from specimens collected in the Blue Mountains by Richard Cunningham. The specific epithet (glabra) means "without hair".

== Distribution and habitat ==
Smooth bush-pea grows in swampy places in forest in the higher parts of the Blue Mountains in eastern New South Wales.

== Conservation status ==
This pultenaea is listed as "vulnerable" under the Australian Government Environment Protection and Biodiversity Conservation Act 1999 and the New South Wales Government Biodiversity Conservation Act. The main threats to the species are its restricted distribution, habitat loss, weed invasion and drying of the species' habitat.
