= Gustav Weindorfer =

Australian botanist (1874–1932)

Weindorfer beside a King Billy pine tree

Gustav Weindorfer (23 February 1874 – 5 May 1932) was an Austrian-born Australian amateur botanist, lodge-keeper and promoter of the Cradle Mountains National Park.

== Early years ==
Weindorfer was born in 1874 in Spittal an der Drau, Carinthia, an alpine province of Austria-Hungary. His father was a senior civil servant before becoming involved in the management of large agricultural estates in African colonies. Gustav was well educated, training at an agricultural college near Vienna with the aim to also enter the field of agricultural management. He had some formal botany training in Austria. Weindorfer tried several and varied positions, eventually deciding to emigrate to Australia.

== Arrival in Australia ==
He arrived in Melbourne on 13 June 1900. Gustav obtained a clerical position with the Austrian Lloyd Steamship Company. In 1901, his social standing was somewhat elevated when he became Honorary Chancellor of the Austro-Hungarian Consulate. During that year and the next, almost every weekend Weindorfer would stroll through the Royal Botanic Gardens, Melbourne, or go walking in the nearby bushland with friends. On 9 September 1901, Gustav went to a meeting of the Victorian Field Naturalists Club and immediately became an enthusiastic member. One outcome of his extensive involvement with the club was the discovery of a new pea plant, now named for him, Pultenaea weindorferi. A species of liverwort, Gackstroemia weindorferi, is also named after him.

Another was his meeting with Kate Cowle. Kate had recently moved from Tasmania, where her family had a farm at Kindred, near Devonport. Their shared enthusiasm for botany led to their marriage. The wedding occurred in Stowport on 1 February 1906. A large part of their honeymoon was spent camped on Mount Roland with the aim of making an extensive botany collection. This would have been the first time Gustav would have had a clear view of Cradle Mountain. Kate and Gustav purchased a farm at Kindred and Gustav proved to be a capable farmer.

== Waldheim Chalet ==
Weindorfer's first trip to Cradle Mountain was in January 1909, with his friend and botanist mentor, Dr Sutton. A local guide led them on the last roadless stretch into the valley. Their provisions included six plant presses. Two days were spent exploring the Cradle Mountain environment. This included an attempt on the summit, but time had been used up in plant collecting and thick fog turned them back from the final climb. Over the next year, Gustav enthused about the Cradle area, describing it as a "veritable Eldorado for the botanist" and likening it to his Carinthian homeland.

He returned the following summer with his wife Kate and Mr (later Major) R E Smith. On 4 January 1910, the party were graced with fine weather for their climb of the mountain. It was here that Smith later quoted Weindorfer as saying:

This must be a National Park for the people for all time. It is magnificent, and people must know about it and enjoy it.

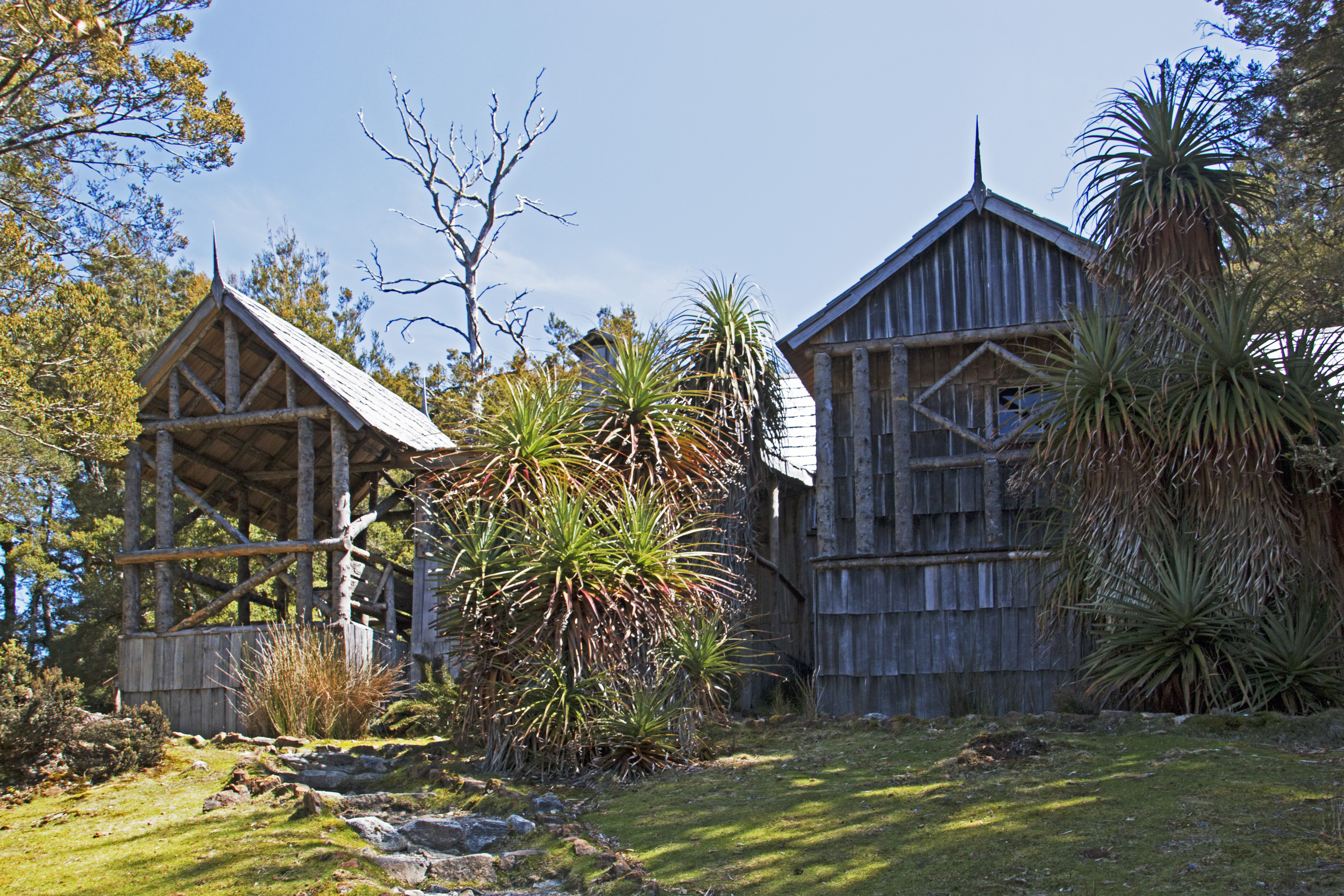
Weindorfer's chalet Waldheim (rebuilt)

While in the valley Kate and Gustav selected a site for them to build a chalet that would allow tourists to stay in the valley. Some hundreds of acres were purchased, and in March 1912, Gustav commenced work on the building he was to call Waldheim, or "home in the forest". It was built of King Billy pine, harvested from the adjacent forest. By Christmas 1912, stage one was ready for the first visitors, with a living and dining room and two bedrooms.

Despite early tourists having to walk up to 8 miles (13 km) to reach Waldheim, it was a success. Eventually, a rough track allowed a horse and cart to reach the valley entrance: the government was slow in responding to Weindorfer's repeated requests for a proper road. Weindorfer continued to work on his tourism dream, enlarging the chalet, naming features in the valley and clearing and marking tracks to the best spots.

== Death of Kate ==
1916 was a year of disaster for Weindorfer. His mother died in January; Kate who had been ill for some time died in April. One of his brothers died in June and then his father in October. In 1917, he sold the farm at Kindred and became a full-time resident at Waldheim. His unhappiness and isolation were enhanced due to World War I and his Austrian heritage. Gustav had become an Australian citizen before his marriage, but despite this, some local groups ostracised him and people spread the foolish rumour that he was a spy.

In 2024 Kate Weindorfers remains were exhumed from her burial site at The Don, near Devonport and interred with her husband Gustav at Cradle Valley near their forest home Waldheim in early 2026 there was a gathering of the relatives of Kate and their friends to celebrate the reinternment.

== Promotion of the area ==
In 1921, Weindorfer set out on a tour of Tasmania to promote both Waldheim and the concept of a national park for Cradle Mountain. The following year, a scenic reserve and wildlife sanctuary was declared, stretching from Cradle Mountain to Lake St Clair. His reputation as a great host spread, but visitors came mainly in summer. Dorfer, as he became known, enjoyed company so in the many quiet times, he felt great loneliness. As the years went by, the national economic situation deteriorated, resulting in a drop in visitor numbers. Gustav had to sell timber and furs of local animals to make ends meet.

Dorfer mostly cared for visitors single-handedly. This, along with the extra jobs and the cold winters, strained his health. His heart had shown a weakness in the early 1920s, and towards the end of the decade he commented in his diary "Strange experience. My heart acted strangely. Had to lie down in bed. I do not smoke any more. I have to give up tea..."

== Death and remembrance ==
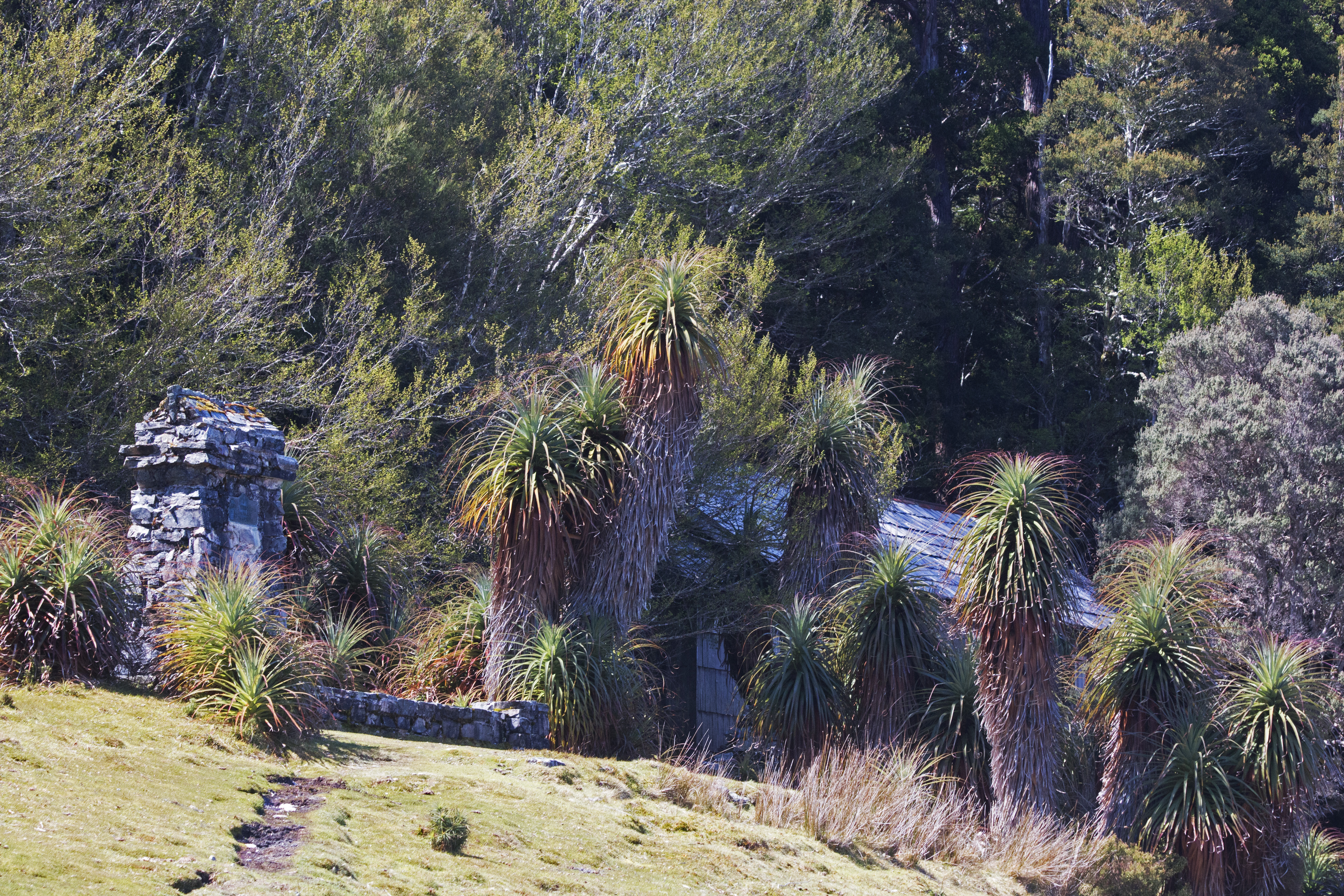
Weindorfer's tomb

In April 1931 he bought a motor cycle to make travel out of the valley easier. On 5 May 1932, while trying to start the cycle, his heart gave out. He was found dead the next day, near the present Ronny Creek car park. Weindorfer had died within sight of his beloved mountain. Following his wishes, he was buried in the valley, the ceremony being conducted on 10 May 1932.

In November 1932, Gustav's sister sent a bunch of everlasting flowers and four candles, asking that they be placed on his grave on New Year's Day, as was the custom in Carinthia. This simple ceremony was continued until the outbreak of World War II and subsequently revived in 1954. The current format of a memorial service on New Year's Day, along with the placing of flowers and lighting of candles, was instituted by the North West Walking Club in the early 1970s and organised by the Weindorfer Memorial Service Committee. It became necessary to use local flowers, but candles are still sent from Austria.

The Weindorfer Association was created in late 2023 and since then has held a memorial and celebration of Gustav and Kates lives on Weindorfer Day which is held annually on the first Sunday of May (around the date of his death on May 5th)

Past services were organised by the Weindorfer Memorial Service Committee was held on New Year's Day 2017, after 2017 the responsibility was transferred to the Kentish Municipality who vested the responsibility to the Wilmot Tourist and Progress association who ran Weindorfer Day for several years.

Weindorfer Service, 1 Jan 2011

In 2013, Crescendo Choir, a Tasmanian Education Department choir, commissioned Paul Jarman to compose the choral work, The Mountain, about the lives of Gustav and Kate Weindorfer. The work was premiered at the Cradle Mountain Interpretation Centre on 26 June 2016.

The memorial to Gustav Weindorfer (and later Kate) is believed to be the longest running public memorial to the contribution of an individual in Australia and is now in its 93rd year

== See also ==
- Alice Manfield, a similarly influential figure at Victoria's Mt Buffalo
