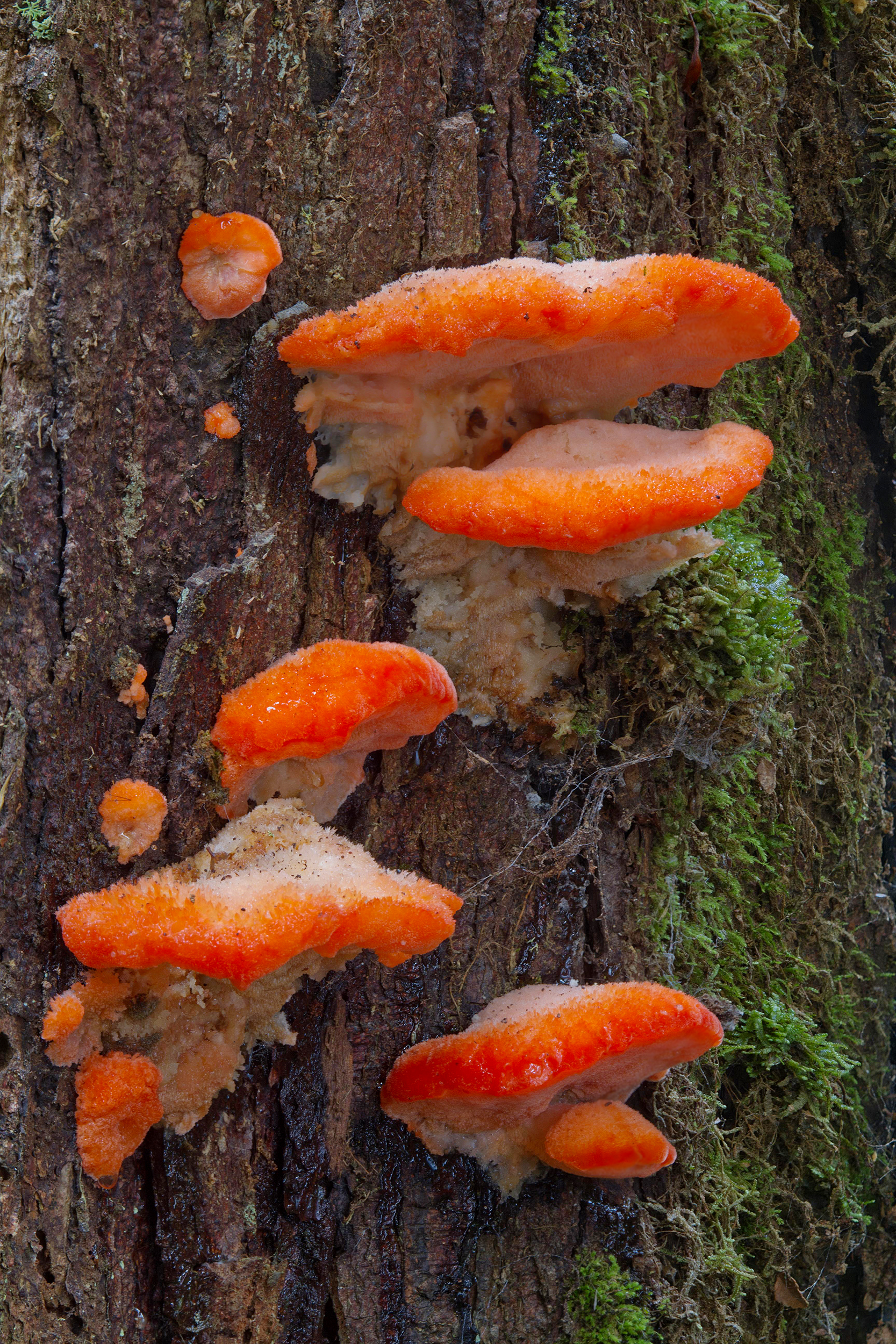

Scientific classification
- Kingdom: Fungi
- Division: Basidiomycota
- Class: Agaricomycetes
- Order: Polyporales
- Family: Incrustoporiaceae
- Genus: Tyromyces
- Species: T. pulcherrimus

Binomial name
- Tyromyces pulcherrimus (Rodway) G.Cunn. (1965)

Synonyms
- Polyporus pulcherrimus Rodway (1922); Aurantiporus pulcherrimus (Rodway) P.K.Buchanan & Hood (1992)

= Tyromyces pulcherrimus =

Species of fungus

Tyromyces pulcherrimus, commonly known as the strawberry bracket, is a species of poroid fungus in the family Polyporaceae. It is readily recognisable by its reddish fruit bodies with pores on the cap underside. The fungus is found natively in Australia and New Zealand, where it causes a white rot in living and dead logs of southern beech and eucalyptus. In southern Brazil, it is an introduced species that is associated with imported eucalypts.

== Taxonomy ==
The fungus was first described in 1922 by English-born Australian dentist and botanist Leonard Rodway, who called it Polyporus pulcherrimus. Curtis Gates Lloyd, an American mycologist to whom Rodway had sent a specimen for examination, suggested a similarity to Albatrellus confluens. Gordon Herriot Cunningham transferred it to the genus Tyromyces in 1922 to give it the name by which it is known by today. Some sources refer to the species as Aurantiporus pulcherrimus, after Buchanan and Hood's proposed 1992 transfer to Aurantiporus.

The specific epithet pulcherrimus is derived from the Latin word for "very beautiful". One common name used for the fungus is strawberry bracket.

== Description ==
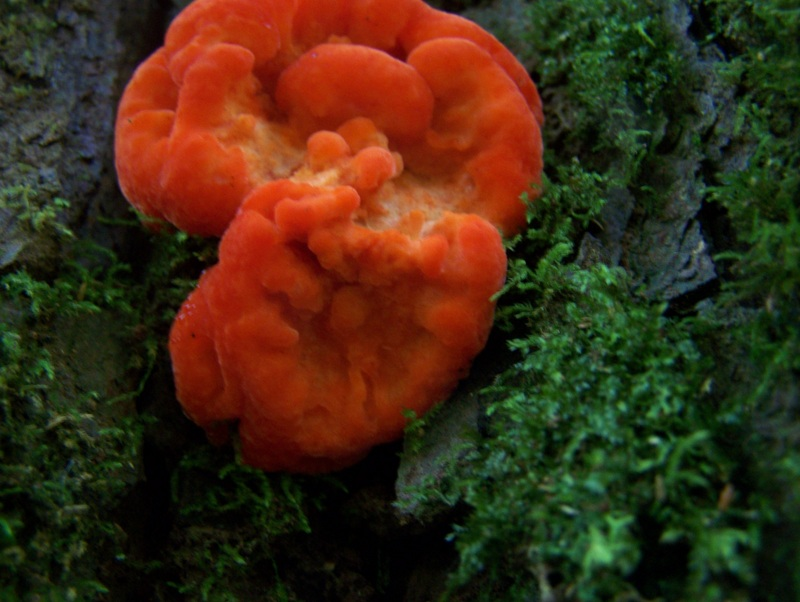
Fruit body photographed on Nothofagus cunninghamii in the Upper Florentine Valley, Tasmania

The fruit bodies of Tyromyces pulcherrimus are bracket-shaped caps that measure 3–8 cm (1.2–3.1 in) in diameter. They are sessile, lacking a stipe, and are instead attached directly to the substrate. The cap colour when fresh is cherry red or salmon, but it dries to become brownish. The cap surface can be hairy, particularly near the point of attachment. Pores on the cap underside are red, and number about 1–3 per millimetre. The flesh is soft and thick, red, and watery. It does not have any distinct odour. Tyromyces pulcherrimus is inedible.

With a monomitic hyphal system, Tyromyces pulcherrimus contains only generative hyphae. These hyphae are clamped, and are sometime covered with granules, or an orange substance that appears oily. The hyphae in the context are arranged in a parallel fashion, and strongly agglutinated to form a densely packed tissue. Cystidia are absent from the hymenium. The basidia are club shaped with typically four sterigmata, and measure 15–23 by 6.5–7.5 μm. Spores are ellipsoid to more or less spherical, hyaline, and measure 5–7 by 3.5–4.5 μm.

== Habitat and distribution ==
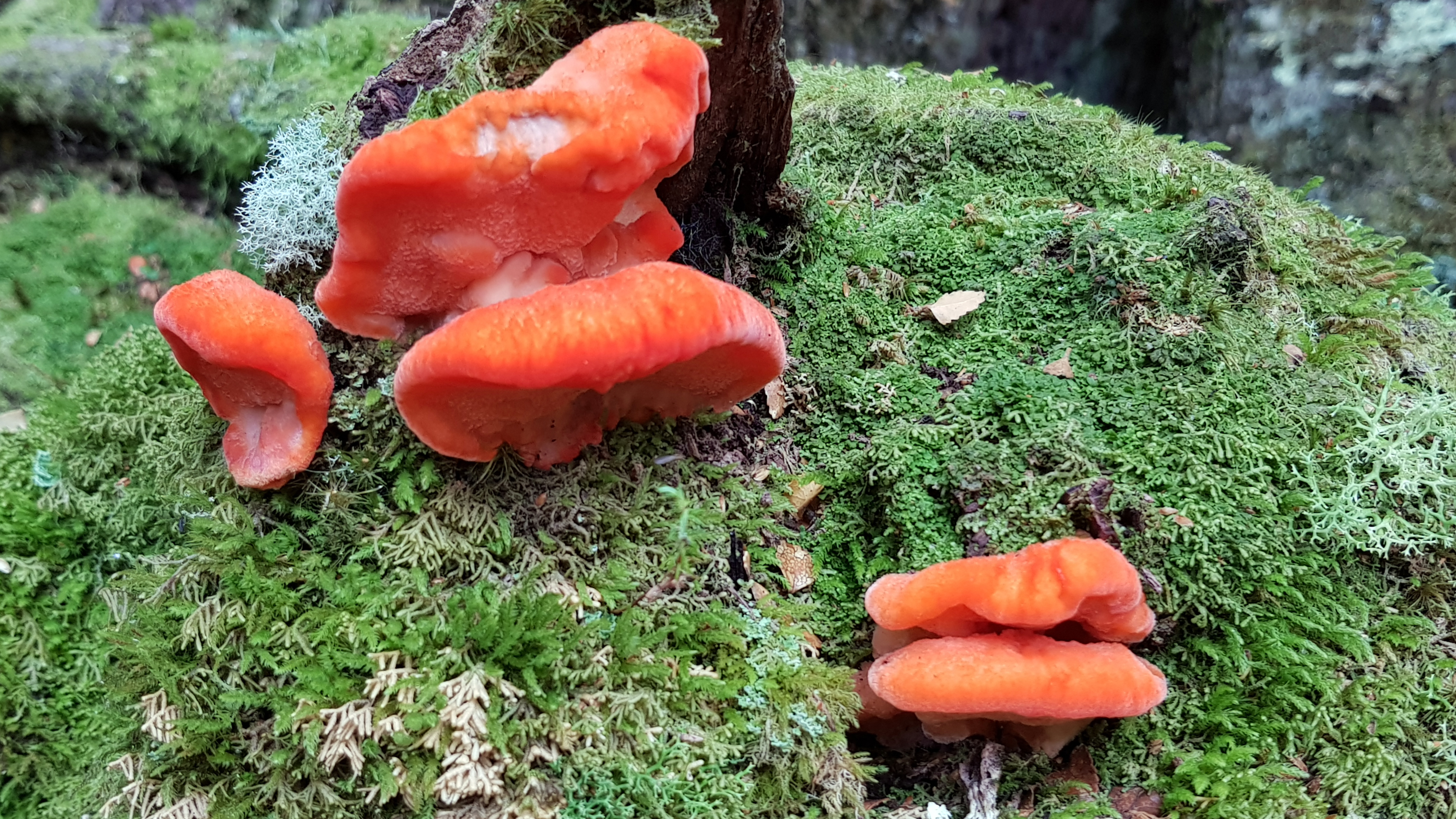
Tyromyces pulcherrimus in the Cradle Mountain-Lake St Clair National Park, Tasmania

Tyromyces pulcherrimus is a white rot fungus that grows on the exposed heartwood of several tree species. It has been recorded on southern beech (Nothofagus cunninghamii) in Victoria and Tasmania and on Antarctic beech (Nothofagus moorei) in Queensland and New South Wales. In Tasmania, evidence suggests that it prefers wet forests, including rainforest and wet sclerophyll forest. In Brazil, it is an introduced species that has been recorded on imported eucalypts. It has been found there in Rio Grande do Sul State. In New Zealand, the fungus has been recorded on red beech (Fuscospora fusca) and silver beech (Lophozonia menziesii).
