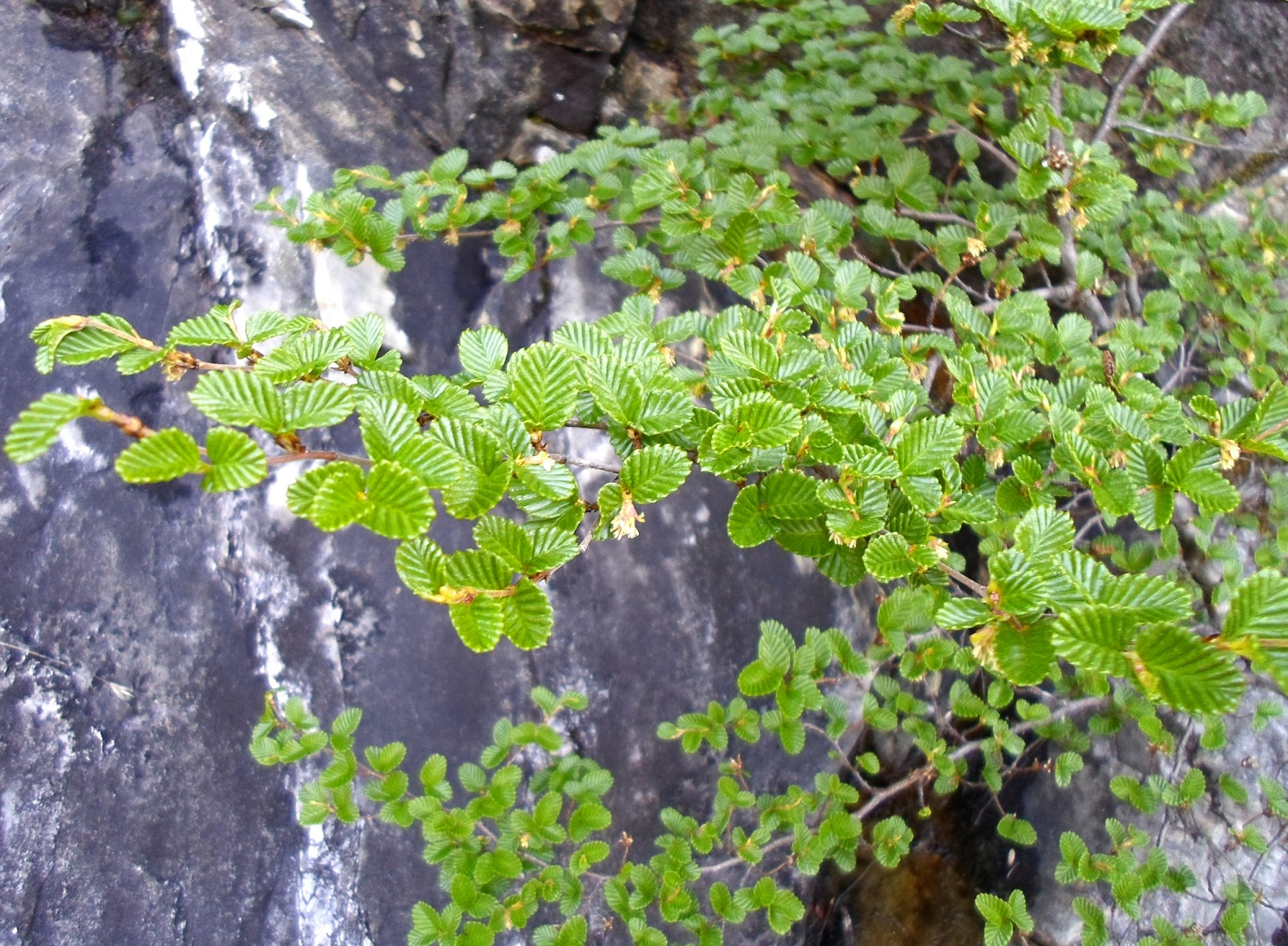

Conservation status
- Near Threatened (IUCN 3.1)

Scientific classification
- Kingdom: Plantae
- Clade: Tracheophytes
- Clade: Angiosperms
- Clade: Eudicots
- Clade: Rosids
- Order: Fagales
- Family: Nothofagaceae
- Genus: Nothofagus
- Subgenus: Nothofagus subg. Fuscospora
- Species: N. gunnii

Binomial name
- Nothofagus gunnii (Hook.f.) Oerst.

Synonyms
- Fuscospora gunnii (Hook.f.) Heenan & Smissen; Fagus gunnii Hook.f.

= Nothofagus gunnii =

Species of plant

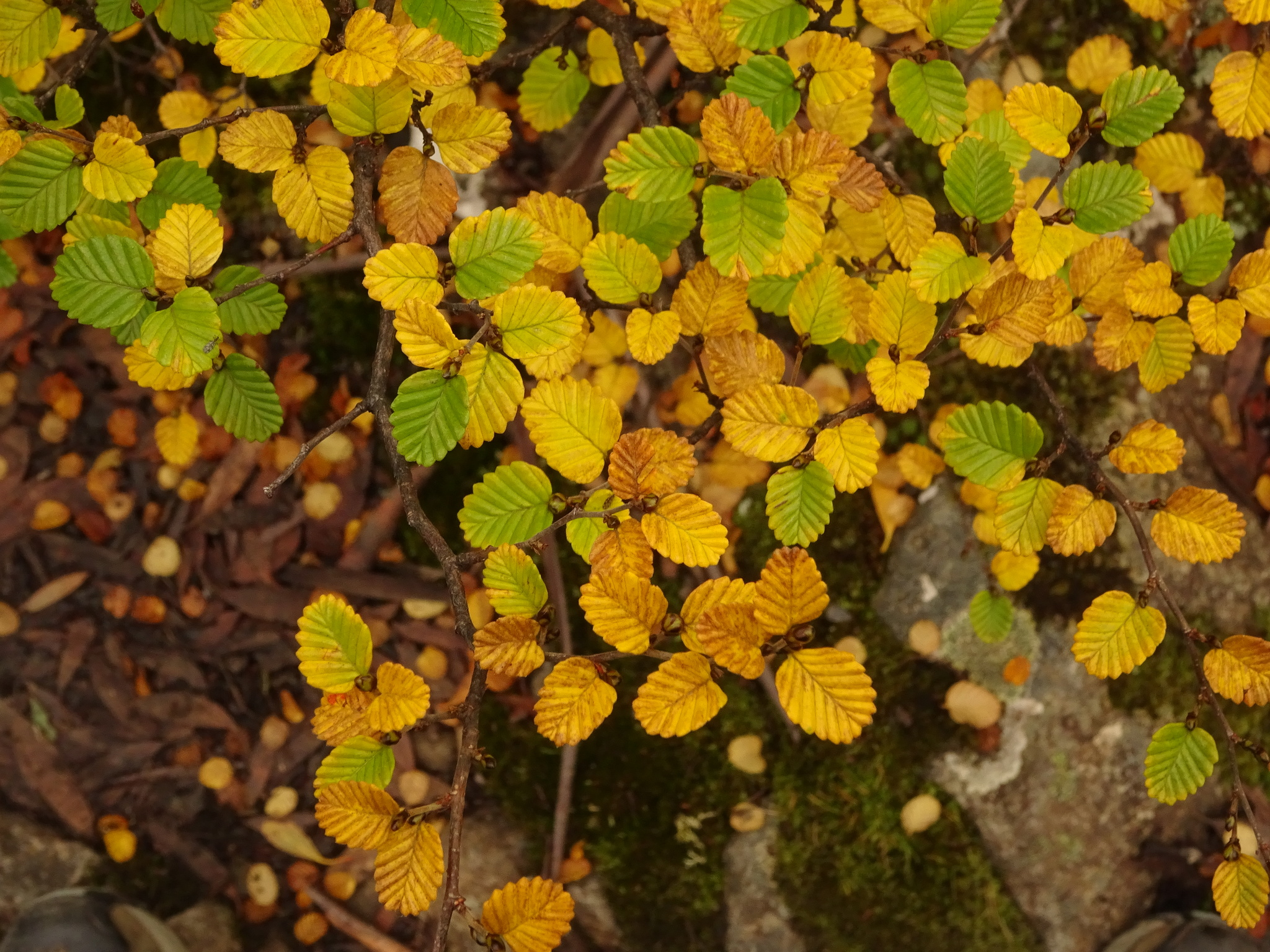
Nothofagus gunnii in Mount Field National Park, showing deciduous autumnal colours.

Nothofagus gunnii, the tanglefoot or deciduous beech, is a deciduous shrub or small tree endemic to the highlands of Tasmania, Australia. It was described in 1847 by R.C Gunn N. gunnii is a small woody tree with a shrubby appearance known to grow up to 8 metres (26 ft). It lives only on mountains due to temperature limitations within the Tasmanian maritime climate and mainly grows at elevations above 800 metres (2,600 ft) above sea level. It grows in alpine and sub-alpine regions in the central portions of the island. Though capable of reaching the size of a small tree, it is most common as a thick shrub or woody ground cover, hence its common name of "tanglefoot".

== Taxonomy ==
Joseph Dalton Hooker described the tanglefoot beech. Common names include tanglefoot or deciduous beech, or fagus,. The species is only distantly related to genus Fagus, the beeches of the Northern Hemisphere, which are members of a different family, Fagaceae.

The species was renamed as Fuscospora gunnii by New Zealand scientists. The change in name is controversial, and it is not necessary to accept this change.

== Description ==
Nothofagus gunnii is a tangled shrub or small tree which may grow up to 8 metres tall (growth habit is heavily dependent on the exposure of the site) and has a thick shrubby appearance. The leaves are alternate, simple and ovate, with rounded teeth on the margins. The leaves are attached by short petioles. Leaf lamina is generally <20mm in length and shows a distinct "concertina" shape derived from the way that the developing leaf is folded in the bud. The leaves are almost circular in shape with deep veins which end in the gaps between the rounded teeth on the leaf. The leaves are deciduous, with an average lifespan of around 7–8 months. They are bright green, turning yellow -then sometimes brilliant red, in autumn. The plant has separate male and female flowers that can occur on the same tree. Both male and female flowers are small and inconspicuous. The fruit is small (about 6 mm wide) and woody, and contains three small nuts, two of which have three small wings and one with two wings. In most years seed production is poor, but once in a while a 'mast' crop occurs with high germination. The seeds have a very short viability.

Nothofagus gunnii is easily visually separated from the other Tasmanian species from the same genus, Nothofagus cunninghamii, by the crinkled appearance of the leaf lamina.

Tanglefoot forests cannot survive fire, and must re-establish from neighbouring areas. They are very sensitive to changed conditions due to their slow growth. Under 100 km^{2} (39 sq mi) of forest remain. This species is the only native deciduous tree species in Tasmania, and the only cold-climate winter-deciduous tree species in Australia.

== Distribution ==
Nothofagus gunnii is endemic to the island of Tasmania, and is restricted to high altitude and relatively high rainfall areas with no recent fire activity. It was discovered at the summit of Mount Olympus in central Tasmania, and is also known at several locations within the Mount Field National Park and on Cradle Mountain. It is considered a paleoendemic species to Tasmania. Macrofossils of this species have been discovered within Oligocene sediments in Tasmania.

== Cultivation ==
Nothofagus gunnii requires around 1,800 mm of rain spread throughout the year to be cultivated, cool temperatures not below -10 °C and also requires full sun. It grows in deep peaty soils. It is best grown from fresh seed collected in a 'mast' year, germinating in a few weeks. It is believed that a beneficial mycorrhizal fungus is required for the long-term success of the plant. Cuttings can be struck, taken in late winter before bud burst.

Nothofagus gunnii is rarely seen in cultivation due to its poor performance and slow growth. It is believed to be a candidate plant for bonsai.

== Ecology and reproduction ==
Nothofagus gunnii exists only in alpine and sub-alpine environments on mountains within Tasmania. The species is generally limited to heights above 800 metres (2,600 ft) due to the temperature and relatively short snow life duration within the Tasmanian oceanic climate. It may live as a dominant low shrubby tree on open, generally sloping, rocky ground. N. gunnii habitation is severely limited by fire regimes as it is fire sensitive and can only survive very low intensity fires. Local extinctions of the species have been attributed to fire in the Denison Range. Despite the limited range of Nothofagus gunnii, the species is not listed as endangered.

Although very few data are recorded about reproduction of N. gunnii, it may be assumed that seeds are wind dispersed and that the species are mast seeders as is displayed in similar species such as Nothofagus cunninghamii. The species is wind-pollinated.
