= Mount Pelion West =

Mountain in Tasmania, Australia

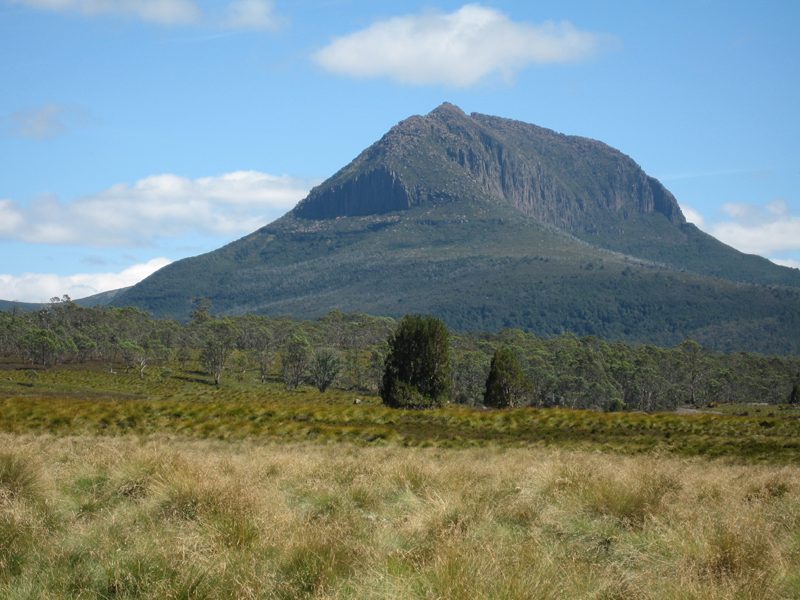
- Pelion West from near Pelion Hut on Pelion Plains

Highest point
- Elevation: 1,560 m (5,120 ft)
- Prominence: 469 m (1,539 ft)
- Isolation: 6.35 km (3.95 mi)
- Coordinates: 41°49′48″S 145°58′12″E

Geography
- Location within Tasmania
- Location: Central Highlands, Tasmania, Australia
- Parent range: Pelion Range
- Topo map: Achilles (4036)

Geology
- Rock age: Jurassic
- Mountain type: Dolerite

Climbing
- Easiest route: One day return from Pelion Hut, via the Overland Track

Mount Pelion West is a mountain located in the Central Highlands region of Tasmania, Australia. The mountain is part of the Pelion Range and is situated within the Cradle Mountain-Lake St Clair National Park at the easternmost boundary of the Murchison River catchment.

Mount Pelion West is the fourth highest mountain in Tasmania with an elevation of 1,560 metres (5,120 ft) above sea level and is one of only eight mountains in the state which are over 1,500 metres (4,900 ft).

== Mountain location ==
The mountain summit is at grid reference 152682 UTM Zone 55S and high resolution topographical information is available on Tasmap Achilles (4036) 1:25000. To the west lies an extensive, relatively flat moorland, to the north is Cradle Mountain and Barn Bluff, to the northeast and quite close at 6 kilometres (3.7 mi) is Mount Oakleigh, to the east is Mount Pelion East and due south is Mount Achilles. Below the northern side of the mountain is Pelion Creek which flows into the head waters of the Forth River. The Forth River has its origin directly east of Pelion West at Frog Flats (720 metres (2,360 ft) above sea level), the lowest point on the whole Overland Track. At its closest point the Overland Track passes within 2 kilometres (1.2 mi) of the mountain summit.

== Ascending ==
Keith Ernest Lancaster, an early bushwalking and mountain climbing pioneer, climbed Mount Pelion West on 30 January 1946 by enduring a slow and painful crawl through sections of the sharp and prickly Richea scoparia that frequently inhabits alpine areas around Tasmanian mountains. Lancaster referred to Mount Pelion West as one of "The Giants of the Reserve". In his account of his climb Lancaster mentions "the confusion of the enormous boulders" on the top of the mountain.

On the Achilles Tasmap is marked the approximate location of a walking track to climb the mountain along its northeastern spur. The unmarked track start is approximately 250 metres (820 ft) east of the Pelion Creek crossing on the Overland Track and is in between two logs that are perpendicular to the Overland Track. This mountain is much more difficult to climb than either Mount Ossa or Mount Pelion East, the more traditional side-excursion climbs along the famous 65-kilometre (40 mi) Overland Track. This is due to a difficult traverse of over 500 metres (1,600 ft) across huge dolerite boulders to reach the obelisk shaped, sloping summit boulder.

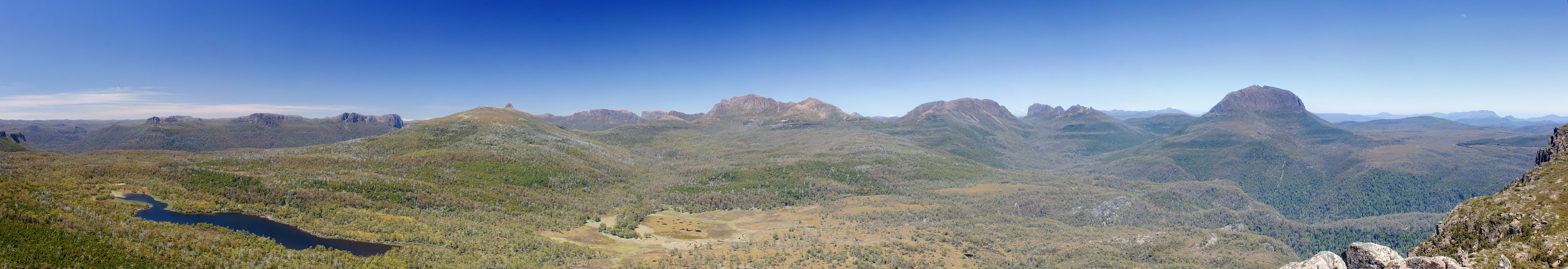
Mount Pelion West (right) in context with other mountains in the Pelion Range

== Gallery ==
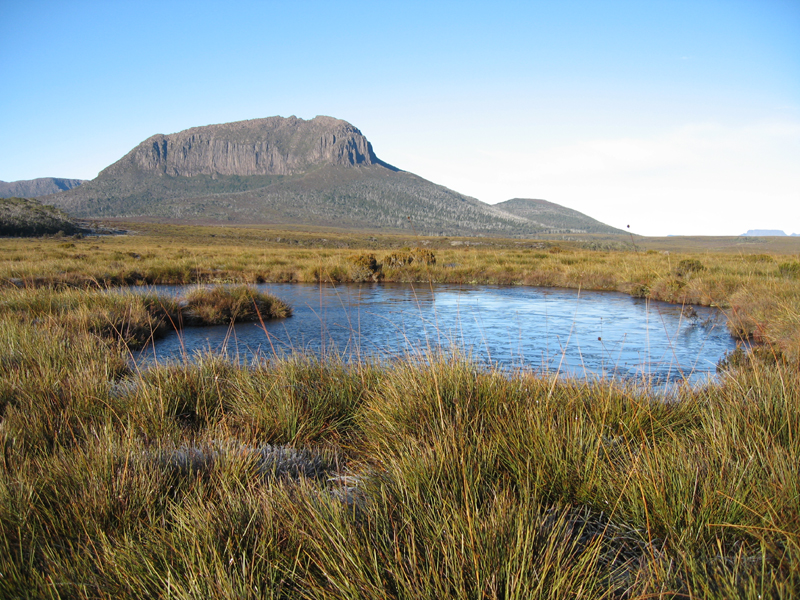
Pelion West as seen from Pine Forest Moor

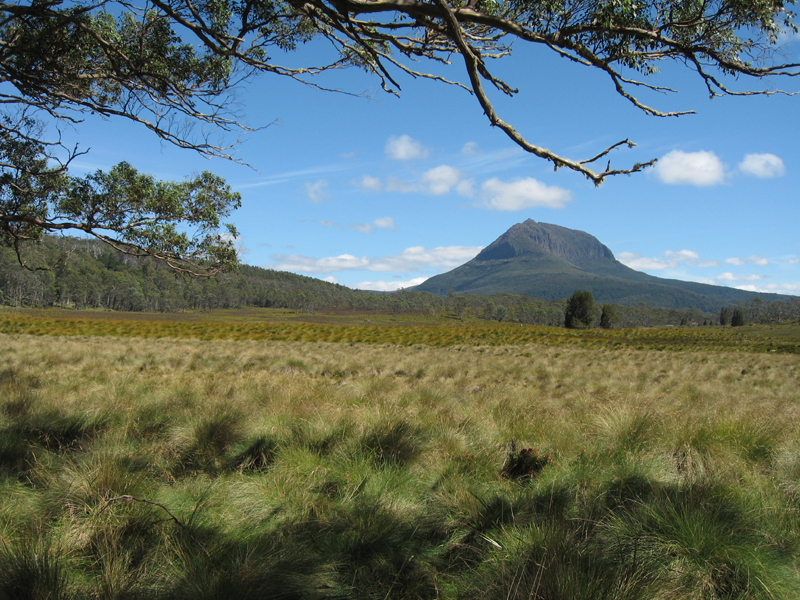
Pelion West from Pelion Plains

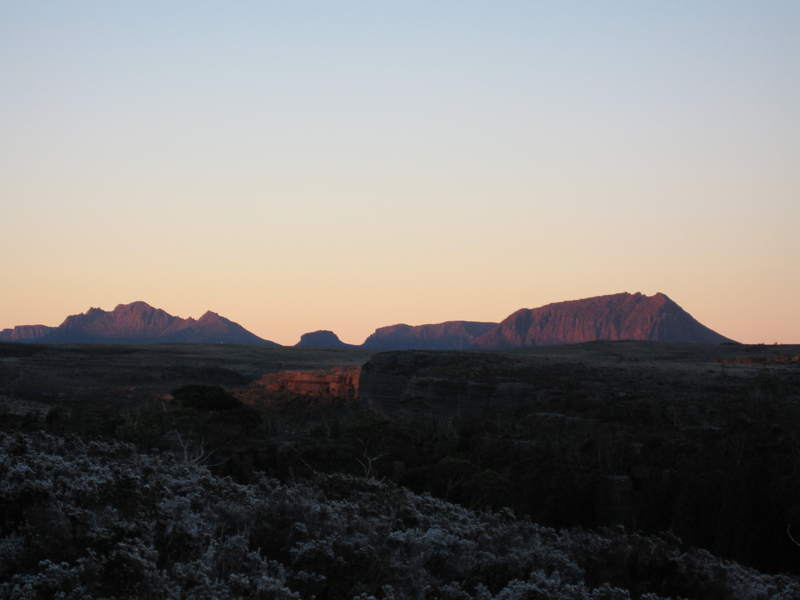
From Waterfall Valley, right to left: Pelion West, Thetis, Paddys Nut, Ossa

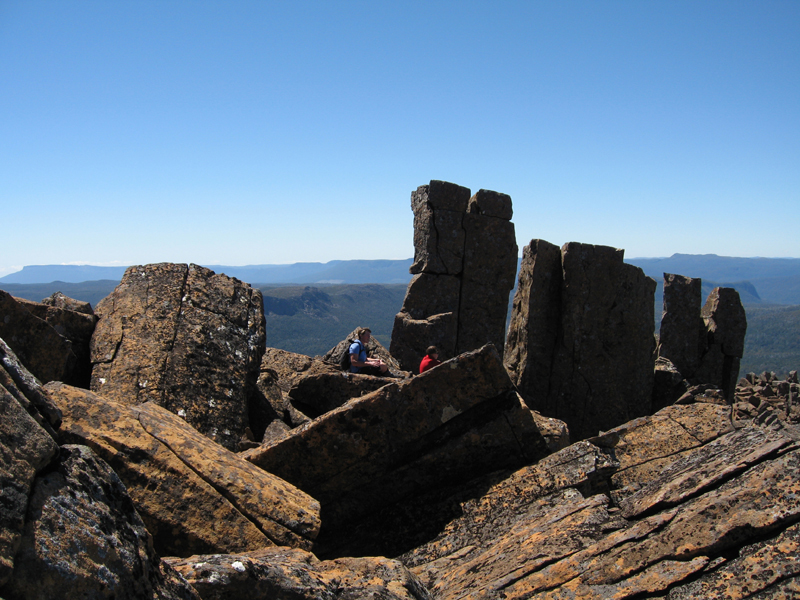
Rugged top of Pelion West

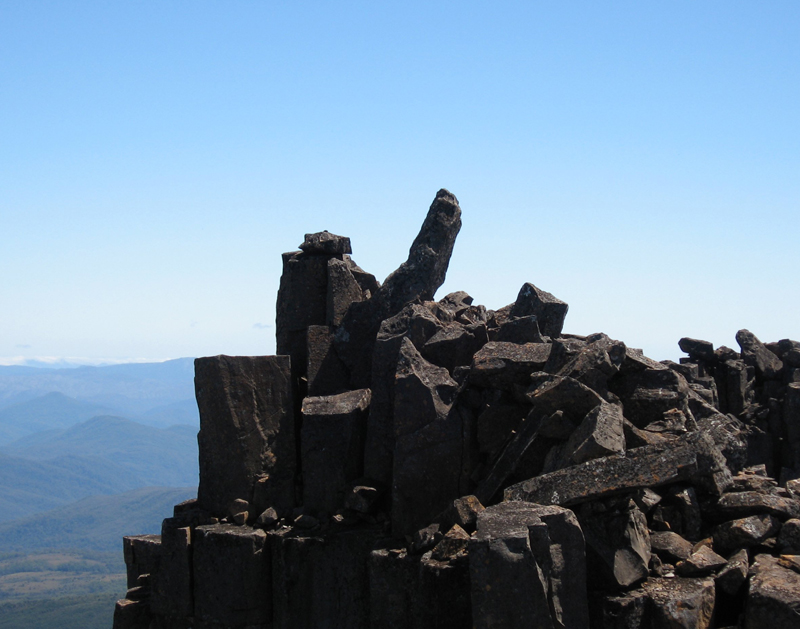
Pelion West's angled obelisk summit boulder

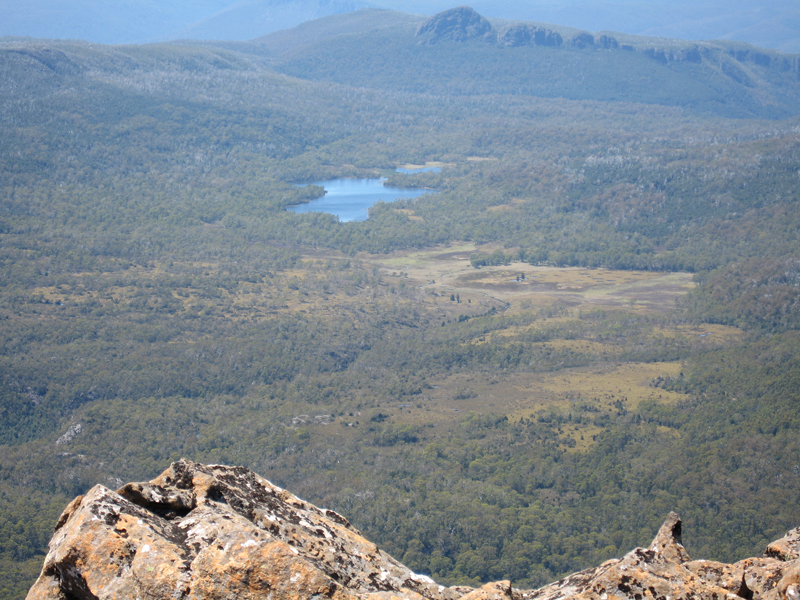
Pelion Plains, Lake Ayr and Mount Pillinger from Pelion West

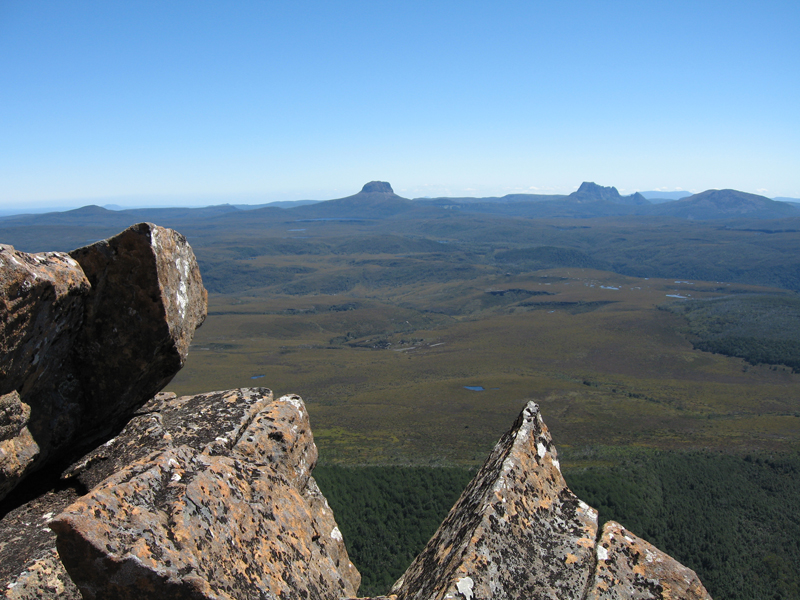
Cradle Mountain and Barn Bluff from Pelion West

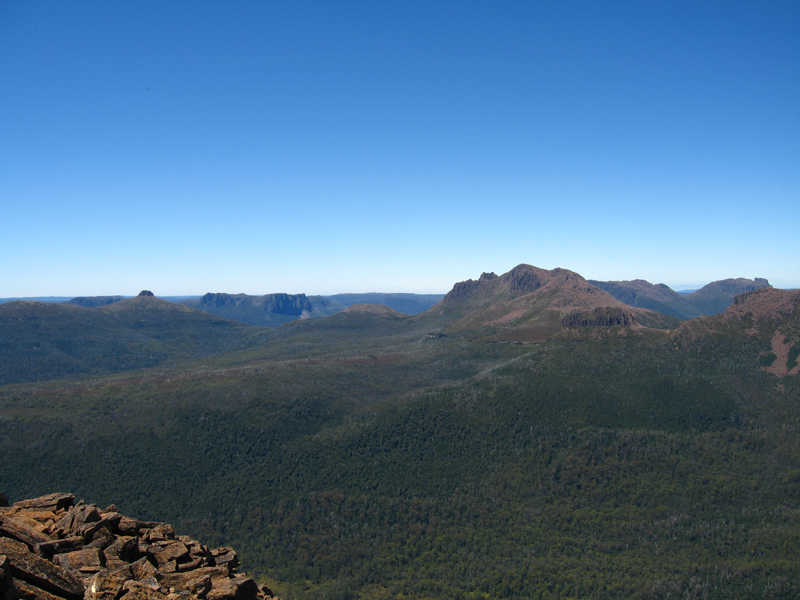
Mount Ossa, Tasmania's highest mountain from Pelion West on the right and Pelion East, the spire-like mountain on the left

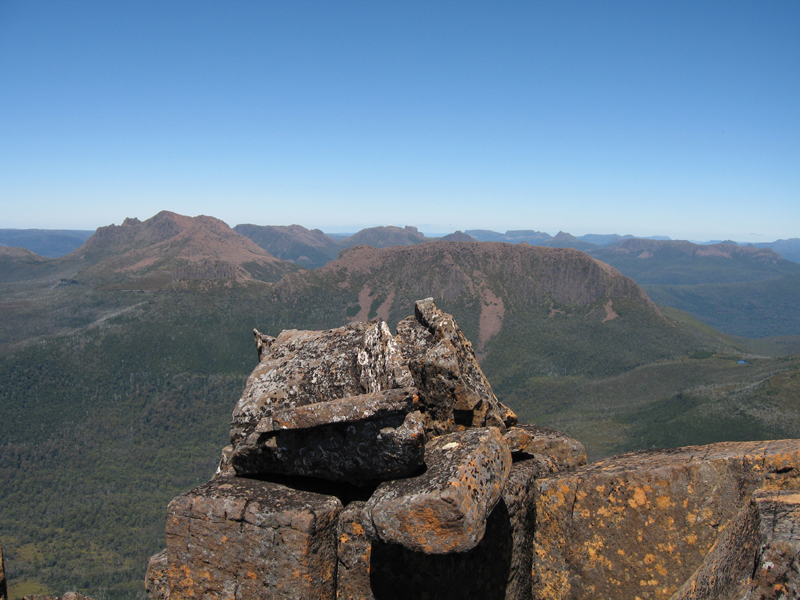
Mount Ossa, Paddys Nut, Mount Thetis and many other spectacular mountains as viewed from Mount Pelion West

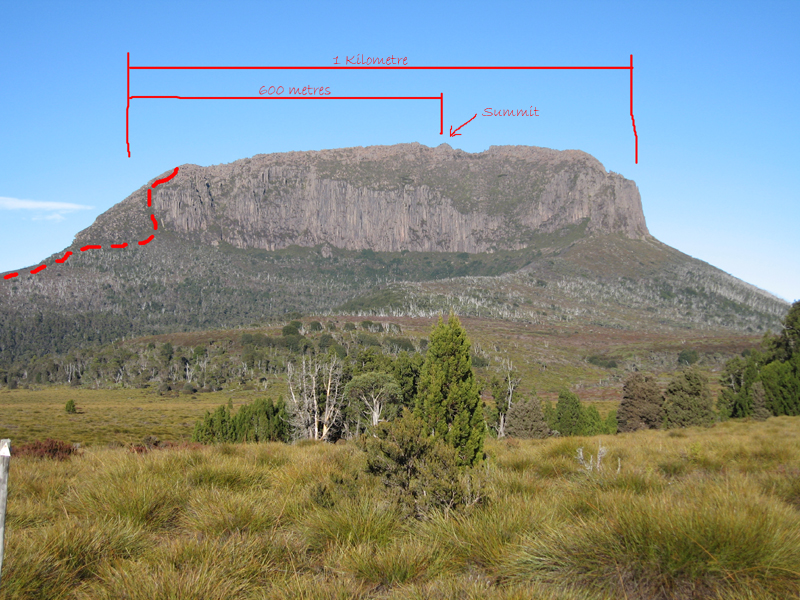
Track location and distance to summit

== See also ==
- Cradle Mountain-Lake St Clair National Park
- List of highest mountains of Tasmania
