= Mount Ragoona =

Mountain in Tasmania, Australia

- Mount Rogoona
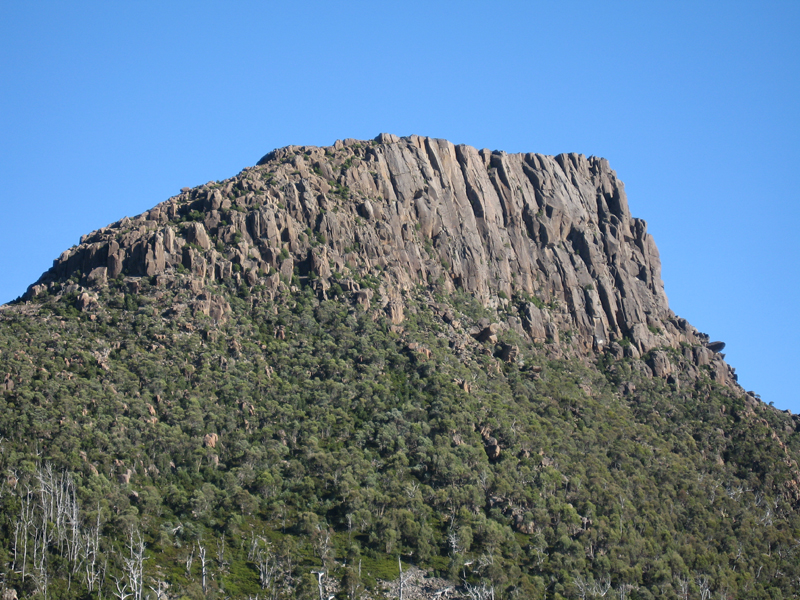
- A close up view of Mount Ragoona

Highest point
- Elevation: 1,336 m (4,383 ft)AHD
- Listing: Highest mountains of Tasmania
- Coordinates: 41°52′19″S 146°12′22″E

Geography
- Location within Tasmania
- Location: Tasmania, Australia
- Topo map: Cathedral TasMap

Mount Ragoona, sometimes Mount Rogoonga, is a relatively high mountain in the southern region of the Walls of Jerusalem National Park in Tasmania, Australia. The mountain, with an elevation of 1,336 metres (4,383 ft) above sea level, is virtually surrounded by four large lakes; Myrtle, Meston, Louisa and Adelaide. The mountain rises from the shores of Lake Myrtle.

== Location and features ==
The mountain summit is at grid reference 334619 UTM Zone 55S and high resolution topographical information is available on Tasmap Cathedral (4236) 1:25000. Directly below its sheer cliff face to the immediate west is Lake Myrtle and further west lies Chalice Lake and then Cathedral Mountain, due north is Lake Bill, somewhat distant to the northeast but dominant are the Walls of Jerusalem and due south are The Mountains of Jupiter.

Nearby visible mountains include Cathedral Mountain, Mount Pelion East, Walls of Jerusalem, The Acropolis, and Mount Geryon.

On the track from Lake Myrtle to Lake Meston shown on the Cathedral Tasmap and at the approximate gridpoint 355624 UTM 55S, a poorly cairned pad follows an eastern ridge towards the summit of Mount Ragoona.

== Gallery ==
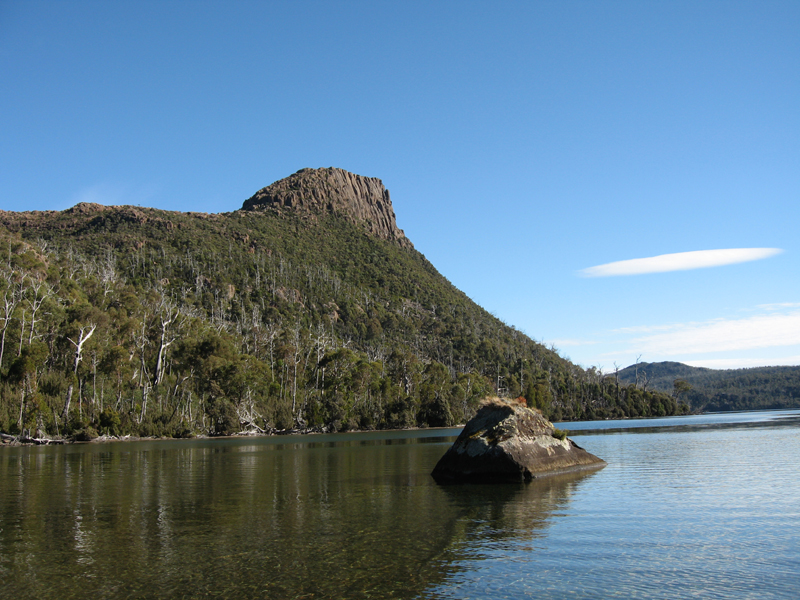
Mount Ragoona and Lake Myrtle

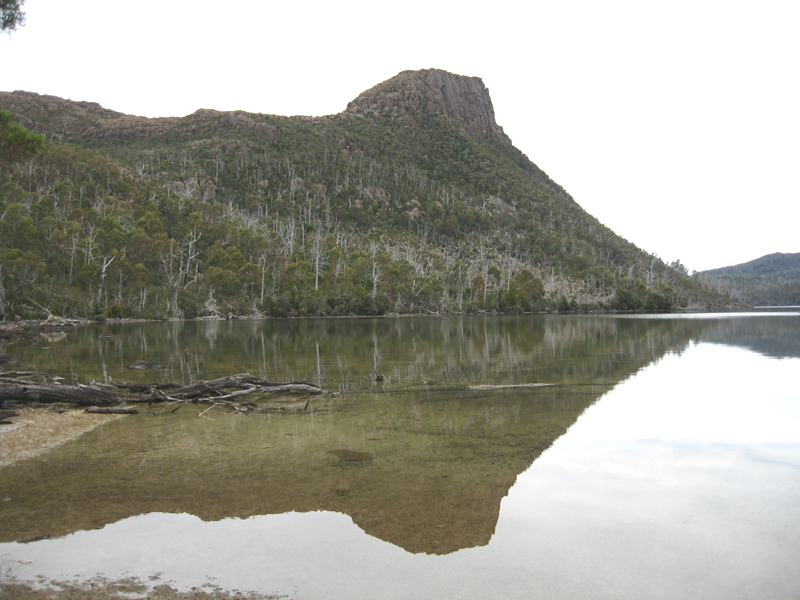
Mount Ragoona reflections

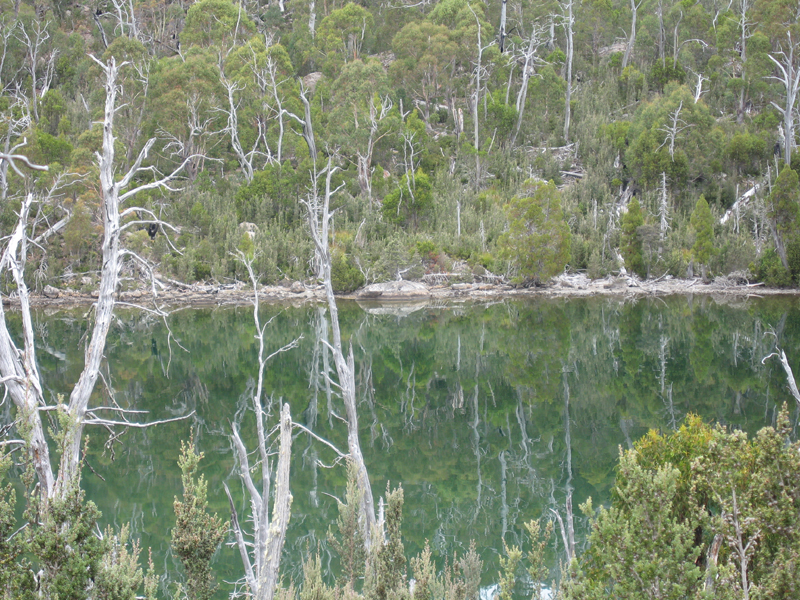
Lake Myrtle reflections

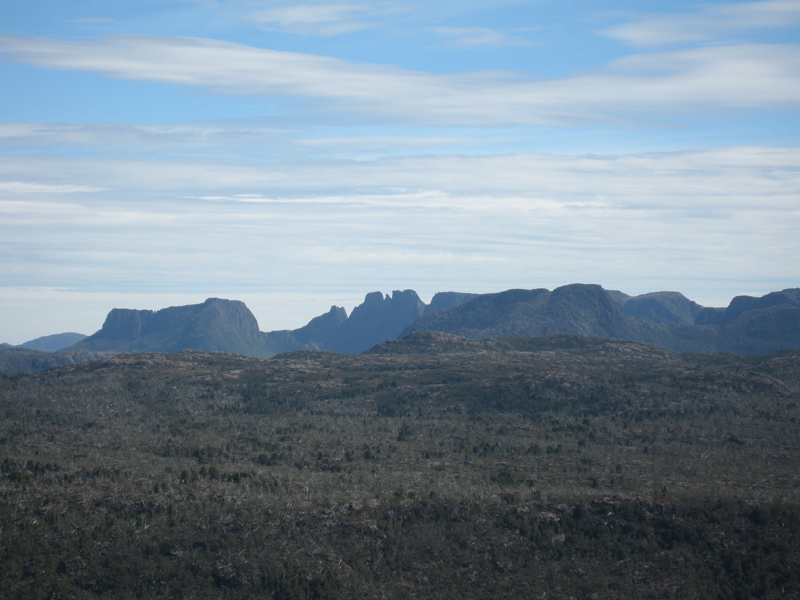
The Acropolis and Mount Geryon

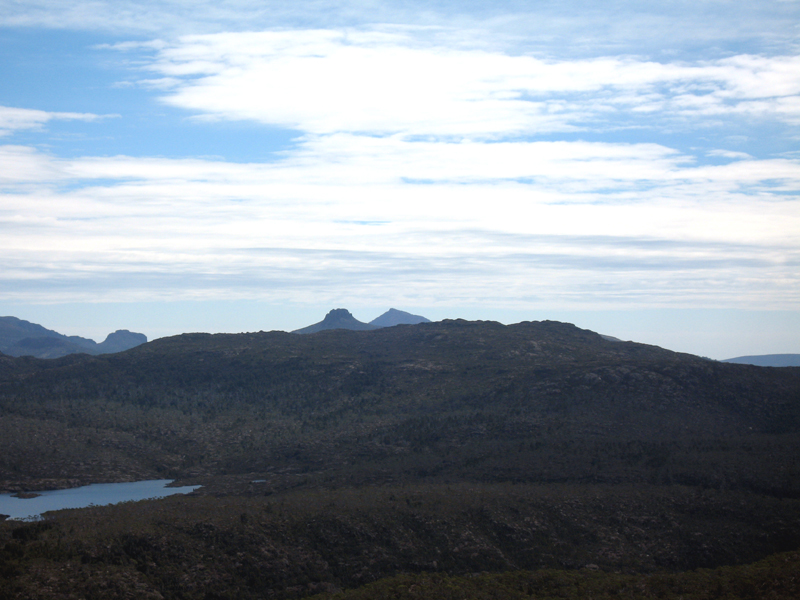
Pelion West, East and Paddys Nut

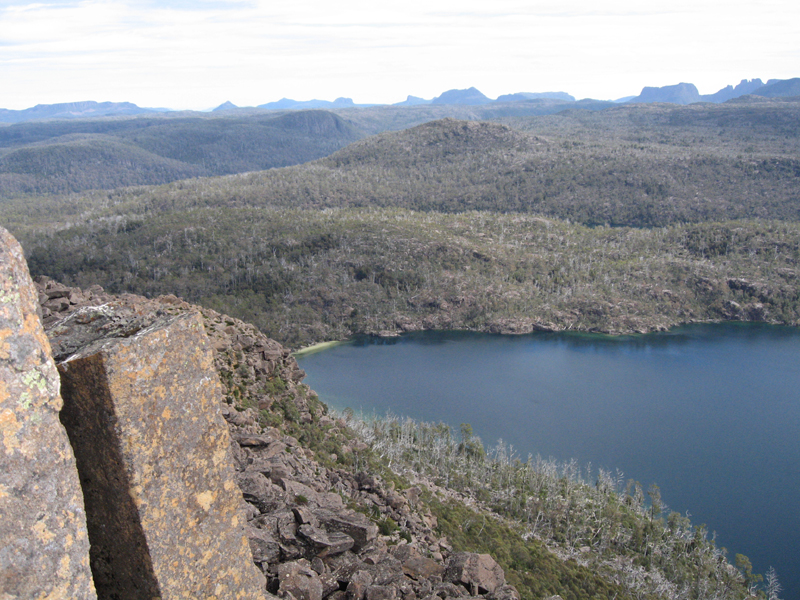
Spectacular mountain views to the south-west

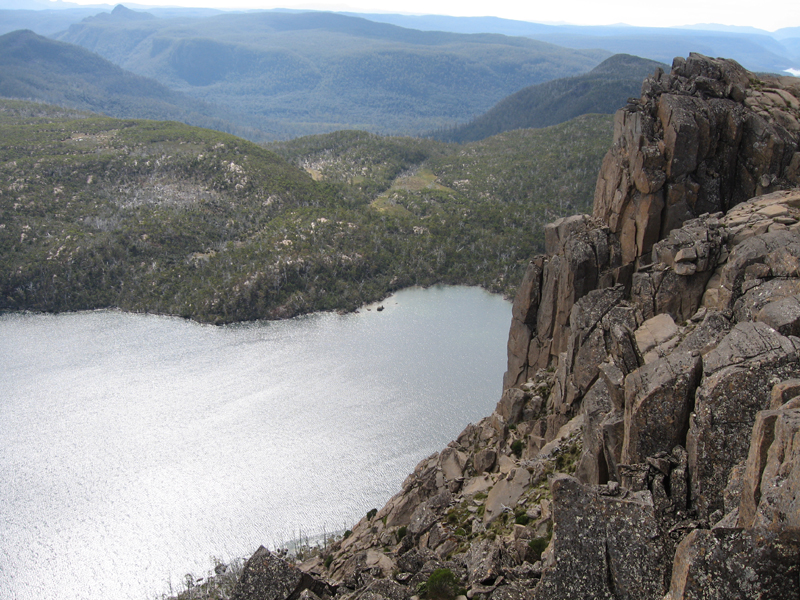
Looking down on Lake Myrtle from near the summit

== See also ==
- Cradle Mountain-Lake St Clair National Park
- List of highest mountains of Tasmania
