= Mount Pelion East =

Mountain in Tasmania, Australia

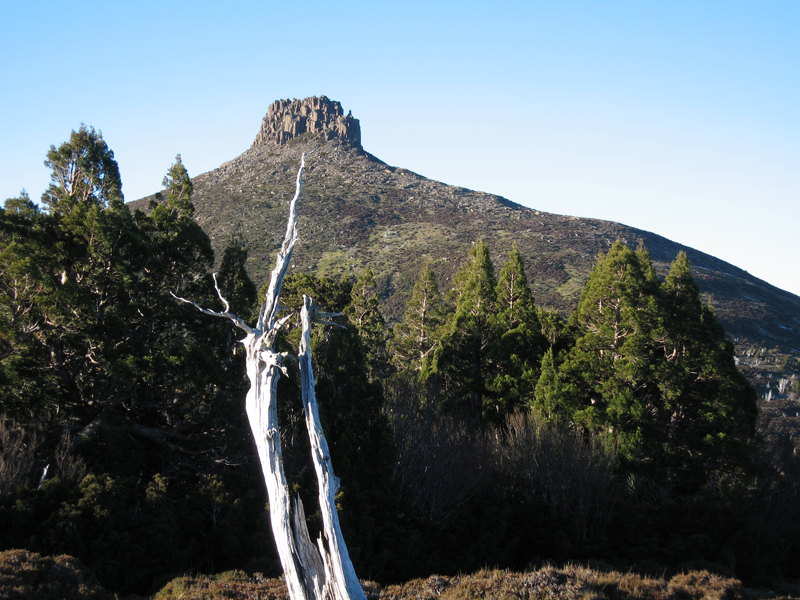
- Mount Pelion East

Highest point
- Elevation: 1,461 m (4,793 ft)
- Prominence: 335 m (1,099 ft)
- Parent peak: Mount Ossa
- Isolation: 3.23 km (2.01 mi)
- Listing: 25th highest mountain in Tasmania
- Coordinates: 41°51′00″S 146°03′36″E

Geography
- Location within Tasmania
- Location: Central Highlands, Tasmania, Australia
- Parent range: Pelion
- Topo map: Tasmap Cathedral 1:25000

Geology
- Rock age: Jurassic
- Mountain type: Dolerite

Climbing
- Easiest route: Walk / hike via the Overland Track from Pelion Gap

Mount Pelion East is a mountain located in the Central Highlands region of Tasmania, Australia. The mountain is situated within the Cradle Mountain-Lake St Clair National Park.

With an elevation of 1,461 metres (4,793 ft) above sea level, the mountain is the 25th highest mountain in Tasmania, slightly higher than the better known Frenchmans Cap at 1,446 metres (4,744 ft). Unlike Mount Pelion West, Pelion East is not a massive mountain, more pinnacle-like, the spire shape having been caused by harsh glacial erosion many thousands of years ago.

== Location and access ==
The mountain summit is at grid reference 225655 UTM Zone 55S and high resolution topographical information is available on Tasmap Cathedral 1:25000. To the west is Mount Pelion West, due north is Lake Ayr, due east is Curate Bluff in the Cathedral Mountain range, and due south is Mount Massif. The mountain is made up of dolerite and the lower slopes are covered in low scrub, including scoparia. This mountain is approximately midway between Pelion Hut and Kia Ora Hut on the Overland Track which passes within 1,000 metres (3,300 ft) of the summit.

Mount Pelion East may be accessed via the Overland Track from Cradle Mountain during the main walking season from November to April when a booking and fee system applies. During this walking period the track is restricted to limited numbers and north-south traffic only is permitted. In the off-season, walking is also allowed from the south at Lake St Clair. Another access route is the combined Arm River and Innes Tracks which passes Lake Ayr and joins the Overland Track at Pelion Plains. A wider overview of the area and access points is available on the Tasmap Cradle Mountain-Lake St Clair map and notes publication.

This mountain can be climbed from the Overland Track which passes by very closely at Pelion Gap, at an elevation of 1,126 metres (3,694 ft).

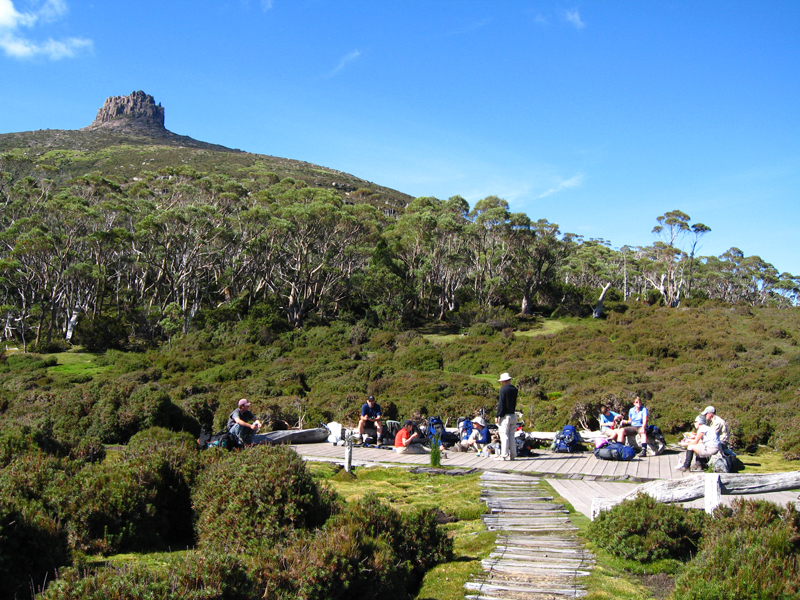
Pelion Gap and Mount Pelion East

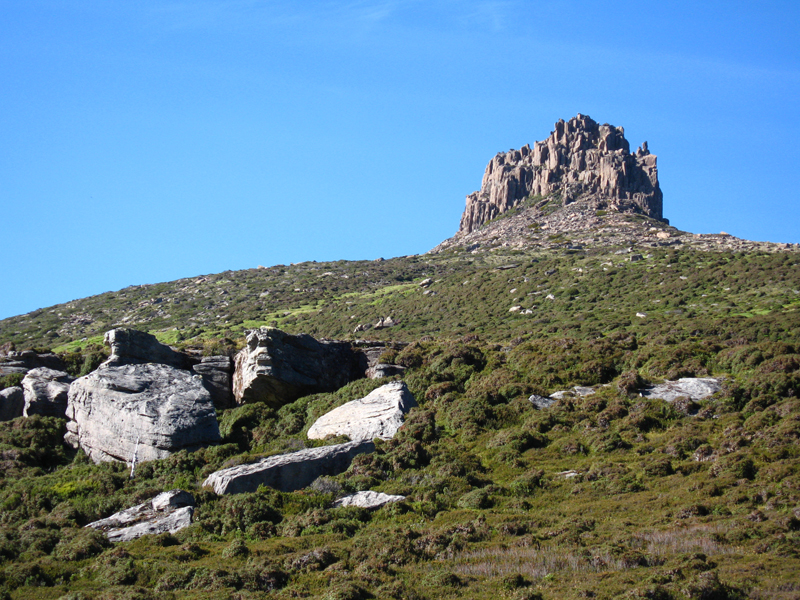
Pelion East from the lower slopes

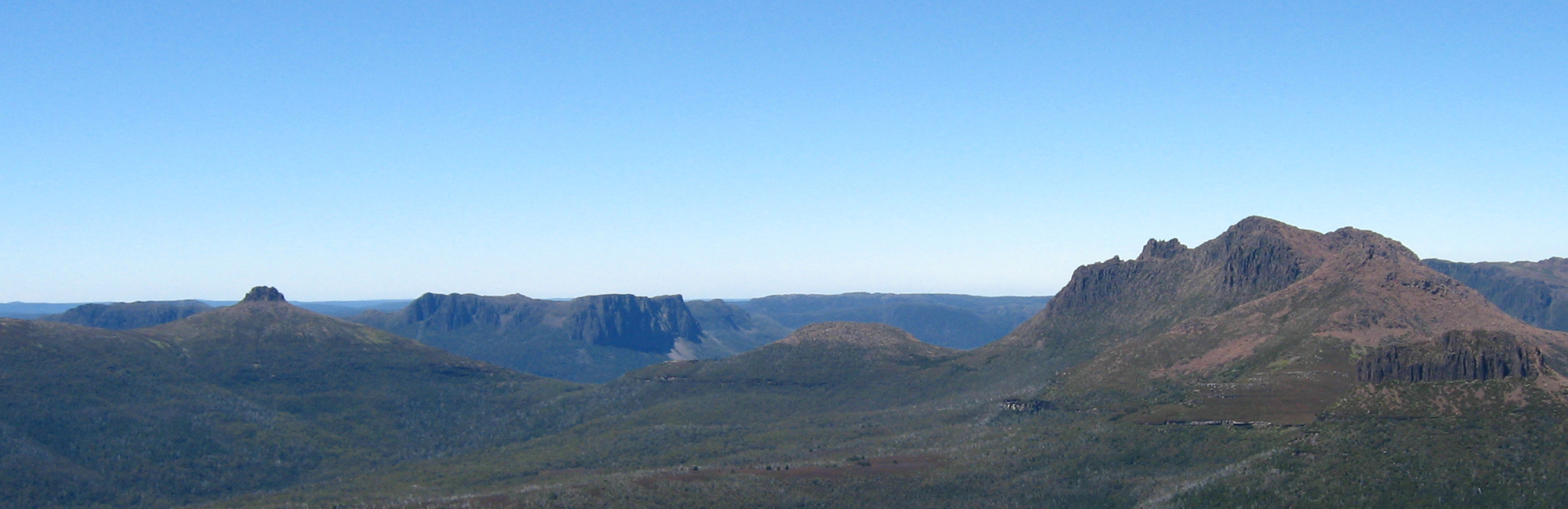
Mount Pelion East left, Cathedral Mountain centre and Mount Ossa right, as seen from Mount Pelion West

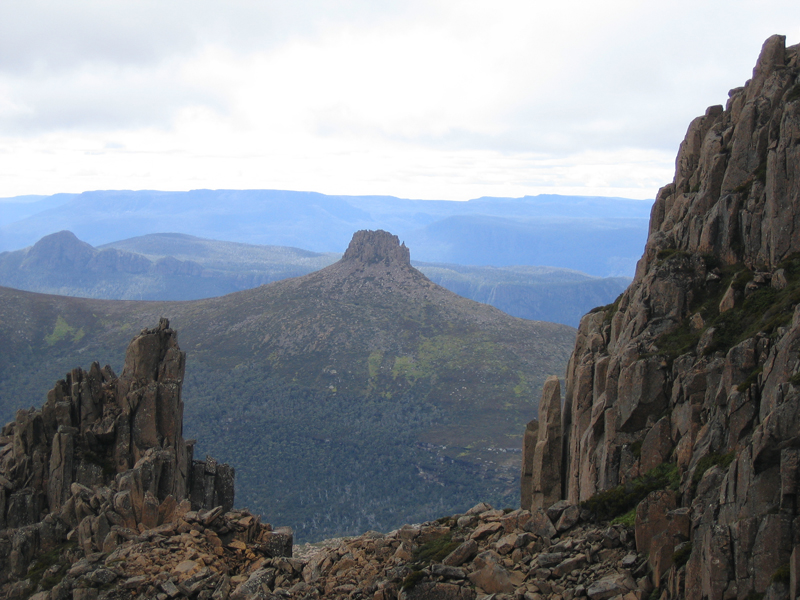
Mount Pelion East from high on Mount Ossa

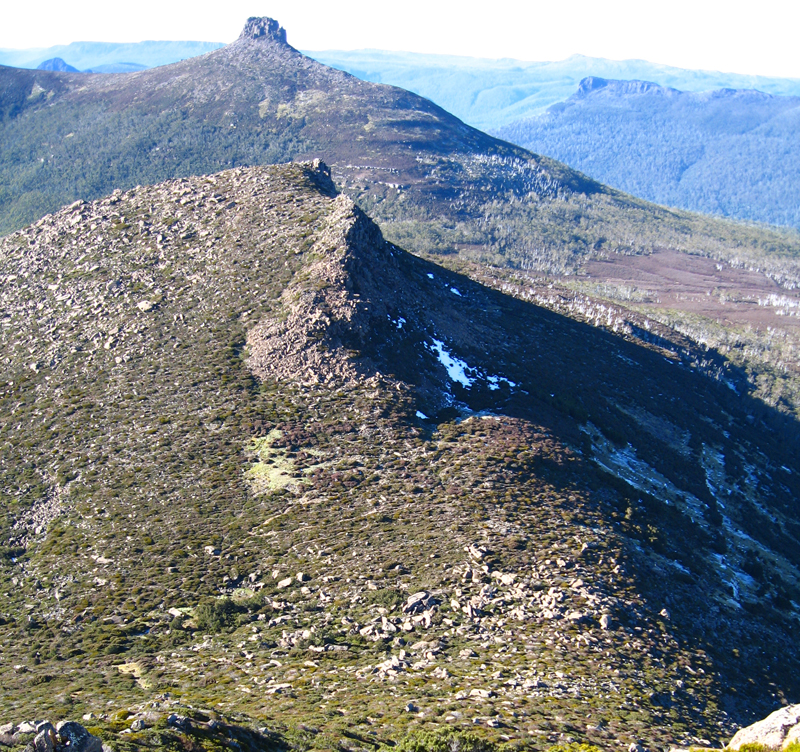
Mount Doris in the foreground and Mount Pelion East behind - from the lower slopes of Mount Ossa

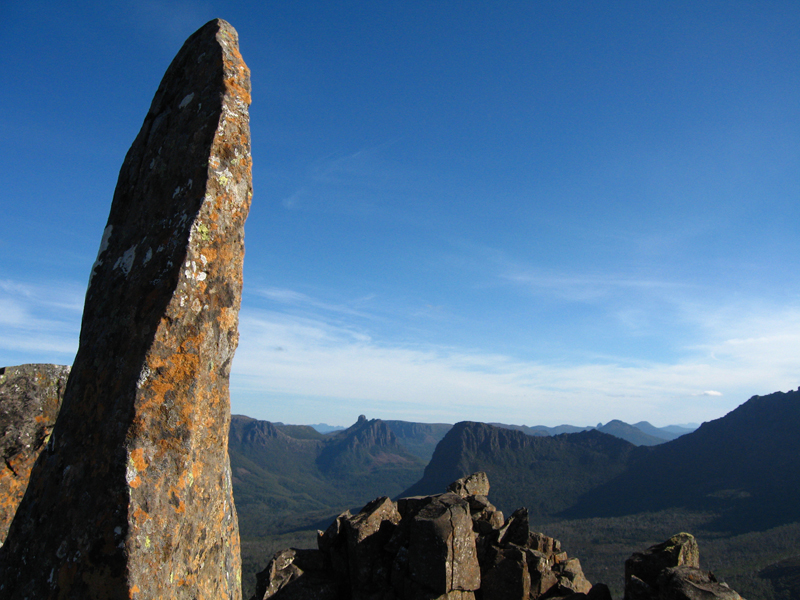
Summit

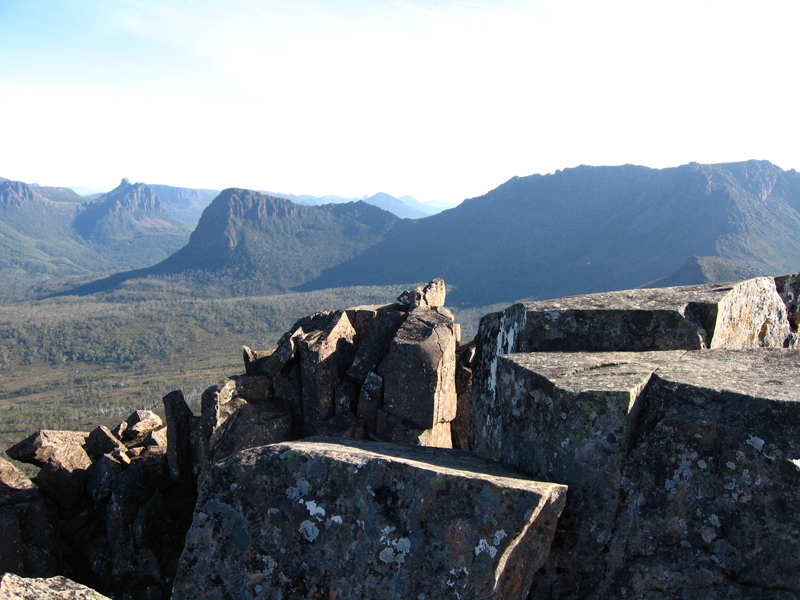
Mount Massif on the left and Mount Ossa on the right as seen from the summit of Mount Pelion East

== See also ==
- List of highest mountains of Tasmania
- Mount Pelion West
