= Cathedral Mountain (Tasmania) =

Mountain in Tasmania, Australia

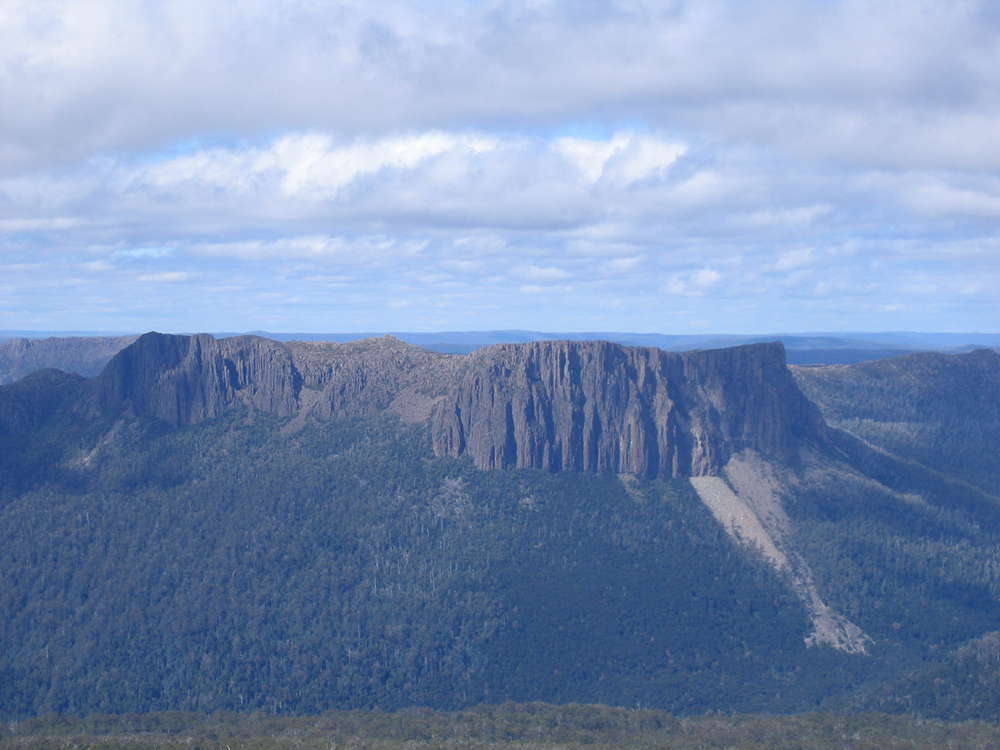
- Cathedral Mountain in 2005

Highest point
- Elevation: 1,387 m (4,551 ft)
- Coordinates: 41°55′S 146°09′E

Geography
- Location within Tasmania
- Location: Central Highlands, Tasmania, Australia
- Parent range: Cathedral
- Topo map: Cathedral TasMap #4236

Cathedral Mountain is a dominant mountain in the Cradle Mountain-Lake St Clair National Park in the central highlands in the state of Tasmania, Australia.

== Location and features ==
Cathedral Mountain has an elevation of 1,387 metres (4,551 ft). The western side of this mountain has a spectacular and extensive cliff face which plunges some 700 metres (2,300 ft) to the Mersey Valley floor.

The mountain is at grid reference 261622 UTM Zone 55G and high resolution topographical information is available on Tasmap Cathedral (4236) 1:25000.

Due west from Cathedral lies Mount Ossa, Tasmania's highest mountain, due north is Mount Pillinger, due east is Mount Ragoona and due south is Castle Crag in the Du Cane Range. Directly beneath the cliff faces of Cathedral Mountain runs the upper reaches of the Mersey River. The Overland Track passes within 2 kilometres (1.2 mi) of the southern side of this mountain. Most features in the general area of Cathedral Mountain have church-based names. These include; Chalice Lake, Chapter Lake, Cloister Lagoon, Convent Hill, Bishop Peak, Curate Bluff, Vicar Bluff and Dean Bluff.

Within the last three decades, a huge portion of the upper part of the mountain has broken away and catastrophically crashed through the rainforest hundreds of metres below completely obliterating it, creating a huge rock skree which covers several hundred metres and almost reaches the banks of the Mersey River. The resulting scar is very noticeable from many kilometres distant.

== Access ==
Access to the spectacular and dominant side of Cathedral mountain is mainly via the Overland Track from Cradle Mountain during the main walking season (November to April) when a booking and fee system applies and walking the track is restricted to limited numbers and also to north–south traffic only. In the off-season walking is also allowed from the Lake St Clair (southern) end. Other access tracks include the combined Arm River and Innes Tracks as well as the Lees Paddocks track. There is also a track that links from the Lees Paddocks area adjacent Vicar Bluff to Kia Ora. These alternative access routes ultimately link to the Overland Track which only gives access to viewing the sheer and rugged face of the mountain from the western side of the Mersey River. A wider overview of the area is available on the Tasmap Cradle Mountain-Lake St Clair Map & Notes publication.

To ascend the mountain, the most commonly used route is from the southern end of the Mersey Forrest Road on the eastern side of Lake Rowallan via the Moses Creek track. Then to Chapter Lake, Grail Falls, Chalice Lake and Tent Tarn. From Tent Tarn to the Cathedral Mountain summit is two kilometres with the terrain being mainly trackless, although occasional cairns are visible.

== See also ==
- Cradle Mountain-Lake St Clair National Park
- List of mountains in Australia § Tasmania
