= Ironstone Mountain =

Mountain in Tasmania, Australia

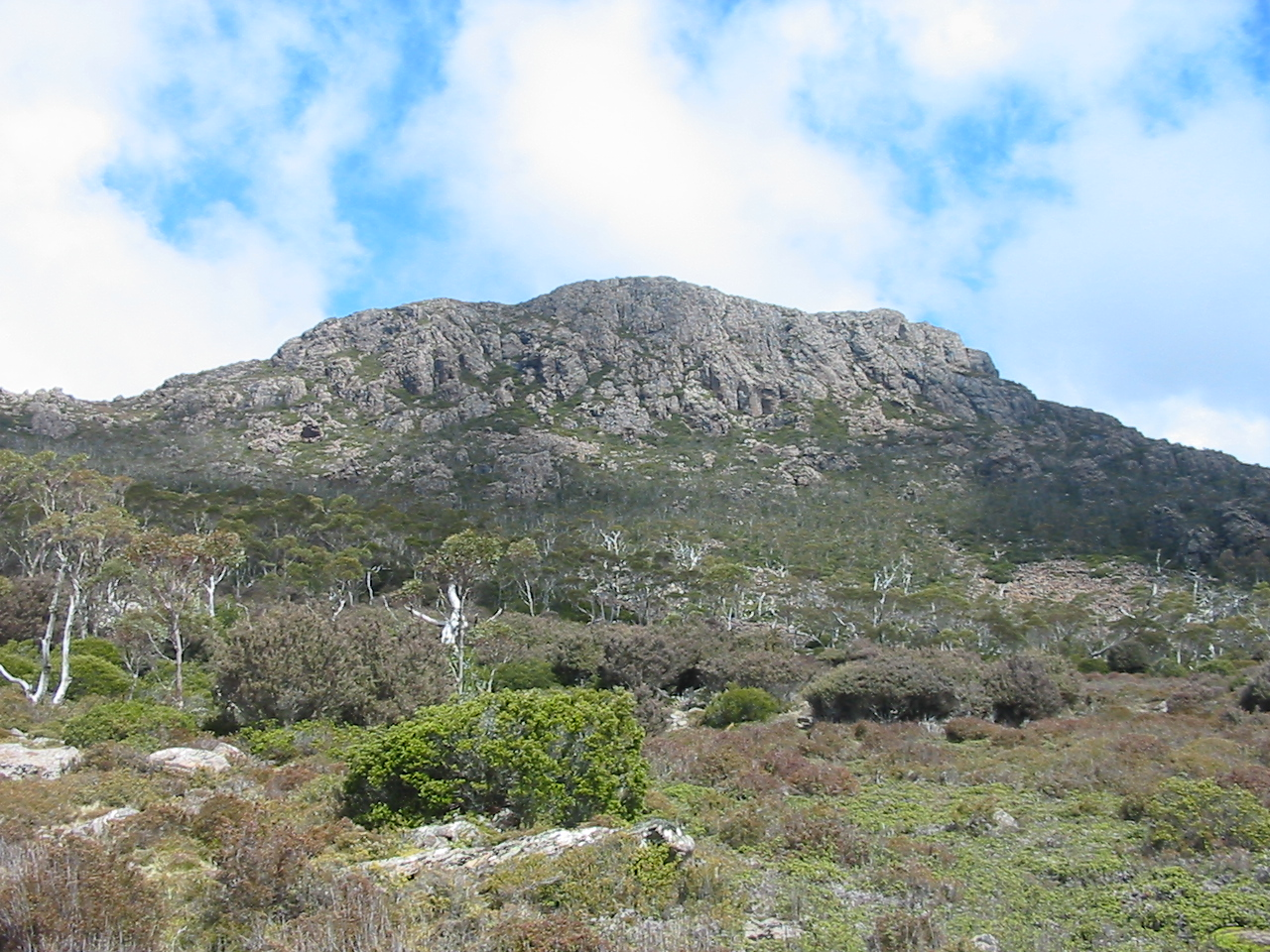
- Visually dominant slightly lower part of the mountain

Highest point
- Elevation: 1,444 m (4,738 ft)AHD
- Prominence: 194 m (636 ft)
- Coordinates: 41°42′36″S 146°28′12″E

Geography
- Location within Tasmania
- Location: Central Highlands, Tasmania, Australia
- Parent range: Great Western Tiers
- Topo map: Tasmap Lake Mackenzie (4438) 1:25000

Geology
- Rock age: Jurassic

The Ironstone Mountain is a mountain located in the Central Highlands region of Tasmania, Australia. Part of Great Western Tiers escarpment, the mountain is situated south of the small country village of Mole Creek.

With an elevation of 1,444 metres (4,738 ft) above sea level, the mountain is the highest peak of the Great Western Tiers and has a nearby companion lake, Lake Ironstone. The highest point is marked with a trig point, but more dominant is the slightly lower part of the mountain depicted here in the information box.

== Location and access ==
The mountain is at grid reference 563819 UTM Zone 55S (Universal Transverse Mercator coordinate system) and high resolution topographical information is available on Tasmap Lake Mackenzie (4438) 1:25000.

Access to Ironstone Mountain is mainly from two walking tracks. The closest access is from the north via Mole Creek, Caveside and Westrope Road to the Western Creek Track which follows the eastern side of the gully formed by Western Creek. Another access route is from the east via Deloraine, Meander, Smoko Road and the Mount Ironstone Track. This track starts 2 kilometres (1.2 mi) south of Mother Cummings Peak, another dominant landmark in the region.

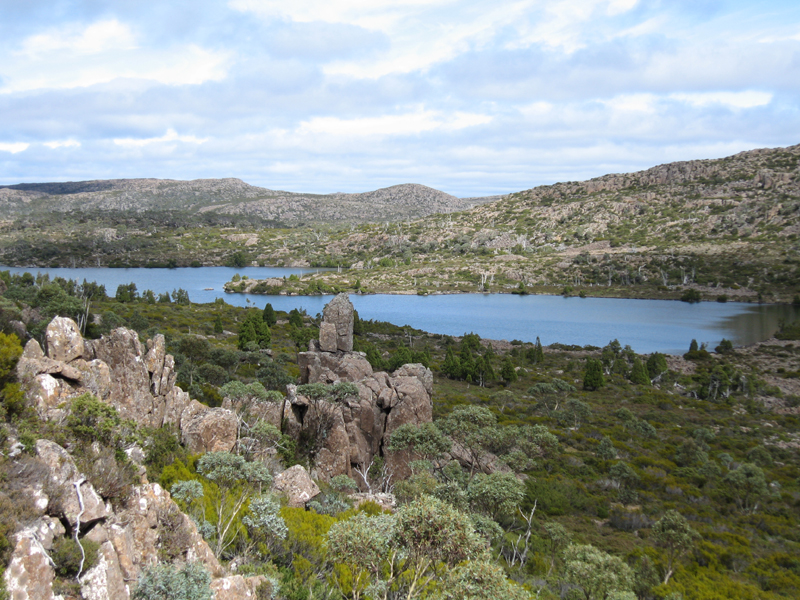
Lake Ironstone

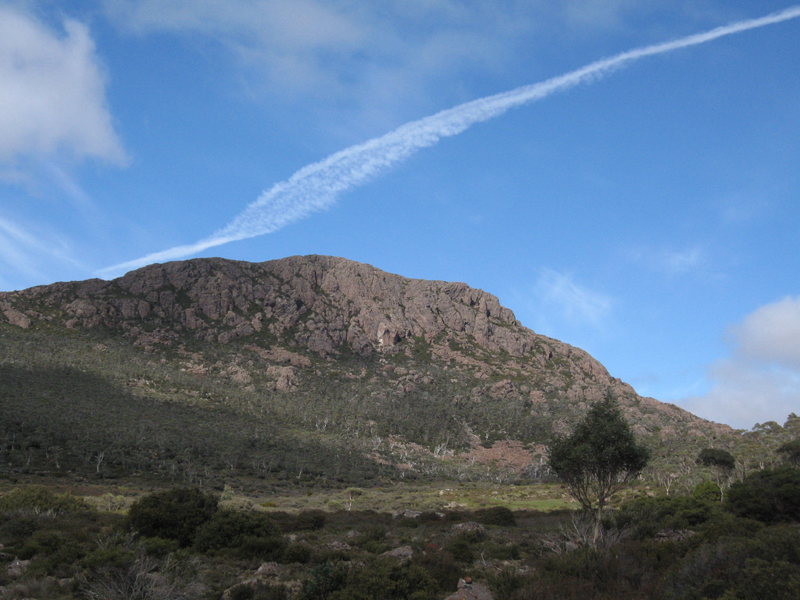
Jet trail over Ironstone

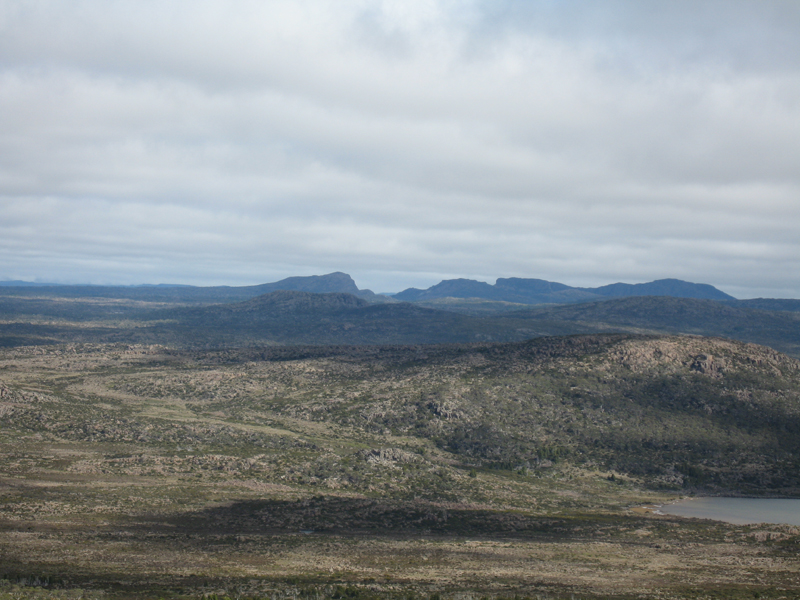
The Walls of Jerusalem from Ironstone

== See also ==
- List of highest mountains of Tasmania
