= Mother Cummings Peak =

Mountain in Tasmania, Australia

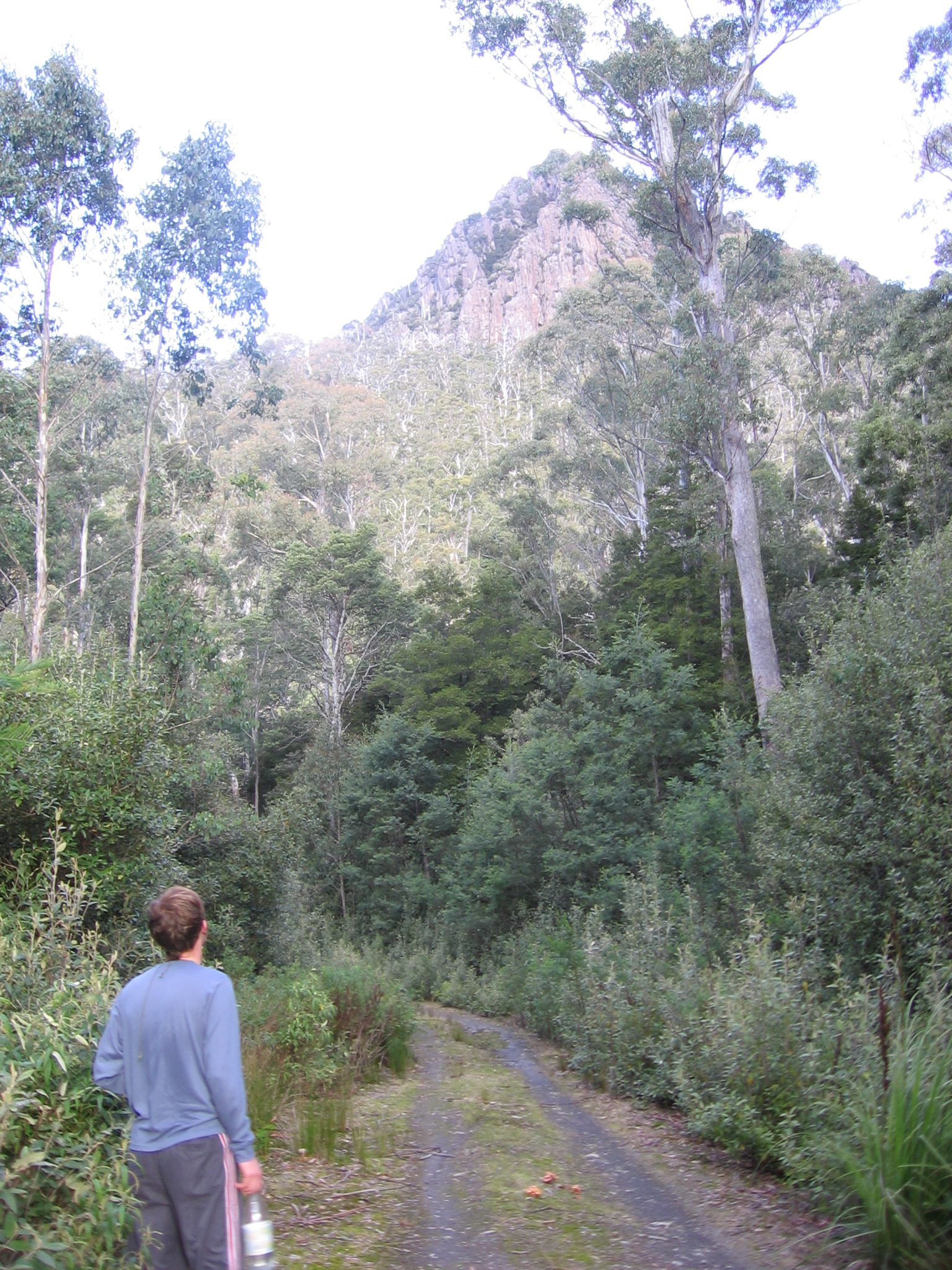

Highest point
- Elevation: 1,255 m (4,117 ft)
- Prominence: 180 m (590 ft)
- Parent peak: Ironstone Mountain
- Isolation: 11.89 km (7.39 mi)
- Listing: Highest mountains of Tasmania
- Coordinates: 41°40′39″S 146°32′37″E

Geography
- Location within Tasmania
- Country: Australia
- State: Tasmania
- Region: Central Highlands
- Range coordinates: 41°55′48″S 147°10′12″E
- Parent range: Great Western Tiers

The Mother Cummings Peak is one of the prominent peaks on the Great Western Tiers located in the Central Highlands region of Tasmania, Australia.

With an estimated elevation of between 1,260 and 1,270 metres (4,134 and 4,167 ft) above sea level, the summit of Cummings Head offers 360 degree views. The summit can be reached in about 1 – 2 hours (depending on fitness), and the track is rather steep. Two walking tracks lead to the summit: one from the north via Mole Creek, and the other from the south from the upper Meander Valley.

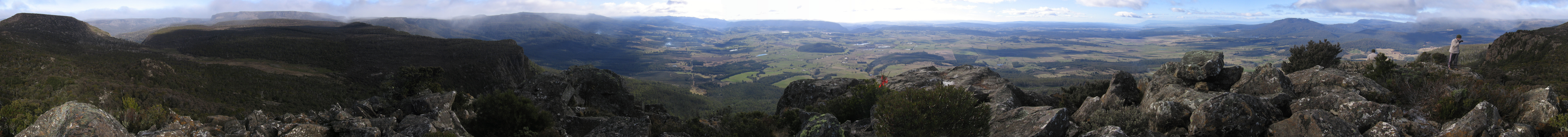
Panoramic from the summit of Mother Cummings Peak

== See also ==
- List of mountains in Tasmania
