= Mount Geryon =

Mountain in Tasmania, Australia

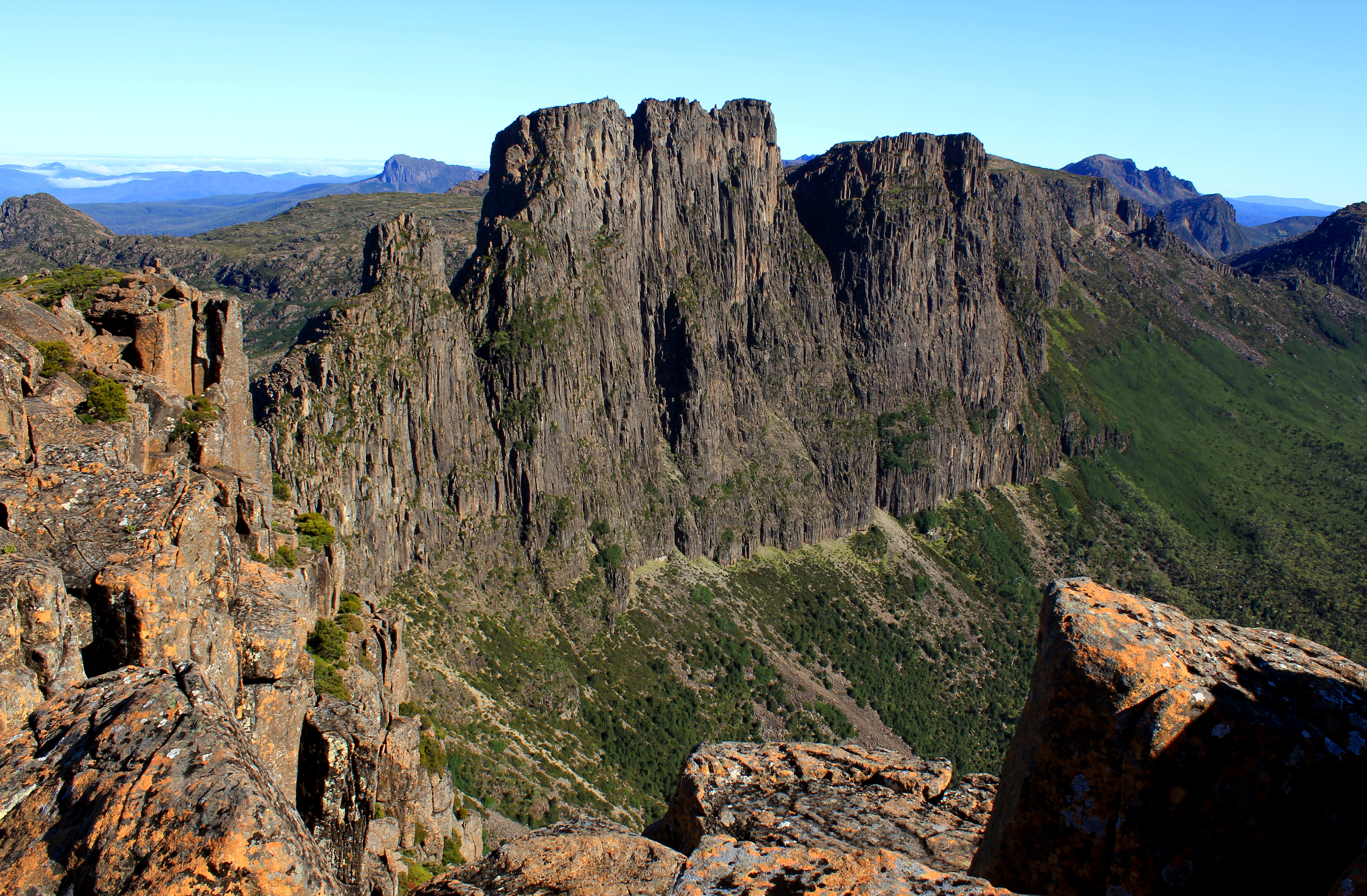
- The east face of Mount Geryon, as seen from the summit of the Acropolis

Highest point
- Elevation: North peak: 1,516 m (4,974 ft) AHD; South peak: 1,509 m (4,951 ft) AHD
- Prominence: North peak: 56 m (184 ft); South peak: 39 m (128 ft)
- Isolation: North peak: 1.02 km (3,346 ft); South peak: 0.18 km (591 ft)
- Listing: North peak: 12th highest mountain in Tasmania; South peak: 15th highest mountain in Tasmania
- Coordinates: 41°55′41″S 146°03′17″E

Geography
- Location within Tasmania
- Location: Central Highlands of Tasmania, Australia
- Parent range: Du Cane

Geology
- Rock age: Jurassic
- Mountain type: Dolerite

Climbing
- First ascent: Hugh Gordon, David W. Wilson, 1937

Mount Geryon is a mountain in the Central Highlands region of the Australian island state of Tasmania. The mountain is part of the Du Cane Range and is situated within the Cradle Mountain-Lake St Clair National Park, one of several national parks of the Tasmanian Wilderness World Heritage Area.

The mountain was given its current name in 1935 by Malcolm Livingstone Urquhart, who named it after Geryon, the three-headed monster of Greek mythology. Like Geryon, the mountain has three main summits: north peak, the highest; south peak; and the Foresight in between, named for its resemblance of a rifle sight. A fourth, lower peak, south of south peak, is known as southern spur.. Of the three main summits, the Foresight receives the fewest ascents.

Mount Geryon's north peak has an elevation of 1,516 metres (4,974 feet) above sea level and is the twelfth-highest mountain in Tasmania. The south peak, with an elevation of 1,509 metres (4,951 ft), is the state's fifteenth-highest peak.

Mount Geryon is a major feature of Cradle Mountain-Lake St Clair National Park, and an occasional venue for bushwalkers and mountain climbers. The mountain is most admired by climbers for its east face, which is up to 400 metres (1,300 ft) in height – Tasmania's highest dolerite cliff, easily the greatest precipice in the national park, and similar in height to the southeast face of Frenchmans Cap, Tasmania's highest quartzite cliff. Both are glacial headwalls.

The first recorded ascent of the north peak of Mount Geryon was in 1937, by Hugh Gordon and David W. Wilson. The south peak was first climbed in November 1950, by John Daniel, Keith Lancaster, Jim Turner and Chris Binks, with the same group also first ascending the Foresight, in January 1951. A period of exploratory mountaineering on Mount Geryon followed, from the 1960s onward, with winter ascents, traverses of all four summits in both directions, and new climbing routes. There are presently more than 30 routes on the mountain, up to 450 metres (1,480 ft) in length. Geryon's east face was first climbed, following a 370-metre (1,210 ft) route to the summit of the Foresight, in December 1961, by Bob Jones and Bernie Lyons.

The peaks and cols of Geryon are features of a sharp rocky ridge or arête extending north-south and connecting the main massif of the Du Cane Range with the Acropolis. East of this great arête is the Narcissus River valley and, to the west, Pine Valley, the valley of Cephissus Creek. Both were once occupied by glaciers that shaped this landscape, flowing toward what is now Lake St Clair.

The Mount Geryon massif itself extends from the Acropolis-Geryon saddle, northward to a razorback dolerite saddle about 100 metres (330 feet) north of the summit of Geryon's north peak, a total distance of about 800 metres (2,600 feet). This northern saddle forms a bridge connecting Mount Geryon to parts of the Du Cane Range further north, and is the most common approach for ascents of the north peak.

Currently, some Tasmanian Government online maps label the feature (spot height 1507 m) approximately 270 metres (890 feet) north of Geryon's north peak as being Mount Geryon. This is incorrect.

The lakes of The Labyrinth, to the west on the opposite side of Pine Valley, are often used as foreground in photographs of Mount Geryon. Sunsets illuminate the mountain's west face and its three main peaks are prominent. The great east face of Geryon can be seen from Bert Nichols Hut on the Overland Track, or from the Acropolis.

== See also ==
- List of highest mountains of Tasmania
