= Dry's Bluff =

Mountain in Tasmania, Australia

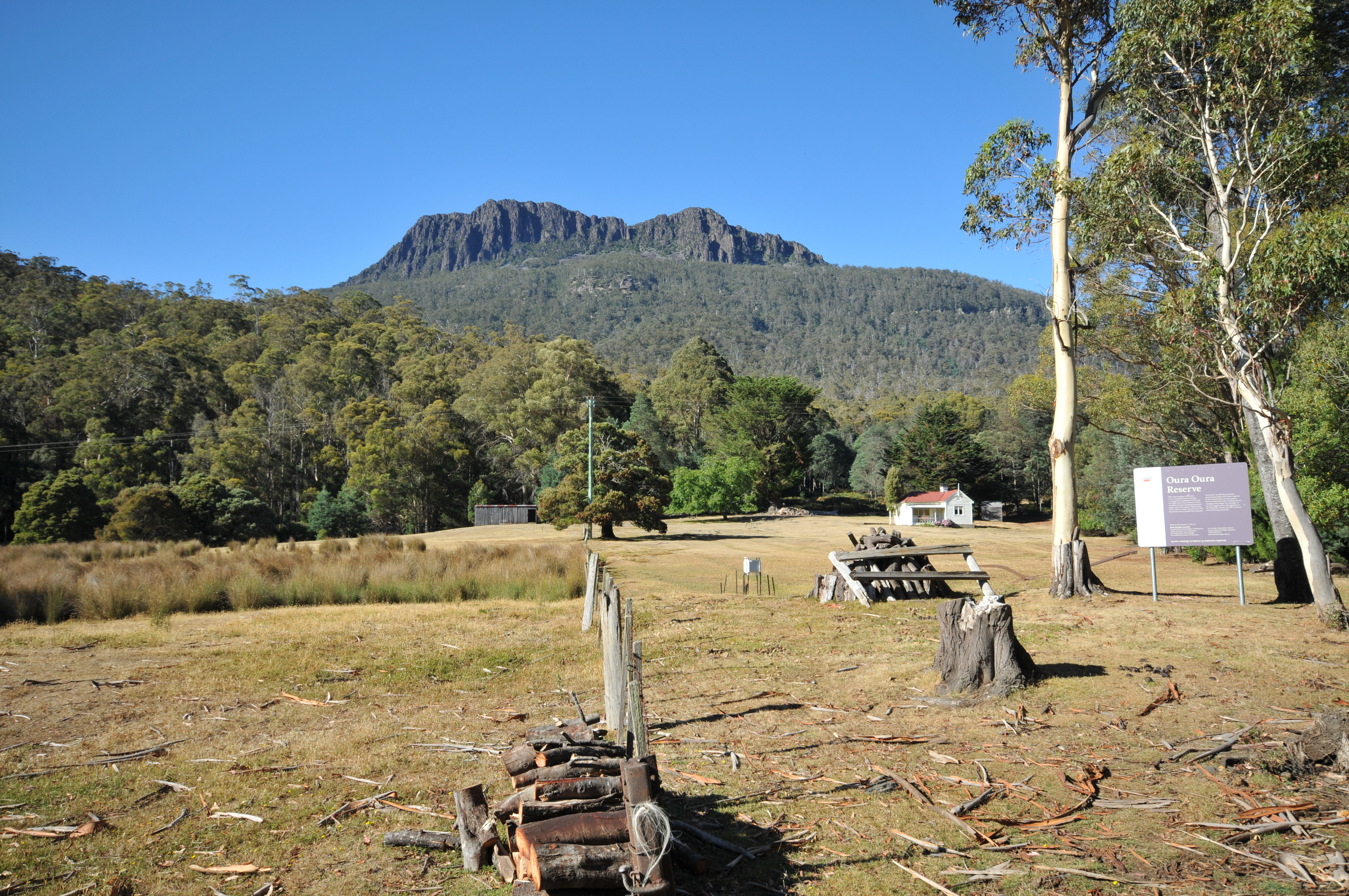
- Dry's Bluff

Highest point
- Elevation: 1,340 m (4,400 ft)
- Prominence: 190 m (620 ft)
- Coordinates: 41°43′00″S 146°48′00″E

Geography
- Location within Tasmania
- Location: Tasmania, Australia
- Parent range: Great Western Tiers

Dry's Bluff is a mountain in the Great Western Tiers Range in Tasmania. The walk to its summit is listed in The Abels as one of the hardest day walks in Tasmania with an elevation gain of over 1000m from the base of the plateau. Access to the start of the walk is through Bob Brown's residence Oura Oura which has the sign Trespassers Welcome on the gate.

== History ==
It is probably named after Richard Dry, the first Tasmanian-born Premier of Tasmania, and son of Richard Dry Snr. an Irish political convict. Richard Dry Snr. was granted large amounts of land at Quamby Plains 30km north of the mountain.

== Geography and geology ==
Dry's Bluff lies just south of Liffey at the edge of the central plateau and its summit is 1,340 metres (4,400 ft) above sea level. It is made of Jurassic dolerite columns which are characteristic of the Great Western Tiers.

== Access ==
The walk up Dry's Bluff starts at Oura Oura reserve, owned by Bush Heritage Australia. It then ascends over 1000m in 2.5 km through dry forests, past scree slopes, through the cliff line and into alpine scrub.

== Gallery ==
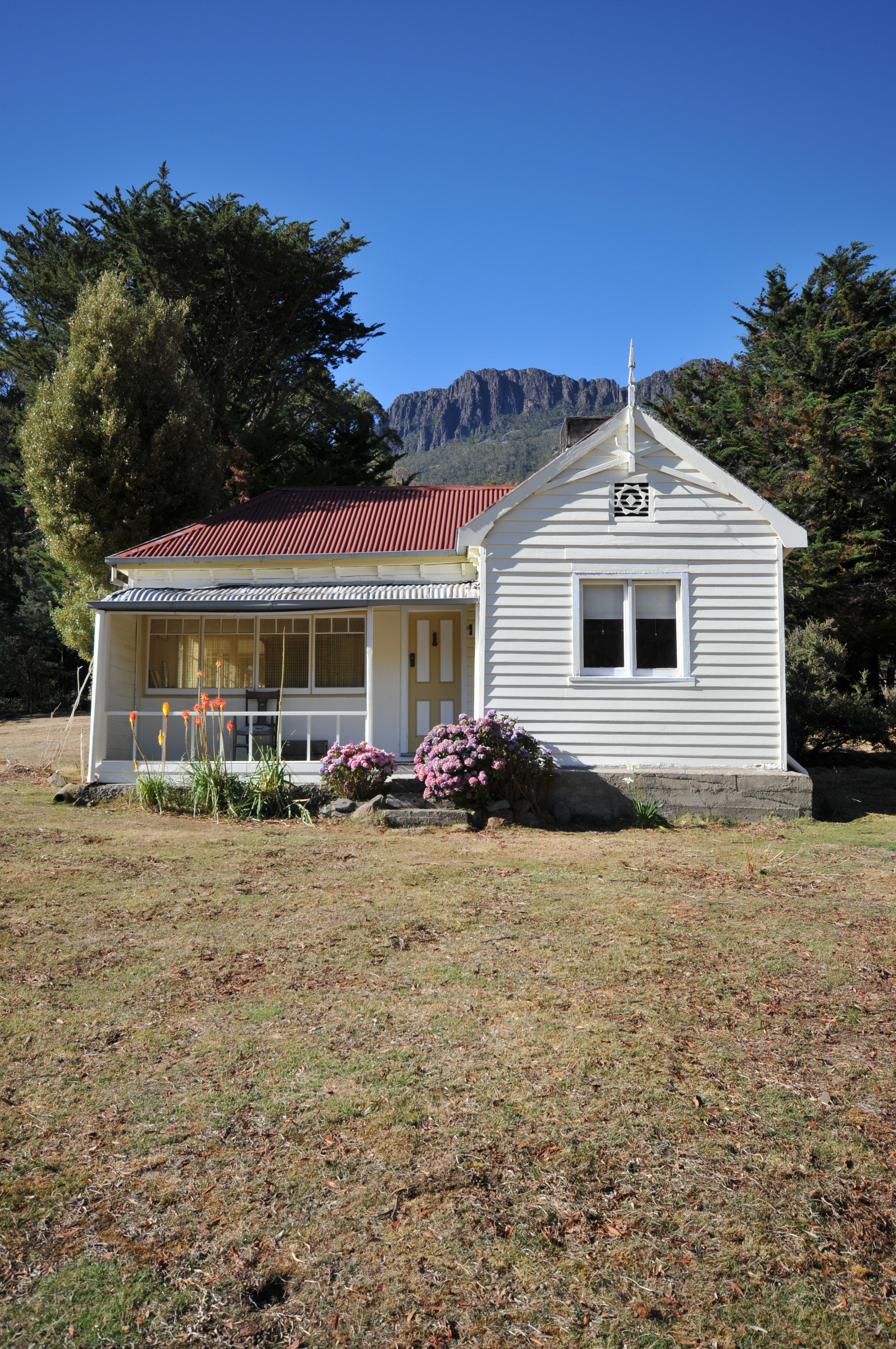
Oura Oura with Dry's Bluff in the background
