= Great Western Tiers =

Mountain range in Tasmania, Australia

- Kooparoona Niara
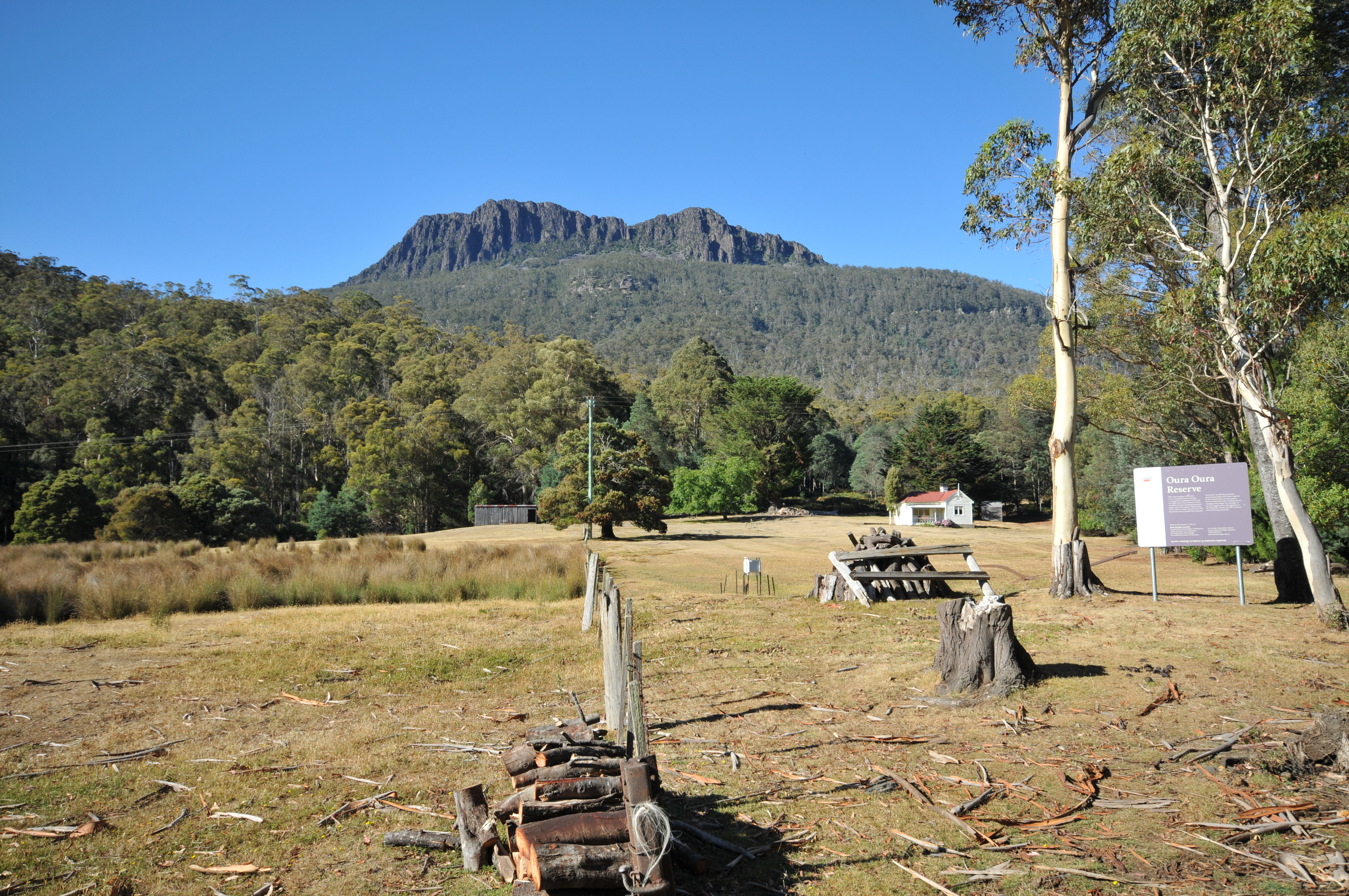
- Drys Bluff, part of the Great Western Tiers

Highest point
- Peak: Ironstone Mountain
- Elevation: 1,444 m (4,738 ft); AHD
- Coordinates: 41°42′36″S 146°28′12″E

Dimensions
- Length: 100 km (62 mi) NE/SW

Geography
- Location within Tasmania
- Country: Australia
- State: Tasmania
- District: Central Highlands
- Range coordinates: 41°55′48″S 147°10′12″E

Geology
- Rock age: Jurassic
- Rock type: Dolerite

The Great Western Tiers (Palawa kani: Kooparoona Niara) are a collection of mountain bluffs that form the northern edge of the Central Highlands plateau in Tasmania, Australia. The bluffs are contained within the Tasmanian Wilderness World Heritage Site.

The bluffs stretch northwest to southeast over 100 kilometres (62 mi) from the 1,420-metre (4,660 ft) Western Bluff near the town of Mole Creek to the 1,210-metre (3,970 ft) Millers Bluff, approximately 25 kilometres (16 mi) west of Campbell Town. During the late 19th century the Tiers were known as the Great Western Range.

== Features ==
The Central Highlands, or Tasmanian central plateau, was uplifted from the lower Meander Valley, most probably in the Eocene epoch though possibly earlier, forming the Tiers' escarpment. The plateau's north-east boundary, which ranges from 760 metres (2,490 ft)–1,500 metres (4,900 ft), originated in extensive Tertiary faulting.

This escarpment divides the high, rocky, sparsely inhabited central plateau from the fertile lower land of the Meander Valley and the northern midlands. The edge of the tiers have prominent cliffs and columns of Jurassic dolerite. The highest peak in the tiers is the 1,444-metre (4,738 ft) Ironstone Mountain. Unlike most of the bluffs this mountain is not visible from the Meander Valley, but is south of the escarpment. The escarpment has a distinct concave profile. Cliffs and scree slopes are common features. The dolerite is so prominent as the older rocks that overlay them are softer and have been eroded away. In places dolerite columns have collapsed into scree slopes.

The face of the tiers has been eroded and retreated approximately 4 miles (6.4 km) since their formation, leaving the mountain Quamby Bluff as a solitary outlier. The central plateau's landform has been changed by glaciation. Valleys under the tiers are filled with talus, mostly bounders with a 25% mix of soil formed from boulder weathering.

== Peaks ==
The peaks and bluffs of the Great Western Tiers include:

- Brady's lookout, at 1,371 metres (4,498 ft). Named after the bushranger Matthew Brady.
- Billop Bluff
- Dry's Bluff at 1,298 metres (4,259 ft). Origin of the Liffey River.
- Ironstone Mountain, at 1,444 metres (4,738 ft)
- Millers Bluff, at 1,210 metres (3,970 ft)
- Mother Cummings Peak, at 1,255 metres (4,117 ft)
- Mount Blackwood
- Mount Parmeener
- Neals Bluff
- Panorama Hill
- Projection Bluff
- Quamby Bluff, at 1,227 metres (4,026 ft)
- Western Bluff, at 1,420 metres (4,660 ft)

== Gallery ==
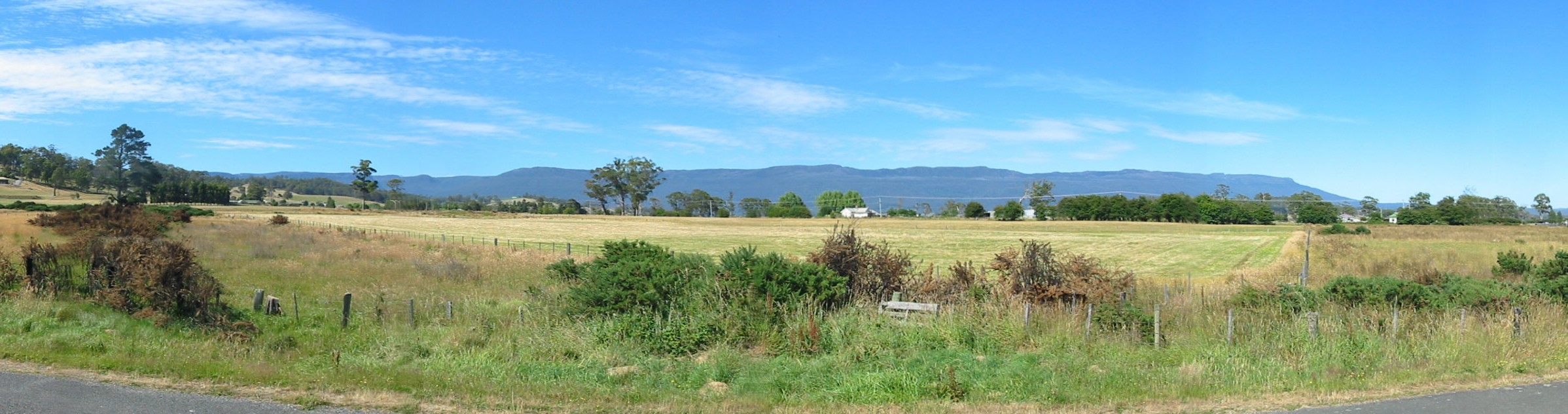
Panorama from Chudleigh towards the Great Western Tiers

== See also ==
- List of highest mountains of Tasmania

== Bibliography ==
- Fish, Graham L.; Yaxley, Murray L. (1966). Behind the scenery : the geological background to Tasmanian landforms. Hobart: Tasmanian Education Department.
- Forestry Commission of Tasmania (October 1990). Quamby Bluff Forest Reserve Management Plan. ISBN 0-7246-3507-6.
- Lloyd, Sarah (2012). The edge, a natural history of Tasmania's Great Western Tiers. Friends of Jacky's Marsh Inc. ISBN 978-0-646-57082-2.
- Whitworth, Robert Percy (1877). Baillière's Tasmanian gazetteer and road quide : containing the most recent and accurate information as to every place in the colony. Hobart: F.F. Bailliere.
