= Quamby Bluff =

Mountain in Tasmania, Australia

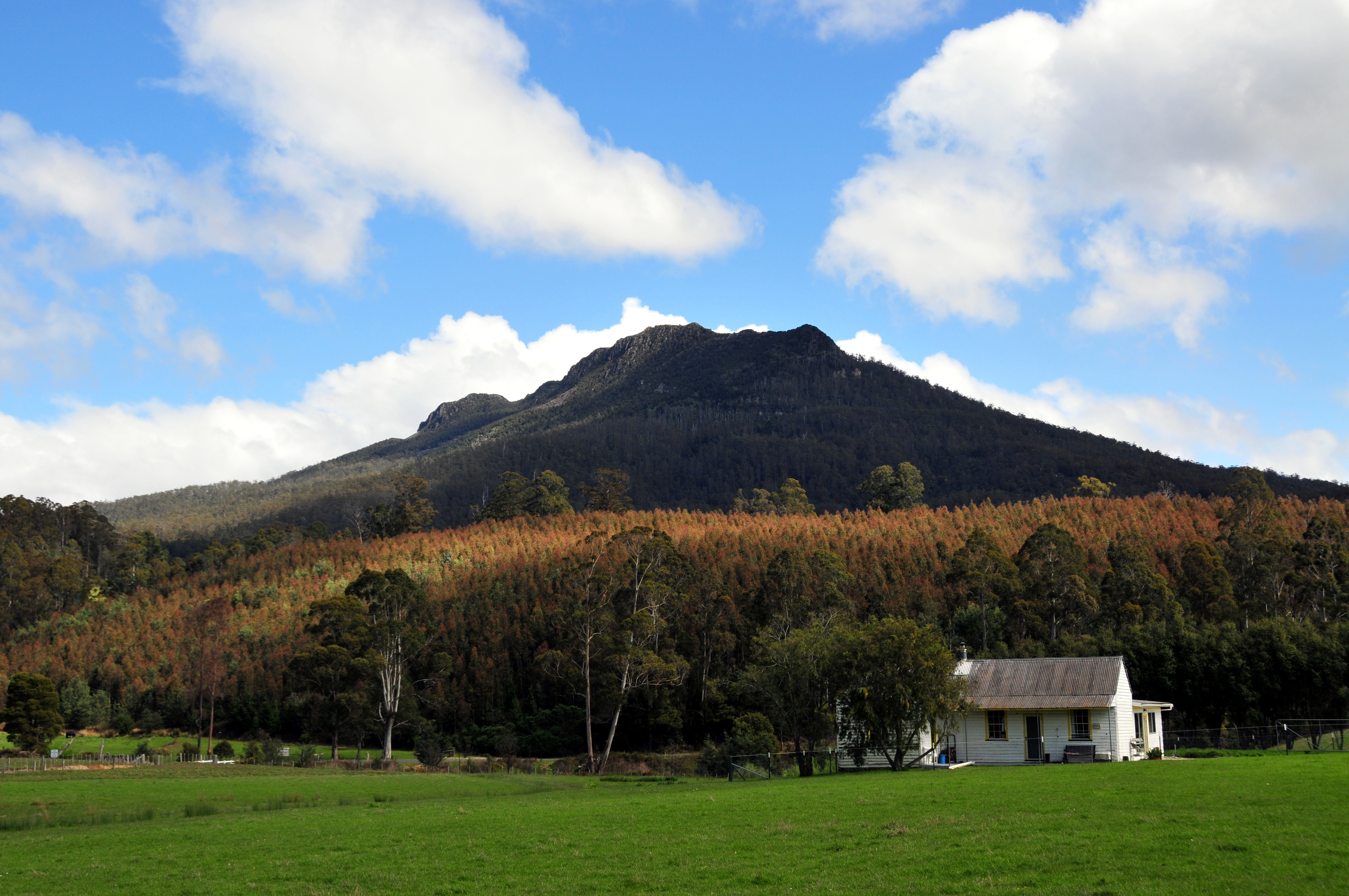
- Quamby Bluff

Highest point
- Elevation: 1,227 (Note: The bluff is listed as 1,228 metres (4,029 ft) in the Quamby Bluff 1:25000 Topographic/Cadastral Map Number#4638 published by TASMAP, by 1,227 metres (4,026 ft) in other sources) m (4,026 ft)AHD
- Prominence: 494 m (1,621 ft)
- Coordinates: 41°39′37″S 146°43′20″E

Geography
- Location within Tasmania
- Location: Tasmania, Australia
- Parent range: Great Western Tiers
- Topo map: TASMAP 1:25,000 Quamby Bluff

Quamby Bluff is a mountain in Northern Tasmania, Australia that is an outlying part of the Great Western Tiers mountain range.

== Geography and Geology ==
Quamby Bluff lies 19 kilometres (12 mi) from Deloraine by road, just north of the main escarpment of the Great Western Tiers mountain range. The name Quamby has been variously stated to be derived from Quarmby, the district in Huddersfield Yorkshire, or from a Viking word that means "mill farm", though most likely from local Tasmanian languages meaning either a "place of rest" or a "good camping place". Daniel Bunce in his 1859 book of memoirs postulated that the name was derived from an incident where a British colonist in the area aimed his gun at an Indigenous Tasmanian. The Tasmanian fell to his knees and yelled "Quamby!" which was interpreted to mean "Spare me!" or "Mercy!".

The Tasmanian central plateau was uplifted from the lower Meander Valley, most probably in the Eocene epoch though possibly earlier, forming the escarpment of the Great Western Tiers. The face of the tiers has been eroded and retreated approximately 4 miles (6.4 km) since then, leaving Quamby Bluff as a solitary outlier. The bluff has similar geology to the rest of the range, and a similar form with cliffs, and talus (a mixture of scree and soil) slopes. Due to its prominence and isolation, views from the top cover a large portion of Northern Tasmania. In the right conditions Mount Strzelecki on Flinders Island, approximately 200 kilometres (120 mi) distant, can be seen from the peak. Its largely flat peak is 1,227 metres (4,026 ft) above sea level. The mountain's sandstone and mudstone base is of Triassic original and lies in near horizontal strata. Dolerite rocks formed during the Jurassic period intrude through this base. Erosion has formed the dolerite into steep cliffs and scree slopes which dominate the top of the mountain. The bluff has outcrops of Proterozoic era rocks that are the amongst the oldest found in Tasmania. These rocks are regarded as metamorphosed sediments containing a laminate of graphite, mica quartz-sericite and sericite schists.

The area around the mountain has an annual average rainfall of 1,100 millimetres (43 in) with a predominance in winter. The rainfall increases significantly with altitude, approximately 1,078 millimetres (42.4 in) measured at 300 metres (980 ft) rising to 2,300 millimetres (91 in) at the summit. Snow is seen above 1,000 metres (3,300 ft) at any time of year, and there is regular snowfall on top of the bluff. Due to its exposed position the summit often experiences severe weather conditions.

== Habitation and landuse ==
The original inhabitants of the area were the Pallittorre Clan of the Northern Nation of Aboriginal Tasmanians. The North Midlands Nation name for Quamby Bluff was lartitickitheker (lar.tit.ick.it.he.ker). There are caves south of Meander, in the Great Western Tiers, with deposits showing aboriginal habitation, though these have not been dated. The deposits were either left by the Pallittorre, or their neighbours the Luggermairrernerpairre who were part of the neighbouring Big River tribe. The Pallittorre probably inhabited the area for thousands of years; aborigines are believed to have lived in Tasmania for more than 30,000 years. They maintained cleared grassy plains by regular careful burning, and used this method also to control undergrowth in the forests. This land management technique enabled easier hunting and food gathering. Over an 18 Day period in July, 1827, 100 Indigenous Pallittorre people were massacred by Corporals William Shiner and James Lingren from 40th Regt; stockmen Thomas Baker, James Cubit, Henry Smith and William White in response to the killing of three stockmen.

There has not been a survey of the mountain for aboriginal artefacts. Stumps and trails remain as evidence of logging by European settlers; the remains of a 1940s sawmill can be seen on the Eastern slopes.

== Flora and fauna ==
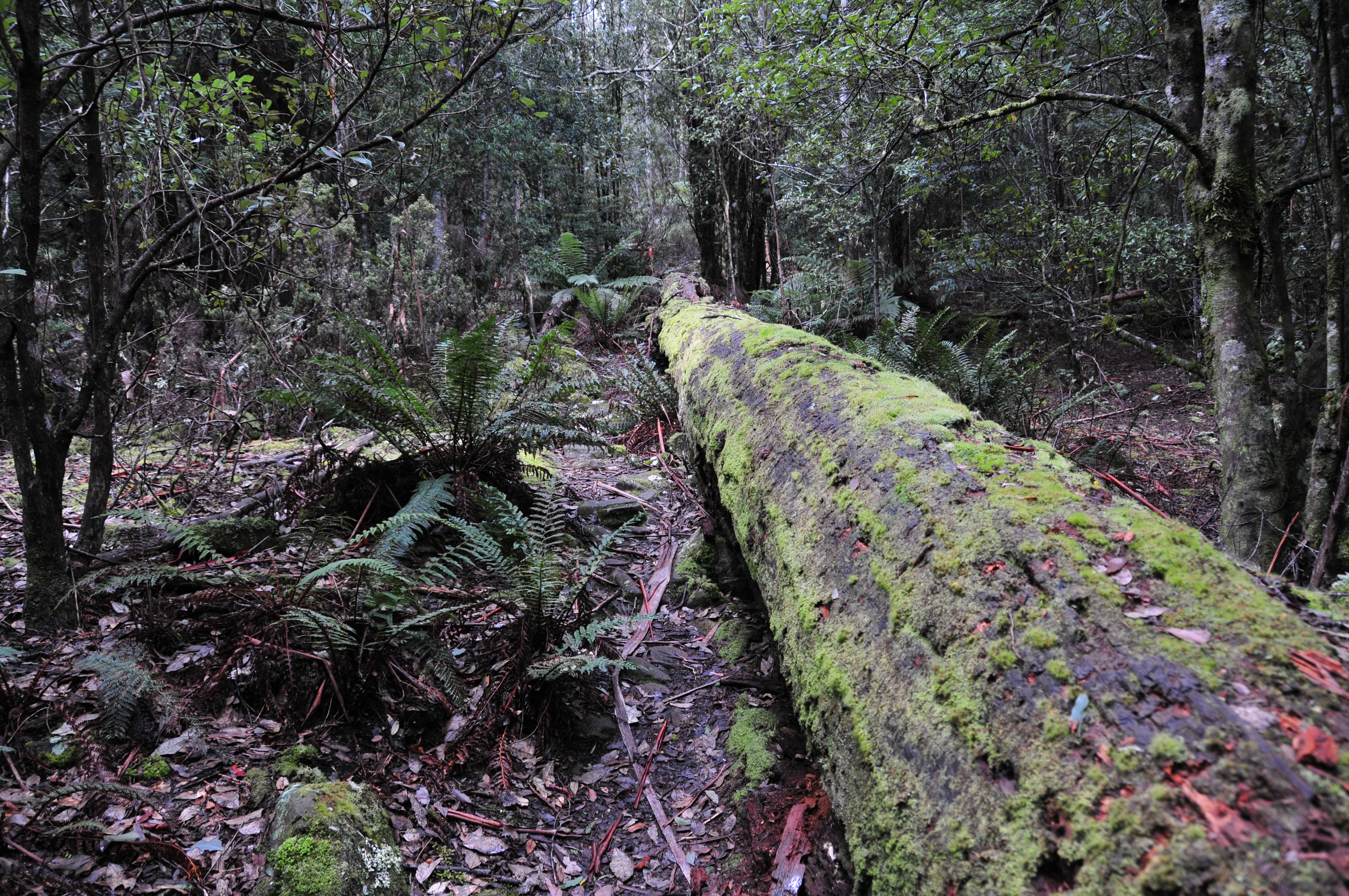
Forest on the fairy glade track

The bluff's nature as a solitary outlier of the range gives it a greater range, in one place, of habitats and flora than elsewhere in the Great Western Tiers. The plants and trees found on the bluff are common to the rest of the range however, unlike the rest of the range, Quamby Bluff's summit does not show evidence of burning or grazing damage. The mountain has a mixture of habitats including eucalypt forest, rainforest and subalpine vegetation. On the mountain's southern half there are some patches of callidendrous rainforest which are dominated by myrtle (Nothofagus cunninghamii) and sassafras (Atherosperma moschatum) trees with mother shield ferns (Polystichum proliferum), and tree ferns in the gullies. There are scattered king billy pines (Athrotaxis selaginoides) on southern slopes, indicating long periods between bushfires. Other rainforest sections contain some Stringybark trees (Eucalyptus delegatensis). These forests on the mountain were formerly of mixed eucalyptus. High altitude and logging—evidenced by remaining stumps—have changed its character. Other sections contain mixed forest containing stringybark, myrtle, sassafras and dogwood (Pomaderris apetala), with a silver wattle (Acacia dealbata) understorey. Sections have some treeferns, mother shield fern, bat's wing fern (Histiopteris incisa) and kangaroo fern (Microsorum pustulatum). In other areas there is a dryer forest dominated by eucalypts. Messmate Stringybark (eucalyptus obliqua) and stringybark grow over an understorey of silver wattle, dogwood, bracken (Pteridium esculentum) and fireweed. In these sections there is evidence in the flora's pattern of repeated burnings. Eucalyptus dalrympleana and some Australian blackwood (Acacia melanoxylon) occur higher up, with a mixed understorey. The summit is exposed and wind-swept. Here there are mostly low and wind-pruned shrubs including: Narrow-Leaf Orites (Orites revolutus), Baeckea gunniana, Common Shaggy-pea (Oxylobium ellipticum, Leptospermum rupestre, Richea sprengelioides, Richea scoparia and Kerosine Bush (Ozothamnus hookeri).

There has been no formal survey of fauna though the presence of feral goats has been recorded. Pink robins and green rosellas have been seen on the mountain. In shaded and moist areas there are scrubtits and Bassian thrush. The last recorded fires in the forest reserve were 1961, when some of the drier forests burned, and 1968, when the northwest corner was lightly burned. Parts of the reserve had been selectively logged for around 100 years until 1982, mostly for sawlogs. Campaigning to fully protect the area from logging has been carried out by environmentalists, including through the use of citizen science to identify threatened species and areas of significance and then apply for their protection through the use of state regulations.

== Reserve ==
The mountain lies within a forest reserve, listed on the Australian Register of the National Estate, declared on 15 December 1982. This reserve largely covers the area above an elevation of 540 metres (1,770 ft) and covers 945 hectares (2,340 acres) of a landscape described as predominantly in its natural state. As of 1990 both Quamby bluff and the forest reserve are closed to mining exploration and prospecting. The reserve was added to the Tasmanian Wilderness World Heritage Area in 2013.

Quamby Bluff is one of the Tiers' easier peaks to ascend on foot. The walk to the summit is a popular day walk and can be easily completed in an afternoon. The most popular trail, of the four that are marked, is the fairly glade track that is accessed from Lake Highway. There are no formal car parks or facilities in the forest reserve. The walks are marked simply, with some small coloured metal triangles, cairns and track markers of coloured plastic tape. Camping is permitted and dogs are allowed on leashes. Hunting is not permitted.

== See also ==
- List of highest mountains of Tasmania

== Bibliography ==
- Breen, Shayne (1991). "Chapter 1: The Pall-i-torre, Chapter 2: Black and White: The struggle for the land". Meander Valley memories. Meander: Meander Primary School. pp. 1–18. ISBN 0-646-04684-5.
- Fish, Graham L.; Yaxley, Murray L. (1966). Behind the scenery : the geological background to Tasmanian landforms. Hobart: Tasmanian Education Department.
- Forestry Commission of Tasmania (October 1990). Quamby Bluff Forest Reserve Management Plan. ISBN 0-7246-3507-6.
- Lloyd, Sarah (July 2007). Save me : a natural history of Quamby Bluff. Birralee: Sarah Lloyd.
- Reid, A McIntosh (1924). "The Oil Shale Resources of Tasmania" (PDF). Geological Survey, Mineral Resources No. 8. 1. Department of Mines.
