= Pelion Gap =

Mountain pass in Tasmania, Australia

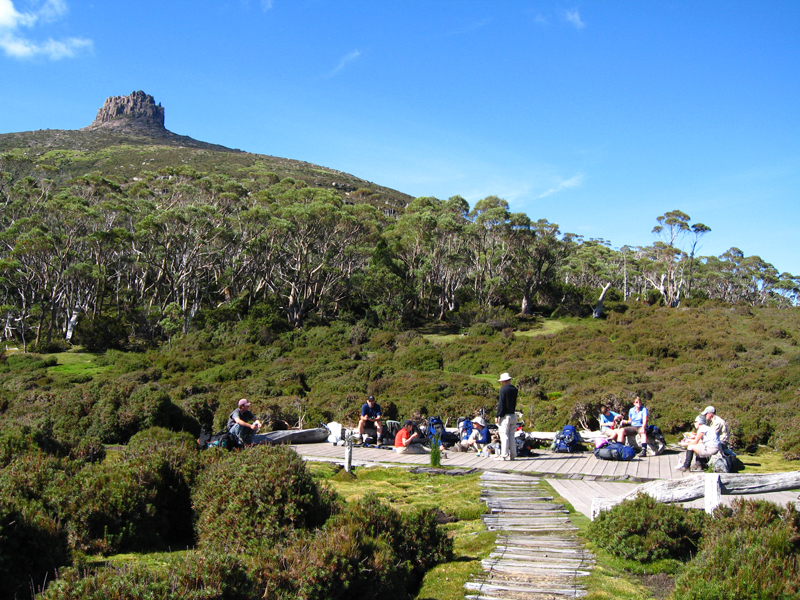
- Wooden platform at Pelion Gap
- Interactive map of Pelion Gap
- Elevation: 1,126 metres (3,694 ft) or 1,113 metres (3,652 ft)

Third Approach
- Location: Cradle Mountain-Lake St Clair National Park, Tasmania, Australia, Approximately mid-distance along the Overland Track
- Coordinates: 41°51′52.52″S 146°3′32.26″E

Pelion Gap (1,126 metres (3,694 ft) or 1,113 metres (3,652 ft)) is the mountain pass between Mount Doris and Mount Ossa to the south and Mount Pelion East to the north through which the Overland Track in Tasmania passes.

This is a popular resting place for walkers on the Overland Track as it is the highest point between Pelion Hut and Kia Ora Hut, is approximately halfway between the two and also has a large wooden platform surrounded by log seating.

Pelion Gap is also the starting point for two side-trip climbs; Mount Ossa and Mount Pelion East.

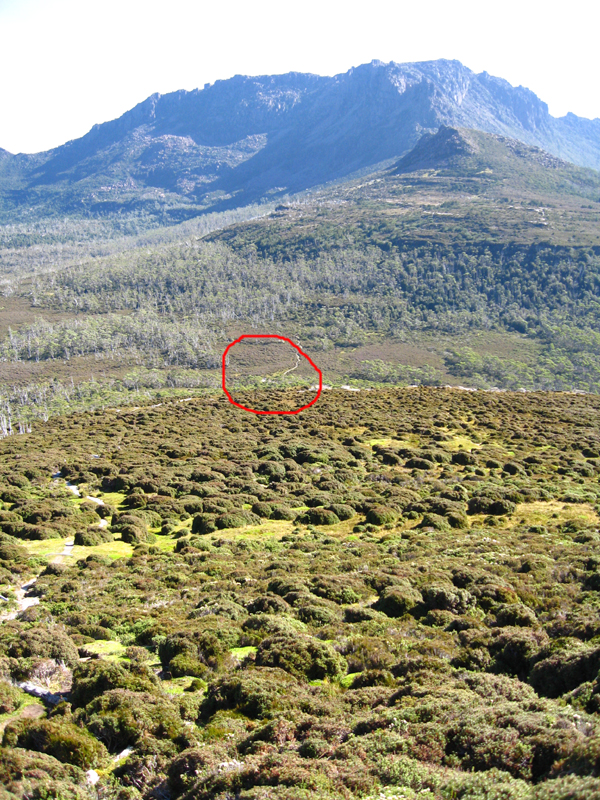
Looking down on Pelion Gap with Mount Doris in the foreground and Mount Ossa in the background

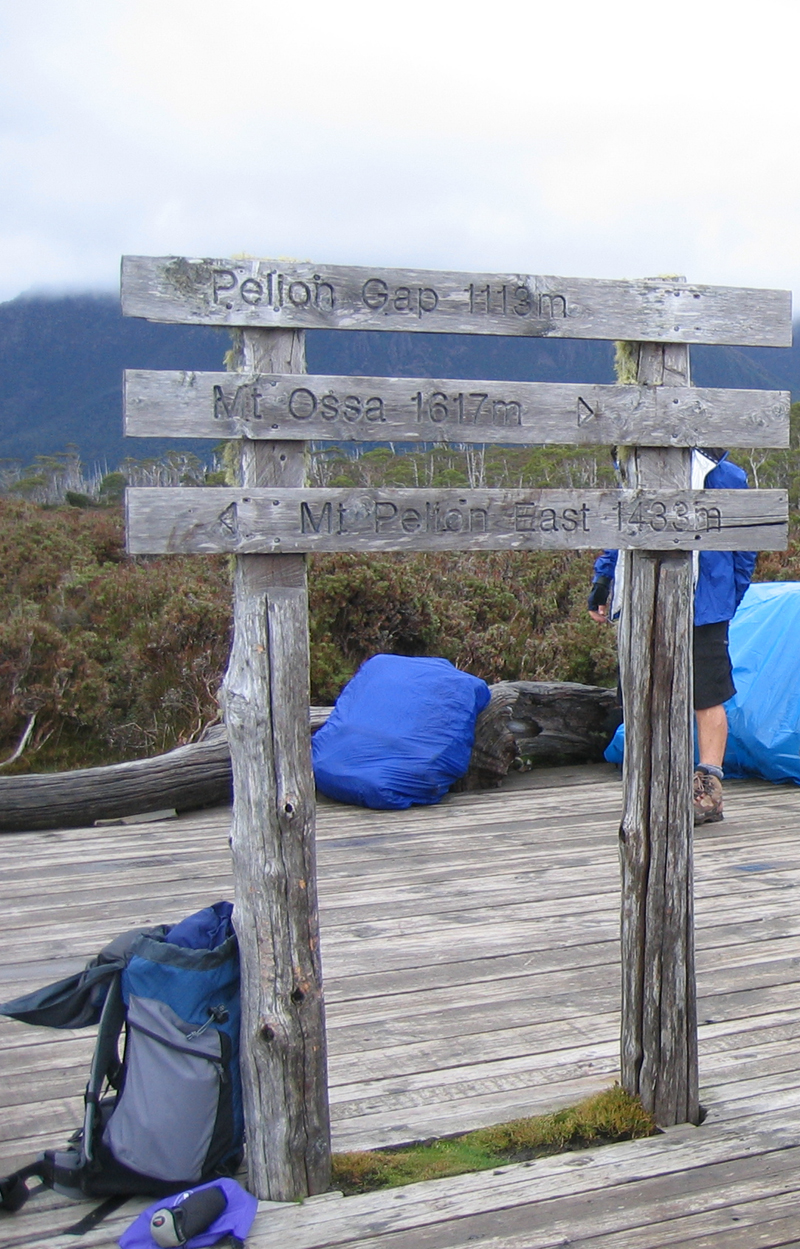
Sign at Pelion Gap

== See also ==
- Cradle Mountain-Lake St Clair National Park
- Mount Ossa
- Mount Pelion East
