= Mount Achilles (Tasmania) =

Mountain in Tasmania, Australia

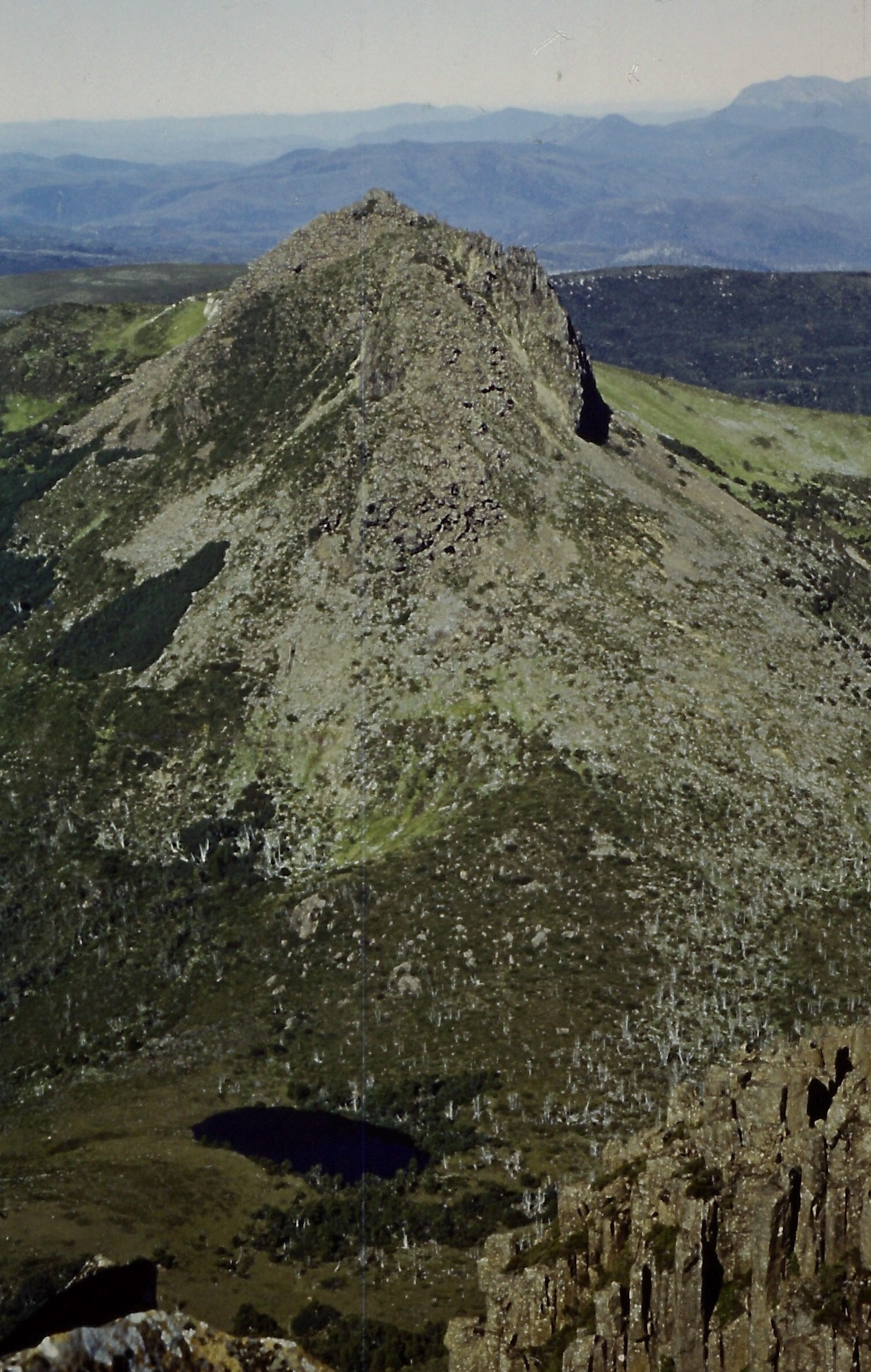

Highest point
- Elevation: 1,363 m (4,472 ft)AHD
- Prominence: 173 m (568 ft)
- Parent peak: unnamed peak 1,520 m (4,990 ft)
- Isolation: 1.31 km (1 mi)
- Listing: Highest mountains of Tasmania
- Coordinates: 41°51′30″S 145°58′40″E

Geography
- Location within Tasmania
- Location: Tasmania, Australia
- Range coordinates: 41°56′24″S 146°02′24″E
- Parent range: Du Cane Range

Geology
- Rock age: Jurassic
- Mountain type: Dolerite

Mount Achilles is a mountain that is part of the Du Cane Range, located in the Cradle Mountain-Lake St Clair National Park in Tasmania, Australia. With an elevation of 1,353 metres (4,439 ft) above sea level, the peak is the 46th highest mountain in Tasmania.

Mount Achilles consists of two main summits; the highest is known as "Achilles Heel", and the other is referred to as "Perrins Bluff". It is located in the more northern part of the park, and almost due east of Zeehan It is a major feature of the national park, and is a popular venue with bushwalkers and mountain climbers.

== See also ==
- List of mountains in Australia § Tasmania
