= Du Cane Range =

Mountain range in Tasmania, Australia

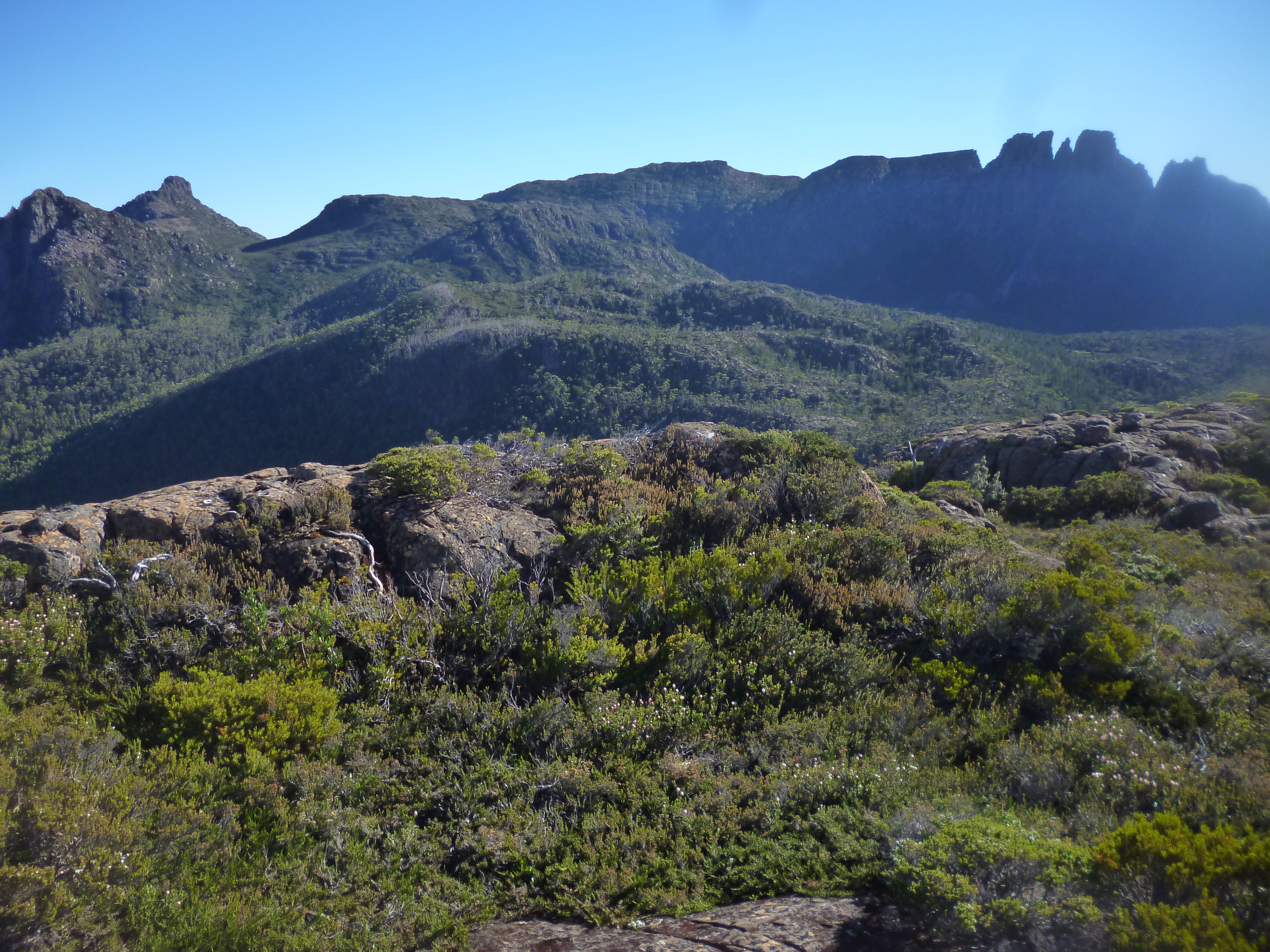
- Peaks of the Du Cane Range from the Labyrinth region, 2014

Highest point
- Peak: unnamed peak
- Elevation: 1,520 m (4,990 ft)

Geography
- Location within Tasmania
- Country: Australia
- State: Tasmania
- Range coordinates: 41°56′24″S 146°02′24″E

Geology
- Rock age: Jurassic
- Rock type: dolerite

The Du Cane Range is a mountain range in the Central Highlands region of Tasmania, Australia.

An unnamed point on the main massif of the Du Cane Range has an elevation of 1,520 metres (4,990 ft) above sea level and is the eleventh highest mountain peak in Tasmania. Major peaks in the range include The Acropolis, Mount Geryon, The Parthenon, Mount Eros, Mount Hyperion, Mount Massif, Mount Achilles, and Falling Mountain. Tasmania's highest peak at an elevation of 1,617 metres (5,305 ft) is nearby, but is not part of the Du Cane Range.

The range is a major feature of the Cradle Mountain-Lake St Clair National Park, and is a popular venue with bushwalkers and mountain climbers.

The Du Cane Range was named in honour of Sir Charles Du Cane, KCMG, the Governor of Tasmania from 1874 to 1878.

== See also ==
- List of highest mountains of Tasmania
