= Pelion Range =

Mountains in Tasmania, Australia

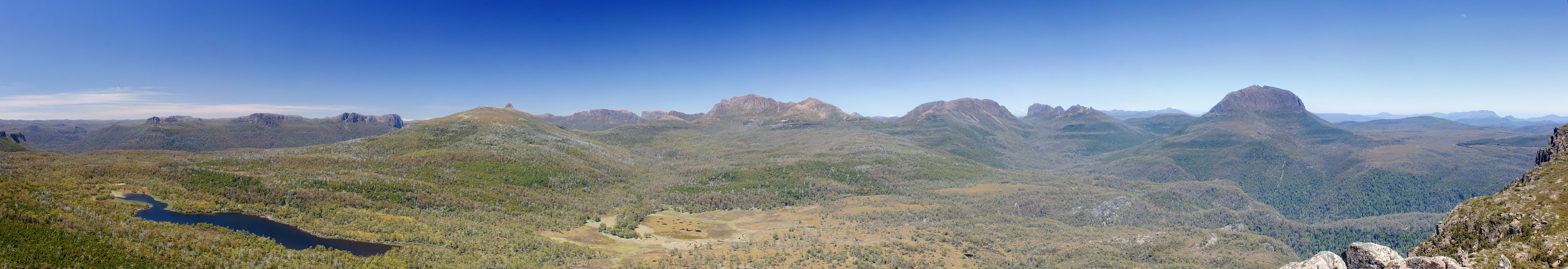
- The Pelion Range from Mount Oakleigh

Highest point
- Peak: Mount Ossa
- Elevation: 1,617 m (5,305 ft)AHD
- Coordinates: 41°52′12″S 146°01′48″E

Geography
- Location within Tasmania
- Country: Australia
- State: Tasmania
- Region: Cradle Mountain-Lake St Clair National Park
- Range coordinates: 41°50′S 146°02′E

Geology
- Rock age: Jurassic
- Rock type: Dolerite

The Pelion Range is a mountain range in the Cradle Mountain-Lake St Clair National Park, Tasmania, Australia.

The range is named after Mount Pelion in Greece. The Overland Track passes over the range through the Pelion Gap and consequently several peaks are popular walks. The range features a number of the highest mountains in Tasmania, including the state's highest peak, Mount Ossa, with an elevation of 1,617 metres (5,305 ft) above sea level.

The range is mainly composed of Jurassic Dolerite.

== See also ==
- List of highest mountains of Tasmania
