= The Acropolis (mountain) =

Mountain in Tasmania, Australia

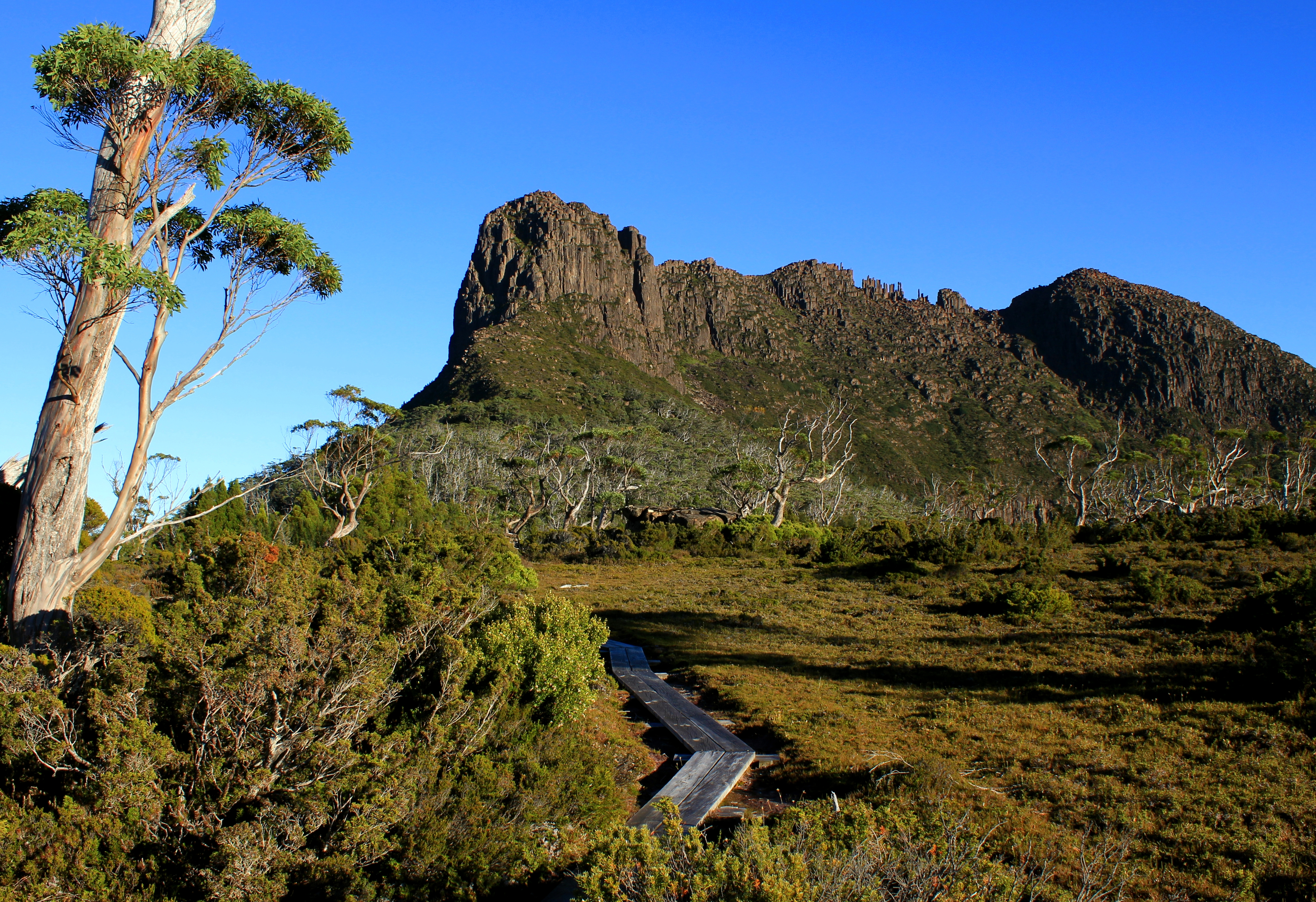
- The south face of The Acropolis

Highest point
- Elevation: 1,481 m (4,859 ft)
- Prominence: 171 m (561 ft)
- Isolation: 0.99 km (0.62 mi)
- Listing: 22nd highest mountain in Tasmania
- Coordinates: 41°55′48″S 146°03′36″E

Geography
- Location within Tasmania
- Location: Central Highlands Tasmania, Australia
- Parent range: Du Cane
- Topo map: 4235 Du Cane 1:25000

Geology
- Rock age: Jurassic
- Mountain type: Dolerite

Climbing
- Easiest route: Walk / hike via the Overland Track

The Acropolis is a mountain in the Central Highlands region of Tasmania, Australia. Situated in the Cradle Mountain-Lake St Clair National Park, the mountain is part of the Du Cane Range.

With an elevation of 1,481 metres (4,859 ft) above sea level, it is within the top twenty-five highest mountains in Tasmania. It is a major feature of the national park, and is a popular venue with bushwalkers and mountain climbers.

The word acropolis means a high city or citadel.

== See also ==
- List of highest mountains of Tasmania
