= Tasmap =

Tasmanian government mapping service

Tasmap is the main government authority in the Australian state of Tasmania for the mapping and management of land information systems for the state.

It was previously known as the Lands and Surveys Department. The branding of Tasmap commenced in 1972. The current Tasmanian government department umbrella for the Tasmap operations is the Department of Primary Industries, Parks, Water and Environment.

Map publishers have provided coverage of Tasmania over considerable time.

The range of products from the authority include:

- Cadastral/topographic maps in the 1:25000 scale
- Topographic maps in 1:250,000 and 1:100,000
- Digital mapping products

As well as a range of atlases and maps serving various purposes, it provides a series of national park maps.

== See also ==
- Geoscience Australia
