= The Abels =

Mountains in Tasmania, Australia

The Abels are a group of 158 Tasmanian mountains above 1100m and with a prominence of at least 150m.

They are listed in the books The Abels.

Climbing them all is part of the Tasmanian peakbagging movement. The Abels list was devised by Bill Wilkinson in 1994, based on the Munros in Scotland. Many of the Abels are extremely remote, requiring a lengthy hike into the South West Wilderness, including Federation Peak and Precipitous Bluff. The first person to climb all 158 peaks was in Philip Dawson in 2011, and the first woman was Maureen Martin in 2017.

List of Abels by Height
Rank	Height (m)	Name	Section
1	1617	Mt Ossa	5
2	1575	Legges Tor	2
3	1560	Mt Pelion West	5
4	1559	Barn Bluff	1
5	1545	Cradle Mtn	1
6	1528	Stacks Bluff	2
7	1520+	Du Cane Range	5
8	1514	Mt Massif	5
9	1499	King Davids Peak	4
10	1485	Mt Gould	5
11	1482	Falling Mtn	5
12	1482	Mt Thetis	5
13	1481	The Acropolis	5
14	1480	Mt Hyperion	5
15	1472	Mt Olympus	5
16	1461	Mt Pelion East	5
17	1459	Mt Jerusalem	4
18	1458	Clumner Bluff	4
19	1454	Turrana Bluff	4
20	1447	Mt Gell	6
21	1446	Frenchmans Cap	6
22	1444	Ironstone Mtn	4
23	1440	Eldon Peak	6
24	1435	Mt Field West	3
25	1431	Walled Mtn	5
26	1425	Goulds Sugarloaf	5
27	1423	Mt Anne	9
28	1420+	Mt Barrow	2
29	1420+	Mersey Crag	4
30	1420+	Perrins Bluff	5
31	1420	Western Bluff	4
32	1416	Mt Rufus	5
33	1413	Macs Mtn	5
34	1410	Mt Emmett	1
35	1406	Twin Spires	4
36	1403	Mt Hugel	5
37	1401	Sandbanks Tier	4
38	1398	Snowy South	10
39	1394	The Guardians	5
40	1394	Wild Dog Tier	4
41	1393	Rats Castle	4
42	1390	Nevada Peak	10
43	1382	Mt Manfred	5
44	1378	Mt Cuvier	5
45	1377	Rodway Range	3
46	1376	Florentine Peak	3
47	1375	Mt Byron	5
48	1369	Ragged Jack	2
49	1368	Ben Nevis	2
50	1366	High Dome	6
51	1365	Mensa Moor	2
52	1363	Mt Achilles	5
53	1363	Mt King William II	6
54	1361	Eldon Bluff	6
55	1350	Mt Rogoona	4
56	1344	Mt Weld	10
57	1340+	Black Bluff Range	1
58	1340	Drys Bluff	4
59	1339	Wylds Craig	8
60	1327	Mt Picton	10
61	1326	Mtns of Jupiter	4
62	1324	Mt King William I	6
63	1321	Eldon Crag	6
64	1300	Slatters Peak	6
65	1290+	Cheyne Range	6
66	1290+	Reeds Peak	8
67	1290	Mt Sarah Jane	9
68	1286	Mt Oakleigh	5
69	1282	Philps Peak	6
70	1281	Mt Inglis	1
71	1279	Mt Othrys	5
72	1278	Mt Murchison	7
73	1274	Mt Field East	3
74	1271	Clytemnestra	6
75	1271	Mt Wellington	3
76	1270+	Mt Pillinger	5
77	1262	Mt Lot	9
78	1261	Collins Bonnet	3
79	1261	Snowy North	10
80	1260+	Bonds Craig	8
81	1260+	Cummings Head	4
82	1259	Pyramid Mtn	6
83	1256	Mt Saddleback	2
84	1254	Hartz Peak	10
85	1254	Horizontal Hill	5
86	1250+	Pindars Peak	10
87	1248	Mt Campbell	1
88	1245	Mt Mueller	9
89	1244	Wentworth Hills	6
90	1241	Mt Ida	5
91	1238	Agamemnon	6
92	1234	Mt Roland	1
93	1228	Quamby Bluff	4
94	1225	Adamsons Peak	10
95	1225	Federation Peak	9
96	1222	Mt Hobhouse	6
97	1221	Mt Shakespeare	8
98	1220	Loddon Bluff	6
99	1213	Millers Bluff	4
100	1213	Mt Victoria	2
101	1210+	Parson and Clerk Mtn	4
102	1208	Castle Mtn	6
103	1204	The Thumbs	8
104	1203	Brewery Knob	1
105	1198	Clear Hill	8
106	1198	Mt Lord	3
107	1194	Rocky Hill	6
108	1191	Mt Geikie	7
109	1187	Mt Arthur	2
110	1184	Mt Nereus	5
111	1181	West Portal	8
112	1179	Mt Tyndall	7
113	1177	Dome Hill	6
114	1172	Camp Hill	6
115	1170+	Recondite Knob	1
116	1169	Mt Jukes	7
117	1164	Trestle Mtn	3
118	1158	Mt La Perouse	10
119	1156	Mt Kate	1
120	1152	Mt Proteus	5
121	1151	Mt Orion	9
122	1151	Mt Sirius	9
123	1148	Mt Sedgwick	7
124	1148	Mt Wedge	9
125	1146	Mt Owen	7
126	1145	Precipitous Bluff	10
127	1144	Mt Marian	3
128	1144	Mt Sorell	7
129	1143	Mt Dundas	7
130	1142	Tramontane	6
131	1140	Mt Beecroft	1
132	1140	Mt Penny West	4
133	1140	Sharlands Peak	6
134	1127	Pokana Peak	8
135	1125	Nescient Peak	4
136	1124	Conical Mtn	8
137	1123	Mt Read	7
138	1122	East Tower	2
139	1122	The Spires	8
140	1121	Mt Maurice	2
141	1120+	Mt Albert	2
142	1120	Mt Victoria Cross	10
143	1119	Mt Hayes	9
144	1119	Mt Patrick	4
145	1112	Mt Wright	8
146	1111	Mt Bobs	10
147	1111	The Chimera	6
148	1111	Stepped Hills	8
149	1110+	Mt Tor	1
150	1110+	West Tower	2
151	1110	Mt Wylly	10
152	1109	The Hippogriff	6
153	1108	The Needles	10
154	1107	Mt Aldebaran	9
155	1107	St Valentines Peak	1
156	1106	Abbotts Lookout	3
157	1106	Mt Scorpio	9
158	1100+	Marriotts Lookout	3

List of Completed Abelists
Position	Name	Date Finished	Final Abel	Notes
1	Phil Dawson	17 January 2011	Tramontane	Record: first completer
2	Paul Geeves	29 December 2012	Tramontane	Second fastest to do a round of Abels: 17 yrs 10 mths
3	Kent Lillico	18 May 2013	Nescient Peak	Aged 50 on completion. Was once youngest completer
4	Tony Woolford	22 April 2015	Mt Proteus	Record: First family man to complete
5	Andrew Davey	5 January 2016	Dome Hill	
6	Malcolm Waterston	12 January 2016	Camp Hill	Record: first person to complete all Abels and Scottish Munroes
7	John Carswell	30 March 2016	Mt Geikie	Record: longest time to complete: 54 years
8	Brian O’Byrne	9 April 2016	Mt Tor	Aged 68 on completion
9	Mark Wright	8 February 2017	The Spires	
10	Martin Doran	20 March 2017	Tramontane	
11	David Walker	5 April 2017	Mt Othrys	
12	Dale Lisson	14 April 2017	Black Bluff Range	
13	Maureen Martin	20 May 2017	Mt Bobs	Record: First woman
14	David Young	23 February 2018	Mt Proteus	
15	Zane Robnik	10 June 2018	Stacks Bluff	Records: Youngest completer; second fastest round of Abels (aged 26 yrs + 2 days on completion, which took 2 years, 197 days)
16	Shelly Napier	13 April 2019	King Davids Peak	Second female. Second fastest female to complete. (7 yrs, 5 months, 18 days). Record: Youngest female completer; second youngest completer overall. Age at completion: 36 yrs
17	Graeme Pennicott	2 March 2020	Tramontane	
18	Geoff O'Hara	11 December 2020	Mt Nereus	
19	David Griffiths	13 December 2020	Mt King William II	Record for oldest completer. Aged 76 (2021). No exact data for a record supplied
20	Terry Brain	19 March 2021	Perrins Bluff	First Supervet. 73 yrs 10 months and 6 days old on completion
21	Louise Fairfax	10 February 2022	Camp Hill	Third woman to complete. Record: First person to climb all the English Wainwrights as well as the Tasmanian Abels. 10 years to complete
22	Stuart Bowling	14 March 2022	Eldon Crag	Aged 50. 15 yrs to complete
23	Lewis Taylor	10 June 2022	Mt Wellington	Record: fastest completer. 158 days
=24	Emma-Jane Budarick	27 December 2022	Namaste Needles	Emma and William are the first couple to complete the Abels together, having done them all together. Bravo you two! (Done in 4.6 years). Emma 35, Will 37
=24	William Gregory	27 December 2022	Namaste Needles	Emma and William are the first couple to complete the Abels together, having done them all together. Bravo you two! (Done in 4.6 years). Emma 35, Will 37
26	Becca Lunnon	21 January 2023	Tramontane	Aged 36. 11 years to complete. 5th woman
27	John Whiteley	24 January 2023	Mt Hobhouse	
28	Steve Griffin	22 February 2023	Namaste Needles	
=29	Nitya Malhotra	13 March 2023	Namaste Needles	Second Couple to complete all Abels together. Nitya and Alex are the first couple to take their baby to their final summit: The Needles no less. Adi is 9 months old. He climbed Feder in utero
=29	Alex Willows	13 March 2023	Namaste Needles	Second Couple to complete all Abels together. Nitya and Alex are the first couple to take their baby to their final summit: The Needles no less. Adi is 9 months old. He climbed Feder in utero
31	Kathy Cotton	2 April 2023	Mt Barrow	
=32	Ben Wells	17 January 2024	Falling Mtn	
=32	Tracey Orr	17 January 2024	Falling Mtn	
34	Jacqui Taylor	1 April 2024	West Portal	Record: Fastest female completer 2 yrs 3 months. Third fastest overall. Age on completion: 1 day before 42nd birthday
35	Julian von Bibra	15 June 2024	Mount Kate	Aged 34
36	Nick Morgan	6 July 2024	Namaste Needles	Aged 34
=37	Gavin Brett	3 March 2025	Pyramid Mountain	First Parent/Child Completers
=37	Nelly Brett	3 March 2025	Pyramid Mountain	First Parent/Child Completers Record: Youngest completer 17 yrs
39	Simon Kendrick	27 April 2025	Mount Olympus North	Aged 68 years on completion
40	Maria Monypenny	15 January 2026	Precipitous Bluff	
41	Lucas Chamberlain	27 February 2026	Mount Oakleigh	
42	Jason Hickey	28 February 2026	The Spires	
43	Richard Gardner	9 May 2026	Quamby Bluff	

== See also ==
- List of highest mountains of Tasmania
- South West Wilderness
