= Giblin Peak =

Mountain in Tasmania, Australia

- Location within Tasmania

Highest point
- Elevation: 1,569 m (5,148 ft)
- Prominence: 9 m (30 ft)
- Isolation: 0.34 km (0.21 mi)
- Listing: 3rd highest mountain in Tasmania
- Coordinates: 41°31′48″S 147°39′00″E

Geography
- Location: Northeast Tasmania, Australia
- Parent range: Ben Lomond

The Giblin Peak is a mountain of the Ben Lomond mountain range in northeast Tasmania, Australia. It is the highest elevation on Giblin Fells, a prominent bluff south of Ben Lomond's highest elevation - Legges Tor.

With an elevation of 1,569 metres (5,148 ft) above sea level, it is the third highest mountain in Tasmania and named after William Giblin, a previous Premier of Tasmania.

Before the northern aspect of the Ben Lomond plateau was surveyed, Stacks Bluff (at the plateau's southern extremity) was thought to be the highest elevation on the Ben Lomond plateau. From 1905 to 1912 a full survey of Ben Lomond was conducted by Colonel W.V. Legge and his survey party. The survey party explored the highlands on the north of the plateau in 1907. Legge had long suspected that the north of the plateau was higher than the trigonometric station on Stacks Bluff although it is less obviously elevated from casual observation. Moreover, the area was, at the time, an area so remote and unexplored that Legge described it as 'untrodden as the distant ranges of the west coast'. Lyndhurst Giblin, a member of Legge's survey party, climbed and measured the true summit and named it after Legge and, in turn, the prominent bluff to the south of the summit was named for Giblin's father - Giblin Fells.

== See also ==
- List of highest mountains of Tasmania
