= Markham Heights =

Mountain in Tasmania, Australia

- Location within Tasmania

Highest point
- Elevation: 1,542 m (5,059 ft)AHD
- Prominence: 52 m (171 ft)
- Parent peak: Legges Tor
- Isolation: 2.13 km (1.32 mi)
- Listing: Highest mountains of Tasmania
- Coordinates: 41°31′S 147°39′E

Naming
- Etymology: Sir Albert Markham

Geography
- Location: Tasmania, Australia
- Parent range: Ben Lomond

Markham Heights is a mountain peak that forms part of the Ben Lomond Range, in the northeast of Tasmania, Australia.

Markham Heights is located 1,542 metres (5,059 ft) above sea level, and is the seventh highest peak in Tasmania.

It is named for Sir Albert Markham, an Arctic explorer.

== See also ==
- List of highest mountains of Tasmania
