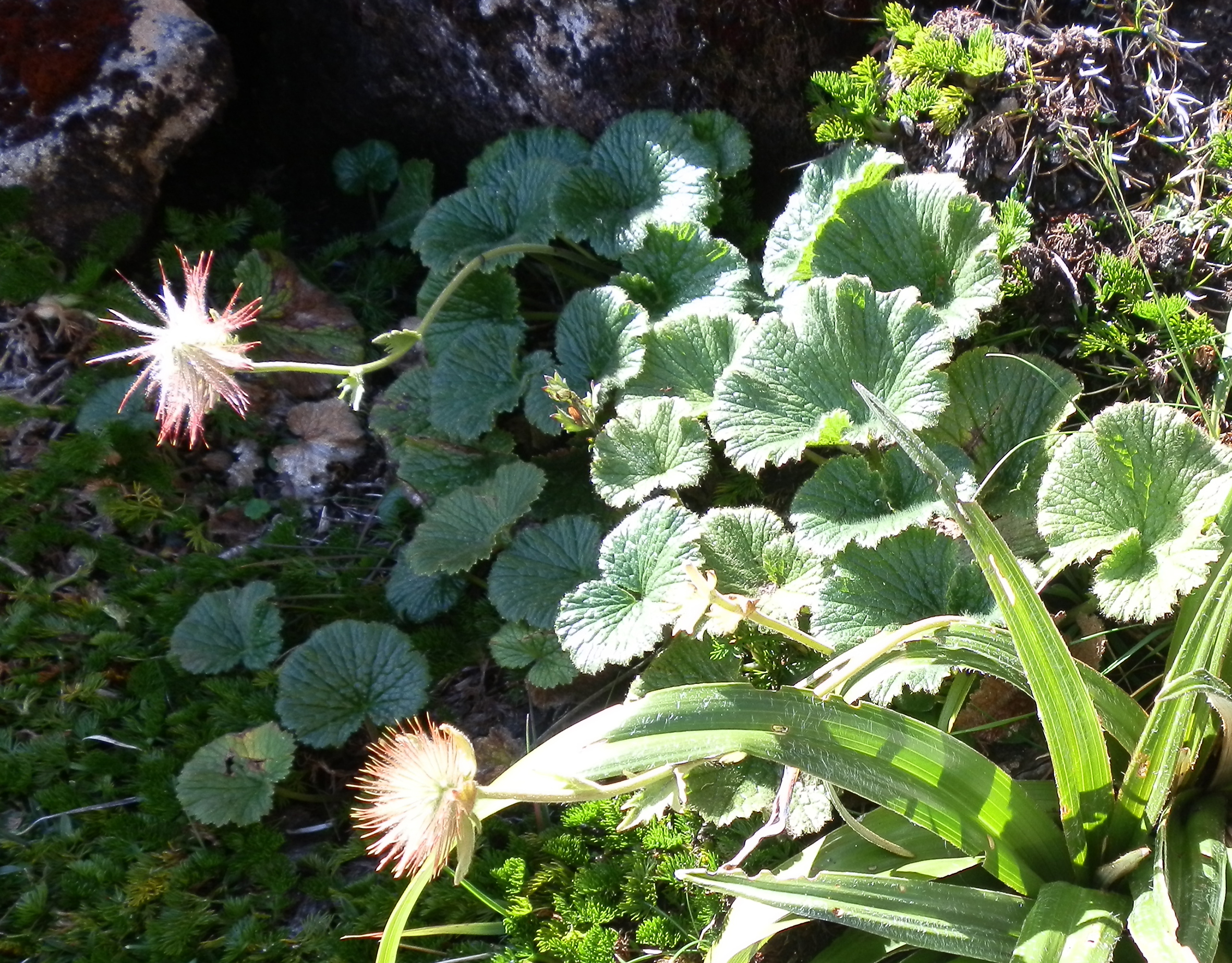

Scientific classification
- Kingdom: Plantae
- Clade: Embryophytes
- Clade: Tracheophytes
- Clade: Spermatophytes
- Clade: Angiosperms
- Clade: Eudicots
- Clade: Rosids
- Order: Rosales
- Family: Rosaceae
- Genus: Geum
- Species: G. talbotianum

Binomial name
- Geum talbotianum W.M.Curtis

= Geum talbotianum =

Species of flowering plant

Geum talbotianum, also known as the Tasmanian snowrose, is a perennial rosette herb endemic to Tasmania and confined to the high rocky places of Tasmania's Southern mountains.

== Characteristics ==
Geum talbotianum is a small conspicuous herb characterized by broad kidney shaped leaves (5–10 cm wide) which are wrinkled on the upper surface. The leaves are covered in a layer of fine hairs and protrude on stalks from the base of the plant. Flowers are large (4–5 cm across) and white, appearing on the ends of long peduncles in late December to early March. Fruits are a red, fleshy berry

== Distribution ==
Distribution of Geum talbotianum in Tasmania (As per Threatened Species Unit records, June 2003).

The distributional range of G. talbotianum is limited to high alpine areas in Southwest Tasmania. Here it can be found sheltering from the harsh weather in cracks and crevices provided by rocky outcrops. Some key locations where this species can be found are Adamsons Peak, Mt Anne, Western Arthurs, Mt La Perouse, Mt Picton and the Devils Backbone in the Hartz Mountains National Park

== Threats ==
Geum talbotianum is listed as rare under the Threatened Species Protection Act 1995. Due to its limited distribution G. talbotianum is particularly vulnerable to both anthropological and natural threats. Some of these include:

- Increased temperatures resulting from climate change reducing suitable alpine habitat and contracting the plants distributional range.
- Fire events decimating the population at a particular site.
- Trampling from outdoor recreationalists destroying individuals.
