= Lyndhurst Giblin =

Australian economist & England international rugby union player

Lyndhurst Giblin DSO MC
- Born: 29 November 1872; Hobart, Tasmania
- Died: 1 March 1951 (aged 78); Hobart, Tasmania, Australia
- Occupations: Statistician, economist
- Spouse: Eilean Mary Burton
- Parent(s): William Giblin and Emily Jean Perkins

Lyndhurst Falkiner Giblin, DSO, MC (29 November 1872 – 1 March 1951) was an Australian statistician and economist. He was an unsuccessful gold prospector, played rugby union for England, and fought in the First World War.

== Biography ==
Giblin was the son of William Giblin (former Premier of Tasmania and member of Tasmania's influential Giblin family) and Emily Jean Perkins. He was educated at The Hutchins School, in Hobart, before going to England to study at University College, London and King's College, Cambridge, graduating with Honours in mathematics in 1896. It was there that he played international rugby union three times for England over 1896-97. Among his English friends was the writer E.V. Lucas.

He travelled the world and unsuccessfully tried gold mining in northern British Columbia. He returned to Tasmania in 1906, taking up fruit growing and farming. Between 1913 and 1915 was a member of the Tasmanian House of Assembly, elected as a member for Denison, but only held the seat for three years. He joined the Australian Imperial Force in 1916 and served in France in the First World War, finishing with the rank of Major having been awarded the Distinguished Service Order and the Military Cross.

In 1918, Giblin married Eilean Mary Burton. Between 1919 and 1928 he was the Government Statistician of Tasmania. In 1929 he was made Ritchie Professor of Economics at the University of Melbourne and held that post until 1940, studying State and Federal financial relations, the concept of taxable capacity, and the measurement of tariff costs and their distribution. Giblin has been credited by some with being a precursor of Richard Kahn in the development of the concept of the multiplier.

During the Depression of 1928-32, Giblin wrote a series of press articles entitled "Letters to John Smith, the causes of the crisis", in order to explain the situation to the general public. He was appointed as a financial advisor and given the office of acting Commonwealth Statistician between 1931 and 1932 by the Commonwealth Government led by J.A. Lyons.

He was a member of the Commonwealth Grants Commission between 1922 and 1936, a director of the Commonwealth Bank between 1935 and 1942, and chairman of the Commonwealth Financial and Economic Committee from 1939 until 1946.

King's College, Cambridge, of which he had been made a Supernumerary Fellow in 1937, established in his memory a Giblin studentship, open to an Australian graduate.

Giblin was a member of Colonel W.V. Legge's survey party that explored the northern aspect of the Ben Lomond mountain range in 1907. Consequently, Giblin Peak, a mountain in northeastern Tasmania, is named in his honour of his father. The Giblin Eunson library in the University of Melbourne's Faculty of Business and Economics building is also named after Giblin.

Giblin died on 1 March 1951, aged 79. An obituary by his friend Sidney Crawford was published in several newspapers.

== Works ==
- Growth of a Central Bank (1951)
