= Cullenswood =

Historic property in Tasmania

Coordinates: 41.578769°S 148.143502°E

Cullenswood is a historic property in the Fingal Valley in North East Tasmania, near St Marys.

The historic home of the Legge family, past residents have included Colonel William Vincent Legge, who was born at the property on 2 September 1841 and died there on 25 March 1918. The sheep grazing property is currently occupied by Robert Legge, the mayor of Break O'Day Council.

The property remained in the hands of the Legge family for six generations, until its sale in 2020.

The name Cullenswood is a reference to Cullenswood House in what is today the Dublin, Ireland suburb of Ranelagh.
