= Mount Sedgwick (Tasmania) =

Mountain in Tasmania, Australia

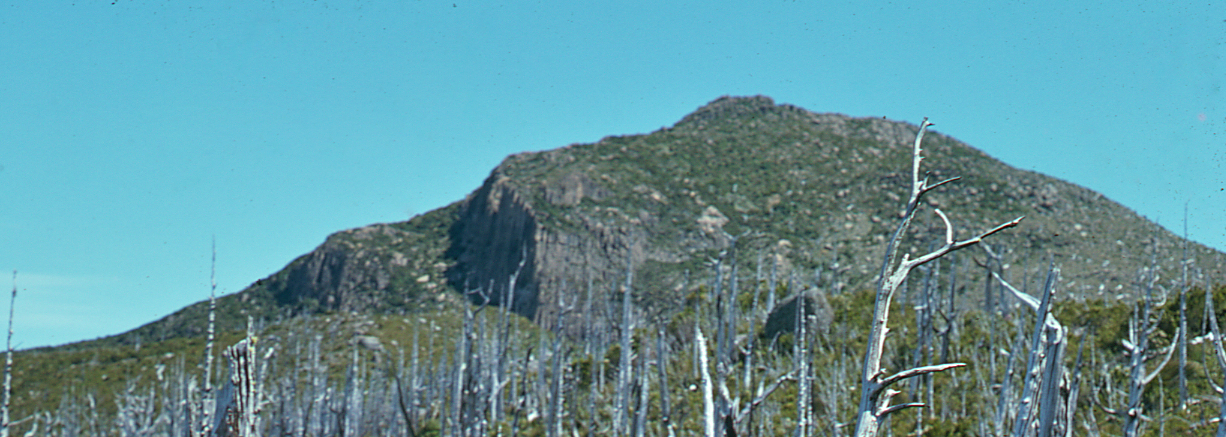
- Peak of Mount Sedgwick from the south in the 1970s

Highest point
- Elevation: 1,147 m (3,763 ft)
- Coordinates: 42°00′00″S 145°36′36″E

Geography
- Location within Tasmania
- Location: West Coast, Tasmania, Australia
- Parent range: West Coast Range

Geology
- Rock age(s): Jurassic, Permian and Palaeozoic
- Mountain type: Dolerite

Climbing
- Easiest route: from Lake Margaret Power Station

Mount Sedgwick is a mountain located within the West Coast Range, in the West Coast region of Tasmania, Australia.

It lies in line behind Mount Lyell in views from high points in Queenstown and from the roads leading out to Strahan and Zeehan. Bands of the pink and grey coloured conglomerate show strikingly on its south west slopes. Its western and south western slopes are significantly more precipitous and rocky, compared to the once heavily forested southern and south eastern slopes.

== Geology ==
The geology of Mount Sedgwick has remnant Jurassic, Permian and Palaeozoic features. The top of Mount Sedgwick is columnar jointed Jurassic Dolerite interpreted as a remnant of a dolerite sheet. The lack of a strong magnetic signature suggests it is not a plug that intrudes Permian tillite, which is exposed on the South East flank of the mountain.

Mount Sedgwick and its surrounding area was identified in the 1890s by Thomas Bather Moore as being associated with evidence of glaciation in the West Coast Range.

== Access and features ==
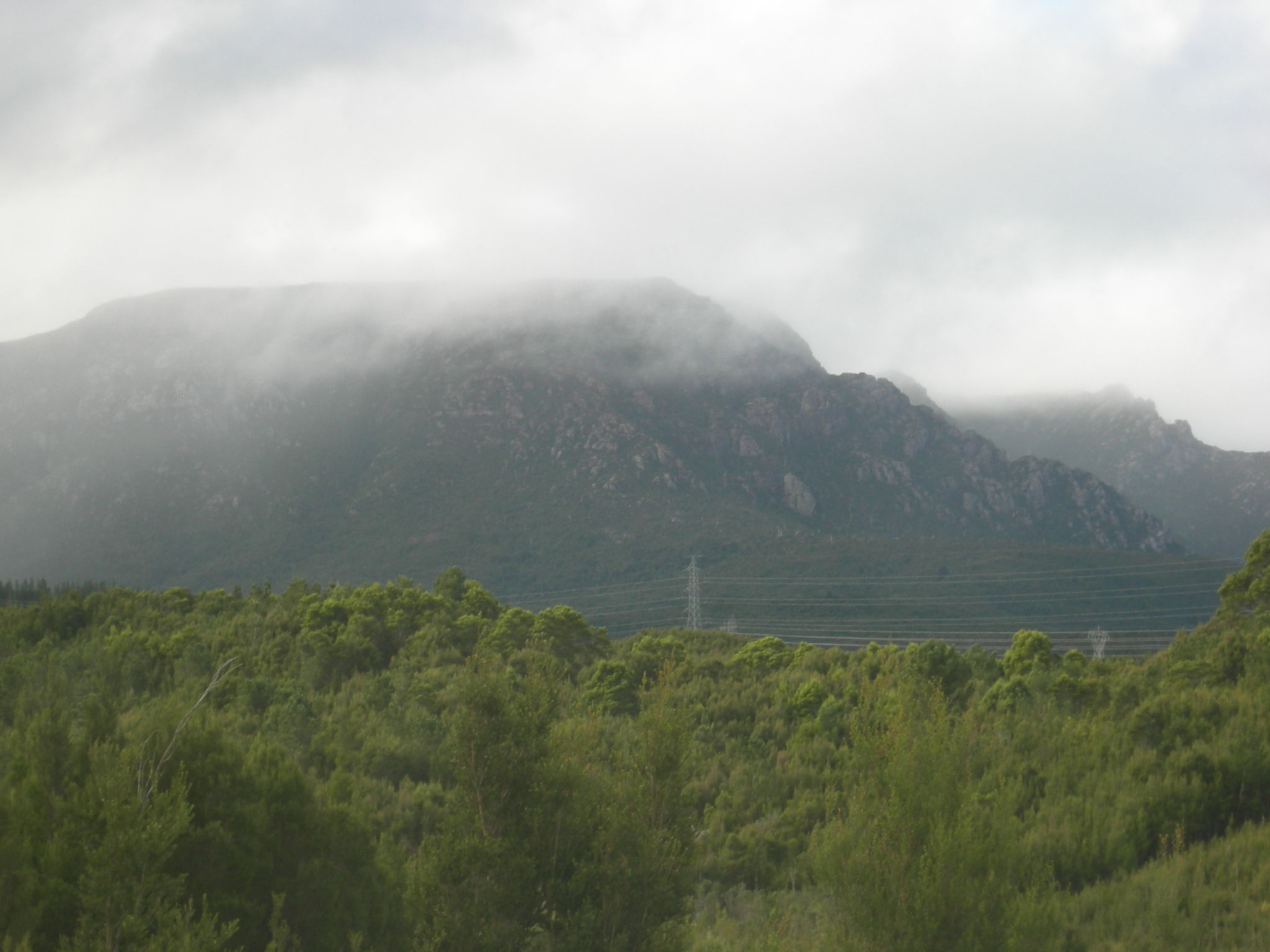
South west part of Mount Sedgwick

Lake Margaret lies at the northern side of the mountain, while Lake Beatrice and Lake Burbury at the eastern side. Mount Geikie and the Tyndall Range are the main mountains in the West Coast Range to the north. Mount Sedgwick is effectively the source of the Lake Margaret water - with smaller named lakes above Lake Margaret as feeders.

== See also ==
- List of highest mountains of Tasmania
