= Artillery Knob =

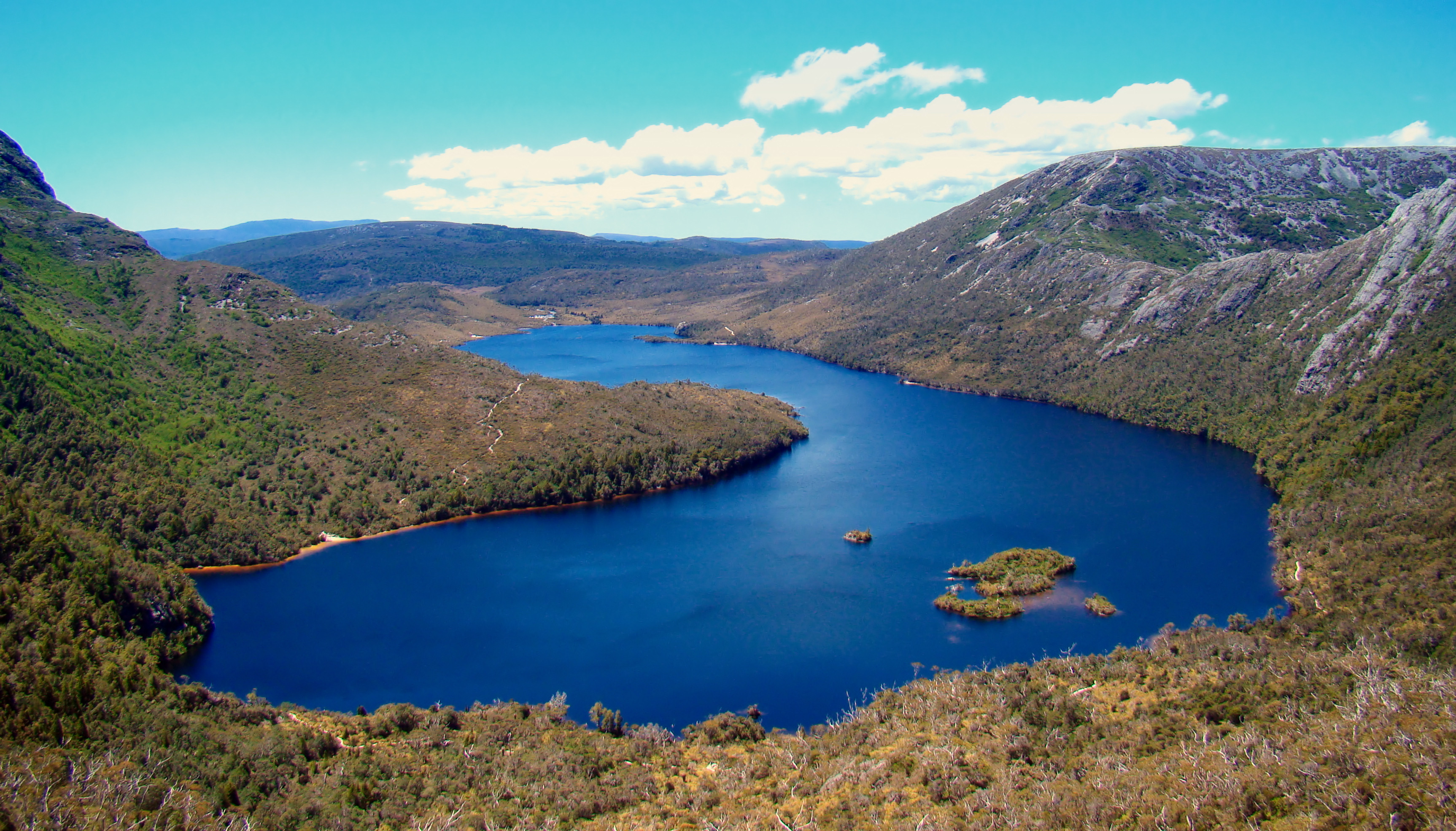
- Dove Lake seen from the trail leading up the north side of Cradle Mountain. At the other end of the lake there's a car park and a road leading to the national park entrance.

Highest point
- Elevation: 1,216 m (3,990 ft)AHD
- Coordinates: 41°40′12″S 145°58′12″E

Geography
- Location within Tasmania
- Location: Tasmania, Australia

Geology
- Rock age: Jurassic
- Mountain type: Dolerite

Artillery Knob is a mountain in the Cradle Mountain-Lake St Clair National Park in the Central Highlands region of Tasmania, Australia. It is the 57th highest mountain in Tasmania. It is a prominent feature of the national park, and is a popular venue with bushwalkers.

== See also ==
- Highest mountains of Tasmania
