= Mount Olympus (Tasmania) =

Mountain in Tasmania, Australia

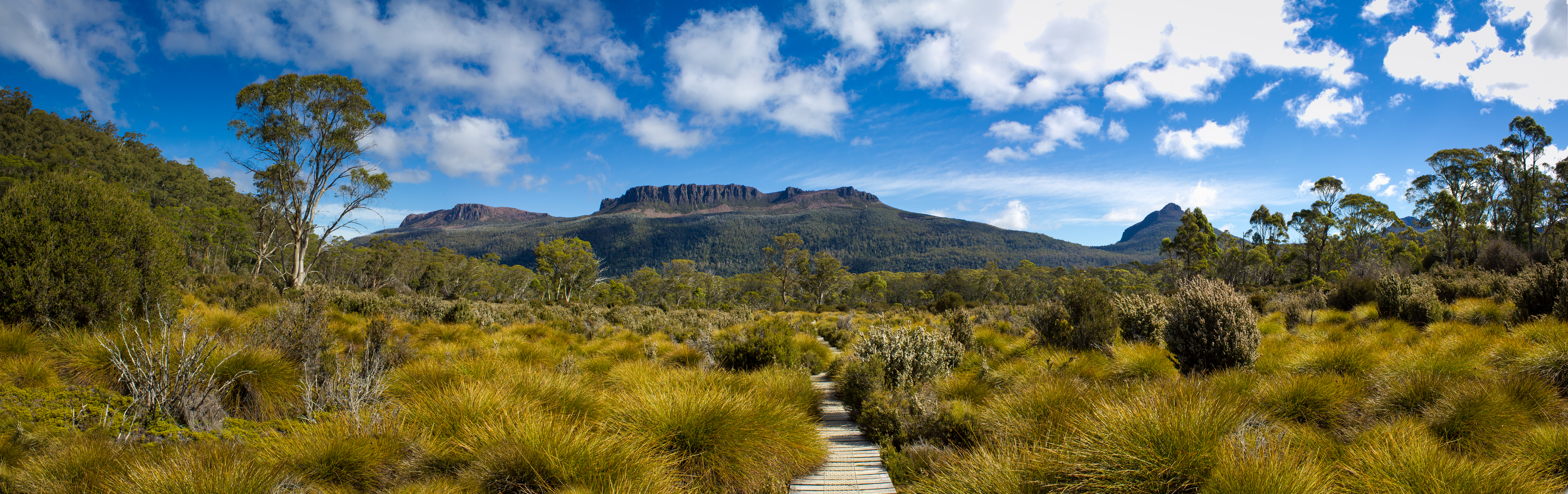

Highest point
- Elevation: 1,472 m (4,829 ft)
- Prominence: 592 m (1,942 ft)
- Isolation: 6.35 km (3.95 mi)
- Coordinates: 42°02′24″S 146°06′36″E

Geography
- Location within Tasmania
- Location: Tasmania, Australia

Mount Olympus is a mountain in the Cradle Mountain-Lake St Clair National Park in Tasmania, Australia. It is the 24th highest mountain in Tasmania at 1,472 metres (4,829 ft) above sea level and is situated about 8 kilometres (5.0 mi) South-East of Mount Gould and about 4 kilometres (2.5 mi) west of Lake St. Clair.

== History ==
In 1835 George Frankland climbed the mountain and named it Mount Olympus.

== Art ==
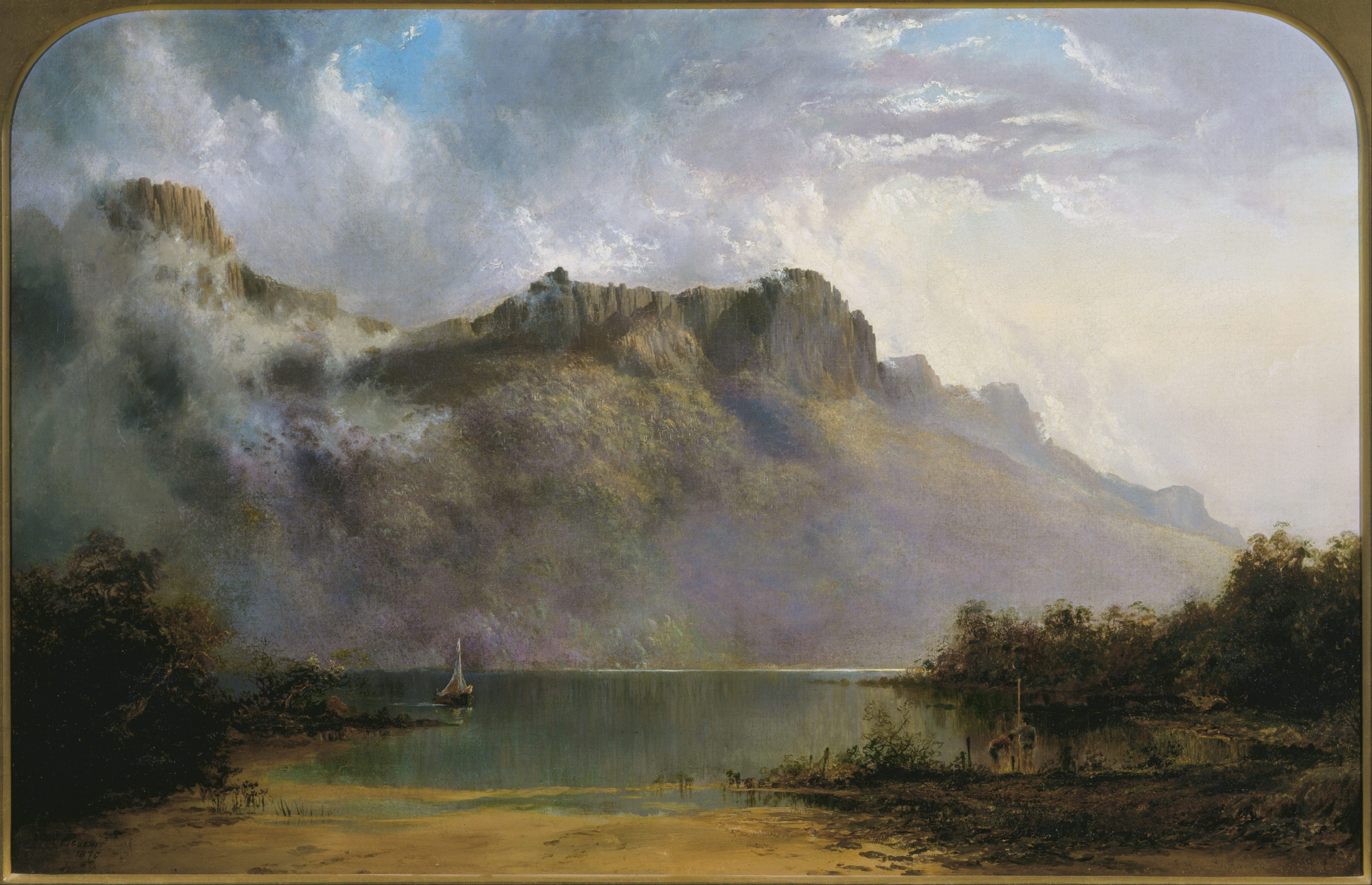
Mount Olympus, Lake St Clair, Tasmania, the source of the Derwent

Mount Olympus was painted by the Australian landscape painter, William Charles Piguenit. It was purchased by the Art Gallery of New South Wales in 1875 and was the Gallery's first oil painting acquisition, "the first Australian work purchased by public subscription", and the first work acquired by the gallery of an Australian-born artist.

Another of Piguenit's Olympus paintings is held by the National Library of Australia.

== Flora ==
Nothofagus gunnii was first collected by Ronald Campbell Gunn in 1847 from Olympus. It is "Australia's only cold climate winter-deciduous tree", is found mainly in areas above 800 metres with rainfall of more than 1800mm, and is one of the plants that indicates Gondwana.

== See also ==
- List of highest mountains of Tasmania
- List of mountains in Australia
