= Jacob's Ladder (Tasmania) =

Cruvey section of road in Tasmania

Jacob's Ladder Tasmania
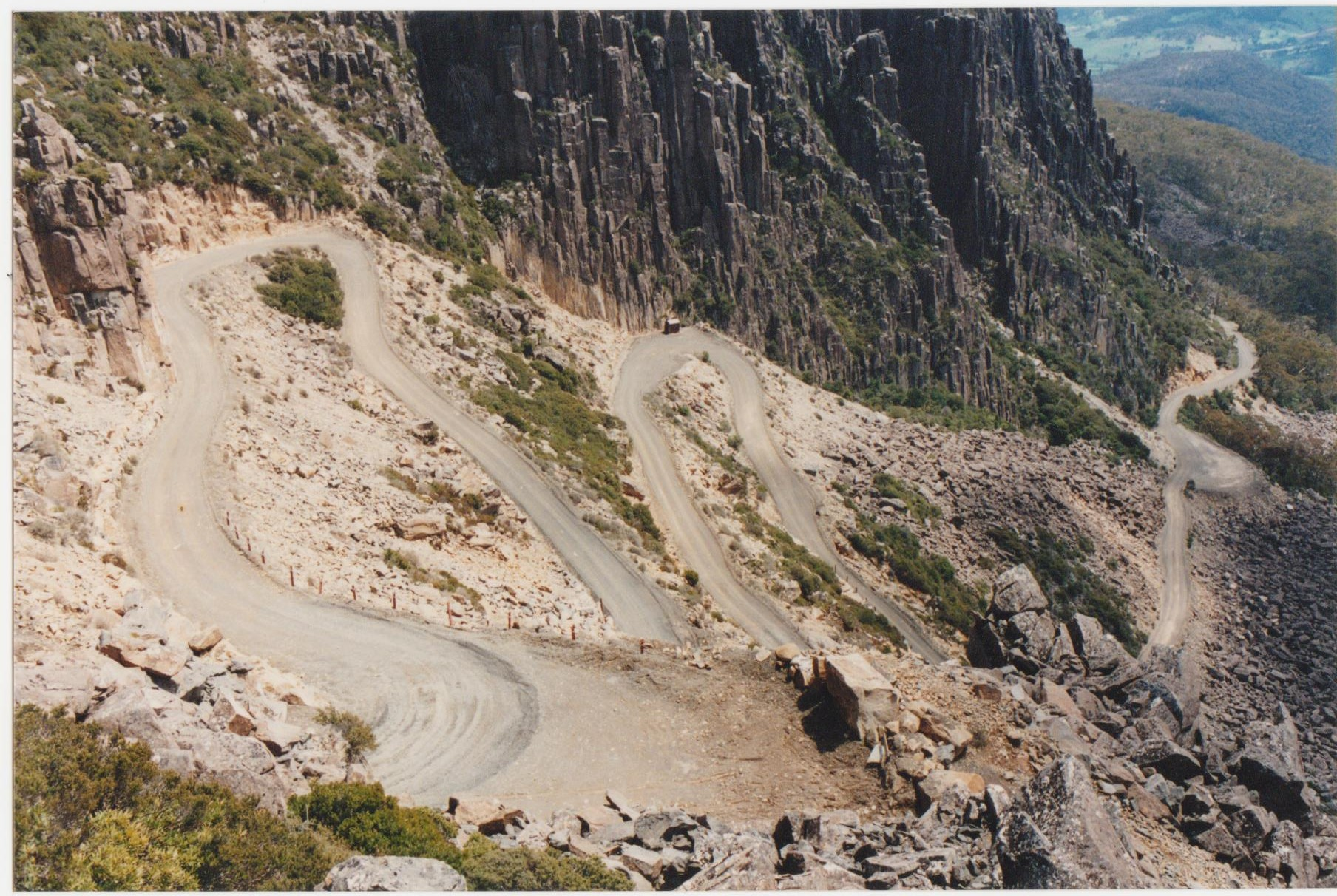
- Jacobs Ladder in 2014

General information
- Type: Rural road
- Location: Ben Lomond, Tasmania
- Length: 2 km (1.2 mi)
- Opened: 1964

Jacob's Ladder is a multi hairpin turn road located on Ben Lomond, Tasmania. Owned by the Tasmania Parks and Wildlife Service, it has became a popular tourist attraction and spot for photographers.

== History ==
Construction started in the 1960s, using bulldozers to crave out the rocks to make a gravel road up the mountain. Before the road existed, people had to go up hill which was a 1 to 2 km walk.

== Route description ==
The road has 6 hairpin turns going up hill with tiny cruvey sections.
