= Smithies Peak =

Mountain in Tasmania, Australia

- Smithies Towers
- Location within Tasmania

Highest point
- Elevation: 1,527 m (5,010 ft)
- Prominence: 17 m (56 ft)
- Isolation: 0.32 km (0.20 mi)
- Listing: 9th highest mountain in Tasmania
- Coordinates: 41°40′48″S 145°57′00″E

Geography
- Location: Central Highlands, Tasmania, Australia
- Parent range: Cradle Cirque - Bluff Cirque

Geology
- Rock age: Jurassic
- Mountain type: Dolerite

Climbing
- Normal route: Walk / hike via the Overland Track

The Smithies Peak, sometimes incorrectly called Smithies Towers, is a mountain in the Central Highlands region of Tasmania, Australia. The mountain is situated in the Cradle Mountain-Lake St Clair National Park.

At 1,527 metres (5,010 feet) above sea level, it is the ninth-highest mountain in Tasmania, and is one of the summits of Cradle Mountain. The peak is composed of dolerite columns, similar to many of the other mountains in the area and rises above the glacially formed Dove Lake (934 metres (3,064 ft)), Lake Wilks and Crater Lake.

Cradle Mountain has four named summits. In order of height they are Cradle Mountain (1,545 metres (5,069 ft)); Smithies Peak; Weindorfers Tower (1,459 metres (4,787 ft)); and Little Horn (1,355 m (4,446 ft)).

== See also ==
- Cradle Mountain-Lake St Clair National Park
- List of highest mountains of Tasmania
