= King Davids Peak =

Mountain in Tasmania, Australia

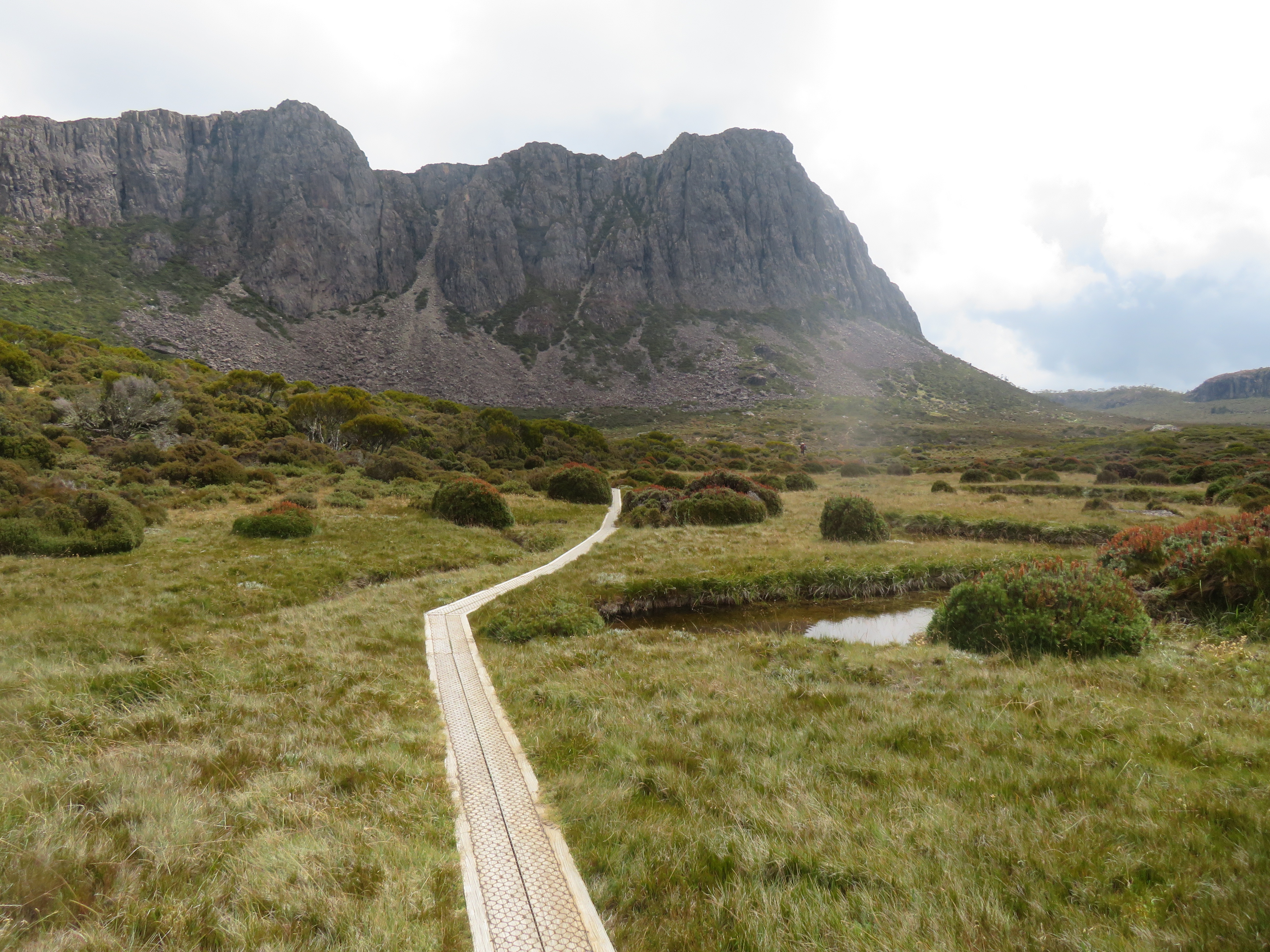
- King Davids Peak viewed from the Vale of Bethesda

Highest point
- Elevation: 1,499 m (4,918 ft)AHD
- Prominence: 449 m (1,473 ft)
- Isolation: 21.07 km (13.09 mi)
- Listing: 16th highest mountain in Tasmania
- Coordinates: 41°48′36″S 146°16′48″E

Geography
- Location within Tasmania
- Location: Central Highlands, Tasmania, Australia

Geology
- Rock age: Jurassic
- Mountain type: dolorite

King Davids Peak, also known as the West Wall, is a mountain in the Central Highlands region of Tasmania, Australia. The mountain is situated in the Walls of Jerusalem National Park.

With an elevation of 1,499 metres (4,918 ft) above sea level, it is the 16th highest mountain in Tasmania.

Like other features of the park, such as Herods Gate, Lake Salome, Solomons Jewels, Damascus Gate, the Pool of Bathesda, many features are named for places and people in the Bible. The mountain is named after the biblical ruler of Judea, King David. Its alternative name – The West Wall – is named after the West Wall in Jerusalem.

King Davids Peak is the most prominent feature of the national park, and is a popular venue with bushwalkers and mountain climbers.

== See also ==
- List of highest mountains of Tasmania
