= Legges Tor =

Mountain in Tasmania, Australia

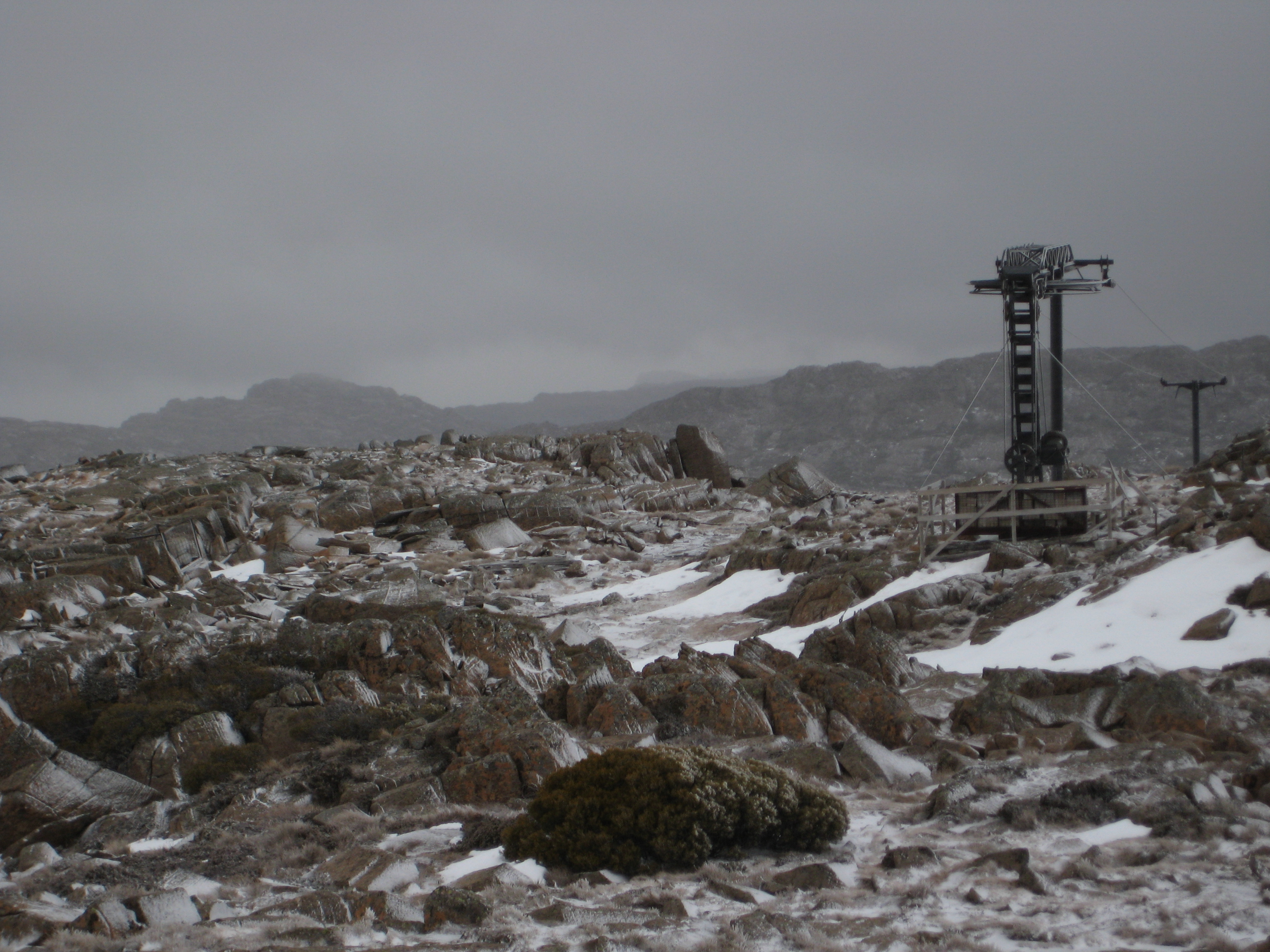
- Legges Tor from the summit looking towards the Ben Lomond Ski Resort

Highest point
- Elevation: 1,572 m (5,157 ft)
- Prominence: 1,303 m (4,275 ft)
- Isolation: 140 km (87 mi)
- Listing: 2nd highest mountain in Tasmania
- Coordinates: 41°31′48″S 147°39′00″E

Geography
- Location within Tasmania
- Location: Northeast Tasmania, Australia
- Parent range: Ben Lomond

Geology
- Rock age: Jurassic

The Legges Tor is the summit of the Ben Lomond mountain range in northeast Tasmania, Australia.

It is the second highest mountain in Tasmania and named after William Vincent Legge who explored the region. It is an unimposing feature on the plateau, being a rocky knoll behind the more spectacular cliffs of Giblin Fells, yet as the summit of the national park it is a popular destination with bushwalkers. A walking track leads to the summit from the ski village and from Carr Villa hut in the northern foothills of Ben Lomond.

Before Legges Tor was surveyed, Stacks Bluff (at the plateau's southern extremity) was thought to be the highest elevation on the Ben Lomond plateau. From 1905 to 1912 a full survey of Ben Lomond was conducted by Legge and his survey party. The survey party explored the highlands on the north of the plateau in 1907. Legge had long suspected that the north of the plateau was higher than the trigonometric station on Stacks Bluff although it is less obviously elevated from casual observation. Moreover, the area was, at the time, an area so remote and unexplored that Legge described it as 'untrodden as the distant ranges of the west coast'. Lyndhurst Giblin, a member of Legge's survey party, climbed and measured the true summit and named it after Legge and, in turn, the prominent bluff to the south of the summit was named for Giblin's father - Giblin Fells.

== See also ==
- List of highest mountains of Tasmania
