= Mount Massif =

Mountain in Tasmania, Australia

- Location within Tasmania

Highest point
- Elevation: 1,514 m (4,967 ft)
- Prominence: 204 m (669 ft)
- Isolation: 2.57 km (1.60 mi)
- Listing: 13th highest mountain in Tasmania
- Coordinates: 41°54′00″S 146°02′24″E

Geography
- Location: Central Highlands Tasmania, Australia
- Parent range: Du Cane
- Topo map: 4235 Du Cane 1:25000

Geology
- Rock age: Jurassic
- Mountain type: Dolerite

Climbing
- Easiest route: Walk / hike via the Overland Track

Mount Massif is a mountain in the Central Highlands region of Tasmania, Australia. Situated in the Cradle Mountain-Lake St Clair National Park, the mountain is part of the Du Cane Range.

With an elevation of 1,514 metres (4,967 ft) above sea level, it is the thirteenth highest mountain in Tasmania. It is a major feature of the national park, and is a popular venue with bushwalkers and mountain climbers.

== See also ==
- List of highest mountains of Tasmania
