= Mount Thetis =

Mountain in Tasmania, Australia

- Location within Tasmania

Highest point
- Elevation: 1,482 m (4,862 ft)
- Prominence: 285 m (935 ft)
- Isolation: 2.97 km (1.85 mi)
- Listing: 20th highest mountain in Tasmania
- Coordinates: 41°51′36″S 145°59′24″E

Geography
- Location: Central Highlands, Tasmania, Australia
- Parent range: Du Cane

Geology
- Rock age: Jurassic
- Mountain type: Dolerite

Mount Thetis is a mountain in the Central Highlands region of Tasmania, Australia. It is part of the Pelion Range and is situated within the Cradle Mountain-Lake St Clair National Park. It is a major feature of the national park, and is a popular venue with bushwalkers and mountain climbers.

With an elevation of 1,482 metres (4,862 ft) above sea level, Mount Thetis is the twentieth-highest mountain in Tasmania.

== See also ==
- List of highest mountains of Tasmania
