= Castle Crag (Tasmania) =

Mountain in Tasmania, Australia

- Falling Mountain
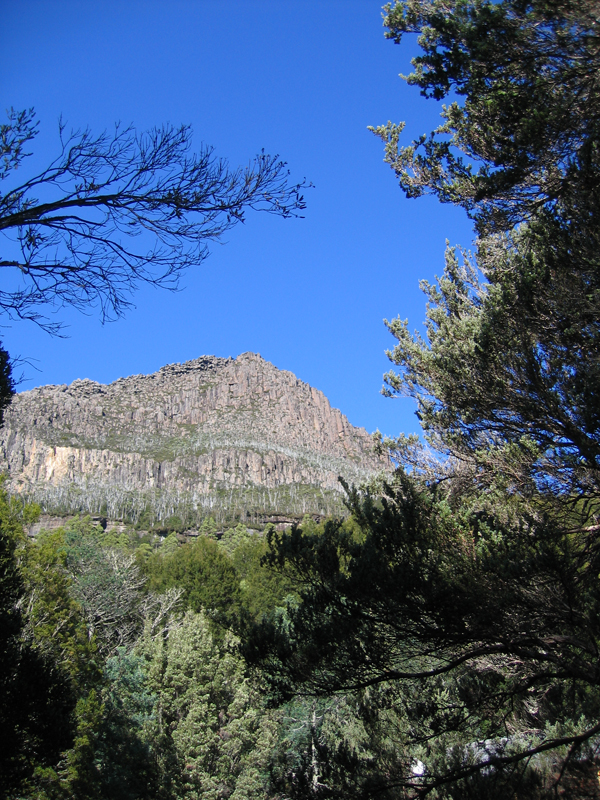

Highest point
- Elevation: 1,482 m (4,862 ft)
- Listing: 20th highest mountain in Tasmania
- Coordinates: 41°54′36″S 146°05′24″E

Geography
- Location within Tasmania
- Location: Central Highlands, Tasmania, Australia
- Parent range: Du Cane

Geology
- Rock age: Jurassic
- Mountain type: Dolerite

The Castle Crag, also known as the Falling Mountain, is a mountain in the Central Highlands region of Tasmania, Australia. The mountain is part of the Du Cane Range and is situated within the Cradle Mountain-Lake St Clair National Park. The mountain is a major feature of the national park and is a popular venue with bush walkers and mountain climbers.

With an elevation of 1,482 metres (4,862 ft) above sea level, the mountain is the twentieth highest mountain in Tasmania.

== See also ==
- List of highest mountains of Tasmania
