= Stacks Bluff =

Mountain in Tasmania, Australia

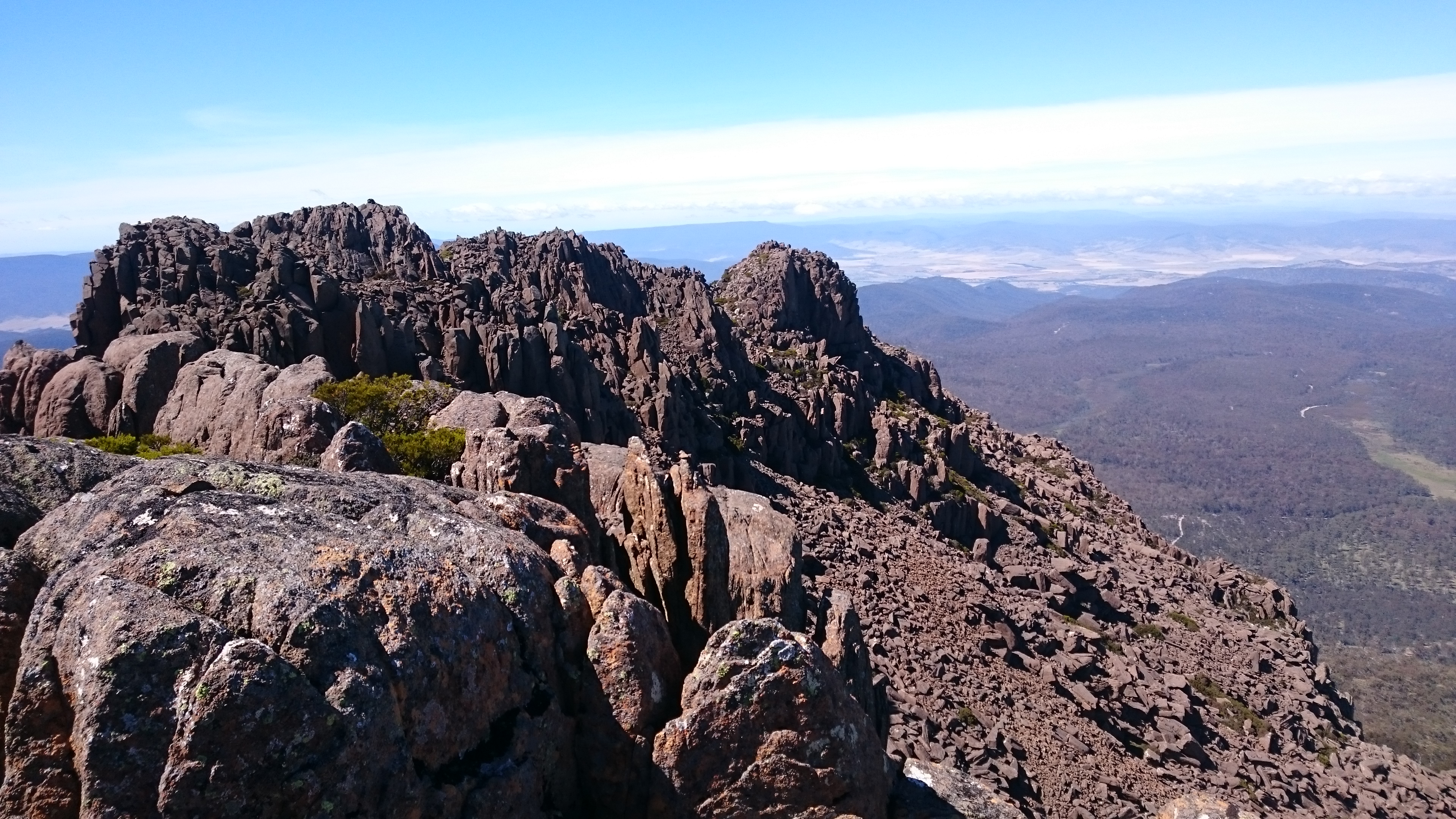
- Stacks Bluff from summit cairn

Highest point
- Elevation: 1,527 m (5,010 ft)
- Prominence: 208 m (682 ft)
- Parent peak: Legges Tor
- Isolation: 8.8 km (5.5 mi)
- Listing: 9th highest mountain in Tasmania
- Coordinates: 41°37′12″S 147°40′48″E

Geography
- Location within Tasmania
- Location: Northeast Tasmania, Australia
- Parent range: Ben Lomond

Geology
- Rock age: Jurassic
- Mountain type: Dolerite

Climbing
- First ascent: Plangermaireener (circa?); Aboriginal John Batman (1820s); European

The Stacks Bluff is a peak in northeast Tasmania, Australia. The mountain is situated on the Ben Lomond plateau.

At 1,527 metres (5,010 ft) above sea level, it is the ninth highest mountain in Tasmania, and is a feature visible throughout the Tasmanian Midlands - prominent due to its extensive promontory cliff-line and exposed dolerite columns.

== Aboriginal history of Stacks Bluff ==
The mountain was originally occupied by Aboriginal Tasmanians of the Ben Lomond nation, who inhabited the plateau in summer and left evidence of campsites and artefacts at Lake Youl (Palawa: meenemata) 2-kilometre (1.2 mi) north of the summit block of Stacks Bluff. The clans of the Ben Lomond nation who occupied this area were the Plangermaireener and Plindermairhemener, who regularly traversed the river valleys and marshes below Stacks Bluff.

The Aboriginal names for Stacks Bluff and surrounds are uncertain but modern etymological research has determined this toponymy:

- tudema tura – name recorded by John Glover for Ben Lomond southern massif – tudema 'Ben Lomond massif', tura probably translates as 'bluffs/precipitous cliffs', i.e. Ben Lomond Bluff
- tritterrer – alternate name for the peak – ter translates as 'bluff'
- loonder – contraction of name for the South Esk Valley under the peak, likely to translate as 'plains', cf. mangana lienta (South Esk River) loonder = lienta – 'the river of the Fingal Valley plains'
- troune – name for 'Ben Lomond country' – i.e. the Fingal Valley – literally 'long grass'
- meenamata – mena/miena 'lake or lagoon', referring to Lake Youl, the plateau's largest water feature, with evidence of artefact deposits
- parndokenne – name for plateau between Nile valley (Youl's Lake) and Stack's Bluff
- kullewareper – the Ben Lomond Rivulet, under Stacks Bluff

Both the ethnographic record and archaeological evidence describes their habitation and visitation of the country surrounding the peak and, in particular John Batman, in 1829, describes the "native track" up onto the plateau from the foothills and he remarked at the extensive evidence of summer occupation - with remains of firing seen about the plateau. Batman, whilst prosecuting his commission to round up the Ben Lomond clans in a "roving party", also wrote in his diary in 1830:

Made round to the stacks of the mountain (i.e. Stacks Bluff), and stopped on a spot where the women said would be the most likely the Blacks would come or pass, that it was the usual beat for them.

== Modern European history ==
John Batman was likely to have been the first European to have visited the area, as he records crossing the plateau to his farm on the Ben Lomond Rivulet in the 1820s. The artist John Glover ascended the plateau in January 1833 and sketched the northern aspect of Stacks Bluff, as well as the prominent features around the peak.

The name Ben Lomond originally pertained only to the southern part of the Ben Lomond plateau and the southern extremity of Stacks Bluff was originally named "the Butts" (cf. butte) by European colonials and then, colloquially, as "the Stacks" - on account of the rock columns (wikt:stack) on the southern aspect of the bluff. The toponym "Stacks Bluff" first appears on maps in 1915.

The "uppermost peak" of the Bluff (the first prominent isolated eminence) was hitherto known locally as Ernest Crag (or Craig), although this name no longer appears on modern maps.

In 1841 the plateau was surveyed by the Polish explorer Strzelecki who incorrectly calculated barometrically the summit of the plateau as being Stacks Bluff at 5,002 feet (1,525 m). After a further survey by James Sprent, the peak had a trigonometric survey point and an elaborate summit cairn constructed by convict workers in 1852. The trig station was "89 feet high" and constructed from timber carried up by manual labour from the valley below. The trigonometric station was called "the Stockade" by locals, on account of the palisade surrounding the central cairn, but by the turn of the 20th century it had largely disappeared.

A full survey of Ben Lomond was conducted from September 1905 to 1912 by Colonel William Vincent Legge, Stacks Bluff was found to be the second highest feature on the plateau at this time.

== Mining around the Bluff ==
Mining became established in the foothills of Stacks Bluff from the late 1800s to the 1950s. Tin and tungsten were the principal minerals to be obtained here and the townships of Rossarden and Storys Creek arose to support this commercial activity. Coal was found at Buffalo Brook, about halfway between Stacks Bluff and Avoca, whereupon the Stanhope Mine was established.

== Hiking ==
Recreational walking on and around the plateau was established from at least the mid 1830s, usually with the purpose of summiting Stacks Bluff but it was not until the 1880s, when the mines had brought large numbers into the area, that walking on the plateau became popular. At this time the principal track to the plateau lay across the Ben Lomond Marshes ascending the western side of Stacks Bluff. This track led from Avoca, up Castle Cary Rivulet to the Ben Lomond Marshes, and thence to the plateau on the western side of Stacks Bluff along the headwaters of the Ben Lomond Rivulet. The track was described as passing up the "Ploughed Fields" (the scree slope below Stacks Bluff) and then proceeding through a pass between Wilmot Bluff and the western cliff line called by locals "the Gap". Avoca, being located on the Fingal train line from Launceston, was the staging point for excursions to the mountain, with local guides arranging packhorses, camping equipment and suitable campsites below the plateau.

Excursions in the 1880s became popular enough for a landowner to build a two-storey hotel with 12 rooms, a store, bakehouse and stables at the northern end of the Ben Lomond Marshes for the use of excursionists and miners. This was the Ben Lomond Hotel, which was built in 1883, and was a popular staging point for the walk up to the plateau, but by 1908 the hotel had been abandoned and fallen into disrepair. The Ben Lomond Hotel continued to be used as a staging hut for guided excursions up to the plateau from Avoca into the 20th century.

Stacks Bluff is a major feature of the national park, and is still a popular walking destination for both bushwalkers and mountain climbers. The most popular walking track now leads from Storys Creek to the summit and the peak may also be accessed from the ski-fields across the trackless, although open, plateau.

== See also ==
- List of highest mountains of Tasmania
