= Adamsons Peak =

Mountain in Tasmania, Australia

Adamson's Peak
- Location within Tasmania

Highest point
- Elevation: 1,225 m (4,019 ft)AHD
- Prominence: 474 m (1,555 ft)
- Coordinates: 43°21′03″S 146°49′27″E

Geography
- Location: Southern Tasmania, Australia
- Parent range: Hartz Mountains

Geology
- Rock age: Jurassic
- Mountain type: Dolerite

Adamson's Peak is a mountain in the Hartz Mountains National Park in southern Tasmania, Australia. With an elevation of 1,225 metres (4,019 ft) above sea level, it is the 55th highest mountain in Tasmania. It is a prominent feature of the national park, appearing as an elegant double-peaked pyramid from the perspective of Esperance Bay, and is a popular venue with bushwalkers.

== Ecology and vegetation types ==
The hike up Adamson's Peak crosses a range of vegetation types, including dry and wet sclerophyll forest, and montane vegetation.

== See also ==
- List of highest mountains of Tasmania
