= William Vincent Legge =

Australian soldier and ornithologist

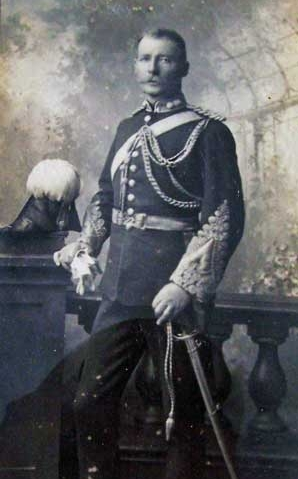
- Born: 2 September 1841; Cullenswood, Van Diemen's Land
- Died: 25 March 1918 (aged 76)
- Occupation: Military Officer
- Known for: Author of History of the Birds of Ceylon

Colonel William Vincent Legge (2 September 1841 – 25 March 1918) was an Australian soldier and an ornithologist who documented the birds of Sri Lanka. Legge's hawk-eagle is named after him as is Legge's flowerpecker and Legges Tor, the second highest peak in Tasmania.

== Biography ==
Legge was born at Cullenswood, Van Diemen's Land. His father, Robert Vincent Legge had moved from Ireland to Van Diemen's Land in 1827 along with his sisters and was married to Eliza Graves (née de Lapenotierre). He was granted 1200 acres (486 ha) which he named "Cullenswood" after his home in Ireland. William was sent to study at Bath after which he continued studies in France and Germany, picking up several languages before joining the Royal Military Academy, Woolwich. In 1862 he was commissioned into the Royal Artillery, serving first in Bath, England, and then in Melbourne for several years. From Melbourne his battery was transferred to Colombo, Ceylon, where he was stationed 1869–1877. He then took a staff appointment at Aberystwith, Cardiganshire, for five years. Subsequently, he moved back to Tasmania. He was involved in the defence of the River Derwent and setting up batteries to defend Hobart with new guns. With a recommendation from Sir Peter Scratchley he served for eleven years as Commandant of the Tasmanian Defence Forces, retiring as Lieutenant-Colonel from the Imperial service in 1883. He trained Tasmanian forces for the Second Boer War and organised in 1900, the reception for the Duke of Cornwall. He continued in service until 1904, when the forces were taken over by the Commonwealth.

Legge had early shown great interest in the defences of the River Derwent, and for this and a recommendation by he was offered the command of the forces in Tasmania. He took up his new command on 6 December 1883, retiring from the imperial service with the rank of lieutenant-colonel. In April–May Legge had completed the torpedo course on H.M.S. Vernon at Portsmouth, and with advice from Scratchley and General Hardinge Steward ordered the new breech-loading guns for the colony from the Elswick Works at Newcastle upon Tyne. During his command the forces were entirely reorganised and the batteries defending Hobart were completed and armed with several of the latest types of guns, but many of his other recommendations went unheeded. He was twice re-engaged before his appointment ended in June 1890 through government retrenchment. When Colonel A. T. Cox retired in 1898 the command was again offered to Legge. He trained Tasmanian contingents for the Boer war and was in charge of the reception of the Duke of Cornwall in 1900, and held his post until the forces were officially taken over by the Commonwealth in 1904.

== Scientific career ==
Colonel Legge had a strong interest in ornithology. He spent his free time in Sri Lanka (then Ceylon) studying the birds of the region, a work started by Edgar Leopold Layard, which led to his authorship of History of the Birds of Ceylon, comprising two quarto-sized volumes, with coloured plates by Keulemans, published in three parts between 1878 and 1880 in London. He also published short notes on the ornithology of Ceylon and later Tasmania.

Legge was elected the founding President of the RAOU in 1901 and served various offices within it, notably on the Check-list Committee, until his death. He was also a Colonial Member of the British Ornithologists' Union, an Honorary Fellow of the American Ornithologists' Union, a fellow of the Royal Geographical Society and a member of the Zoological Society of London, the Linnean Society. He was also a founder and president of the Royal Australasian Ornithologists Union and vice-president of the Royal Society of Tasmania. The highest point on the Ben Lomond plateau is named Legges Tor to honour his survey of the region.

He served on the biological consultation committee of the Australasian Association for the Advancement of Science, acting as vice-president in 1902 and president in 1904 at the conference in Dunedin. His works included contributions to the sixth report of the committee, a "List of Vernacular Names for Australian Birds" in 1898.

== Family ==
On 1 December 1867 Legge married Frances Anne Talbot, née Gray, who died in 1914. She was a widowed daughter of Major W. Gray of Avoca, Tasmania. On 3 August 1916 he married again, to Kathleen Louisa Douglas, a daughter of Hobart postmaster-general Arthur Cunningham Douglas (1840 – 5 February 1888) and sister of Vivienne Douglas, who married mine manager R. M. Murray. He died at Cullenswood on 25 March 1918 at the age of 76, survived by his wife and two sons from his first marriage.

== See also ==
- Walk to the West
