= List of highest mountains of Tasmania =

The Australian island state of Tasmania has a diverse range of geography but a prominent feature is the mountains of the island. Overall Tasmania is comparatively low-lying with the highest point at 1,617 metres (5,305 ft). Tasmania has ten peaks over the height of 1,500 metres (4,921 ft). With thirty peaks higher than 1,200 metres (3,937 ft), it is one of the most mountainous islands in the world, and Tasmania is Australia's most mountainous state.

The majority of the mountain peaks of Tasmania are located in the Western half of the state, starting at the coast in the South West and extending inland to the north, or in the Central Highlands.

Tasmania's mountains were part of an ancient range of volcanic peaks from the period of Gondwana, and are the source of a large portion of Tasmania's wealth in the form of mining. Although the eastern half of the state is generally lower and flatter, there are still sizeable peaks located there, such as kunanyi/Mt Wellington.

== Notable peaks ==
The following notable mountain peaks in Tasmania range in heights from 1,200 to 1,600 metres (3,937 to 5,249 ft) above sea level.

Rank	Name	Altitude AHD		Location	Prominence		Range	Parent	Notes
Rank	Name	m	ft	Location	m	ft	Range	Parent	Notes
1	Mount Ossa	1,617	5,305	41°52′12″S 146°01′48″E	1,617	5,305	Pelion	n/a	
2	Legges Tor	1,572	5,157	41°31′48″S 147°39′00″E	1,303	4,275	Ben Lomond	n/a	
3	Giblin Peak	1,569	5,148	41°31′48″S 147°39′00″E	9	30	Ben Lomond	Legges Tor	
4	Mount Pelion West	1,560	5,118	41°49′48″S 145°58′12″E	469	1,539	Pelion	Mount Ossa	
5	Barn Bluff	1,559	5,115	41°43′12″S 145°55′12″E	622	2,041	Cradle Cirque – Bluff Cirque		
6	Cradle Mountain	1,545	5,069	41°40′48″S 145°56′24″E	355	1,165	Cradle Cirque – Bluff Cirque		
7	Markham Heights	1,542	5,059	41°30′36″S 147°39′00″E	52	171	Ben Lomond	Legges Tor	
8	Hamilton Crags	1,538	5,046		98	322	Ben Lomond	Legges Tor	
9	Smithies Peak	1,527	5,010	41°40′48″S 145°57′00″E	17	56	Cradle Cirque – Bluff Cirque		
9	Stacks Bluff	1,527	5,010	41°37′12″S 147°40′48″E	208	682	Ben Lomond	Legges Tor	
11	Du Cane Range (unnamed peak)	1,520	4,987	41°56′24″S 146°02′24″E			Du Cane	Mount Ossa	
12	Mount Geryon North	1,516	4,974	41°55′12″S 146°03′00″E	580	1,903	Du Cane	Mount Ossa	
13	Mount Massif	1,514	4,967	41°54′00″S 146°02′24″E	204	669	Du Cane	Mount Ossa	
14	Misery Bluff	1,510	4,954				Ben Lomond	Legges Tor	
15	Mount Geryon South	1,509	4,951	41°55′12″S 146°03′00″E	39	128	Du Cane	Mount Ossa	
16	King Davids Peak	1,499	4,918	41°48′36″S 146°16′48″E	449	1,473			
17	Ossian’s Throne	1,498	4,915				Ben Lomond	Legges Tor	
17	Coalmine Crag	1,498	4,915				Ben Lomond	Legges Tor	
19	Mount Gould	1,485	4,872	41°58′12″S 146°02′24″E	355	1,165	Du Cane	Mount Ossa	
20	Castle Crag	1,482	4,862	41°54′36″S 146°05′24″E			Du Cane	Mount Ossa	
20	Mount Thetis	1,482	4,862	41°51′36″S 145°59′24″E	285	935	Du Cane	Mount Ossa	
22	The Acropolis	1,481	4,859	41°55′48″S 146°03′36″E	171	561	Du Cane	Mount Ossa	
23	Mount Hyperion	1,480	4,856	41°54′35″S 146°01′47″E	170	558	Du Cane	Mount Ossa	
24	Magnet Crag	1,464	4,803	41°32′59″S 147°37′48″E			Ben Lomond	Legges Tor	
25	Mount Pelion East	1,461	4,793	41°51′00″S 146°03′36″E	335	1,099	Pelion	Mount Ossa	
26	Mount Jerusalem	1,459	4,787	41°49′12″S 146°19′12″E	166	545			
27	Mount Olympus East-Peak (Tasmania)	1,449	4,754	42°02′43″S 146°07′05″E	109	358			
27	Clumner Bluff	1,449	4,754						
29	Mount Gell	1,447	4,747	42°09′00″S 146°01′12″E	557	1,827	Cheyne Range		
30	Solomons Throne	1,446	4,744	41°49′12″S 146°17′24″E					
30	Frenchmans Cap	1,446	4,744	42°16′12″S 145°49′12″E	966	3,169	West Coast Range		
32	Ironstone Mountain	1,444	4,738	41°42′36″S 146°28′12″E	194	636	Great Western Tiers	n/a	
33	Eldon Peak	1,440	4,724	41°58′12″S 145°43′48″E	610	2,001	Eldon Range	n/a	
34	Mount Field West	1,435	4,708	42°39′00″S 146°35′35″E	981	3,219	Rodway Range		
35	Mersey Crag	1,432	4,698	41°46′12″S 146°19′48″E	143	469	Ben Lomond	Legges Tor	
36	Walled Mountain	1,431	4,695	41°56′23″S 146°00′35″E	301	988	Du Cane	Mount Ossa	
37	Mount Anne	1,423	4,669	42°56′35″S 146°25′26″E	963	3,159			
38	Western Bluff	1,420	4,659	41°36′36″S 146°16′47″E	257	843	Great Western Tiers	Ironstone Mountain	
39	Mount Rufus	1,416	4,646	42°07′11″S 146°05′23″E	426	1,398			
40	Macs Mountain	1,413	4,636	41°55′48″S 145°58′47″E	273	896	Du Cane	Mount Ossa	
41	Mount Emmett	1,410	4,626	41°42′00″S 145°58′12″E	259	850	Cradle Cirque – Bluff Cirque		
42	Fisher Bluff	1,408	4,619	41°42′00″S 146°19′12″E	126	413	Great Western Tiers	Ironstone Mountain	
43	Mount Barrow	1,406	4,613	41°22′12″S 147°24′36″E	796	2,612			
43	Twin Spires	1,406	4,613	41°52′48″S 146°06′36″E	346	1,135			
45	Mount Hugel	1,403	4,603	42°02′59″S 146°04′48″E	253	830			
46	Mount Achilles	1,363	4,472	41°51′59″S 145°58′12″E	173	568	Ben Lomond	Legges Tor	
47	Dry's Bluff	1,340	4,396	41°43′00″S 146°48′00″E	190	623	Western Tiers		
48	Mount Ragoona	1,336	4,383	41°52′19″S 146°12′22″E					
49	Mount Mawson	1,318	4,324	42°41′23″S 146°34′28″E	51	167	Rodway Range		
50	Mount Murchison	1,275	4,183	41°48′00″S 145°36′36″E	760	2,493	West Coast Range	n/a	
51	Mount Wellington	1,269	4,163	42°53′24″S 147°13′48″E	693	2,274	Wellington	n/a	
52	Hartz Peak	1,254	4,114	43°14′24″S 146°45′35″E	838	2,749	Hartz Mountains	n/a	
52	Mother Cummings Peak	1,255	4,117	41°39′35″S 146°31′47″E			Great Western Tiers	Ironstone Mountain	
54	Mount Roland	1,234	4,049	41°27′35″S 146°15′35″E	563	1,847			
55	Quamby Bluff	1,228	4,029	41°39′00″S 146°41′24″E	498	1,634	Great Western Tiers	Ironstone Mountain	
56	Adamsons Peak	1,225	4,019	43°20′59″S 146°49′12″E	474	1,555	Hartz Mountains	Hartz Peak	
57	Federation Peak	1,224	4,016	43°16′12″S 146°27′36″E	105	344	Arthur Range		
58	Artillery Knob	1,216	3,990	41°40′11″S 145°58′12″E					
59	Mount Victoria	1,213	3,980	41°19′48″S 147°49′48″E	433	1,421	Ben Lomond		
60	Interview Pinnacle	1,200	3,937	41°13′12″S 145°02′23″E					

== Historical peaks ==
As late as the mid-1950s adequate surveying of the mountains had not been completed - with the height of 19 peaks described as about in the list in Walch's Tasmanian Almanac of the over 115 peaks mentioned The lack of sufficient surveying at that time also had the order of the top 10 peaks as:

1. Mount Ossa
2. Legges Tor
3. Barn Bluff
4. Mount Pelion West
5. Cradle Mountain
6. Stack's Bluff
7. Mount Gould
8. Mount Rufus
9. Eldon Peak
10. Mount Olympus

When Wilkinson did his 'The Abels' in 1994, items 1-9 were the same as the current list, however Mount Geryon was not in the Abels list, and Mount Gould had not been adequately given height data at that stage.

== See also ==
- Tasmap and links for indication of the mapping of these mountains
