= Mount Gould (Tasmania) =

Mountain in Tasmania, Australia

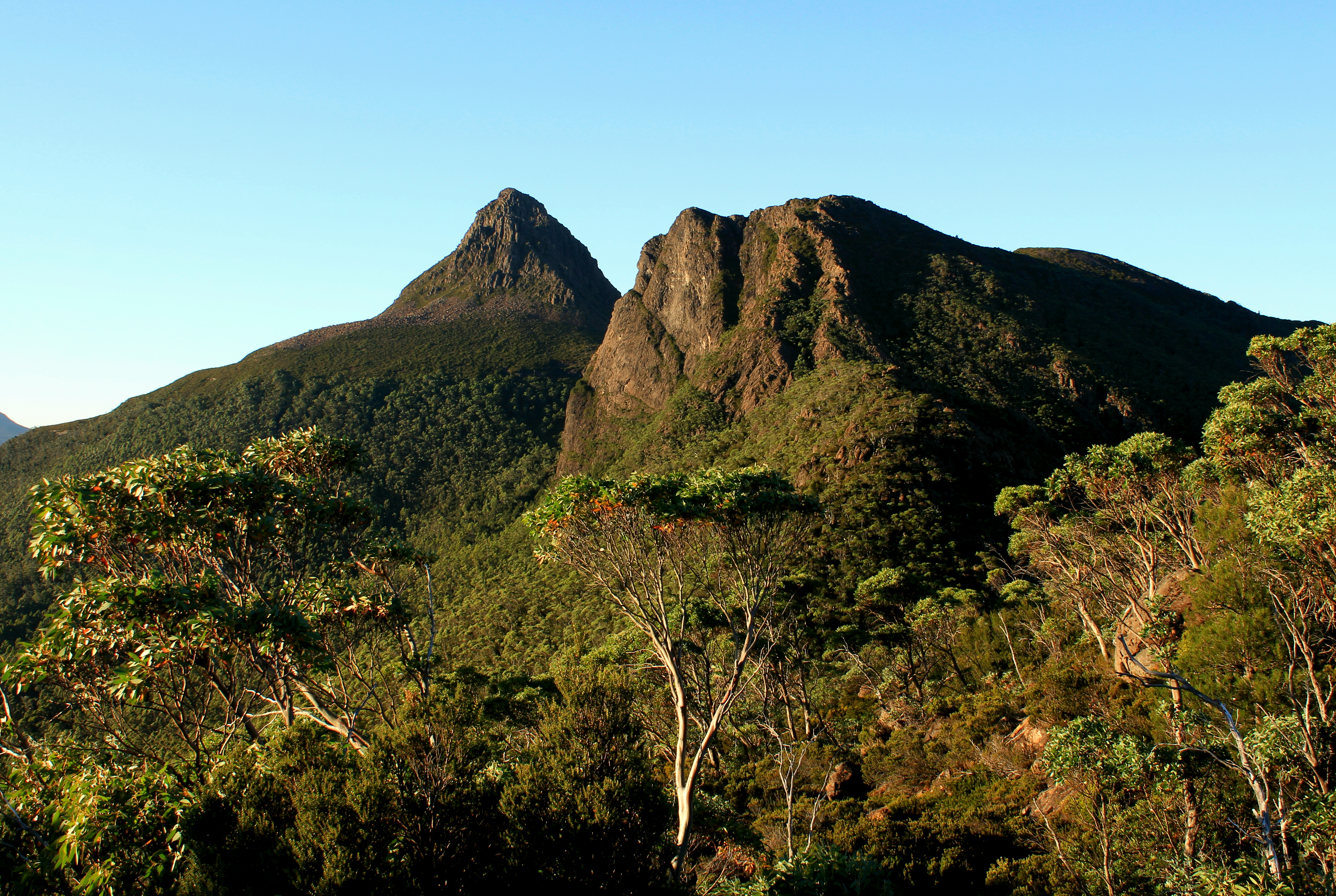
- The north faces of Mount Gould (left) and The Minotaur (right) in the early morning light

Highest point
- Elevation: 1,491 m (4,892 ft)
- Prominence: 355 m (1,165 ft)
- Isolation: 5.2 km (3.2 mi)
- Listing: 18th highest mountain in Tasmania
- Coordinates: 41°58′12″S 146°02′24″E

Geography
- Location within Tasmania
- Location: Central Highlands, Tasmania, Australia
- Parent range: Du Cane

Geology
- Rock age: Jurassic
- Mountain type: Dolomite

Mount Gould is a mountain in the Central Highlands region of Tasmania, Australia. Situated within the Cradle Mountain-Lake St Clair National Park, the mountain is a major feature of the national park, and is a popular venue with bushwalkers and mountain climbers.

With an elevation of 1,485 metres (4,872 ft) above sea level, it is the 18th highest mountain in Tasmania.

== See also ==
- List of highest mountains of Tasmania
