= Ben Lomond (Tasmania) =

Mountain in the north of Tasmania

- Palawa kani: turapina
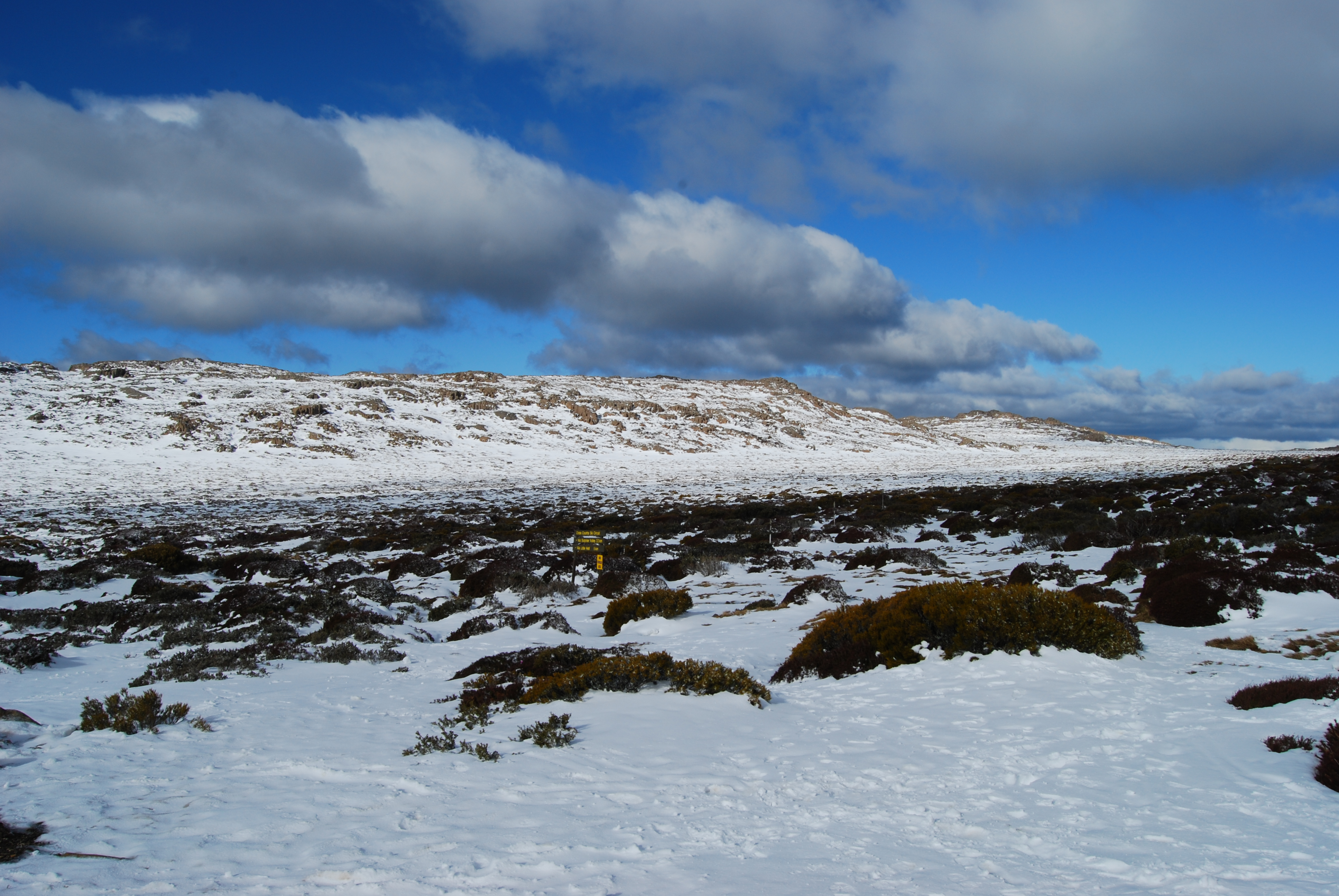
- Snowfields on Ben Lomond

Highest point
- Elevation: 1,572 m (5,157 ft)
- Parent peak: Mount Ossa
- Coordinates: 41°34′S 147°40′E

Naming
- Native name: Palawa kani: turapina

Geography
- Location within Tasmania
- Location: Tasmania, Australia

Geology
- Rock age: Jurassic
- Mountain type: Dolerite

Ben Lomond Alpine Resort
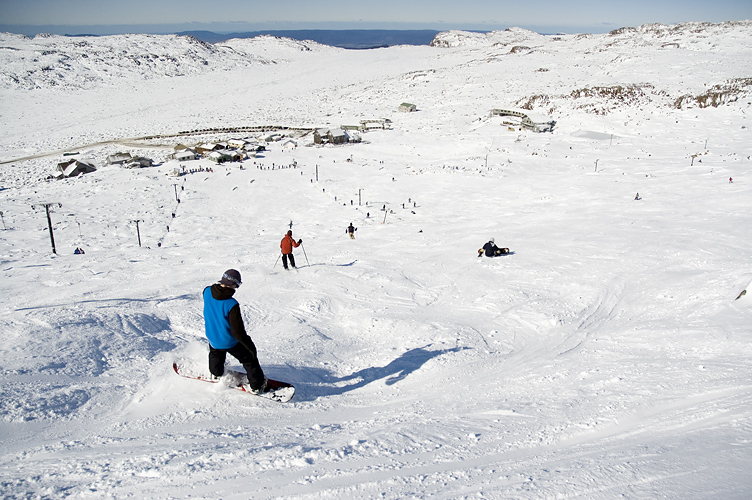
- Ben Lomond summit run
- Interactive map of Ben Lomond Alpine Resort
- Location: Ben Lomond
- Nearest city: Launceston
- Vertical: 112 metres (367 ft)
- Top elevation: 1,572 metres (5,157 ft)
- Base elevation: 1,460 metres (4,790 ft)
- Trails: 10
- Website: benlomondalpineresort.com.au

Map of Ben Lomond National Park

Ben Lomond is a mountain in the north-east of Tasmania, Australia.

The mountain is composed of a central massif with an extensive plateau above 1,200 metres (3,900 ft) and high outlier peaks projecting from the mountain. The highest feature on the plateau is the unimposing summit of Legges Tor, at 1,572 m, on the northern aspect of the plateau. The southern end of the plateau is dominated by Stacks Bluff, 1,527 metres (5,010 ft), which is an imposing feature that drops away to a cliffline 600 metres (2,000 ft) above the surrounding foothills. The prominent outlier peaks of Ragged Jack (1,369 metres (4,491 ft)), Mensa Moor (1,358 metres (4,455 ft)) and Tower Hill (1,122 metres (3,681 ft)) surround the plateau.

Ben Lomond is east of Launceston in the Ben Lomond National Park. Tasmania's premier Alpine skiing operations are located at Ben Lomond with downhill skiing facilities in the State.

Its accessibility from Launceston, together with the existence of a ski village on the plateau make Ben Lomond an all year round favourite for tourists and hikers. Access to the village and summit can be made via several walking tracks or via a zig-zag road known as "Jacobs Ladder".

The locality of Ben Lomond is in the local government area of Northern Midlands in the Central region of Tasmania. The locality is about 64 kilometres (40 mi) east of the town of Longford.

== Nomenclature ==
The Tasmanian Aboriginal palawa kani name for Ben Lomond is turapina and was recorded in various word lists as turbunna, toorbunna or toorerpunner. The meaning of this name is uncertain, but the suffix bunna/pina is thought to denote tableland or plateau and linguistic research suggests that the stem tur/tura means bluff or precipitous cliffs. Modern etymological researchers of the Palawa lexicon assert that, in addition to turupina, there were several names related to Ben Lomond:

- parndokenne - the plateau between the Nile River valley (Lake Youl) and Stacks Bluff
- tudema tura - a name recorded by John Glover - Taylor asserts that tudema equates to the locality and tura = bluff- probably Stacks Bluff
- loonder - cf lienta (i.e. mangana lienta - South Esk River) a contraction for the plains to the south of Stacks Bluff - Fingal Valley
- tritterer - another name for a bluff at Ben Lomond (cf ter=tur bluff/cliffs)

Most of the Aboriginal names for Ben Lomond probably refer to Stacks Bluff or the southern division of the massif - as the toponym Ben Lomond was usually applied to the southern half of the mountain in 1800s Tasmania, when these words were recorded. The lake on the southern aspect of the plateau, now known as Lake Youl, was known to the Aboriginal people as minamata, the prefix mena/miena being the aboriginal word for lake or lagoon and the suffix mata possibly referring to the surrounding topography. This name survives on modern maps as the toponym for the small lakes on the north-western aspect of the plateau - the Menamatta Tarns. One of the few examples in Tasmania of a land feature retaining its traditional name.

The South Esk River, which encircles the plateau on three sides, was known as mangana lienta, from the word mananyer (large stream) and lienta referring to loonder, that is, the Fingal valley. The river near modern day Nile was known as plipatumila

Although the mountain was seen by Flinders on his circumnavigation of Tasmania, the modern name was given by Colonel Paterson, who founded the first settlement in northern Tasmania in 1804, and is taken from the eponymous Scottish mountain. There is no isolated peak named Ben Lomond but instead the name may refer to the plateau, massif, bioregion or national park in which it is situated. In colonial times 'Ben Lomond' referred to both the southern extremity of the massif and the country around the southern escarpment. The toponym does not appear cartographically in reference to the entire massif until the 1900s; when Stacks Bluff also appeared on modern maps. Features on the plateau have accreted names over the last two centuries as the region has opened up to surveyors and official parties.

The prominent peaks were renamed promptly by European settlers and most were based on appearance or location, with Stacks Bluff (originally 'the Butts', then 'the Stacks'), Ossians Throne (originally 'The Knuckle'), the Buffaloes (rock formations near Denison Crag) and Ragged Jack (originally Ragged Mountain) appearing in correspondence in the 1800s. Features on the plateau were predominantly named after surveyors (Giblin Fells), Government Administrators (Twelvetrees Moor), local identities Lake Youl (John Youl (clergyman)) or contemporary explorers (Grant Cirque). The Government Surveyor John Helder Wedge made several visits to the plateau and renamed minamata 'Lake Glover' - after John Glover - and named modern day Tranquil Tarn as 'Pigeon's Well'; - after "Pigeon (Beewurher)" - John Batman's mainland Aboriginal guide; all of whom accompanied Wedge on his first expedition to the plateau. Wedge also records an unknown feature (possibly Lake Baker, the next largest water feature on the plateau) as 'Lake Maikai' - the provenance of this name is unknown.

Last to be named is Mensa Moor, which was approved by the state Nomenclature Board in the 1990s.

== Natural history of the mountain ==
=== Geology ===
The basement rocks comprise slates, siltstones, greywackes and quartzite. These were intruded by granite and, later, by dolerite during the Jurassic Period. Dolerite predominates on the plateau. The only exception is a highly localised area under Coalmine Crag and around the flanks of the Ben Lomond Plateau. This exposure includes a narrow coal sequence, which was once worked commercially. During the Pleistocene Ice Age, a small ice-cap existed on Ben Lomond, which was the only plateau in the north-east to be glaciated. The effects of these glaciers account for much of the contrast between the alpine scenery of Ben Lomond and that of the other mountains in the north-east. The most notable relict periglacial depositional features are the blockfields, which cover over a quarter of the Ben Lomond plateau. Much of the plateau is devoid of soils. Organic soils (peats), including deep peats, are most extensively developed on the western side of Rodway Valley. Mineral soils are also found, particularly in the better drained sites.

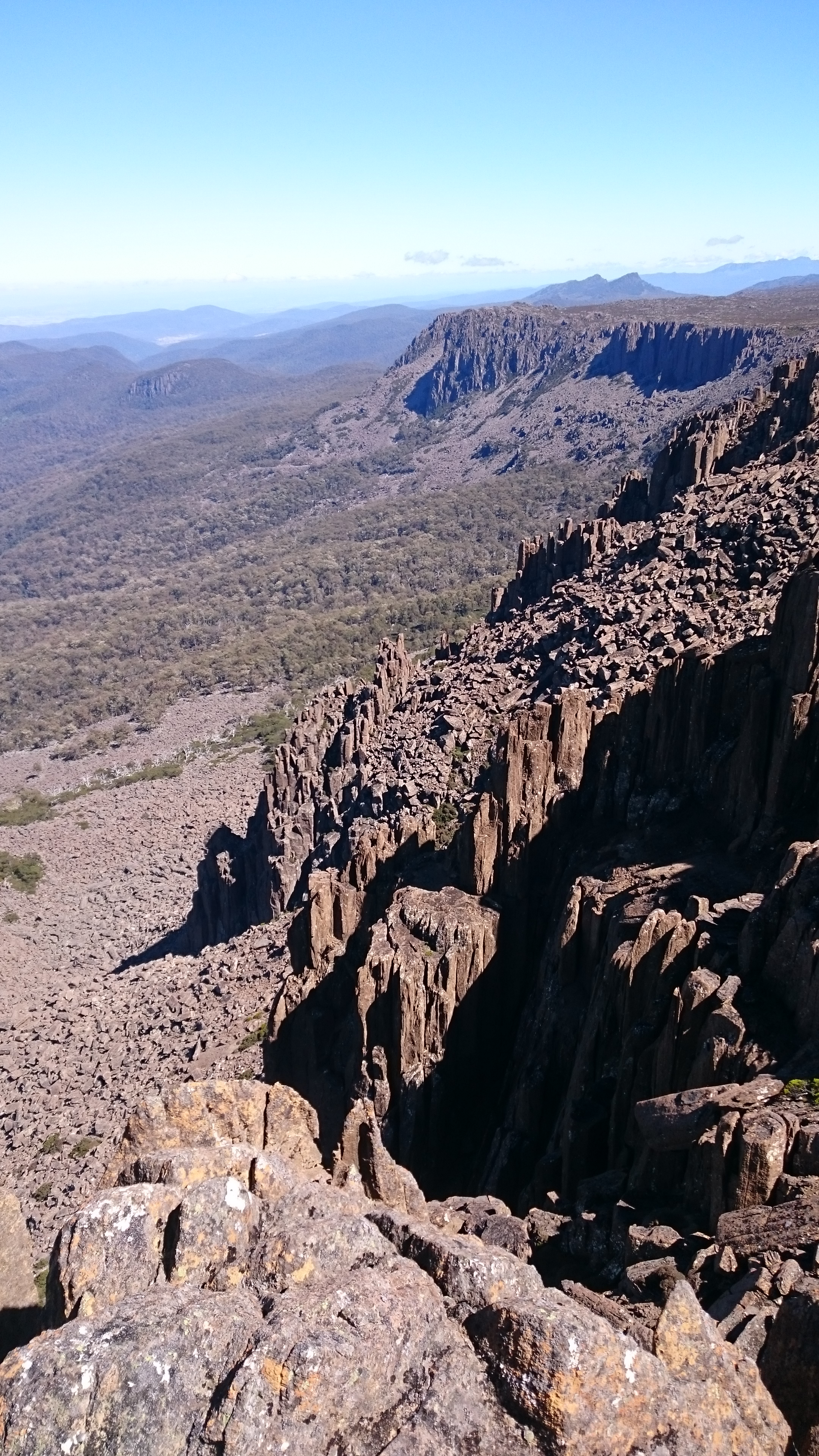
Jurassic dolerite on western escarpment

=== Flora ===
Ben Lomond National Park protects a representative cross-section of Tasmania's north-east alpine plant communities. Although much of the plateau is stony with areas of low and often stunted forms of vegetation, the remainder of the mountain contains a wide variety of habitats ranging from alpine moorland to dense forest. A total of 222 plant species have been recorded on the Ben Lomond plateau, represented by 152 dicotyledons, 62 monocotyledons, 1 gymnosperm and 7 fern and fern ally families. The five most common families (Asteraceae, Poaceae, Epacridaceae, Cyperaceae and Proteaceae) account for about half the total number of species recorded. Most families, however, are only represented by one or two species. Some introduced plants have naturalised on the plateau from introduced grasses, clovers and straw used to stabilise soil and revegetate areas affected by slope grooming, road works and other site disturbances. The most common native species recorded on the plateau are the herbs (Poa gunnii (tussock grass) and Gentianella diemensis), and the shrubs (Richea scoparia, Orites acicularis and Pentachondra pumila, Baeckea gunniana and Epacris serpyllifolia). Cushion plants are abundant throughout the plateau. One species, the rock cushion plant Chionohebe ciliolata, is known only from a small localised area within the park. Other rare and threatened species include the rare endemic Oreomyrrhis sessiliflora, and the endangered Colobanthus curtisiae.

=== Fauna ===
Of the larger mammals, Bennett's wallabies and wombats are common, and are regularly seen in the ski village during summer and winter, even under blizzard conditions. Pademelons are abundant in the wet gullies and areas with thick undergrowth. Forester kangaroos have been recorded along the south-west edge of the park. Eastern quolls inhabit the ski village during winter, and are sometimes sighted during daylight hours. Dusky antechinus occasionally visit lodges. The echidna has been recorded and the platypus has been sighted in the Upper Ford River. Various other species, including the long-nosed potoroo, Tasmanian bettong, brushtail possum, ringtail possum, sugar glider, native rodents such as the velvet-furred rat and the long-tailed mouse, and six species of bat have all been recorded in the park. Among the birds, no systematic study has been made. Wedge-tailed eagles are regularly reported, as is the noisy yellow-tailed black cockatoo. Among the endemic species recorded are the green rosella, scrubtit, brown thornbill, yellow wattlebird, yellow-throated honeyeater, black-headed honeyeater, strong-billed honeyeater and the black currawong. Little is known of the reptiles from Ben Lomond. Of particular interest is the endemic northern snow skink Niveoscincus greeni which is an alpine species restricted to several other mountain top areas in the State. Amphibians recorded from Ben Lomond include the brown tree frog, common eastern froglet and the endemic Tasmanian froglet.

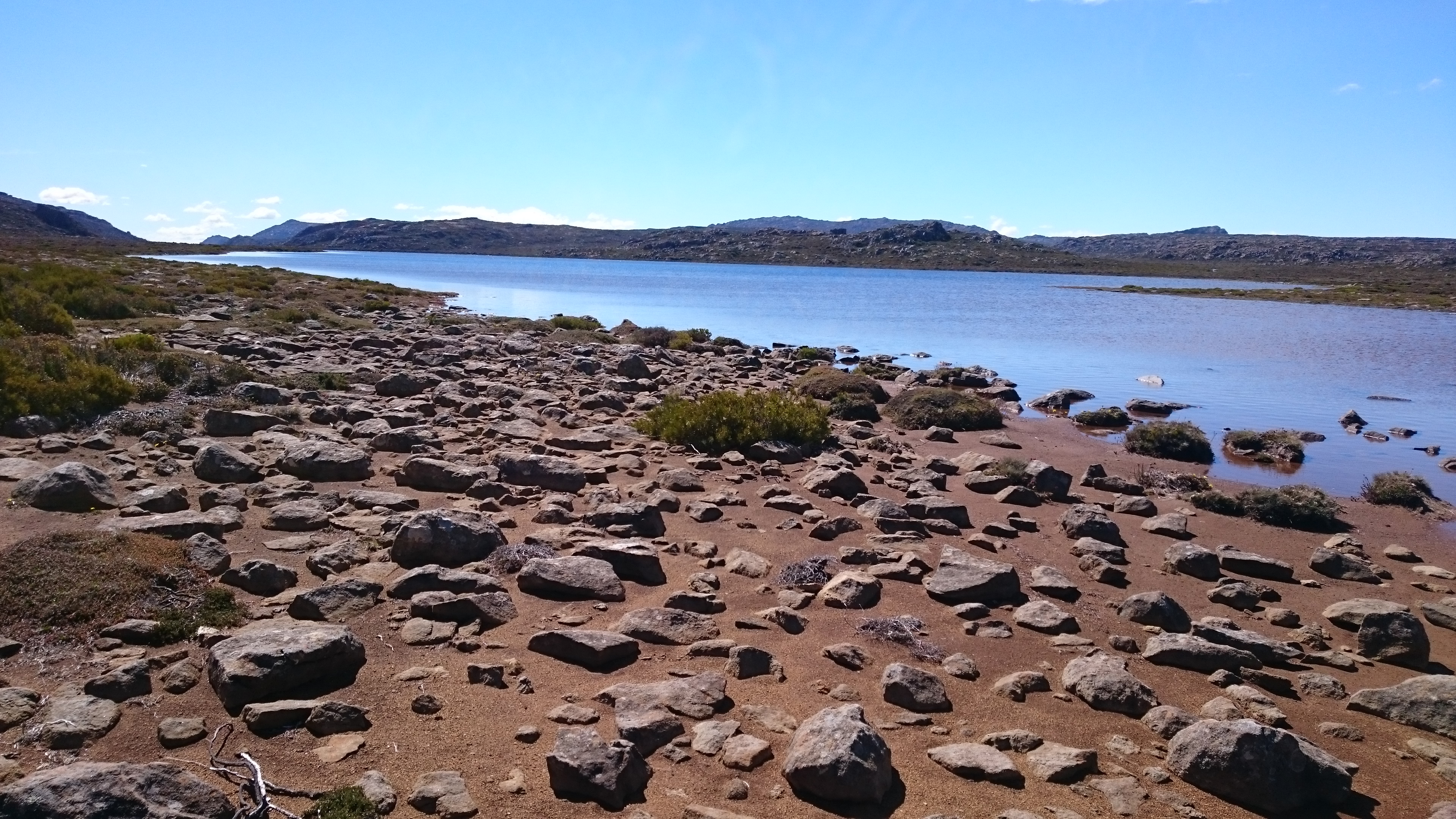
Lake Youl (palawa kani: minamata) on summit of Ben Lomond

== History ==
=== Aboriginal land-owners of Ben Lomond ===
The original inhabitants of the area were the people of the Ben Lomond Nation, which consisted of at least three clans totalling 150–200 people. Three clan names are known but their locations are somewhat conjectural - the clans were recorded as Plangermaireener, Plindermairhemener and Tonenerweenerlarmenne. The Plangermaireener clan is recorded as variously inhabiting the south-east aspect of the Ben Lomond region and also has been associated with the coastal tribes to the south-east. This clan was likely to have occupied the region of the modern day Fingal Valley to the St Mary's Plains and east coast region. 'Plangermaireener' is also used as a blanket term for all the members of the Ben Lomond Nation which reflects the suffix 'mairener', recorded as meaning 'people' or 'tribe'.

The Plindermairhemener clan is associated with the south and south-western aspects of the region and are likely to have occupied the South Esk Valley from the Avoca region up to at least the Nile River. Their country was bordered by the South Esk River to the south and west.

The location of the Tonenerweenerlarmenne is uncertain but were probably centred in the remaining Ben Lomond Nation territory from White Hills to the headwaters of the North and South-Esk rivers or the upper South-Esk Valley. This notwithstanding, the Palawa were a nomadic people and likely occupied their clan lands seasonally.

The clans of the Ben Lomond Nation hunted along the valleys of the South Esk and North Esk rivers, their tributaries and the highlands to the northeast; as well as making forays to the plateau in summer. There are records of aboriginal huts or dwellings around the foothills of Stacks Bluff and around the headwaters of the South Esk River near modern day Mathinna. There are also signs of regular occupation of the plateau by the Plangermaireener; artifacts such as stone tools are found about the low dunes at the eastern aspect of Lake Youl and in colonial times soldiers pursuing the Plangermaireener noted the 'native track' up onto the plateau from the foothills and remarked at the extensive evidence of summer occupation - with remains of firing seen about the plateau. Moreover, the remains of Aboriginal quarry works under Coalmine Crag suggest that the plateau was used for sustained periods by the Plangermaireener, as stone tools were needed for dressing game.

==== The Colonial Period ====
The clans of the Ben Lomond Nation were displaced in the early 1800s by extensive colonial occupation up the South Esk river and its tributaries. This particularly manifested along the mountain's western and northern boundaries, which lay closest to the settled areas of Launceston and Norfolk Plains (now Longford). Initial contact between the Ben Lomond people and British settlers was likely to have been on hunting grounds around the South or North Esk, as early in settlement hunting parties from Launceston made incursions into the plains south of the nascent city. First contact may well have been peaceable as convict hunters and aboriginal people traded kangaroos and hunting dogs early in the colony's history. Into the 1820s free land grants to wealthy settlers displaced convict hunters and led to the establishment of pastoralism at the Ben Lomond frontier, particularly up the Nile and Esk Rivers. The presence of farms and stockmen interrupted the migratory tribal life of the Aborigines and, although initial relations were peaceable, displacement was accelerated by continuing intrusion into country, abduction of aboriginal women and violent conflict with both settlers and with rival tribes. In particular, women became scarce due to the abduction by sealers of women in coastal areas, consequently leading to internecine raids for women across the interior.

In 1825 two convicts assigned to Andrew Barclay and James Cox on the Nile River, near Deddington, were killed and mutilated by Ben Lomond clanspeople in a dispute over women and ownership of hunting dogs. An aboriginal witness, Temina, testified that one man was killed by spearing and that a woman belonging to his people 'crushed his head with stones'.'. This was the first recorded of many violent encounters between the Plangermaireener and European settlers.

Children, also, were a target for abduction by settlers. For example, the prominent settler James Cox, at Clarendon on the Nile River, raised the Aboriginal William 'Black Bill' Ponsonby from a child.

Over time, the aboriginal people were forced into an ever more marginal existence and; with numbers depleted by disease, murder and abduction, were forced into sustained conflict with occupying settlers. In 1829 these remnants of the Ben Lomond nation allied with members of the North Midland nation in order to conduct guerilla style raids on remote stock huts:

"The black natives have again commenced their outrages in this district. About six weeks back they speared a shepherd belonging to Mr. Dark (near Deddington), in sight of that gentlemen’s house... About a week after that they robbed Mr. Bonney’s (at modern day Bonney's Plains near - Stacks Bluff ) stock hut of blankets, flour, sugar, etc. Three days after they pursued a shepherd of Mr. Massey’s (near Deddington); the same day they threw a spear at Mr. Sinclair’s shepherd; the spear passed over the man’s shoulder and through a ewe about two rods before him, which the man was driving. The man escaped by running from them. Last Saturday, week they speared and beat with their waddies a man of Mr. Reed’s, near the same spot. Yesterday they attacked a servant of Mr Sevoir's (of Sevoir gully, near Nile Bridge), whom they endeavoured to surround; the man saved his life by discharging his musket two or three times, and retreating every time until he got to his hut where other men were"

These attacks continued on huts and farms along the Ben Lomond frontier into 1829, with a war party plundering a stock hut belonging to John Batman in July and in the next month spearing of assigned men at Lord's property, killing a stonemason in his employ. As hostilities escalated across Tasmania in the Black War the colonial government authorised the employment of Roving Parties (essentially armed bounty hunters) to conciliate the remaining free aboriginal tribesmen. In September 1829, a party led by Batman, with the assistance of two mainland aboriginal men he had brought to Tasmania, and the Tasmanian Aborigine 'Black Bill' Ponsonby, led an attack on an Aboriginal family group together numbering 60–70 men, women and children in the mountain's south east foothills. Waiting until 11pm that night before attacking - 'killing or wounding 15'.

This must have proven to be a devastating setback to an increasingly desperate remnant of the Plangermaireener as they were scarcely seen on the Ben Lomond frontier from that time. Remnant Plangermaireener women were subsequently found in the Piper River region and reported lethal internecine conflict between the Ben Lomond people and a confederation of Oyster Bay and Big River clansmen - resulting in the death of all but 6 of the Plangermairreener men.

In winter 1830 the Ben Lomond people were noted to be absent from their traditional wintering grounds on the East Coast and never again would family groups be seen collecting eggs and fish from the lagoons at Oyster Bay.

The latter half of 1830 saw an increase in frontier violence as the Black War reached its nadir. During the spring of 1830 an Aboriginal party was noted to have crossed the Midlands from the 'Westward' to the Ben Lomond frontier and, within a fortnight, Batman reported in a dispatch that a marauding party of clansmen were raiding up the South Esk Valley. The raiding party attacked several remote settler and stockman's huts from Oyster Bay to Avoca - alongside their traditional hunting and travelling route on the Ben Lomond frontier. Their aim appeared to be both robbery and revenge and during their raids they killed 5 assigned men and wounded several others severely, reportedly only being prevented from killing an entire family by the presence of soldiers.

However, by late 1830, remnants of the Aboriginal clans were living a precarious existence on the edge of the frontier, harried by alert colonial settlers and militia and denied access to their hunting grounds. As the infamous 'Black Line' military operation was being disbanded elsewhere in Tasmania, George Augustus Robinson spent a week in north-east Tasmania searching without success for the Ben Lomond people. By this time, Robinson considered that the Plangermaireener were reduced to just 10 individuals.

In December 1830, Robinson had relocated 33 Tasmanian Aboriginals to nearby Swan Island and he subsequently sent a party searching throughout the northeast looking for the remnants of the Ben Lomond, and north-eastern peoples, without success.

Attacks on colonials decreased after the military action of the Black Line but in early 1831 three assigned men of Thomas Massey were wounded by Aboriginal clansmen near modern day Deddington and this is the last reported conflict between settlers and Aboriginal clansmen at the Ben Lomond frontier.

=== The fate of the Ben Lomond people ===
After the failure of the 'Black Line' in 1830, and after pressure from settlers, Colonial Governor George Arthur announced on 14 March 1831 his new policy of the removal of Aborigines from Tasmania. The conciliator George Augustus Robinson was tasked with rounding up the remnant aboriginal people. Robinson "....gave an unequivocal commitment that if hostilities ceased, Aborigines would be protected and have their essential needs met by the government while being able to live and hunt within their own districts." These concessions, combined with the promised return of their women from the sealers, were the terms under which the chief Mannalargenna joined Robinson's embassy. Mannalargenna was either a Plangermaireener or Oyster Bay Chief (or perhaps a leader of a confederation of the two Nations) - an Aboriginal leader who had organised guerrilla attacks against British settlers in Van Diemen's Land during the Black War. Mannarlargenna has been praised for attempting to preserve the remnants of his people with his bargain or treaty with Arthur and Robinson. It would ultimately lead to the end of hostilities with the Aboriginal people, although at the expense of exile, as the remnant aboriginal people were moved en masse to Wybalenna ('Black Man's Houses' in the Ben Lomond Nation language) on Flinder's Island - where Mannarlargenna died of pneumonia.

At Wybalenna the remnant of the Ben Lomond people were encamped with aboriginal people from other, often rival, nations. The process of cultural assimilation began here, with compulsory attendance at Christian services mandated. At Wybalenna aboriginal people continued their resistance to oppression: Walter George Arthur; the son of Rolepana, a Ben Lomond Nation elder became the first Australian Aboriginal activist when he petitioned Queen Victoria in 1846 in protest at the treatment of his people. The aboriginal people fared poorly at Wybalenna and then when relocated to Oyster Cove, with disease and malnutrition contributing to high mortality and low birth rates.

The Ben Lomond Nation ceased to exist as a political and cultural entity after the occupation of their country and the subsequent murder, abduction or exile of its people. When the last people of that nation died at Oyster Cove on the Derwent much of the history that had persisted for generations died with them. The Palawa did not die out- descendants of the 'tyreelore', Palawa women taken as wives by sealers in Bass Strait, continued to live in a prosperous community on Flinders and Cape Barren Islands. Many of these descendants have cultural and genetic lineage from the Ben Lomond Nation and with the chief Mannarlargenna, in particular.

== Modern history ==
=== Exploration in Colonial times ===
The first European to ascend the mountain was likely to have been Batman, who is recorded to have crossed the plateau in his forays against the Ben Lomond Nation. In 1829, with a party of soldiers, he ascended the plateau from the foothills, noting the 'native track' onto the summit and the extensive firing of the plateau by the Plangermaireener from their regular summer occupation.

The artist John Glover ascended the mountain with Batman in the 1833 accompanied by the surveyor John Wedge and Batman's mainland aboriginal servants. Glover made sketches that clearly show the bluffs on the south-eastern escarpment, views of Lake Youl and the view of Tranquil Tarn from the eastern face. Although no paintings of the ascent have survived there was at least one painting exhibited in 1835 that portrayed the summit of Ben Lomond.

=== Surveying the mountain ===
The first scientific visit to the Ben Lomond plateau was made by the Polish explorer Paul Edmond de Strzelecki on 28 November 1841 and he measured the height of Stacks Bluff (albeit incorrectly) by barometry as 5002 feet. In 1852; after the site was surveyed by James Sprent, the Government Surveyor, a Trigonometric Point was constructed on Stacks Bluff (the southernmost extremity of Ben Lomond) using convict labour. A Full survey of Ben Lomond was conducted from September 1905 to 1912 by Colonel W.V. Legge and, later, Lyndhurst Giblin took over the survey. The surveyors climbed to the plateau from Mangana but on some of the later visits they ascended via Avoca and the Ben Lomond Marshes. The nomenclature of features on the mountain were established at this time and were named after members of the survey party and famous explorers of the period. The survey party explored the highlands on the north of the plateau in 1907. Legge had long suspected that the north of the plateau was higher than the trigonometric station on Stacks Bluff (called by him Ben Lomond Fell or Bluff) but was less obviously elevated. Moreover, the area was, at the time, an area so remote and unexplored that Legge described it as 'untrodden as the distant ranges of the west coast'. Lyndhurst Giblin climbed and measured the true summit and named it after Legge. and, in turn, the prominent bluff to the south of the summit was named for Giblin's father - Giblin Fells. Giblin and his cousin-in-law, Herman Robert Hutchison, a licensed surveyor, made definitive measurements in 1912.

=== Mining ===
==== Gold ====
In 1854 exploratory parties seeking gold, and sponsored by the Colonial Government, explored the plateau of Ben Lomond, driving bores and claiming to find 'particles of gold' But it was alluvial gold, below the summit, that proved payable and was mined to the east of Ben Lomond at Tower Hill, Mathinna and Mangana from 1855 until the 1940s. At its peak Mathinna had a population of 2000 but this dwindled after mining ceased. Tin and tungsten were the other minerals to be obtained in the southern foothills of Ben Lomond and the townships of Rossarden and Storys Creek arose from the 1920s to 1957 around these mines.

==== Coal ====
In 1829, coal deposits were found by a British party, led by Batman, which was pursuing a group of Plangermaireener onto the plateau. The party collected coal which was successfully burnt after descending from the mountain. Later, a seam was excavated on the plateau, at Coalmine Crag, from which coal was extracted for local use in the ski village and, possibly, by trappers. It is not known whether the Aboriginal inhabitants of the region used this coal for burning or decoration but there is an indigenous word for coal (conara) and the seams are exposed and easily accessible in the vicinity of Raffertys Creek and Coalmine Crag. Coal was found in commercial quantities at the head of the Ben Lomond Rivulet in 1857 but the seam was mined at the Stanhope Mine, situated on Buffalo Brook about halfway between Stacks Bluff and Avoca.

===== Mining exploration =====
Mining interests also existed on the north-west of the mountain, around the island peak of Ragged Jack, where the prospect of silver and tin was investigated, but they proved to be economically unviable.

=== Aquaculture ===
Loch Leven trout fry were released into Lake Youl in 1905 in an attempt to establish recreational fishing on the mountain. Recent survey of fauna on the mountain shows no evidence of fish in Lake Youl.

=== Proclamation as National Park ===
Proposals for Ben Lomond to be made a scenic reserve were made as early as 1910 - as a reaction to frequent fires on the plateau. Ben Lomond was declared a National Park and Scenic Reserve in July 1947. The park encompassed nearly 40,000 acres of land that had previously been declared a fauna reserve although land already set aside for the Forestry Commission was excluded from the park.

=== Recreation on Ben Lomond ===
==== Recreational walking tracks onto the mountain ====
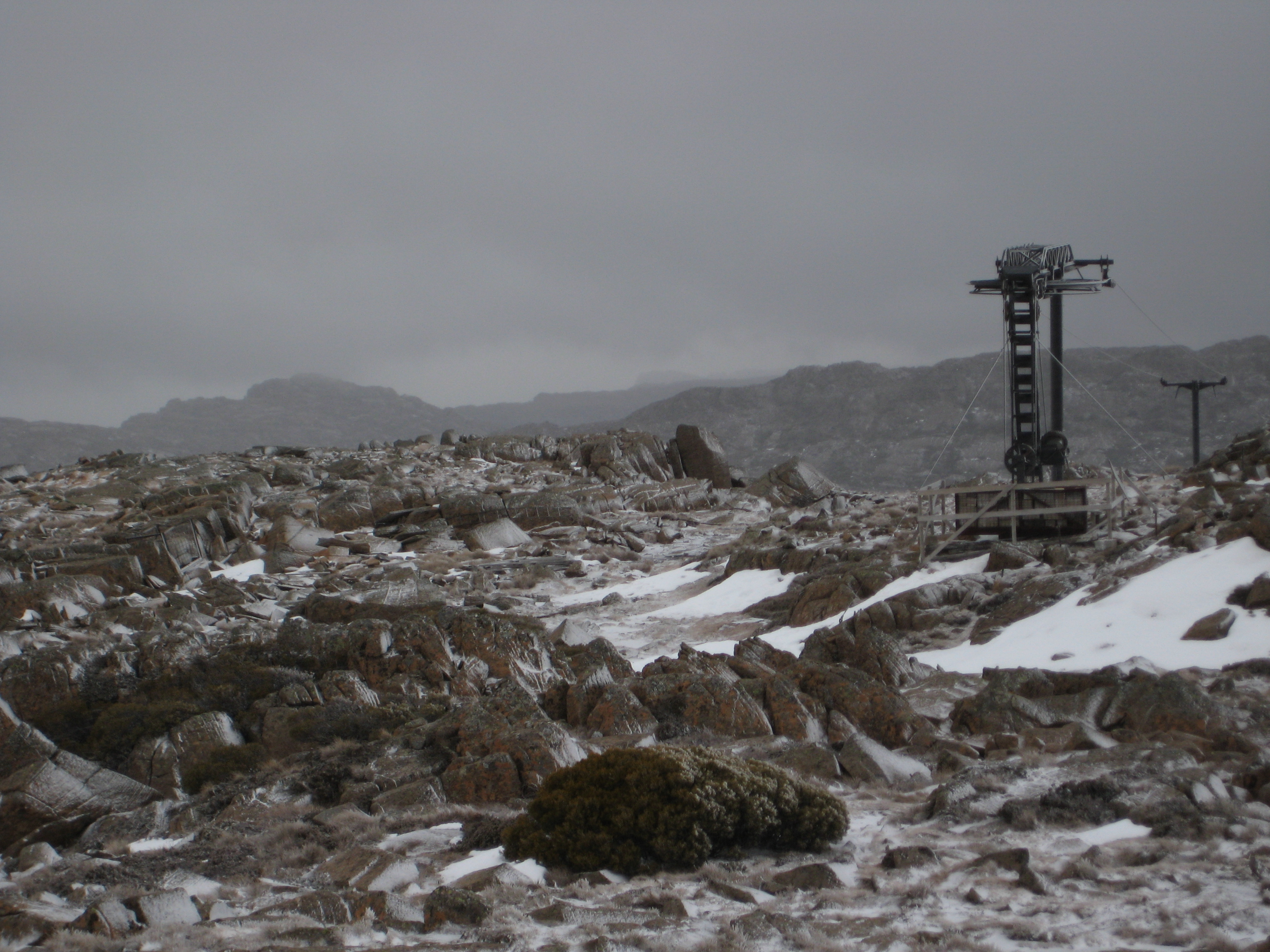
Legges Tor from the summit looking towards the Ben Lomond Ski Resort.

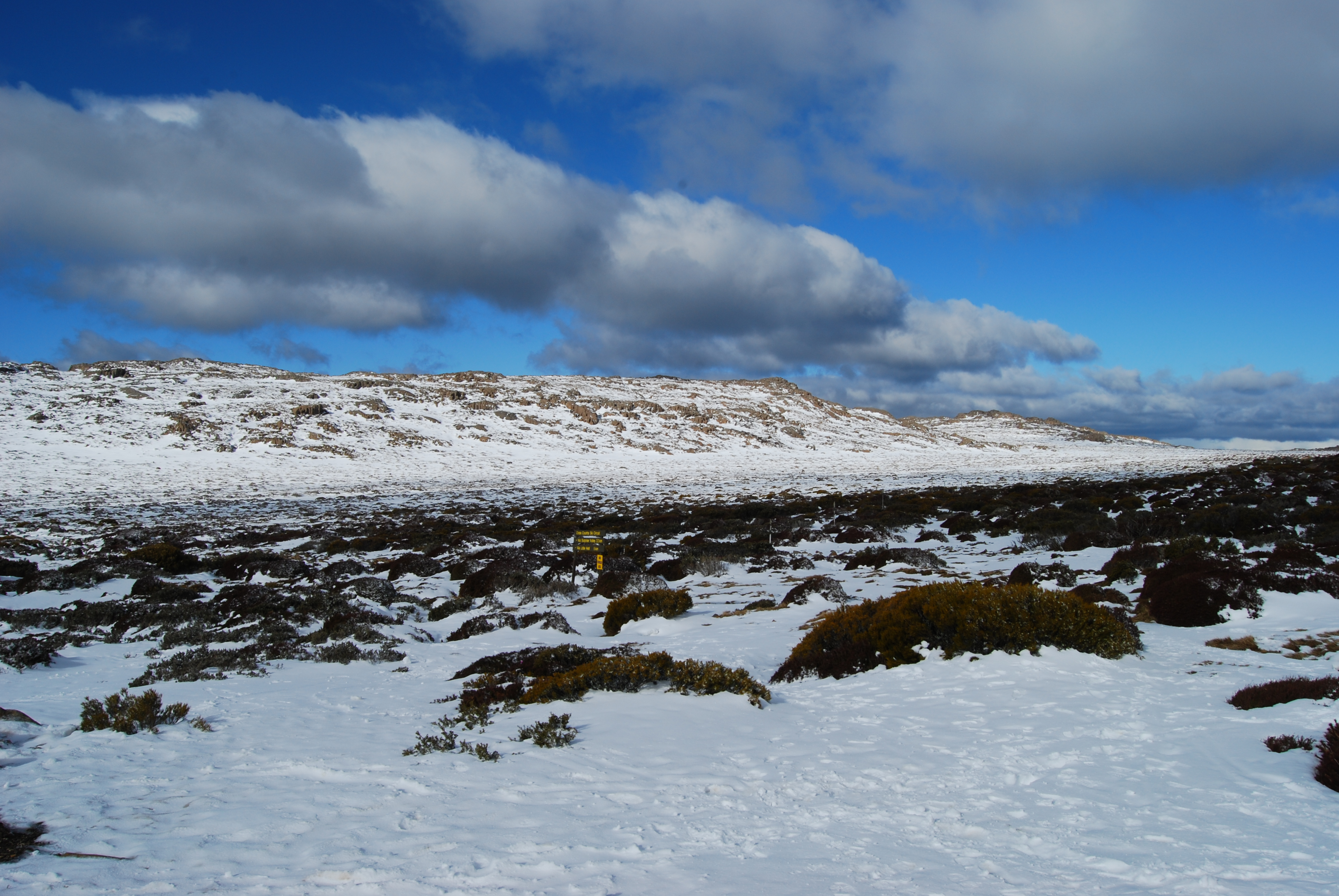
Ben Lomond snowfields.

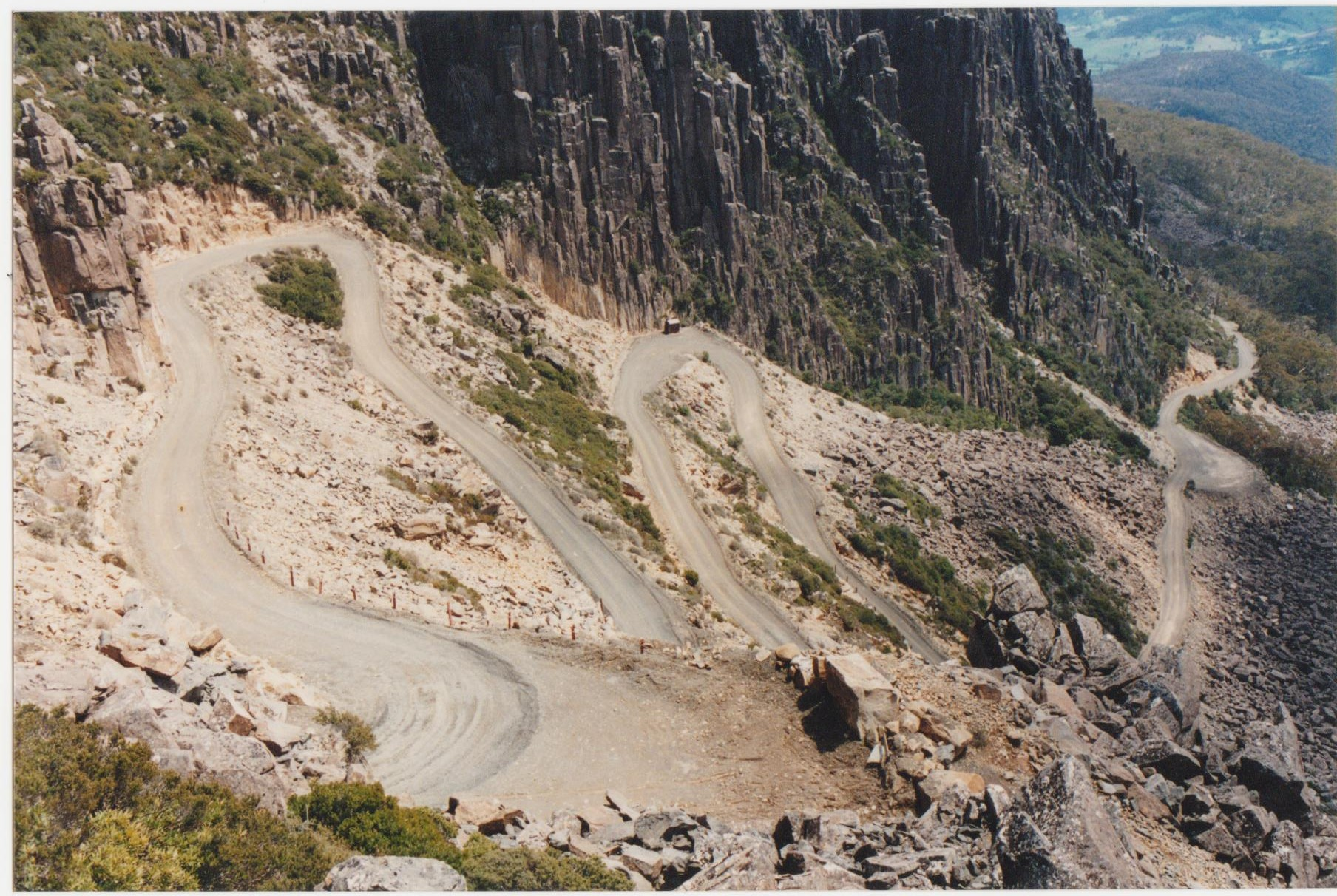
Jacob's Ladder single lane access road to Mount Ben Lomond in Tasmania Australia

Recreational walking on and around the plateau was established from at least the mid 1830s, usually for the purpose of summiting Stacks Bluff, but it was not until the 1880s, when the mines had brought large numbers into the area, that walking on the plateau became popular. At this time the principal track to the plateau lay across the Ben Lomond Marshes ascending the western side of Stacks Bluff. This track led from Avoca, up Castle Cary Rivulet to the Ben Lomond Marshes, to the plateau on the western side of Stacks Bluff and along the headwaters of the Ben Lomond Rivulet. The track was describes as passing up the 'Ploughed Fields' (the scree slope below Stacks Bluff) and proceeding through a pass between Wilmot Bluff and the western cliff line called by locals 'The Gap'. Avoca, being located on the Fingal train line from Launceston, was the staging point for excursions to the mountain, with local guides arranging packhorses, camping equipment and suitable campsites below the plateau.

A track from Mangana was created in the early 20th century for the purposes of attracting walking tourists onto the plateau. The summit was '9 miles from Mangana', led up the eastern escarpment and was used later by Legge for his survey of the mountain. This track passed by a hut below the plateau (complete with stables) and was regarded as an easy ascent to the plateau Another steep track existed from Storys Creek which is still used to ascend via Tranquil Tarn to the summit of Stack's Bluff. The western face of Ben Lomond was accessed from English Town and this track took a course round the northern slopes of Ragged Jack. This is the original route for access for skiers before the northern route was established from Carr Villa hut.

Early 20th-century ski access track

Excursions in the 1880s became popular enough for a landowner to build a two-storey hotel with 12 rooms, a store, bakehouse and stables at the northern end of the Ben Lomond Marshes for the use of excursionists and miners. This was the 'Ben Lomond Hotel', which was built in 1883, and was a popular staging point for the walk up to the plateau, but by 1908 the hotel had been abandoned and fallen into disrepair. The Ben Lomond Hotel continued to be used as a staging hut for guided excursions up to the plateau from Avoca into the 20th century.

Today, formed tracks exist that access the plateau from the northern, northeastern and south-eastern aspects of the massif. The northern access track is from the Scout hut at Carr Villa, in the northern foothills, to the summit (following the snow pole line of the old ski track) and thence to the ski village. The island peak Ragged Jack has established walking and climbing routes that are accessed via the north west foothills. The southern access is from Storys Creek, past Tranquil Tarn, to the northern slopes of Stacks Bluff. A track leads up to the summit cairn of Stacks Bluff, which affords extensive views of the entire eastern half of Tasmania. The plateau is relatively open walking but no other marked tracks exist, although guide books describe access to various features on the plateau.

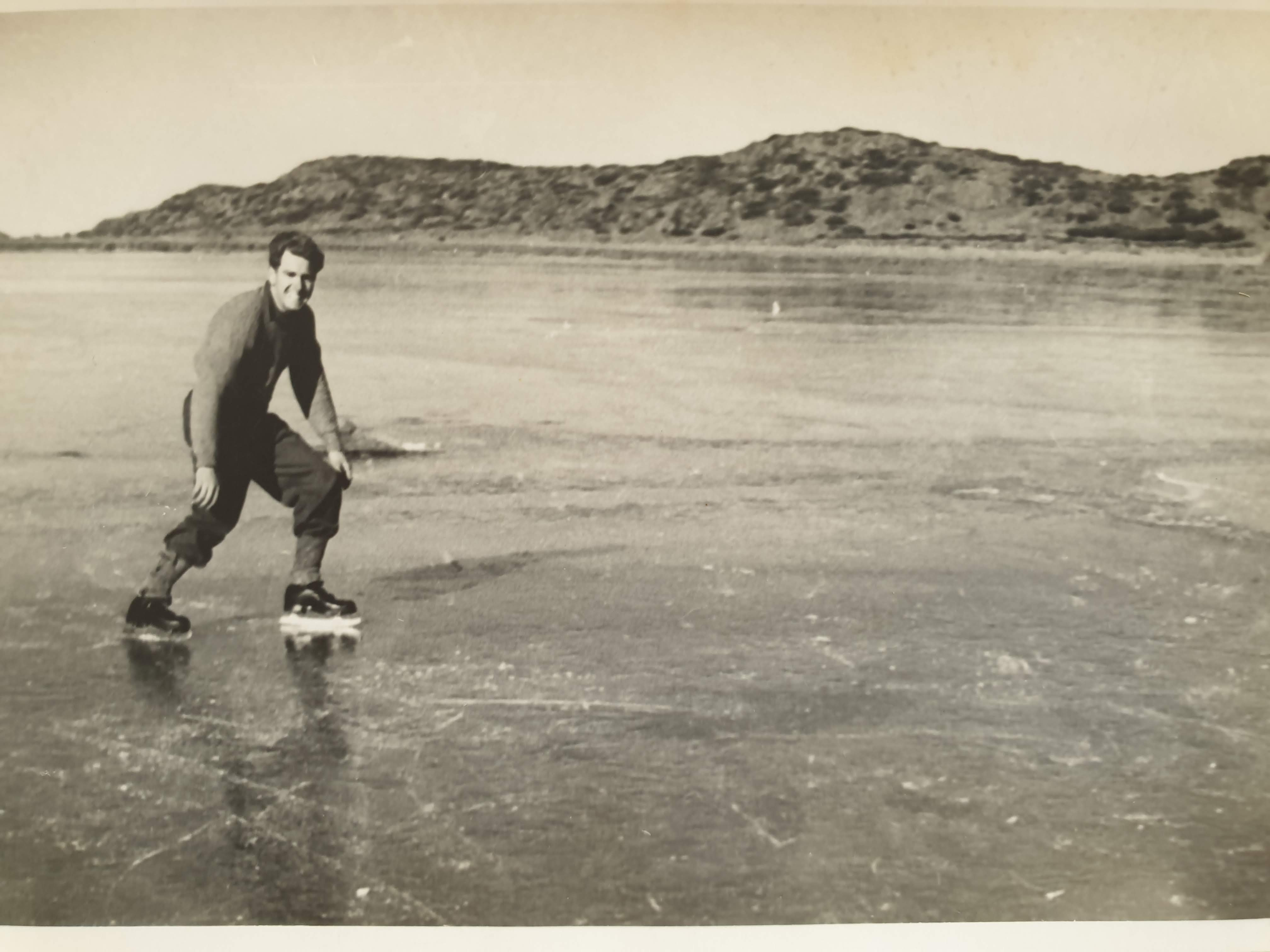
Clive French, from the Launceston Walking Club, skating on Lake Youl c. 1950

==== Skiing ====
The Northern Tasmanian Alpine Club formed in 1929 and pioneered trips to the mountain and improved the access track. In July 1929 Fred Smithies, a pioneer of skiing on Ben Lomond, accompanied the Tasmanian government's Tourism Director on a field trip to the plateau with the aim of establishing the feasibility of a skifield.

Their route was by way of English Town, Ragged Jack and the headwaters of River O'Plain Creek (see image). This route had the disadvantage that it involved an extended walk to get onto the plateau but was less steep than the alternative access from Blessington. The northern route was subsequently selected after a suitable route was found through the help of a local farmer, beginning from the Upper Blessington road at Wattle Corner.

In 1932, a chalet was built under the northern escarpment, facilitating access to the summit ski slopes. This chalet was named 'Carr Villa' - named from a sign taken from the Carr Villa cemetery tram stop in Launceston - humorously celebrating a Mr Carr, a member of the ski club. The first permanent summit hut was constructed 4 years later to allow skiers to overnight on the summit. A smaller hut was constructed at the head of the pass to the plateau for the purposes of shelter and storage of ski gear. The remains of this hut can be seen from the walking track as it crests the pass into the Borrowdale Valley.

Access to Carr Villa, at 900m elevation, was by foot until a road was constructed in 1959 but then the summit was still a 500m ascent on foot from this point. Carr Villa chalet is now operated by the Rover Scouts after it was donated by NTAC in 1963 and the skiers access track is part of the Legges Tor circuit walking track.

In 1950 a Parliamentary Standing Committee recommended that Ben Lomond be developed as a ski resort. The Australian National Championships were held at the site in 1955. In 1963 the access road was extended to the top of the plateau via the steep and scenic "Jacobs Ladder". Subsequent developments have included new ski lifts, visitor facilities, a licensed inn and accommodation, sewerage system, and improved access. The Ben Lomond Skifield Management Authority was formed in 1995 to manage the Skifield Development Area.

Today, Tasmania's premier Alpine skiing operations are located at Ben Lomond, 60 kilometres (37 mi) from Launceston. Located in the Ben Lomond National Park, the village is at 1,460 metres (4,790 ft) and the top elevation is 1,570 metres (5,150 ft). A number of club lodges provide accommodation and the mountain has fine views which stretch to the ocean. In 2010, the Department of Parks and Wildlife released a plan for the Ben Lomond ski area recommending snow making machines, the enhancement of snow play areas and the development of a possible snow board park.

==== Cycling ====
Jacobs Ladder has been made notorious as the steep training ground for Tour de France cyclist Richie Porte and is featured as a cycling destination in itself. Mountain-bikers enjoy the fire trails around the mountain, commercial downhill rides down Jacobs Ladder and a multisport event in the vicinity.

== Geography ==
The locality has an area of 182.6 square kilometres (70.5 sq mi), almost all of which is occupied by the Ben Lomond National Park.

== Road infrastructure ==
The C432 route (Ben Lomond Road) enters from the north-west and runs south-east to a skiing village, where it ends.

== See also ==
- List of highest mountains of Tasmania
- Skiing in Tasmania
- Mount Mawson
