= Thwaites (surname) =

Thwaites is a surname. Notable people with the surname include:

- Ann Thwaytes (1789–1866) English philanthropist also known as Mrs Thwaites
- Brenton Thwaites (born 1989), Australian actor
- Bryan Thwaites (born 1923), English applied mathematician, educationalist and administrator
- Caitlin Thwaites (born 1986), Australian netball and volleyball player
- Daniel Thwaites, Sr. (1777–1843), founder of Thwaites Brewery
- Daniel Thwaites (1817–1888), English brewer and Liberal Party politician
- David Thwaites (born 1976), British actor
- Denis Thwaites (1944–2015), English professional footballer who played outside left
- Edward Thwaites (1667–1711), English scholar of the Anglo-Saxon language
- F. J. Thwaites (1908–1979), Australian novelist
- George Henry Kendrick Thwaites (1812–1882), British botanist and entomologist whose standard author abbreviation is Thwaites
- Guy Thwaites (born 1971), British professor
- John Thwaites (disambiguation)
  - John Barrass (Jack) Thwaites (1902–1986), Tasmanian bushwalker and conservationist
  - John Anthony Thwaites (1909–1981), British art critic and author
  - John Thwaites (Australian politician) (born 1955)
  - John Thwaites (British politician) (1815–1870)
- Kate Thwaites (born 1980), Australian politician)
- Michael Thwaites (1915–2005), Australian academic, poet and intelligence officer
- Reuben Gold Thwaites (1853–1913), American historical writer
- Robinson Thwaites (1807-1884), English mechanical engineer and mill-owner
- Ronald Thwaites (born 1945), Jamaican minister and politician; see Constituencies of Jamaica
- Thomas Thwaites (disambiguation)
  - Thomas Thwaites (civil servant) (c.1435–1503), English civil servant
  - Thomas Thwaites (cricketer) (1910-2000), Australian cricketer
  - Thomas Thwaites (designer), British designer and writer
- William Thwaites (1868–1947), former Commander of the British Army of the Rhine

== See also ==
- Thwaites (disambiguation)
