= Thwaites =

Thwaites, Thwaits, or Thwaytes may refer to:

== Companies ==
- Thwaites Brewery
- Thwaites Dumpers
- Thwaites & Reed, oldest clockmakers in the world

== Surnames ==
- Thwaites (surname)
- Thwaits (surname)

== Places ==
- Thwaites, Bradford, a U.K. location
- Thwaites, Cumbria, England
- Thwaites, Ontario, Canada
- Thwaites Glacier, Antarctica
  - Thwaites Ice Shelf, Antarctica

== See also ==
- Thwaite (disambiguation)
