= Thomas Thwaites =

Thomas Thwaites can refer to:

- Thomas Thwaites (civil servant) (c.1435–1503), English civil servant
- Thomas Thwaites (cricketer) (1910–2000), Australian cricketer
- Thomas Thwaites (designer), British designer
