= K.R.H. Sonderborg =

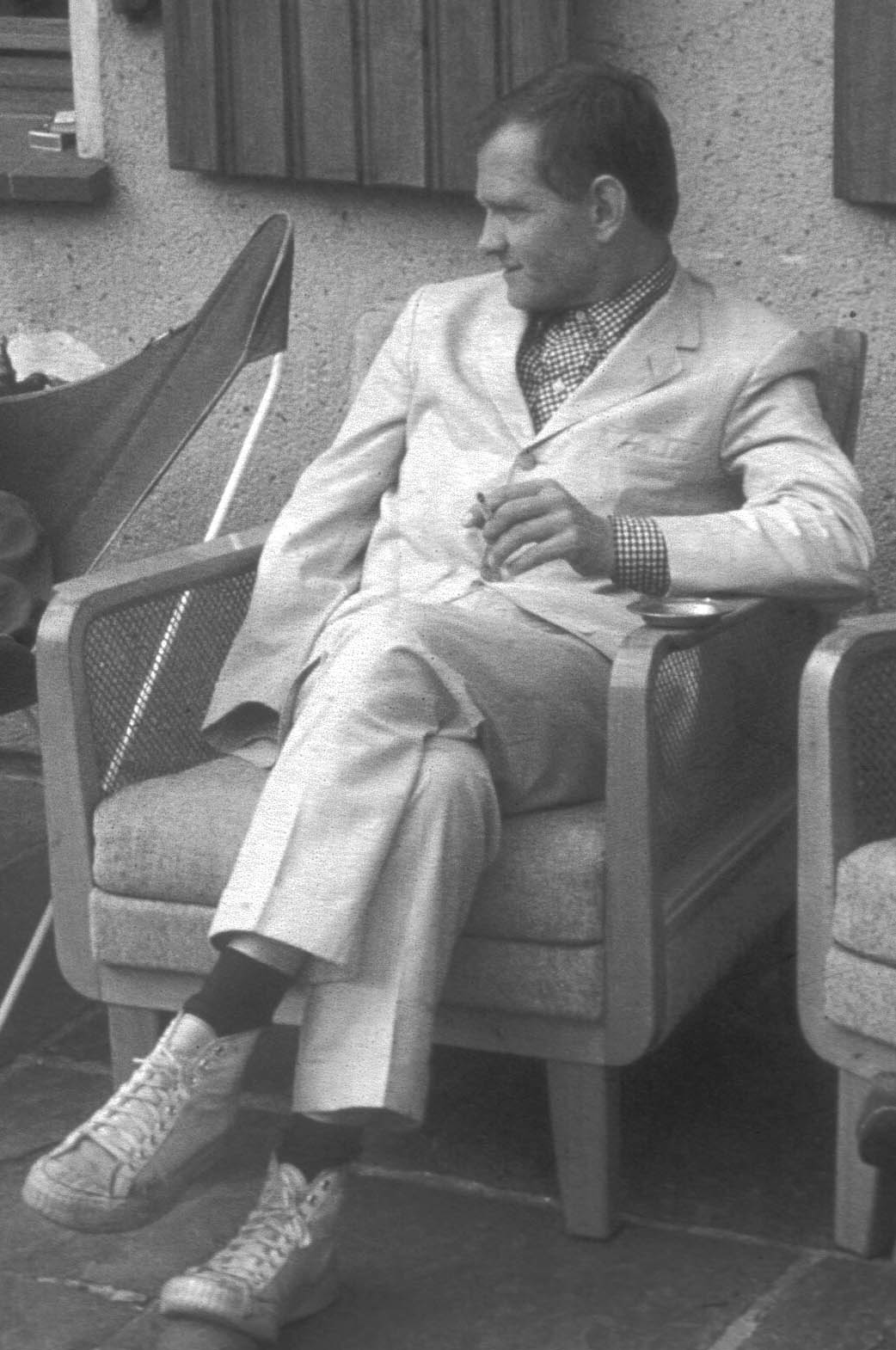
- Sonderborg 1962 in Hannover, Germany
- Born: 5 April 1923; Denmark
- Died: 18 February 2008 (aged 84); Hamburg
- Education: Hamburg University 1947 - 49
- Known for: Painter, New Media Art
- Notable work: in actu
- Movement: Informel
- Awards: 1963 Large Int. Prize for drawing the 7th Biennale Sao Paulo; 1984 Member of the Academy of the Arts Berlin, Chevalier de l'Ordre des Arts et des Lettres, Paris; 1989 State Prize of Baden-Württemberg

K.R.H. Sonderborg (1923–2008) was a German painter, graphic artist, university professor, and from 1980 prorector of the State Academy of Fine Arts Stuttgart for several years.

He was born in Sønderborg/Als, Denmark. Starting in 1953, he became a member of the group Zen 49, and studied at the Atelier 17 in St. W. Hayter in Paris. In the years 1953–1965, he spent time working in London, New York City, Tokyo, Chicago, Osaka, Cornwall, Ascona, Rome and Paris.

In 1951, the artist Kurt Rudolf Hoffmann called himself K.R.H. Sonderborg, after the town he was born in. Sonderborg went to school in Hamburg and completed a merchant's apprenticeship in 1939. He became a private student of the painter Ewald Becker-Carus in Hamburg in 1946. From 1947 to 1949 he studied painting, graphic art, and textile design at the State Art School in Hamburg under Willem Grimm and Maria May. In 1953 he joined the artists group Zen 49. He went to Paris the same year where he received training in engraving from Stanley William Hayter in the Atelier 17. Paris is also the place where he first encountered Tachism. In the following years, the artist went on longer journeys and worked for some time in London, Cornwall, New York, Ascona, Rome, and Paris again. In New York K.R.H. Sonderborg came into contact with Action Painting.

His own style became abstract, painting in swift broad strokes, that reveal the painting process, with spontaneous color application. Black and white contrasts are an important feature, later he added colors such as cadmium red. K.R.H. Sonderborg took part in the 1958 Biennale in Venice. He was awarded the Prize for Graphic Art at the Biennale in Tokyo in 1960 and the Great International Prize for Drawing at the 1963 Biennale in São Paulo. The artist showed works at the Documenta in Kassel in both 1959 and 1964. From 1965 to 1990 he held a post as Professor for Painting at the State Academy of Fine Arts Stuttgart. In 1969/70 he was a guest lecturer at the Minneapolis College of Art and Design, as well as at the Art Institute of Chicago in 1986. At the suggestion of Rector Wolfgang Kermer, he was Vice Rector of the State Academy of Fine Arts Stuttgart from 1980 to 1984. Along with artists such as Karl Otto Götz, and Bernhard Schulze, K.R.H. Sonderborg is one of the most important and most impressive representatives of German Informal Art.

K.R.H. Sonderborg died in Hamburg on 18 February 2008, aged 84.
