= Thwaite =

Thwaite may refer to:

== Placenames ==
- Thwaite (placename element)
- Thwaite, North Norfolk, England
- Thwaite St Mary, South Norfolk, England
- Thwaite, North Yorkshire, England
- Thwaite, Suffolk, England

== Buildings ==
- Thwaite Hall, University of Hull hall of residence
- Thwaite Mills, industrial museum in Leeds, England
- Thwaite Priory, former building in Lincolnshire, England

== Other ==
- Thwaite (surname)

== See also ==
- Thwaites (disambiguation)
- Thorp and thorpe, similarly archaic placename elements
