= John Thwaites =

John Thwaites may refer to:

- John Thwaites (British politician) (1815–1870)
- John Thwaites (Australian politician) (born 1955)
- John Anthony Thwaites (1909–1981), British art critic and author
- Jack Thwaites (1902–1986), British-Australian conservationist
