= The Lambrecht-Schadeberg Collection =

The Lambrecht-Schadeberg Collection (Sammlung Lambrecht-Schadeberg/Rubenspreisträger der Stadt Siegen in German) contains diverse works from all phases of each awardee of the Rubens Prize of the City of Siegen.

== History ==
The patron Barbara Lambrecht-Schadeberg (1935-) began specifically collecting the works of Rubens Prize awardees in 1992 to raise awareness around the Ruben Prize. She is a native of Siegerland (Krombach and Kreuztal). In 1961, she became a co-partner of the family brewery Krombacher Brauerei Bernhard Schadeberg GmbH & Co. She created the Barbara Schadeberg Foundation back in 1994 to promote a Christian style of upbringing and education. She also collected impressionist and post-impressionist paintings since the 1970s (Berthe Morisot, Eva Gonzalès, Claude Monet, Raoul Dufy, Kees van Dongen). Her reorientation went along with general endeavours regarding the foundation of a museum of contemporary art in Siegen. She became the patron of the Museum für Gegenwartskunst Siegen, which opened in 2001. She provided the collection of paintings to the foundation as a permanent loan. In 2015, Lambrecht-Schadeberg announced her retirement from the foundation's management board. In 2016, she received the Federal Cross of Merit.

In 2017, the museum acquired Francis Bacon's Painting 1962, the sixth Bacon of the collection, and sold 2 Morisot (Femme en noir and Femme et enfant au balcon), 1 Monet (Les Bords de la Seine au Petit-Gennevilliers), 1 van Dongen (Les deux Anges), and 1 Picasso (Lluis Alemany). In 2018, the collection acquired the painting Turn by Bridget Riley and a group of 85 photographs of Sigmar Polke.

== Description ==
The Lambrecht-Schadeberg Collection consists of more than 200 works by Hans Hartung, Giorgio Morandi, Francis Bacon, Antoni Tápies, Fritz Winter, Emil Schumacher, Cy Twombly, Rupprecht Geiger, Lucian Freud, Maria Lassnig, Sigmar Polke, and Bridget Riley.

The collection is exhibited permanently in the Museum für Gegenwartskunst, a contemporary art museum. Regularly alternating exhibitions show representative examples from the Rubens Prize awardees’ various phases of work. The individual artistic positions offer an insight into the European history of painting.

The collection is a significant part of the cultural life of the Siegerland, an area in the south of North Rhine-Westphalia.
