= Georg August Stahl =

German painter

Georg August Stahl (1903–1981) Born in 1903 in Kassel in the State of Hessen, Germany, Stahl began drawing and working in water colors at the age of seventeen. He received his formal training at the Academy of Fine Arts in Kassel on a scholarship, with an emphasis on wood cuts. The expressionistic character of this earliest work, bearing a certain reminiscence of German Expressionism of the twenties, could be expected given the importance of the medium in German art of that period. Reminiscent only, for the work shows already an unusual independence, a directness and clarity whereas his watercolors manifest a natural harmony in composition and subtlety in color.

== Early life (1930-1945) ==
Stahl emigrated to the Netherlands in 1930 because of his active political involvement against the rapidly growing power of the National Socialists and their threats to ban his work. He found immediate acceptance in progressive art circles in Rotterdam and later in Amsterdam. Extreme material hardship and the threat of war by the now well established Nazi regime not only affected his artistic development, but forced him into hiding after the German occupation of the Netherlands in 1940, that consequently led to a virtual standstill in his work. He was discovered and forcefully drafted into German army in 1943. He deserted to the Allied Forces half a year later during the Invasion of Normandy and was a prisoner of war of the British Army until 1947 when he returned to the Netherlands. During his stay in England, he was allowed to paint and travel to the Lake District for studies.

== Later life ==
When, after the collapse of the Third Reich in 1945, the political division of Germany rapidly took shape into what would officially become in 1949 the Federal Republic in the West and in the same year the German Democratic Republic (DDR) in the East, the (official) directions for the developments in the visual arts were also set: Socialist realism after the Russian model in East Germany and abstract art in West Germany where influences of the lyric abstraction of the Ecole de Paris and the New York School dominated. Stahl belonged to what could be called the 'mid-generation' of German artists, born around or shortly after the turn of the century, like Willi Baumeister, Fritz Winter, Ernst Wilhelm Nay, and Theodor Werner. Contrary to Stahl, as an emigrated autodidact, they all were able to secure an artistic basis before the Nazis came to power something that would be of decisive importance for their post war careers. They also belonged to the very few leading artists, that had remained in Germany, or returned from captivity and were therefore immediately identified with the new beginning of German art, soon to be followed by the younger generation of artists that stood at the beginning of their career.

The art scene after 1946 in the Netherlands and Germany was characterized by rapid Europeanization and to an extent Internationalization. The majority of the European Governments, including Germany and the Netherlands adhered, however, sternly to nationally oriented art politics, despite these developments. Given the fact that the arts were, and still are, largely federally funded and subsidized gave the respective Ministries of Culture a decisive influence on the international exposure of art and artist(s) that they considered to be representative for, in this case, 'Dutch' - or in less explicit terms 'German' art. This given political reality, although never spelled out explicitly as such, blocked the way to any official recognition for a German artist living and working in the Netherlands or in Germany for a German artist living and working in the Netherlands, as was the case with Stahl.

== Exhibition ==
Stahl was, despite regular exhibitions engaged in a constant battle just to survive, supported by a few but faithful friends and collectors. In 1960, by a mere coincidence, the director of the municipal collections of the city of Kassel, Dr. Walter Kramm, offered Stahl to mount a retrospective exposition of his work of over 100 works. The show had to be postponed and rescheduled, because Stahl suffered a near fatal heart attack at the end of that year. As a result of the conditions he had been working under for so long and the tension added by the mere thought of the logistics of such an undertaken and the request of the museum of additional new work. The opening took place in the summer of 1962, at which occasion the Dutch art critic and philosopher Drs. Hans Redeker spoke, who since 1953 had advanced Stahl's work for a wider and official recognition in the Netherlands.

This first retrospective was followed by a second one in 1964, in which also more than forty works of Fritz Winter were shown, whose work Dr. Kramm had avidly been buying for years.*, under the title "Wege zur Kunst unserer Zeit", (Roads towards the Art of our Time).This event was of special importance given Winter's position in the West German art world, as mentioned before, and his contributions to German painting in general. By positioning the work of both artists next to one another Dr. Kramm demonstrated that, what Redeker in his philosophical approach to the origins and developments of Stahls work had already formulated in detail, pertained equally so to the work of Fritz Winter. They can be summarised in a very condensed form as follows: "That what fascinates me more and more over the years, as a possible access to the art of Georg Stahl, is the fact that the entire Time-Space question and the manner in which it is being answered in today's philosophical anthropology is of fundamental importance also for that what manifests itself, mainly unconsciously and at a far distance from any philosophical thinking as the road of the visual arts of our century. This Time-Space question revolves around the philosophical interpretation of man : "....not as an object, as a substantial thing with properties, but as a living externalization of all his activities, that are characteristic for his being a human.", " .....man finds himself with thousands of fine threads outside of himself, he is spread out in time and space" One of the consequences, which this definition has for modern art, as Redeker continues to argue is, that by radically turning his back on the perspective space illusion with its entire richness of pictorial possibilities, he (the artist) had to base his form problems on the fundamental facts of canvas and paint: "Paint as a means of illusion distanced us from our bodily togetherness with the painting..." From now on the point of departure for the painter is a new spatiality, since: "....he is not any more a 'subject' that possesses also eyes and sees with these eyes perspective space in front of him, but a human being with the consciousness of his own bodily existence, which not only has a body, but is also body." It suffices to mention here, without entering into further details, that this new relationship artist/painting has far reaching implications for the relation between the painting and its physical surroundings, because: " We stand in front of a radical contrast with the last great stylistic period (in architecture), the Baroque, in which architecture completed itself beyond the sculptural and dynamic elements into the perspective pseudo spaces of painting." By now 'free painting' creates its own monumentality, 'free painting' is monumental in itself, because what it instills as color space and movement, never breaks out of the clear spaces created by the architect. So far Hans Redeker.

== Summary of Stahl's art ==
In his concluding paragraph he summarises the characteristics of Stahl's art as follows; "Monumentality and expression are not reserved for the extroverted (artists) only, and Stahl is clearly introverted, a contemplated and matured artist, with sensitive vibrating sensibility, whose poesie begins to sound, when given silence. These works breath life and are filled with life, a mindful life, an undisturbed balance between components of the soul and heart. A 'monologue interieur' that, through the power of the artist, has become a 'monologue monumental' that speaks to us from these walls.

- Stahl is represented with over 70 works in the State Collections of Hessen (Staatliche Kunstsammlungen Hessens ) in Kassel.
- His collection is permanently presented in the Koehnline Museum of Art located in Des Plaines campus of Oakton Community College.
