= Evelyn Temple Emmett =

Australian tourist executive

- Born: 18 May 1871; Launceston, Tasmania, Australia
- Died: 9 December 1970 (aged 99); Hobart
- Occupations: Tourist director, bushwalker and writer in Australia
- Spouse: Sophie Margaret Maguire
- Parent(s): Skelton Buckley Emmett and Maria Evelyn née Smith

Evelyn Temple Emmett OBE (1871–1970) was the first Director of the Tasmanian Government Tourist Bureau, a member of the National-park Board in Tasmania, a foundation member of the Ski Club of Tasmania (formed in 1926) and a founder of the Hobart Walking Club (formed in 1929). He actively promoted skiing and bushwalking in the state and served on several National Park boards. Several Tasmanian features are named after him.

== Family ==
Evelyn Temple Emmett was born in Launceston, Tasmania on 18 May 1871 and grew up on the farm of his father, Skelton Emmett, in the village of Forest, within sight of The Nut at Stanley in Tasmania's north-west. His father was a pioneer farmer, prospector and track-cutter, a colourful and multi-faceted personality. His grandfather, Henry James Emmett, brought his young family out to Van Diemen's Land from England, arriving on 10 December 1819, only fifteen years after the establishment of Hobart Town.

E. T. Emmett's early schooling was at Stanley, though he later attended Scotch College, Launceston. In his youth Emmett excelled in road races and walking matches, and later became a champion cyclist and an accomplished ballroom dancer.

On 14 April 1903 he married Sophie Margaret Maguire at St Paul's Church of England, Stanley; they had three sons and three daughters.

== Early career ==
On completing his education he worked at Scotch College, Launceston as a teacher for a brief period, before accepting the position of Junior Clerk with the Tasmanian Main Line Railway Company in 1888. When the Tasmanian Government took over the railways a few years later, Emmett was promoted to the position of Chief Clerk.

== Tasmanian Government Tourist Bureau ==
Emmett was chosen in 1914 to oversee the beginnings of the company's tourism operation. This led to his appointment as first Director of the newly formed Tasmanian Government Tourist Bureau. Emmett had grown up in the Tasmanian bush, felt a close affinity with it and drew on his bush experiences throughout his life.

During the early years of his directorship, Tasmania's tourism industry was still developing and had limited funding. Emmett used his knowledge of Tasmania to assess the state's potential as a tourist destination and contributed to the development of its tourism promotion activities. When tourist numbers declined, he undertook promotional tours of mainland Australia, where he used lantern-slide presentations and public lectures to introduce Tasmania to prospective visitors. These presentations attracted audiences in Tasmania and mainland Australia.

In 1918 Emmett was deputy director of the committee which hosted a French mission to Tasmania. In recognition of his work the French government conferred upon him the Palmes d'Officier d'Académie (Ordre des Palmes Académiques) in 1923.

== Conservationist ==
Over the next three decades Emmett was at the forefront of a series of far-sighted initiatives to ensure the protection of many of today's wilderness regions. He became a foundation member of the Scenery Preservation Board (forerunner of National Parks and Wildlife Service) in 1915, and, two years later, of the first National Park Board which administered the Mount Field National Park and the Cradle Mountain-Lake St Clair National Park in their early years. In 1921, Emmett, Clive Lord and Gustav Weindorfer drew up a landmark proposal for a new national park to be established, in the first instance, at Cradle Mountain. Further discussion between the three men resulted in the now-historic proclamation of a Scenic Reserve on 16 May 1922 which extended south as far as Lake St Clair and enclosed, at that time, 158,000 acres (640 km^{2}). This became known as the Cradle Mountain-Lake St Clair National Park.

The year before Emmett had visited the mainland states to gain ideas for promoting tourism, and was impressed by the new sport of snow skiing. He returned with six pairs of skis and helped introduce the sport to southern Tasmania at Mount Field National Park in the winter of 1922. In 1929, with Fred Smithies and Carl Stackhouse, he was among the first to test the ski slopes of Ben Lomond in Northern Tasmania, along with Geoffrey Chapman who also skied Ben Lomond the same year. Emmett helped organise and participated regularly in weekend ski trips by rail from Hobart to Mount Field which quickly became very popular.

== Hobart Walking Club ==
On the return train trip from Mount Field on the last ski trip of the 1929 season Emmett suggested the idea of forming what would later become The Hobart Walking Club. He was supported by another keen skier and bushwalker, Jack Thwaites.

Emmett's casual suggestion on the train returning from Mount Field was received with such enthusiasm that shortly afterwards a notice was placed in The Mercury calling for interested persons to attend a meeting at Hobart Town Hall. Forty people, including the skiers from Mount Field, were present on Tuesday, 12 November 1929 when the Hobart Walking Club was formed. Walter Taylor was elected first President, Jack Thwaites, Secretary, and Cecil Johnston, Treasurer. Enthusiasm for the club ran high and nine days later the first general meeting was held. At this meeting rules were adopted and seventeen foundation members paid their subscriptions, nearly half of whom were women.

Among the foundation members were Emmett and Jack Thwaites, Walter Taylor, Geoffrey Chapman (who later designed the club's badge) and Alfred White. In the weeks ahead membership continued to grow and on Saturday 30 November 1929 the first club walk on Mount Wellington was organized. It was a highly successful outing with thirty-five members, mostly women, walking from Cascades to the Log Cabin (later replaced by the Rock Cabin). Among them were Jack Thwaites and Emmett, who was known variously to club members as 'E.T', 'Em', or, more respectfully, Mr Emmett. Between them, Emmett and Jack Thwaites laid the foundations for what would become one of Australia's most popular and important walking clubs.

== Pioneering walks ==
In December 1930 Emmett joined a party which made the first ascent of Mount Ida on the eastern shore of Lake St Clair. He also named Lake Oenone and Lake Helen on the upper reaches of neighbouring Mount Olympus. In March 1934 he made an early ascent of Frenchmans Cap with Jack Thwaites and Des Giblin, an expedition he describes colourfully in a Walkabout article;

"In the wild western fastnesses of Tasmania, "the most mountainous island in the world", stands Frenchman's Cap. No one knows who named it, nor who first saw it. It is the only mountain in Tasmania with a solid summit of white quartzite —or marble. Tasmania has been settled for 132 years. It is only about 180 miles long, and about the same in width in the broadest part; yet hundreds of square miles are still labelled "unexplored. There are several rivers of a hundred miles long upon whose banks there is no population whatever, and there is one whole county where the census-taker would have to write the word "nil." The Frenchman's Cap rears his glistening white head 4,721 feet into the sky in an area that is No Man's Land. Recently, with two companions, I climbed the Frenchman. It was the quickest trip done so far, occupying only five and a half days from Hobart and back."

Lake Sophie, nestled below the mountain's southern face, was named on that trip by Jack Thwaites after Emmett's wife. In the early 1930s plans were put in place to build a vehicular road from The Springs to the summit of Mount Wellington, a proposal which met with considerable opposition. Emmett pushed strongly for the construction of the Pinnacle Road, despite his love of bushwalking and harbouring a lifelong contempt for the motor car. 'Dad's opinion was that not everybody was capable of walking to the pinnacle,' his daughter, Margaret, remembered. 'He believed that the majestic view from the summit should be shared by car owners as well as walkers.'

== Writer ==
The Hobart Walking Club's biannual magazine, The Tasmanian Tramp, first published in 1933, was launched with funding assistance from the Tasmanian Government Tourist Bureau arranged by Emmett. He was editor and author of many articles for the first four issues and supplied the bulk of the photographs. A prolific and gifted writer, he also published in other magazines including Walkabout and authored two books, A Short History of Tasmania and Tasmania By Road and Track.

== Legacy ==
After a long and distinguished career Emmett retired as Director of Tourism in June 1941. In 1959 he was appointed to the Order of the British Empire (OBE). He has since been called 'The Father of Tasmanian Tourism'. Today his name is commemorated in three locations: Mount Emmett in the Cradle Mountain-Lake St Clair National Park, Lake Emmett in Mount Field National Park and Emmetts Chamber in King Solomons Cave at Mole Creek.

When Emmett died in Hobart on 9 December 1970 in his hundredth year, tourism in Tasmania was a growing industry behind which he had been a driving force. The opening up of wilderness Tasmania to the bushwalking community had been an important part of that development, and from the beginning Emmett fought hard for the preservation of the state's natural regions at a time when the short-sighted plundering of these was often the primary consideration of business and government.

== Publications ==
He wrote a number of books and articles, including under the pseudonyms 'Orion' and 'Ah Won'.

- Emmett, E. T. (Evelyn Temple); Nuttall, Charles, 1872–1934; Tasmania. Government Tourist Dept (1913), Tommy's trip to Tasmania (5th ed.), Tasmanian Government Tourist Dept
- Emmett, E. T. (Evelyn Temple) (1937), A short history of Tasmania, Angus & Robertson
- Emmett, E. T. (Evelyn Temple) (1954), Tasmania by road and track (3rd ed.), Melbourne University Press
- Emmett, E. T. (Evelyn Temple) (1931), The beauty of Tasmania's lake country, Weekly Courier
- Emmett, E. T. (Evelyn Temple) (October 2018), Van Diemen's Land: Hell in Heaven, Australian Self-Publishing Group

== Notable achievements ==
- First director of the Tasmanian Government Tourist Bureau.
- Instrumental in introducing the sport of skiing to southern Tasmania in 1922.
- Suggested and founded Hobart Walking Club with Jack Thwaites in 1929.
- Member of the party which made the first ascent of Mount Ida overlooking Lake St Clair in December 1930.
- Led the party which made the first official crossing of the Overland Track in January 1931.
- Pushed strongly for the conservation of Tasmania's wilderness and historic areas through his work on National Park boards and the Scenery Preservation Board.

== See also ==
- Jack Thwaites

== Further Information ==
- Alexander, Alison (ed.), 'Evelyn Temple Emmett', The Companion to Tasmanian History, University of Tasmania, Hobart, 2004
- Thwaites, Jack, 'Club Founder – E.T. Emmett', The Tasmanian Tramp, No. 9, 1949, pp. 9–10
- Thwaites, Jack, 'Evelyn Temple Emmett, 1871–1970', The Tasmanian Tramp, No. 20, 1972, pp. 20–22
- The Tasmanian Tramp, Nos. 1–20, 1933–72
- Kleinig, Simon, Jack Thwaites – Pioneer Tasmanian Bushwalker and Conservationist, Forty Degrees South Pty Ltd, Hobart, 2008
