= Thwaite (surname) =

Thwaite is an English surname. Notable people with this surname include the following:

- Ann Thwaite (born 1932), British biographer
- Anthony Thwaite (1930–2021), English poet and writer
- Bruce Thwaite (1923–1991), Australian paralympic competitor
- Mark Thwaite (born 1965), English guitarist
- Michael Thwaite (born 1983), Australian soccer player
- Paul Thwaite (born 1971), British banker

== See also ==
- Thwaites (surname)
