= Thwaits (surname) =

Thwaits is a surname. Notable people with the surname include:

- Emily Jane Thwaits (1860–1906), South African botanical illustrator
- Robert Thwaits (15th century), English academic administrator
- Steytler Thwaits (1911–1980), South African cricketer

== See also ==
- Thwaites (surname)
