= Scotch Oakburn College =

Location
- Launceston, Tasmania; Australia; 41°26′57.4″S 147°10′07.5″E

Information
- Type: Independent, co-educational, day and boarding
- Motto: Latin: Ad Superiora Viam Inveniam (I will find a way to higher things.)
- Denomination: in association with the Uniting Church
- Established: 1886 (MLC); 1901 (Scotch); 1979 (Amalgamation)
- Chairperson: David Finnigan
- Principal: Ross Patterson
- Enrolment: ~1,100 (ELC–12)
- Colours: Maroon, blue and gold
- Slogan: Creating the future
- Affiliation: Sports Association of Tasmanian Independent Schools
- Website: www.soc.tas.edu.au

Scotch Oakburn College is an independent, open-entry, Early Learning to Year 12, coeducational, day and boarding school in Launceston, Tasmania, in association with the Uniting Church in Australia.

Although founded in 1886, the present school was established in 1979 with the amalgamation of the historically boys' Scotch College and girls' Oakburn College (formerly the Methodist Ladies' College, based in East Launceston). The school currently caters for approximately 1,100 students from Early Learning (3 years old) to Year 12 (18 years old), including more than 70 boarders from Years 6 to 12.

Scotch Oakburn is affiliated with the Association of Heads of Independent Schools of Australia (AHISA), the Junior School Heads Association of Australia (JSHAA), the Australian Boarding Schools' Association, and the Sports Association of Tasmanian Independent Schools.

The College is a full member of the Round Square association, an international association spreading across five continents and over 100 schools around the world. Scotch Oakburn College is the first member of Round Square in Tasmania.

== History ==
=== Formation ===
Scotch Oakburn College was created in 1979, through the amalgamation of the Scotch College and Oakburn College (formerly the Methodist Ladies' College).

=== Methodist Ladies' College ===
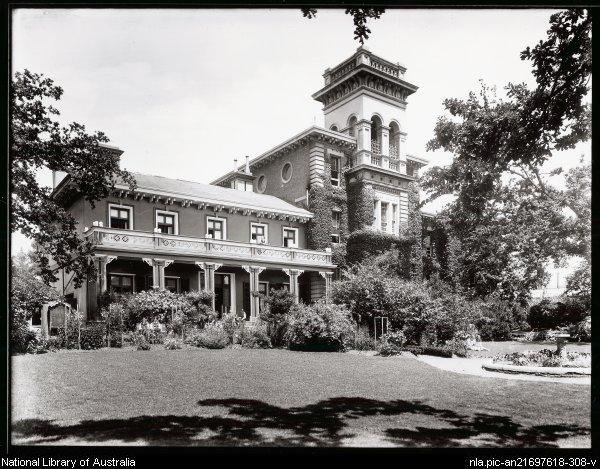
The Methodist Ladies' College, Launceston, c1906–1930

The Methodist Ladies' College, Launceston (M.L.C) was established on Elphin Road, just east of the city centre, in 1886. The aim of the college was to allow girls the same access to educational facilities as boys. The largest building on campus had been named "Oakburn" upon its construction 25 years earlier. After its first year, it had 88 students. The first Headmaster was G. Thornton-Lewis.

In 1969, M.L.C was renamed "Oakburn College" as the school council felt that 'Ladies' was outdated. The school became co–educational in 1973.

=== Scotch College ===
The Scotch College was established as a non-denominational boys' school, on York Street in the Launceston CBD in 1901. The school went through a number of owners in its first 50 years of existence, eventually being taken over by the Presbyterian Church of Australia in October 1950. In 1917, it moved from its York Street residence to the "Ravenscraig" property on Penquite Road, Newstead, around 10 km east of the city.

By 1972 the College was struggling to survive and it was subsequently decided to introduce co–education.

=== Church union and amalgamation ===
After the formation of the Uniting Church in Australia in 1977, representatives from both colleges joined to discuss an amalgamation. The successful amalgamation process was chaired by local physician John Morris, AO, MBE, who was then Chairman of the Oakburn College Council. 1979 was the inaugural year of Scotch Oakburn College with the Oakburn College Council Chairman becoming the Chairman of the amalgamated college's Council, and the Principal of Scotch College becoming the inaugural Principal of the amalgamated College.

The former Oakburn College campus, on Elphin Road, in 1979 became home to the Matriculation classes (years 11 and 12) and the junior school (years K–5) and boarding house. The same year, the Scotch College campus on Penquite Road became the middle school (years 6 to 10). In 1980, the current set-up was adopted with years 11 and 12 joining the middle school classes at the Penquite Campus, leaving the Elphin Campus with Early Learning to Year 5 and the boarding house.

It now operates in association with the Uniting Church in Australia but is not governed or managed by the Church.

== Principals ==
Years	Methodist Ladies' College, later Oakburn College
1886–1889	George Thornton Lewis, BA (London)
1890–1902	Francis J. Nance, MA
1903–1941	Mary E.G. Fox, MBE, MA
1941–1954	Gwendoline Madder, MA, DipEd, Acting Head 1926–1928, 1936
1954–1962	C.O. Leigh Cook, MA
1963–1971	C. Leigh Speedy, MSc, BD, DipEd, MACE
1972–1976	Angas S. Holmes, BA, BD, MRE, DipEd, MACE
1977–1978	Alan E. Green, BSc, BD, DipEd, MACE
Years	Scotch College
1900–1901	S. Leslie Brown, MA
1902–1914	Andrew Raeburn, MA
1914–1924	C. Mitchell Tovell, MSc
1925–1950	W.W.V. Briggs, MBE, MA, DipEd, Vice Principal 1951–1956
1950–1966	Robert H. Dean, BA, BEd, MACE
1966–1971	John T. Sykes, BA (Hons), BEd, MACE, JP
1972–1977	Jock P. Herbert, BA DipEd, FRGS, MACE
1978–1979	Bruce N. Carter, BA, EdM, EdD, MACE
Years	Scotch Oakburn College
1979–1985	Bruce N. Carter, AM, BA, EdM, EdD, MACE
1979–1981	Alan E. Green, Associate Principal of Scotch Oakburn College
1986–1993	David J. Hone, BA (Hons), CertEd, MEd, MACE
1994–2001	Graeme E. McDonald, BA, DipEd, MEdAdmin, MACE, MACEA
2002–2012	Andrew Barr, BEc (Hons), DipEd, MEd, MACEL, MACE
2013–2023	Andy Muller, BAppSc, DipEd, GradDipEdAdmin, MEd
2024–present	Ross Patterson, BSc (Biological Science), GradDipEd, MACE, MACEL

== Campuses ==
=== Elphin ===
The younger of the two campuses, the Elphin Campus is the site of the more historic buildings in the school. The campus features a number of beautiful old oak trees which are located at the front of the campus in a garden area. The Elphin Campus is home to the Junior School / primary school (Early Learning to Year 5) and boarding house. The first building on the land was "Oakburn", constructed by Eliza Thomson in 1861, a year after she was granted the land. This is the most historic building on any of the campuses. In time, "Oakburn" would become the boarding house. The college was later renamed for this building. An extension to this building, the Mary Fox Jubilee Wing, was constructed in 1935 to celebrate the College's jubilee anniversary. Today it is better known to students as the Mary Fox Hall or just the Mary Fox and it houses school assemblies, chapel services and many other events such as school plays, dances and trivia nights.

The stately "Lemana" and "The Stables" are located on the western end of the campus. "The Stables", as the name suggests, was formerly the stable area for horses. Lemana is a grand old house which keeps its historic exterior. The Mary Fox Performing Arts Centre is a dual-purpose space and is the centre of many school community events.

The Early Learning centre is home to pre-school, kindergarten, and after-hours care facilities. The centre was built on the site of the original Methodist Ladies' College/Oakburn College Principal's residence.

The Elphin campus also is home to four tennis courts, a large oval, two multi-purpose courts, a gymnasium and a 25 m swimming pool.

=== Penquite ===
The Penquite Campus is situated on both sides of Penquite Road in Newstead, linked by an underpass. The main side of the campus or Eastern side features a large, rectangular, grassy field in the centre, with buildings located around the outside of it. The major buildings of the school are named after and in honour of significant people and places in the school's heritage. Over the years these buildings have been upgraded and redeveloped and more buildings have been built. Directly inside the main entrance to the College lies a large, old oak tree which lies beside the school Chapel.

- "Ravenscraig", named after the original name of the Penquite Road property, refers to the oldest classroom block on the campus. Formerly housing senior staff and administrative offices, this area now houses learning spaces.
- Briggs House is located on the eastern end of the campus. First constructed in 1954, this building was for boarding students of Scotch College. It is named for long serving headmaster W.V.V. Briggs. Upon amalgamation, the building began to be used for social sciences classrooms, and the kitchen area became the food technology area. Today the kitchen continues to be used for classes and the remainder of the building houses staff.
- The Robert Dean Senior Student Centre (formally known as the Robert Dean Centre, or just Dean Centre to students, was the campus gymnasium; it featured one multi-purpose sports court with a gym/weights area on an upstairs mezzanine floor. The Robert Dean Centre also housed school assemblies weekly) is one of the campus' largest buildings. Named after former Scotch College Headmaster, Robert Dean, this building was redeveloped and reopened in March 2007, as a state of the art purpose-built study centre for Year 11 and Year 12 Tasmanian Certificate of Education students, including study areas, computing laboratories, learning spaces, a fully functioning student kitchen and relaxation area. Housed beneath are the Design and Technology, and Art departments. It is visible in the centre of the campus behind the field and between the John Morris Library and Bruce Carter Administration building.
- Saint Andrews, named after the patron saint of Scotland, is located on the western side of the campus. The building was refurbished internally in 2017 with the construction of the adjoining Helix building. The tuckshop is located in this area which provides a variety of healthy food options for students at both recess and lunch times.
- Helix was opened in 2017 and is the Centre for Science and Mathematics and home for Years 9 and 10, on the Penquite Campus. This latest development continues the prudent investment by the College over the past decade to ensure it can provide contemporary learning spaces to complement our C21 Teaching and Learning. Helix houses four science laboratories and five new rooms.
- The Health and Physical Education Centre opened in August 2007 features international standard basketball, netball, badminton and volleyball courts, two multi-purpose learning studios, and a weights and ergonomics room.

The Penquite Campus has seen a lot of building development since amalgamation:

- The John Morris Centre (formerly the John Morris Library), named after the inaugural Chairman of the amalgamated College Council (now the Board of Management) was constructed in the late 1980s and refurbished in 2015.
- The Bruce Carter Administration Building, named after the inaugural Principal of the amalgamated College, replaced the former administration facilities in Ravenscraig in the early 1990s.
- The Horton Auditorium/Performing Arts Centre, opened in 2003, which includes an auditorium and performing arts facilities. The auditorium is named after the nineteenth century boys' school, Horton College, near Ross in the Tasmanian Midlands, which was the first Methodist College in Australia.
- The Middle School, which is situated on the opposite side of Penquite Road to the main campus (next to the Heath and Physical Education Centre), opened in early 2009 and features new facilities for students in grades 6 to 8. This side of the campus is connected via a tunnel which extends to the main Penquite facilities.
- Helix, the Centre for Science and Mathematics and home to Year 9 and 10 students, opened in 2017.

=== Valley ===
In 2005, Scotch Oakburn came to an arrangement with the owner of 'Rostrevor', near Fingal, to lease and use a part the property for outdoor education and environmental study purposes. This facility is known as the Valley Campus. The Valley Campus is home to the College Education Outdoors and Sustainability program.

== Sport ==
Scotch Oakburn College is a member of the Sports Association of Tasmanian Independent Schools (SATIS).

=== SATIS premierships ===
Scotch Oakburn College has won the following SATIS premierships.

Combined:

- Athletics (13) – 1995, 1997, 2001, 2002, 2003, 2004, 2005, 2006, 2007, 2009, 2010, 2011, 2021
- Swimming – 2021, 2022, 2023

Boys:

- Athletics (6) – 1991, 1996, 2000, 2001, 2002, 2003
- Basketball (3) – 2016, 2017, 2020
- Cricket (10) – 1929, 1930, 1931, 1936, 1968, 1970, 1974, 2013, 2015, 2016
- Cricket T20 – 2018
- Football (4) – 1967, 2005, 2018, 2019
- Hockey (2) – 1997, 1999
- Rowing (3) – 1996, 1998, 2003
- Rowing Eight (10) – 1948, 1973, 1974, 1987, 1994, 1996, 1997, 2007, 2013, 2018
- Swimming - 2023
- Tennis (16) – 1966, 1967, 1968, 1972, 1973, 1983, 1995, 2000, 2001, 2006, 2007, 2008, 2009, 2010, 2011, 2019

Girls:

- Athletics (7) – 1984, 1985, 2004, 2007, 2009, 2010, 2021
- Cricket T20 - 2023
- Football – 2019
- Hockey (4) – 1992, 1994, 1995, 1997
- Netball (4) – 2012, 2013, 2014, 2015
- Rowing – 2005
- Rowing Eight (2) – 1997, 2021
- Softball (6) – 1988, 2010, 2011, 2012, 2013, 2014
- Swimming (4) – 1985, 1986, 1987, 2021, 2022, 2023
- Tennis (14) – 1979, 1988, 1989, 1990, 1997, 1998, 1999, 2000, 2001, 2002, 2009, 2010, 2011, 2012

== Notable alumni ==
Alumni of the Scotch Oakburn College (and its predecessors) are known as Old Collegians, and may elect to join the schools alumni association, the Scotch Oakburn Old Collegians Association (SOOCA). Some notable Old Collegians include:

Academic

- Alan Stretton – academic and Rhodes Scholar

Business

- Sir Edgar Coles – former Managing Director of Coles Supermarkets

Entertainment, media and the arts

- Stuart Coupe – music journalist, author, band manager, promoter, publicist, broadcaster and music label founder.
- Roger Scholes – film director
- Robbie Arnott - Author
- Chloe Wilson - Singer, musician, lead singer of Sumner (duo)

Government, politics and the law

- David Bushby – Senator for Tasmania
- Enid Campbell AO, OBE – legal scholar, first Australian female professor and law school dean
- Evelyn Temple Emmett OBE – first Director of the Tasmanian Government Tourist Bureau
- John Watson – former Senator for Tasmania
- Don Wing – former lawyer, politician and President of the Tasmanian Legislative Council

Military

- Alec Campbell – Australia's last ANZAC soldier

Sport

- Marcos Ambrose – V8 Supercar champion; NASCAR Driver
- Brent Crosswell – AFL footballer
- Michael Grenda – Olympic Cycling Gold Medalist
- Mia King – AFLW player North Melbourne
- Benji McDermott - AFL player collingwood
- Meg Phillips – WNCL and WBBL cricketer

== See also ==
- List of schools in Tasmania
- List of boarding schools
- Education in Tasmania
