= GoatMan: How I Took a Holiday from Being Human =

Non-fiction book by Thomas Thwaites

- Author: Thomas Thwaites
- Publisher: Princeton Architectural Press
- Publication date: 17 May 2016
- Pages: 207
- ISBN: 978-1-61689-405-4

GoatMan: How I Took a Holiday from Being Human is a 2016 book by Thomas Thwaites. It was published by Princeton Architectural Press. It describes a project in which the author attempted to live as a goat in the Swiss mountains for several days, with prosthetic limbs and an artificial stomach.

The book includes photographs of the author dressed as a goat at various locations.

== Reception ==
New Statesman called it an "original, engaging and rather quirky book."

Kirkus Reviews called it "A quirkily entertaining exploration of what it means to be human and what it might be like to be a goat."

Thwaites was awarded the 2016 Ig Nobel Prize in the biology category (jointly, with Charles Foster).
