= Frenchmans Cap National Park =

Former national park in Tasmania, Australia

Frenchmans Cap National Park was a Tasmanian national park that used the course of the Franklin River around the lower reaches of Frenchmans Cap and adjacent mountains and ridges as its boundary between 1941 and the 1990s.

Despite status as a national park, the geological and geographical features of the park were always of interest.

The National park creation preceded the Franklin Dam controversy, and is now a component part of the Franklin-Gordon Wild Rivers National Park.
