= Norbert Kricke =

German sculptor (1922–1984)

Norbert Kricke (30 November 1922 – 28 June 1984) was a German sculptor.

Born in Düsseldorf, Kricke was a student of Richard Scheibe and Hans Uhlmann at the Hochschule für Bildende Künste in Berlin. He started creating abstract sculptures from 1947, using wires and other materials associated with industry, such as steel, glass and concrete. He was one of the most important artists in the group known as L'Art Informel, and had close links with ZERO and nouveau réalisme. From 1959 he worked with Yves Klein and Werner Ruhnau, and after 1972 he taught at the Kunstakademie Düsseldorf, where he died.

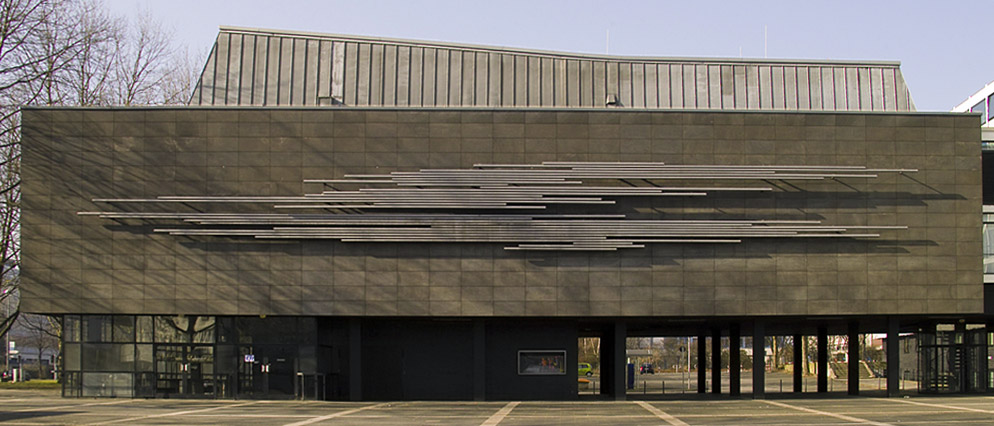
Röhrendickicht

One of his more famous works is the Röhrendickicht (thicket of pipes, 1957) outside the Gelsenkirchen opera house Musiktheater im Revier. He also created wire sculptures for Theater Münster (1955/56) and fountains for the University of Baghdad. He is generally known for his theories on the use of flowing water in art, shared with the critic John Anthony Thwaites (1909–1981).

== Selected exhibitions ==
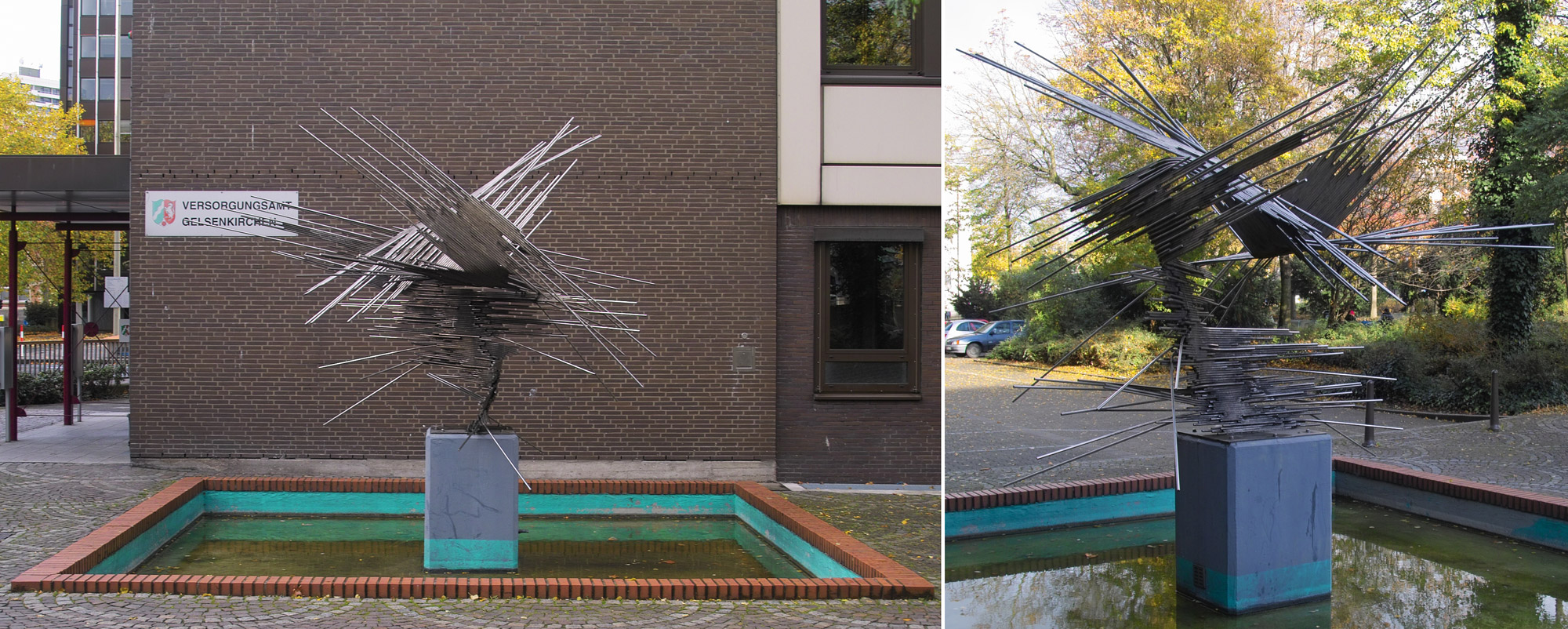
Steelplastic (1959?), Gelsenkirchen

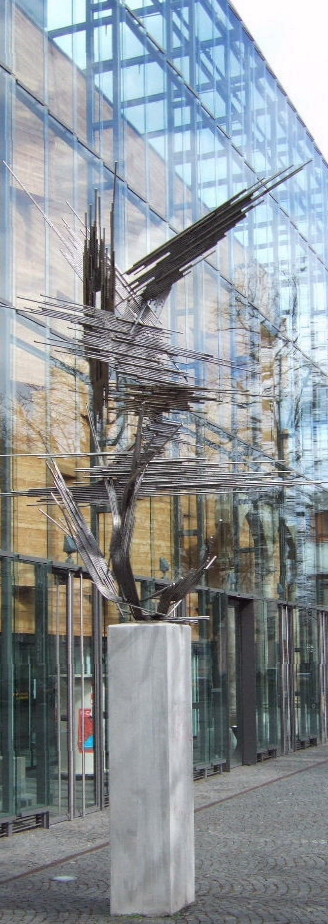
Kräftebündel (1967), Rheinisches Landesmuseum Bonn

- 1959 II. documenta, Kassel
- 1964 32nd Venice Biennale, 1964
- 1964 documenta III, Kassel
- 1975 Norbert Kricke, Kunsthalle Düsseldorf
- 1980 Norbert Kricke, Josef Albers Museum, Bottrop
- 1997 Deutschlandbilder, Martin-Gropius-Bau, Berlin
- 1998 Norbert Kricke, Studio A. Otterndorf
- 1999 Das Deutsche Informel, Galerie Rothe, Frankfurt
- 1999 Norbert Kricke, Museum of Contemporary Art, Skopje
- 2000 40 Jahre Orangerie-Reinz, Galerie Orangerie-Reinz, Köln
- 2001 Outside the network?, Edith Wahlandt Galerie, Stuttgart
- 2003 Gruppe 53, Museum der Stadt Ratingen
- 2003 The Spirit of White, Galerie Beyeler, Basel
- 2004 Auf Papier, Galerie Neher, Essen
- 2005 Multiple Räume (2): Park, Kunsthalle Baden-Baden
- 2006 Classical : Modern, Daimler Chrysler Contemporary, Berlin
- 2006 Full House, Kunsthalle Mannheim
- 2006 Rupprecht Geiger / Norbert Kricke, Neues Museum Weimar
- 2006 VIP III. Arena der Abstraktion, Museum Morsbroich, Leverkusen
- 2006 Was ist Plastik? 100 Jahre – 100 Köpfe, Wilhelm Lehmbruck Museum, Duisburg
- 2006–2007 Norbert Kricke Museum, Kunst Palast, Düsseldorf

== Works in collections ==
- Daimler Chrysler Contemporary, Berlin
- Karl Ernst Osthaus-Museum, Hagen
- Kunst aus NRW, Aachen-Kornelimünster
- Museum Abteiberg, Mönchengladbach
- Saarland Museum, Saarbrücken
- Situation Kunst Bochum
- Studio A Otterndorf
