= Bruce Carter (educator) =

Bruce Northleigh Carter AM (born 1939 Sydney) is an Australian educator who was headmaster of Scotch Oakburn College and Cranbrook before becoming headmaster of the Emanuel School in 2001. He retired in late 2010 and was replaced by Anne Hastings.

== Education ==
Carter was educated at the Knox Grammar School, where he excelled in sports and was awarded with school colours in Cricket and Rugby Union and had been a member of the 1st IV Tennis team. He began teaching as an 18-year-old in his first year of tertiary studies at University of Sydney. He graduated with a Bachelor of Arts in English and continued to play cricket in Sydney. He was awarded a scholarship to study overseas where he obtained his Master of Education from Harvard University and his Doctorate in Education from the University of Toronto. The area of his Doctorate was the history and philosophy of education.

== Outline of career ==
While studying, Carter had teaching experience at the Knox Grammar School, Newington College and The King's School. In 1970 he was invited to return to the Knox Grammar School to oversee the creation and development of a new senior boarding house. In 1971 he was appointed Deputy Headmaster.

In 1978 he became the first principal of the amalgamated coeducational Scotch Oakburn College in Launceston. In mid 1985 he was appointed Headmaster of Cranbrook, a position he held for sixteen years. In 2001 Carter was appointed as the principal of the Emanuel School Retiring from Emanuel School in the end of 2010 he was replaced by Anne Hastings.

Carter is married with two children.
