= Emanuel School, Sydney =

Emanuel School

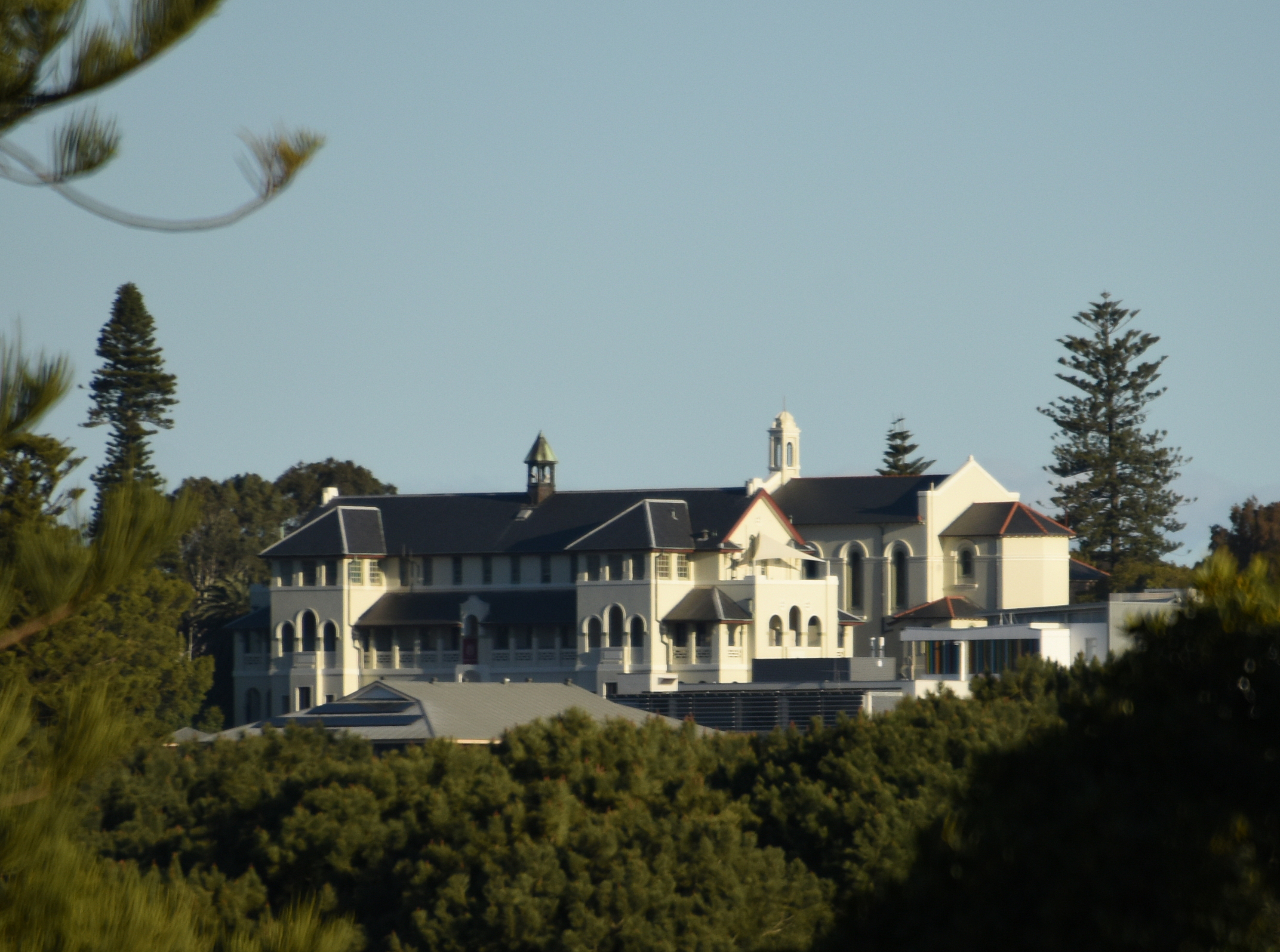
- Emanuel School viewed from Centennial Park in 2017

Location
- 20 Stanley Street; Randwick, New South Wales, 2031; Australia; 33°54′24″S 151°14′37″E

Information
- Type: Independent co-educational early learning, primary and secondary day school
- Motto: Mind, Spirit, Being
- Denomination: Jewish
- Established: 1983; 43 years ago
- Founder: Rabbi Brian Fox AM
- Educational authority: New South Wales Education Standards Authority
- President: David New
- Principal: Linda Emms
- Staff: 106
- Years: Early learning and K–12
- Enrolment: 912 (2022)
- Colours: Maroon and grey
- Website: www.emanuelschool.nsw.edu.au

New South Wales Heritage Register
- Type: State heritage (complex / group)
- Designated: 2 April 1999
- Reference no.: 386
- Type: School – Private
- Category: Education

Emanuel School is an independent Jewish co-educational early learning, primary and secondary day school, located on a heritage-listed campus in the Sydney eastern suburb of Randwick, in New South Wales, Australia. The school was founded in 1983 in Woollahra. The current Randwick site was purchased in 1984 and was opened in 1985. In 1986, Australian Prime Minister Bob Hawke officially opened the school. Emanuel School currently caters for approximately 920 students from Pre-school to Year 12. Since 2025, the school has been headed by Principal Linda Emms. The school is affiliated with the Jewish Communal Appeal, the Junior School Heads Association of Australia (JSHAA), and the Association of Heads of Independent Schools of Australia (AHISA).

The heritage-listed school site has previously served as a monastery, seminary and gentleman's private residence in past years. The site was designed by Edmund Blacket (Aston Lodge and now Saunders Administration Building) and built from 1864 to 1936. The school is located in the City of Randwick local government area. The site was added to the New South Wales State Heritage Register on 2 April 1999.

== School History ==
In 1982, under the leadership of Rabbi Brian Fox and with the support of many other members of Temple Emanuel Woollahra (now known as Emanuel Synagogue) and the wider Jewish community of Sydney, the idea of Emanuel School was born. On 2 February 1983 the first 53 students from Kindergarten to Year 6 were enrolled in rooms at Temple Emanuel. Later in 1983, Years 3 to 7 moved to an unused school in Watsons Bay, in the grounds of Our Lady Star of the Sea.

In 1984, with significant financial assistance and personal support from Mr Aron Kleinlehrer, together with communal generosity, Emanuel School purchased their present site in Randwick. The school opened its doors in 1985 with 230 students from Years K-8. Prime Minister Bob Hawke officially opened the school in 1986.

In 2001 the Emanuel School Board took on a new management plan, which included the appointment of a new school Principal – Dr Bruce Carter AM

4 years later in 2005, under the auspices of the NSW Jewish Communal Appeal, the Emanuel School ran a successful Capital Appeal which primarily aids in debt reduction and some property development.

In March 2011, the new Science "K" Block was opened, featuring 4 new laboratories, 2 preparation rooms, and 2 "dry" (non-laboratory) classrooms. It was funded partially by a federal government BER grant.

In 2013, to celebrate the schools 30th anniversary, a second capital appeal was held, raising money to construct the new LINC Building, which was intended to replace two existing demountable buildings (formerly called the D Block). This new building was opened in 2015, with new classrooms for Years 1–4, a theatre, a gym, purpose built Visual Arts classrooms and new playground areas. Nowadays, the High School library is also housed here, along with a small multipurpose classroom.

In 2016, the Old High School Art Block was refurbished into 2 Kindergarten Classrooms, and the entire art department, both Primary and High, were moved to the 3rd Floor purpose built Visual Arts Classrooms.

At the end of 2017, Anne Hasting retired from her position as principal of The Emanuel School. Succeeding Ms. Hasting in 2018, Andrew Watt served as the principal until the end of 2024 when he retired. Linda Emms has been the principal since.

In 2018, a new 'innovation' building was opened on the sight of the former High School library, which was moved to the LINC Building. The Innovation Building featured multiple new classrooms for the ICT and English Departments, a Food Tech Lab/Kitchen, a Design Lab, the "Imaginarium" (A special design lab that also served as a classroom for Primary School), and several offices for teachers.

Finally, in 2023, the new B'Yachad Y Block was opened on the sight of the former 2 floored Adler Building (Which used to house the Years 5 and 6 classrooms until 2022 and the Emanuel School Uniform Shop until 2020), which was demolished throughout the course of 2022. The B'Yachad Building possesses 7 standard classrooms, 3 breakout spaces, several break-rooms, and a new and upgraded "Imaginarium". The Years 5 and 6 classrooms (which had been temporarily housed in the High School B Block during the construction of the B'Yachad building) were moved to the 2nd and 3rd floors of the building, along with the Kindergarten classrooms, which were moved to the bottom floor. The old Kindergarten classrooms were soon refurbished into the new Primary School Library, while the old sight of the Primary School Library was transformed into a study area for Years 11s and 12s.

However, more changes have occurred since 2023. The leadership change of 2025 resulted in significant restructuring of the student lesson timetable, a highly controversial policy change which resulted in pushback by both students and parents, most notably through organised petitions. There have also been crackdowns on uniform and tardiness in the school, along with the introduction of the new Study Skills subject for Years 7-12.

== Site History ==
=== Indigenous Australian history ===
Pre-1780s local Aboriginal people in the area used the site for fishing and cultural activities – rock engravings, grinding grooves and middens remain in evidence. In 1789 Governor Arthur Phillip referred to "a long bay", which became known as Long Bay. Aboriginal people are believed to have inhabited the Sydney region for at least 20,000 years. The population of Aboriginal people between Palm Beach and Botany Bay in 1788 has been estimated to have been 1,500. Those living south of Port Jackson to Botany Bay were the Cadigal people who spoke Dharug, while the local clan name of Maroubra people was "Muru-ora-dial". By the mid nineteenth century the traditional owners of this land had typically either moved inland in search of food and shelter, or had died as the result of European disease or confrontation with British colonisers.

=== Colonial history ===
One of the earliest land grants in this area was made in 1824 to Captain Francis Marsh, who received 4.9 hectares (12 acres) bounded by the present Botany and High Streets, Alison and Belmore Roads. In 1839 William Newcombe acquired the land north-west of the present town hall in Avoca Street.

Randwick takes its name from the town of Randwick, Gloucestershire, England. The name was suggested by Simeon Pearce (1821–86) and his brother James. Simeon was born in the English Randwick and the brothers were responsible for the early development of both Randwick and its neighbour, Coogee. Simeon had come to the colony in 1841 as a 21 year old surveyor. He built his Blenheim House on the 1.6 hectares (4 acres) he bought from Marsh, and called his property "Randwick". The brothers bought and sold land profitably in the area and elsewhere. Simeon campaigned for construction of a road from the city to Coogee (achieved in 1853) and promoted the incorporation of the suburb. Pearce sought construction of a church modelled on the church of St. John in his birthplace. In 1857 the first St Jude's stood on the site of the present post office, at the corner of the present Alison Road and Avoca Street.

Randwick was slow to progress. The village was isolated from Sydney by swamps and sand hills, and although a horse-drawn omnibus was operated by a man named Grice from the late 1850s, the journey was more a test of nerves than a pleasure jaunt. Wind blew sand over the track, and the bus sometimes became bogged, so that passengers had to get out and push it free. From its early days Randwick had a divided society. The wealthy lived elegantly in large houses built when Pearce promoted Randwick and Coogee as a fashionable area. But the market gardens, orchards and piggeries that continued alongside the large estates were the lot of the working class. Even on the later estates that became racing empires, many jockeys and stable hands lived in huts or even under canvas. An even poorer group were the immigrants who existed on the periphery of Randwick in a place called Irishtown, in the area now known as The Spot, around the junction of St.Paul's Street and Perouse Road. Here families lived in makeshift houses, taking on the most menial tasks in their struggle to survive.

In 1858 when the NSW Government passed the Municipalities Act, enabling formation of municipal districts empowered to collect rates and borrow money to improve their suburb, Randwick was the first suburb to apply for the status of a municipality. It was approved in February 1859, and its first Council was elected in March 1859.

Randwick had been the venue for sporting events, as well as duels and illegal sports, from the early days in the colony's history. Its first racecourse, the Sandy Racecourse or Old Sand Track, had been a hazardous track over hills and gullies since 1860. When a move was made in 1863 by John Tait, to establish Randwick Racecourse, Simeon Pearce was furious, especially when he heard that Tait also intended to move into Byron Lodge. Tait's venture prospered, however and he became the first person in Australia to organise racing as a commercial sport. The racecourse made a big difference to the progress of Randwick. The omnibus gave way to trams that linked the suburb to Sydney and civilisation. Randwick soon became a prosperous and lively place, and it still retains a busy residential, professional and commercial life.

Today, some of the houses have been replaced by home units. Many European migrants have made their homes in the area, along with students and workers at the nearby University of New South Wales and the Prince of Wales Hospital.

=== Aston Lodge estate ===
==== Gentleman's Estate (1862–1901) ====
The area of land which subsequently was developed into the Aston Lodge Estate was offered for sale by the NSW Government in August 1862. The Crown land, released for sale under the recently enacted Crown Lands Alienation Act, 1861, offered a total of 18 lots. The public auction was undertaken by Messrs W. Dean and Co. of Pitt and O'Connell Streets.

Lots 1, 2, 11, part 3 and part 10 of Section 8 (being a total of 11 acres which formed the Aston Estate) was purchased by John Watkins. Watkins also purchased another 12 acres of land to the east in the block bounded by present-day Carrington Road, Hooper Street, Bella Lane and Darley Road, it adjoins Queens Park.

The Torrens Title land title deed for the 11 acres was registered by the Registrar General and issued to John Watkins in August 1864. The Crown grant included a Building Covenant to the effect that "only one residence with the necessary out-buildings shall be erected on the said land.." This Restriction was rescinded in May 1899.

Watkins is known to have engaged the architect Edmund Thomas Blacket to design the extant double storey, sandstone built, suburban villa known as Aston Lodge. A tender for a dwelling house in Randwick was placed by Edmund Blacket in The Sydney Morning Herald on 20 May 1863 which may relate to Watkins house. Blacket was born in England in 1817. Blacket's professional training included a period as railway surveyor. He had a considerable interest in English medieval architecture, which later provided Blacket with the intellectual background for his work in Australia in the Gothic Revival style.

Blacket arrived in Sydney in November 1842. For the first seven years in the colony he was largely preoccupied with church and school commissions. In December 1849 he succeeded Mortimer Lewis as the Colonial Architect of New South Wales (which at that time was also responsible for what is now Queensland). He resigned from this position in September, 1854. During this period Blacket was responsible for a number of varied, but small scale projects. Back in private practice he produced a variety of residential, ecclesiastical and commercial works. He died in 1883.

The first entry for Watkins residency at Aston Lodge is 1865.5 John Watkins was born in Monmouth, Wales on 22 May 1811. It is believed Watkins came to Australia in 1843 and initially resided in Tasmania. He married Ann Watkins in 1847 in Hobart, and the couple had two children – John Leo (1849) and Aston James (1852), but there may have been others as the published genealogies of this family are often contradictory in their detail giving different places of marriage, birth, etc. He was a Catholic.

The Watkins family came to Sydney in 1853. By the time of residency at Randwick he was in partnership with James M. Leigh trading as Watkins and Leigh, importing merchants with premises in George Street, and a bonded store in Phillip Street. Watkins residency of Aston Lodge was for the years 1865–1867, 1871-1875 (the house appears to have been left vacant through all or part 1876), and from 1877 until his death in 1884 (on 21 April at the age of 74 years). Mrs John Watkins continued to reside in the house until 1887.

During his life Watkins served as an alderman of Randwick Council for the years 1874- 1880 (being the alderman for West Ward (which included Aston Lodge) for 1875–1880) and as mayor for the terms 1870–1872, and 1884. He was also a board member of the Society for Relief of Destitute Children.

For the interims of Watkins non-residency the house was tenanted as follows:- 1868 to c.1871 by, Walter Bradley (1836-1893). Bradley's tenure is believed to have occurred due to the building of his own residence at this time, Sunnyside, also situated in Randwick. For the latter half of this period (1870-1871) he served as mayor of Randwick Council. Bradley arrived in Sydney in the mid-1850s, and established a large auctioneering house which later traded as Bradley Newton Lamb. Apart from his commercial interests (which included the noted coaching company Cobb & Co), Bradley was instrumental in establishing a number of ornithological societies and the Sydney Zoological Gardens. As mentioned, Bradley was mayor of Randwick for the terms of 1870, 1871, 1872 and 1884. He was also the M.L.A. for East Sydney for a time.

In 1873 the house was tenanted by William Colbum Mayne. In 1886 this being Henry Grimslow, and in 1889 Henry G. Lomax (squatter), and then from 1890 to 1892 by the Hales family.

In January 1894 John Watkins's first born son, John Leo, was registered as the owner of the Aston Lodge Estate. John Leo after education at Sydney Grammar School and Christ's College, Cambridge was called to the London Bar in 1872. Having returned to Sydney in 1873, in 1874 he was admitted to the N.S.W Bar. He married Agnes Jane Makinson daughter of Thomas Cooper Makinson of the legal firm ? in 1879, and subsequently resided at Llanthony, Hunters Hill in 1885. After at period at the Bar, John Leo was appointed to the position of N.S.W. Parliamentary Draftsman in 1892 and retained this position until 1918. As such he was involved in the drafting of many pieces of legislature during this period, and, with Edmund Barton and others, the draft constitutions for the Commonwealth of Australia.

=== Private then religious schools (1891–1901) ===
In 1891 the first of two schools which operated in Aston Lodge in the closing years of the nineteenth century was established by Misses Anne A. Hales (Hales father? George, a tea merchant, was also resident at this time). Hales' residence and presumably school continued until May 1892.14 This school was one of about seven such private schools operating in the Randwick area at the time.

In July 1892 the Loreto Sisters of Ballarat, Victoria opened their first school (with convent) in New South Wales at Aston Lodge. The Loreto Sisters had arrived in Sydney in mid-January 1892 initially staying at Avonmore Terraces, The Avenue, Randwick. After a brief lease of a property known as Selbourne on Alison Road between late January and April 1892 (which was considered too far from Randwick village and tram route) a lease of Aston Lodge (with 11 acres) was negotiated with John Leo Watkins at an annual rental of £300.

The Loreto Sisters' school was advertised as a Boarding and Day School run by the sisters under the charge of M.M. Dorothea Frizell for a "limited number of Young Lady Boarders". The use of the site by the Loreto Sisters included the residence as a convent, school, chapel and boarders' dormitories. Within a short period of time a double storey timber dormitory was also constructed, the architect for which was Richard Dennehy. (This building is reported to have been later removed to the Loreto Normanhurst campus).

The Sisters of Loreto Order was established in Germany in the early seventh century by a number of expatriate English Catholics. The work of this Order was first extended to Australia in 1875 from the Irish Mother House with the establishment of Mary's Mount Ballarat, Victoria. The Order expanded into New South Wales at the beginning of 1892 with four nuns under the charge of Mother Mary Dorothea Frizelle.

The Loreto school proved very successful within its first years of opening providing courses in instruction at moderate cost for both boarders and day girls who whom were prepared for the Senior, Junior and Matriculation Public examinations. The goal of the Sisters was to train the girls in "character, and to educate them without cramming. In point of fact, to bring them up naturally, moulding their lives into those of women of genuine piety and nobility of nature, developing their intellects." The Sisters adopted the "kindergarten system" for instruction of younger children.

In June 1894 'after lobbying by the Catholic Archbishop of Sydney Cardinal Moran, the Sisters assumed responsibility for religious education of primary school girls in the Randwick Parish. Histories of the Loreto Sisters mention that a wooden school building was erected in the grounds of Aston Lodge for this purpose, which was blessed and opened by the Cardinal, and that his building was later removed to the Loreto's Normanhurst campus, but it not entirely clear if this a mistaken reference to the boarder's dormitory previously mentioned.

In October 1897 the boarders and four nuns moved to the new purpose built school and convent established in the upper North Shore suburb of Normanhurst. The day girls continued to be educated at Randwick until the school at Kirribilli was opened in 1901 (occupying their present premises in 1907)20. The last move was reported to have been due to Kirribilli being more convenient for the school's pupils in terms of contiguity to the tram, ferry and rail services.

=== Aged care and novitiate/Mount St. Joseph (1901–1984) ===
Commencing in early 1901, the Aston Lodge Estate site was subdivided by John Leo Watkins. The present-day curtilage of the site 3 acres 2 roods 20 114 perches (being Lots 1, 2 and 11 of this subdivision) bounded by present-day Avoca Street, Stephen Street, Stanley Street and Chepstow Street) was acquired by the Little Sisters of the Poor in July 1901. The Little Sisters gave the Loreto Sisters one month's notice to leave the premises.

The Little Sisters of the Poor Order was established in France by Jeanne Jugan in 1839 with the role of caring for the elderly poor in the community. By their own fundamental rule, the Order could not accept any funds or any permanent endowment, with their help extended to the poor coming from providential dispensation of daily charity. The members of the order practice four vows of poverty, chastity, obedience, and hospitality. By the turn of this century the Order comprised approximately 5,000 sisters around the world. The mother house (La Tour St. Joseph) is at St. Pern, France.

The first congregation of the Little Sisters of the Poor in Australia was founded in Melbourne in November 1884. The second foundation in Australia followed two years later in Sydney with seven nuns arriving in November 1886. The invitation to undertake charitable work in Sydney came from the Catholic Archbishop of Sydney, Cardinal Moran, with the provision of financial help came from prominent Catholics of the day such as John Hughes, M.L.C. and member of the St. Vincent de Paul Society, and a Miss Sharkey and her Ladies' Association of Charity.

The Little Sisters of the Poor were one of about seven comparable Catholic religious caring orders established in New South Wales in the late nineteenth century. The other orders were: -

Aston Lodge was converted to a novitiate for the Order with its first 7 postulants starting in 1901. A wooden chapel was built soon after, replaced by the present chapel in 1921. Its interior was intended to recall the chapel at the Order's Mother House in St.Pern, France. Further additions comprised a laundry and old men's quarters built in 1929 to the design of Scott, Green and Scott, who also designed a gate house built in 1932–3. In the 1930s with increasing numbers of young women wishing to enter the order, an extensive new Novitiate building was built in 1936-7 designed by Scott, Green & Scott. A building known as Marian House on the Chepstow Street side was built for extra accommodation.

By the 1970s, the number of young women wishing to enter the Order had declined dramatically. In 1982 the Little Sisters of the Poor proposed selling Aston Lodge to developer Beinda P/L for $3.1m to raise funds to rebuild and upgrade their aged care facilities nearby at Mount St. Joseph's. To facilitate the sale the Order sought a rezoning of the site from church use to 2 (C2) to allow high rise development. The original scheme had a number of 3 and 8 storey flat buildings and 20 town houses and necessitated demolishing the 1921 chapel and 1936 novitiate and converting Aston Lodge to flats. It met widespread opposition from the community and interest groups. The Heritage Council of NSW placed a section 130 order on Aston Lodge (stopping demolition) on 15 May 1983. The Heritage Council refused the development application in 1983. The Novitiate subsequently relocated to its Hastings, New Zealand establishment and the Aston Lodge novitiate site was sold in 1984. Randwick City Council approved the Mount St. Joseph's development in April 1984 and the old buildings there were demolished and the site redeveloped.

=== Emanuel School (1984–present) ===
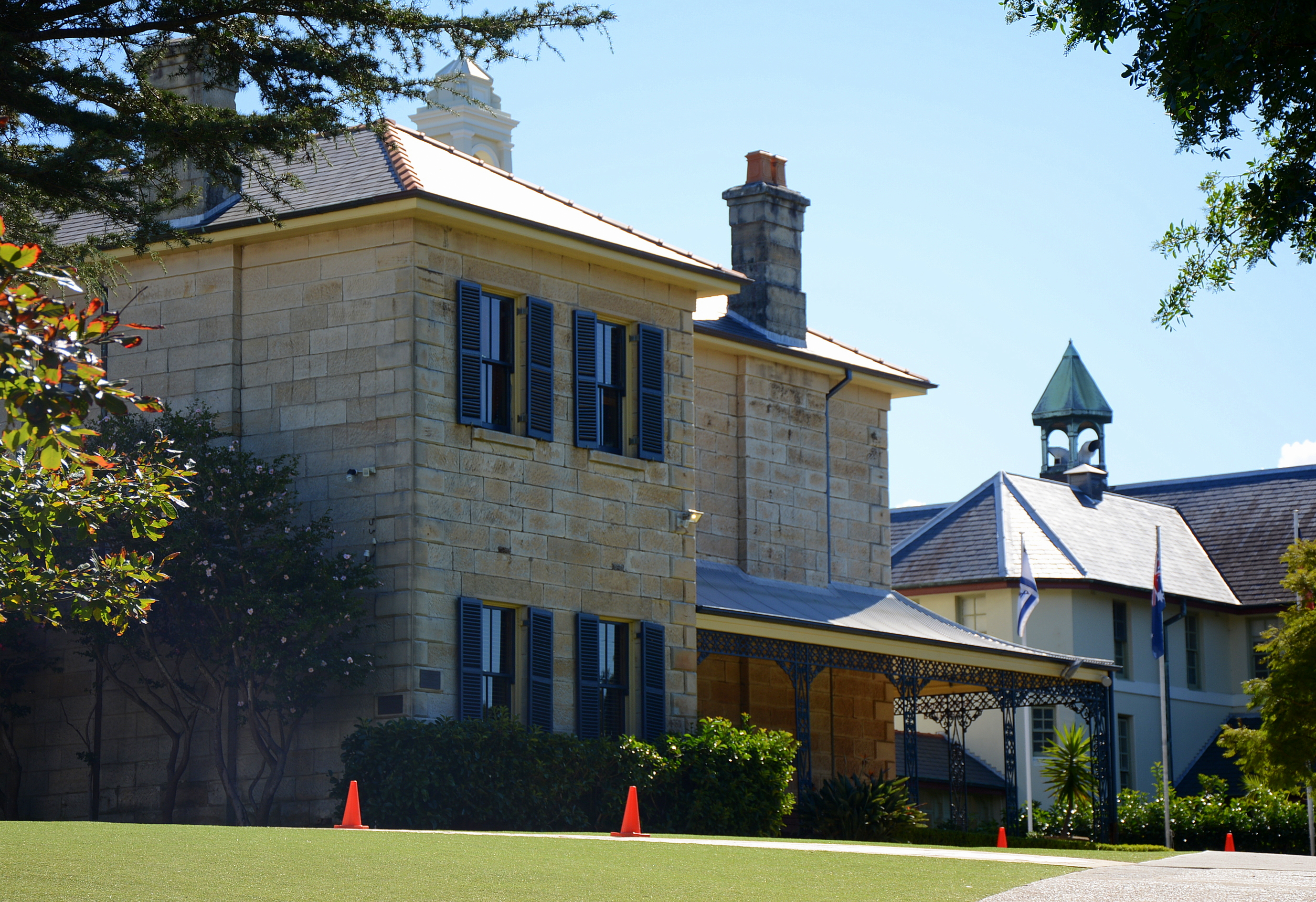
Emanuel School, pictured in 2015.

In February 1984 the Little Sisters of the Poor conveyed part of the Aston Lodge site under lease-purchase agreement to the International Grammar School, a non-denominational independent school. Under the arrangement the IGS acquired an interest in the use of the novitiate, Aston Lodge and chapel for school purposes. Simultaneously the Emanuel School expressed an interest in purchasing the site and entered negotiations with the Little Sisters of the Poor. The Order decided in favour of The Emanuel School in July 1984, who in turn offered to accommodate the IGS for two years to allow them to find a new site. IGS leased the site through 1984 and relocated to Surry Hills in 1985. In February 1985 title of a substantial area of the property was registered to The Emanuel School. The remainder of the present site, at the corner of Chepstow and Stanley Streets, was bought in 1986. This allowed The Emanuel School to consolidate their schools for infants, primary and secondary pupils on a single site. In February 1986 Government approval was granted to use the property as an infants and secondary school. It was officially opened by Prime Minister Bob Hawke on 17 August 1986. A range of works converted Aston Lodge to offices (now called the Saunders Administration Building), deconsecration of the chapel to convert it to classrooms and library, conversion of laundry into Art Block, novitiate into classrooms (Brender Moss Building), assembly hall and synagogue, converting Marian House to use as the Adler School, building a new entrance off Stanley Street and two demountable classroom blocks. Since 1986 the School embarked on a major capital works program, with a new hall, kindergarten, various blocks, new perimeter walls etc. A conservation management study was prepared for the property by Clive Lucas, Stapleton & Partners in 1999 and updated in 2002 with more of a focus on the landscape components of the school grounds.

=== Laundry Block (Art Building) history ===
The Lynette Sandra Phillips Art Building was built in brick with terracotta tile roof as a laundry and adjacent drying yard in 1929, designed by Scott, Green & Scott. It sits on a sandstone retaining wall which may date to the second half of the 20th century. Perhaps during the 1940s dormer windows were modified and verandahs on north and south sides enclosed.

=== Condition ===
While outside the scope of this report (see section 1.5), the place may be of Aboriginal archaeological potential in that it is probably sited on the same massive dune system as the Prince of Wales Hospital site where in recent years shell middens have been unearthed through controlled archaeological investigation.

The site has a documented European occupation back to the mid-19th century. It is the location of one of a comparatively small number of large domestic residences built in the eastern suburbs of Sydney. A succession of surveys dating from c. 1890-1930s and photographs from c. 1920s-c. 1960s describe the physical evolution of the site to indicate that the first permanent capital improvement was made c. 1864 for a stone residence and stables for the Watkins family which has been altered, adapted and extended with addition of new buildings over time to the present.

Within this known occupational history, the earlier c.1864-1901 phase in view of the generally domestic nature of land uses and improvement may be of archaeological potential in that:

- the physical survey indicates that there have been few major internal alterations to Aston Lodge. Controlled intervention may therefore reveal details of original/early space finishes and fittings and potential deposits within concealed sub-floor spaces;
- while the site has potentially been disturbed by building works undertaken from c.1920 there are areas in the vicinity of Aston Lodge, in particular within the enclosed kitchen/work yard which may not have been disturbed and may therefore be of archaeological potential for features such as latrines and wells, food dumps, sewerage and drainage works, etc.;
- landscaping works in the form of paths, drives, etc. laid out during this period may be extant under the existing reinforced concrete system.

Of the next phase, c.1901- say c.1940, that being the construction and operation of the former Novitiate, the site may be of archaeological potential in that:

- archaeological investigation may therefore reveal new information about the configuration and uses of a number of now demolished buildings shown on a c.1930s survey (figure A4.9);
- archaeological investigation may reveal new information about the configuration of some of the extant buildings located near the entrance drive and their potential date of construction.

=== Modifications and dates ===
- 1860s: 11 acre estate – Aston Lodge (Watkins, who also purchased another 12 acres of land to the east)
- 1891: run as a boarding school privately
- 1892: Loreto Sisters opened their first school in NSW on this site
- 1901: sale to Little Sisters of the Poor, for elderly aged care with limited means
- 1983: part of site leased to International Grammar School
- 1984: site sold to the Emanuel School.

== Facilities and curriculum ==
The School has a compulsory Instrumental Programme for students from Year 3 to 6 and students are encouraged to continue this until year 12. This ensures that music is one of Emanuel's focal points. Sport is another focal point of Emanuel's students.

The Emanuel School Learning Centre has specialised educators who support classroom learning across the entire school. Experienced and specially trained practitioners lead the "Gifted and Talented Programme" and "Opportunity Classes". Students benefit from the Laptop Programme which requires laptops for all primary Opportunity Classes and all High School students.

The Kornmehl Centre Emanuel Pre-school is situated on the same campus as the K-12 school and caters for 60 children from 3 to 5 years of age.

== Notable alumni ==
- Luda Kroitor (EC 2001) – dancer, reigning five time world Salsa champion; and Dancing with the Stars series 8 winner, with her partner Luke Jacobz
- Lara Pitt - Australian television presenter and sports journalist

== Heritage listing ==
As at 5 October 1999, The Emanuel School site, Randwick is a complex of buildings and grounds situated in the Randwick area, containing a c. 1864 suburban villa known as Aston Lodge designed by Edmund T. Blacket, with remnant garden planting, and a chapel (1921) and novitiate (1936) buildings constructed for the mendicant Roman Catholic order of the Little Sisters of the Poor who owned the site between 1901 and 1985.

Set on one of the highest points of the North Randwick ridge, within expansive grounds, parts of the site, in particular the novitiate building of 1936, are highly visible from areas in Queens Park, Centennial Park, Woollahra and Bondi Junction and as such it is one of the most prominent landmarks in the eastern suburbs of Sydney.

The site has important social and historical associations with the development of the Randwick area through the occupation of James Watkins, merchant and alderman of Randwick Council, and his large villa estate, the development of late 19th century private education in the eastern suburbs of Sydney with the Loreto Sisters' school, and the development of social welfare in NSW with the use of the site as the novitiate for the Little Sisters of the Poor who ran the adjoining Mount St Joseph home for the aged which was one of about three non-government aged homes operating in New South Wales in the late 19th century.

The site also contains a number of features which are historically associated with the use of the site by the Little Sisters of the Poor which are notable aesthetically within the Randwick area. These include the high enclosing walls (late 1920s & 1930s), the gate lodge (1932), the laundry (1929), and paths, drives and early plantings (c. 1930s) by Clive Lucas Stapleton, 1999:46; modified slightly by Mayne-Wilson & Associates, 2002, 55).

Emanuel School was listed on the New South Wales State Heritage Register on 2 April 1999 having satisfied the following criteria.

The place is important in demonstrating the course, or pattern, of cultural or natural history in New South Wales.

The Place served as the novitiate for the Little Sisters of the Poor since purchase of the site in 1901 up to closure in the 1980s. The novitiate was the first and only such establishment founded by the Little Sisters of the Poor in this country. The novitiate was for the whole of the Little Sisters of the Poor's sphere of operation in Oceania which included homes in Adelaide, Melbourne and Perth. In Auckland and Dunedin, New Zealand, and Nouméa and New Caledonia.

The use of the place as the novitiate for the Little Sisters of the Poor in Oceania is rare in the context of the worldwide history of this Order's operation.

== See also ==
- List of non-government schools in New South Wales
- Judaism in Australia
