= Hobart Walking Club =

Recreational walking club in Tasmania, Australia

Hobart Walking Club is a recreational walking club based in Hobart, Tasmania, Australia.

== History ==
The Hobart Walking Club was started in 1929 by Jack Thwaites and Evelyn Temple Emmett.

It has celebrated stages of its history in a number of commemorative publications at various milestones: 21 years, 50 years and 81 years.

It has published its journal The Tasmanian tramp since February 1933. The first issue was edited by Thwaites and Emmett, followed by four more issues up until 1936. The next two issues appeared in 1939, this time a "simpler, duplicator-type booklet", edited by Jeannette Cox. Number 19 was issued in 1970.

The club has also produced maps and other publications over the years.

== Description ==
Considerable effort by members exploring in the South West Tasmania region resulted in photographs and texts explaining access to the many rivers, mountains and tracks of the region, a considerable amount of material appearing in The Tasmanian tramp.

The organisation has also participated in search and rescue events, as well as promoting safety awareness in bushwalking.

A similar club exists in northern Tasmania, the Launceston Walking Club.

== Publications ==
Most publications by the club, apart from The Tasmanian tramp, were short runs or one-off publishing ventures.

- The Tasmanian tramp
- Walks programme
- Circular
