= Thwaites Dumpers =

British equipment manufacturer

Thwaites Limited
- Trade name: Thwaites
- Type: Private limited company
- Industry: Heavy equipment
- Founded: 1937; 89 years ago
- Founder: Basil Thwaites
- Headquarters: Cubbington, Warwickshire, England
- Products: Site Dumpers
- Revenue: £84.6m (2025)
- Number of employees: c. 282 (2025)
- Website: thwaitesdumpers.co.uk

Thwaites Limited, commonly known as Thwaites, is a British manufacturer of dumper trucks. The company was founded in 1937 and is based in Cubbington, Warwickshire, England.

== History ==
Thwaites was founded in 1937 by Basil Thwaites as a manufacturer of agricultural machinery. Following the Second World War, Thwaites challenged his designers to develop products to support the housebuilding boom and modernisation of construction, bringing a brick hoist and other worksite implements to market.

In 1955 they ceased production of agricultural machines to focus on site dumpers, which have since represented their sole product, aside from an unsuccessful attempt to enter the backhoe loader market with the "Alldig" in 1984.

In 1979, Thwaites launched the "Goliath" with an 8-ton capacity - a significant step up from their existing range which topped out at 4 tons, and sitting between smaller site dumpers and larger articulated dump trucks.

Thwaites introduced the first power shuttle transmission on a site dumper in 1986.

In 2017 Thwaites introduced cab options for three models to improve operator safety.

A range of Thwaites dumpers in 2019.

In 2022 the company exhibited a prototype battery-electric 3-tonne dumper at the Bauma trade fair. Thwaites launched 2- and 3-tonne electric dumpers in 2024.

The company's manufacturing facility occupies the same site since the 1930s, most recently expanded in 2025.
