= John Anthony Thwaites =

English art critic (1909–1981)

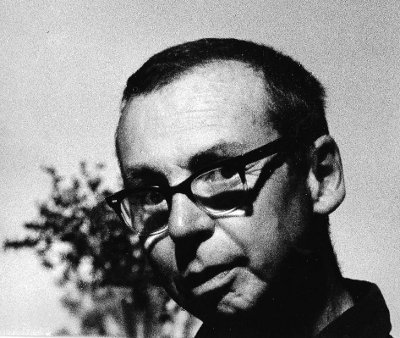
- John Anthony Thwaites, 1965
- Born: 21 January 1909; Kensington, London, UK
- Died: 21 November 1981 (aged 72); Leienkaul, Rheinland-Pfalz, Germany
- Citizenship: British

John Anthony Thwaites (21 January 1909 – 21 November 1981) was a British art critic and author, who lived and worked in West Germany from 1946.

== Biography ==
Thwaites studied history at the universities of Lausanne and Cambridge. From 1931 he was a member of the British Foreign Service, and worked until 1943 as a British vice-consul in Hamburg, New York, Chicago, Katowice, León (Mexico), and Panama. In 1946 he was posted from London to the British Consulate in Munich.

Thwaites worked as an art critic from 1933 onwards. He also started collecting works by modern masters such as Paul Klee, Kandinsky, and Henry Moore. This came to a premature end in 1939 when he had to abandon his entire collection in his then apartment in Katowice due to the German invasion of Poland.

In 1949 he left the Foreign Service and devoted himself to establishing modern art in West Germany, lecturing, writing for a number of newspapers and giving slideshows. He cofounded with the painter Rupprecht Geiger the group Zen 49. As German correspondent of Art and Artists (London), of Art News and Pictures on Exhibit (New York), among others, he worked to restore German art to the international standing he felt it deserved. Living in Düsseldorf from 1955 he supported the artists of Gruppe 53 and ZERO. In the seventies he worked as a lecturer at the Kunstakademie Düsseldorf and did radio broadcasts for Westdeutscher Rundfunk.

== Work ==
Thwaites viewed art as a mirror revealing the human experience of any epoch. According to him true artists are those who truthfully and originally interpret that reality, in contrast with "shameless epigones" whom he believed to be just chasing after success by following trends. His bête noire was Joseph Beuys, who was not an artist in his opinion, but a demagogue and seducer whom he eventually compared with Hitler.

As a critic Thwaites was a moralist. In 1961 he wrote in the German paper Deutsche Zeitung (Stuttgart/Köln):

A critic must be capable of rubbishing his personal friends and praise artists he personally dislikes. He should, if need be, harm himself. He must never write for personal advantage. Power and position are corrupting even as money. When critics protect each other and each other's protégés they create an intellectual corruption that will strangle art.

== Books ==
- Ich hasse die Moderne Kunst. ("I Hate Modern Art") Ullstein, Frankfurt 1960.
- Norbert Kricke. Thames and Hudson, London 1964.
- Der doppelte Maßstab. ("The Double Gauge") Seide, Frankfurt 1967.
- Hans Kaiser, Cologne 1979.
