= Jack Thwaites =

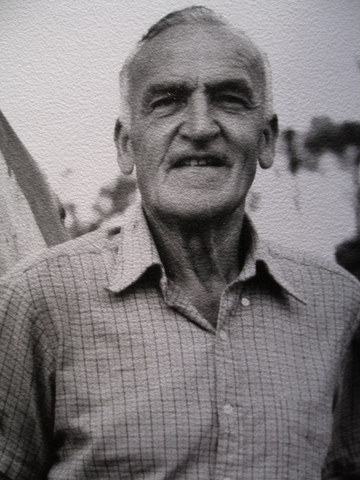
- Born: 24 June 1902; Kendal, England
- Died: 3 May 1986 (aged 83); Hobart, Tasmania, Australia
- Occupations: Public Servant, bushwalker and conservationist in Australia
- Spouse: Cecilie Marion Cripps

John Barrass Thwaites (1902–1986) was a British Australian pioneer Tasmanian bushwalker and conservationist. He made lifelong contributions to the community through his work with the National Fitness Council, Hobart Walking Club, Youth Hostels of Australia and his service on several National Parks Boards. Thwaites Plateau near Federation Peak in Tasmania's South-West National Park is named after him.

== Biography ==
Jack Thwaites was born in 1902 at Kendal in northern England. In 1913 he emigrated with his family to Hobart, Tasmania, where he was educated at the Friends' School. During these formative years the principles of the Quaker faith and a love of the outdoors helped shape the future direction of his life. On leaving school in 1919 he joined the Government Printing Office as an apprentice compositor. In his spare time he immersed himself in bushwalking and skiing, and from 1928 began undertaking major journeys into remote areas of the state. Within a decade Jack's passion for adventure and wild places made him a desirable choice as a member on National Park Boards. He held these board memberships in addition to his day job in the Public Service. On completing his apprenticeship he was appointed Costs Officer in the Government Printing Office. On 6 April 1935 he married Cecilie Marion Cripps at St. Georges Church, Battery Point; they had one daughter and one son. In 1946 Thwaites accepted the position of Administrative Officer of the Photographic Branch of the Lands and Surveys Department. In 1958 he took up a full-time appointment as Inspector of Scenic Reserves for the Scenery Preservation Board (forerunner to the National Parks and Wildlife Service). He held the joint positions of Secretary and Superintendent of Scenic Reserves for the Scenery Preservation Board at the time of his retirement in 1967.

By nature a man of peace, Jack chose to avoid confrontation wherever possible. Nevertheless, he fought tirelessly for the preservation of Tasmania's wilderness regions throughout his life. An amiable personality and courteous, self-effacing manner endeared him to people from all walks of life. A great raconteur, Jack drew on an inexhaustible fund of bush experiences and personalities as he dispensed billy tea round the campfire. An untiring belief in young people and his work with them stands today as one of his most valued gifts to the community. In 1977 he was awarded the Order of Australia medal for his conservation work. Jack was an active member of many organizations throughout his life – Tasmanian Field Naturalists Club, Royal Society of Tasmania, Tasmanian Historical Research Association (THRA) and the Royal Geographical Society. His greatest contributions, however, were made to Youth Hostels of Australia (YHA) and to the Hobart Walking Club. At the latter he held every position in the club from its foundation in 1929 until his death in 1986. He was made third Honorary Life Member of the Hobart Walking Club in 1948. In later life his charismatic personality and courteous demeanour led many walkers to address him, endearingly, as 'Gentleman Jack'. He remained an active bushwalker and conservationist until his death in 1986.

== Notable Achievements ==
- Founded Hobart Walking Club with Evelyn Temple Emmett in 1929.
- Undertook early journeys to the South Coast (1928), Du Cane Range (1931), Frenchmans Cap (1934) and Federation Peak (1948/49)
- Joined the party which made the first official crossing of the Overland Track in January, 1931
- Responsible for much of Tasmania's National Park nomenclature, particularly in the Frenchmans Cap region and the Cradle Mountain-Lake St Clair National Park.
- Pushed strongly for the conservation of Tasmania's wilderness and historic areas through his work on National Park boards and the Scenery Preservation Board.
- Made valuable contributions to the Youth Hostels movement (YHA), both in Tasmania and nationally.
