= Thomas Thwaites (civil servant) =

British politician

Sir Thomas Thwaites or Thwaytes (c. 1435 – 1503) was an English civil servant, who was involved in the Perkin Warbeck conspiracy.

He served as Edward IV's Chancellor of the Exchequer from 1471 to 1483 and Chancellor of the Duchy of Lancaster between 2 April 1478 and 7 July 1483. Upon the ascension of Richard III he was knighted and moved to Treasurer of Calais, where he served from 1483 to 1490. Thwaites's tenure as Chancellor occurred during the Great Bullion Famine and the Great Slump in England.

He was arrested for treason in 1493 for involvement in the Perkin Warbeck conspiracy. Originally sentenced to death, his sentence was altered to imprisonment in the Tower of London and a fine.

He owned the manor of Barnes in London.
