= Frenchmans Cap =

Mountain in Western Tasmania, Australia

- trullennuer or mebbelek
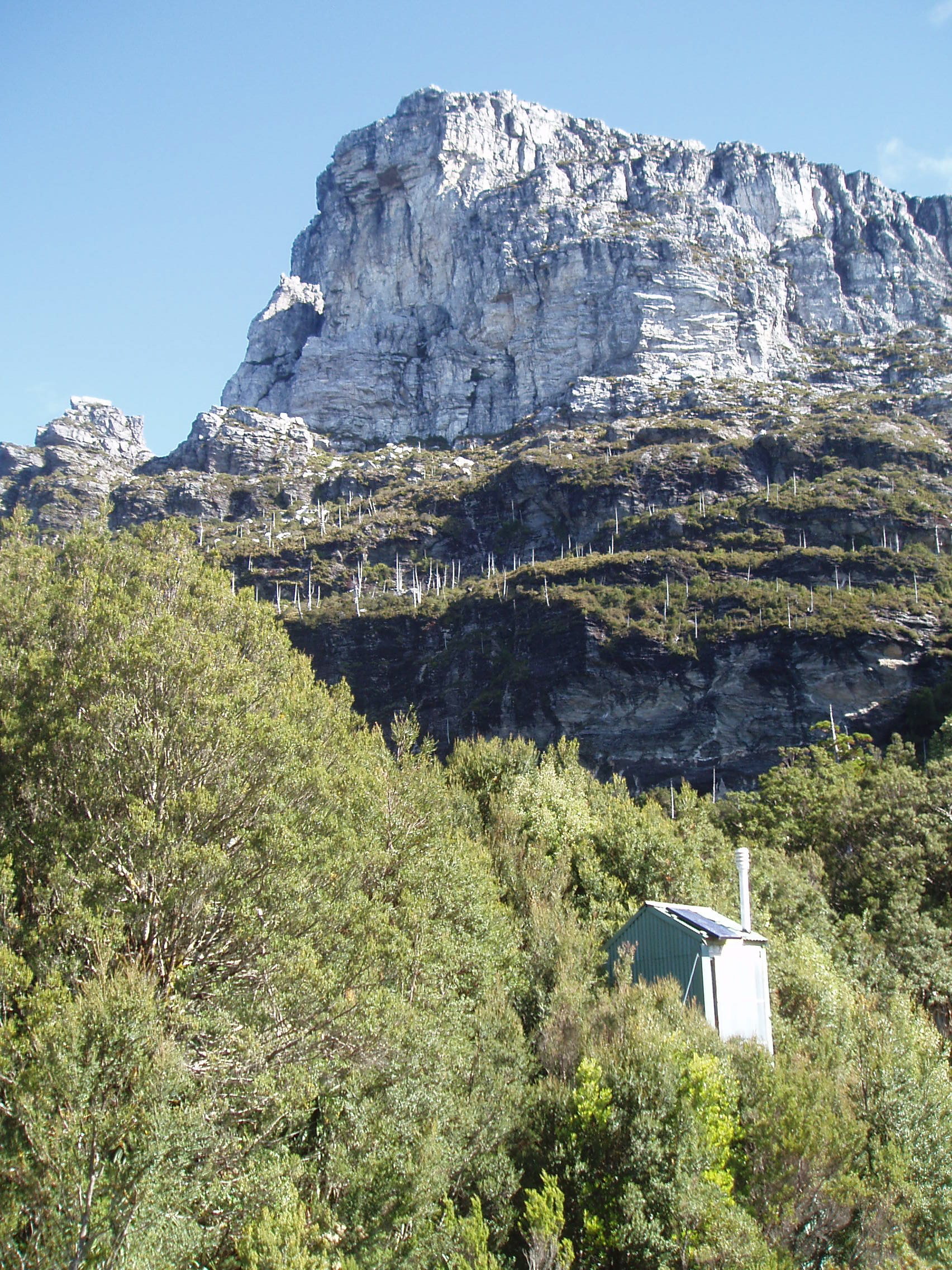
- View of Frenchmans Cap from near Lake Tahune Hut, 2005

Highest point
- Elevation: 1,446 m (4,744 ft)
- Prominence: 966m
- Coordinates: 42°16′12″S 145°49′12″E

Geography
- Location within Tasmania
- Location: West Coast, Tasmania, Australia
- Parent range: West Coast Range

Geology
- Rock age: Jurassic

Climbing
- First ascent: James Sprent (European; 1853)

Frenchmans Cap is a mountain in the West Coast, Tasmania, Australia. The mountain is situated in the Franklin-Gordon Wild Rivers National Park.

At 1,446 metres (4,744 ft) above sea level, it is within the top thirty highest mountains in Tasmania.

== Location ==
The mountain lies east of the West Coast Range, yet due to its prominence, it can be seen from Macquarie Harbour. It lies south of the Lyell Highway from which it can be viewed from various locations, and south west of Cradle Mountain-Lake St Clair National Park.

The peaks of the Frenchmans area include Frenchmans Cap (1,443 metres (4,734 ft)), Clytemnestra and Philps Peak (both 1,280 metres (4,200 ft)), and Philps Ridge (1,200 metres (3,900 ft)).

== Etymology ==
Frenchmans Cap lies in the traditional lands of the Aboriginal Tasmanians, most likely the Toogee nation. The traditional names for Frenchmans Cap are Trullenuer (trul.len.neur), Toindy (toin.dy) or Mebbelek.

Even though the peak was an early landmark for ships sailing the west coast, the first recorded use of Frenchmans Cap was in 1822 in connection with Macquarie Harbour Penal Station, from where the peak was visible. The origin of the name is attributed to its appearance from some angles as looking like a Frenchman's cap, notably the Liberty cap worn during the French Revolution (1789–1799).

A variation of that was reported by Henry Widdowson, who wrote in 1829 that the name was derived from "its generally being covered with snow and bearing some resemblance to the shape of dress which invariably adorns the head of a French Cook".

== History ==
The distinctive shape of the mountain was used as a guiding beacon by many, largely unsuccessful, parties of escaping convicts as they attempted to struggle through the dense scrub of Western Tasmania to the settled districts further east. It was mentioned as a geographical reference in the account later dictated by convict Alexander Pearce to authorities, following his capture.

The earliest European recorded to have ascended was James Sprent and his trigonometrical party in 1853. Another ascent as part of a gold prospecting expedition was described by Tully in 1857.

In 1941 the Frenchmans Cap National Park was created and its boundary was in effect the Franklin River. This park was subsumed into the Franklin-Gordon Wild Rivers National Park in the 1990s.

The country around the mountain is invariably referred to by the books and the material written about the Franklin River. Johnson Dean's book gives a graphic account with maps and pictures the nature of the country.

== Access ==
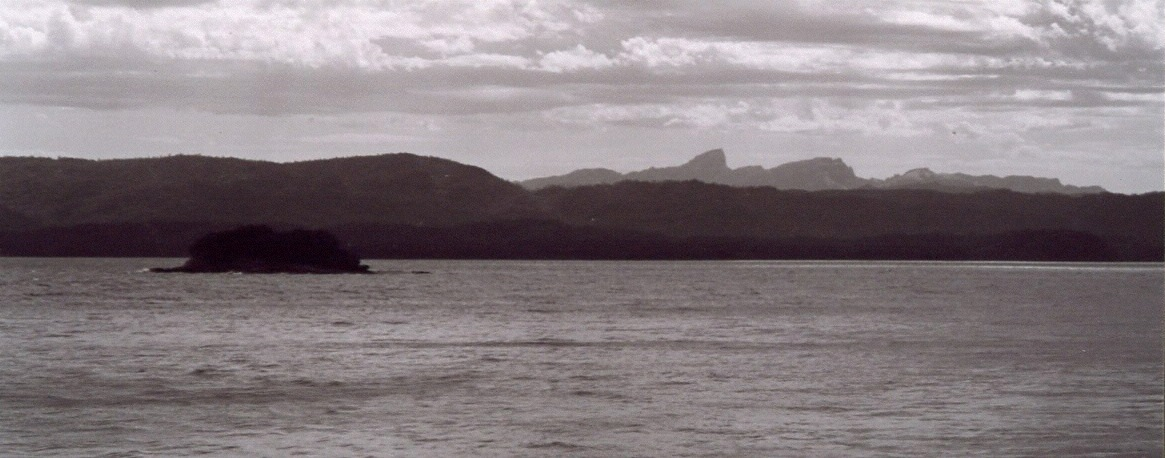
Frenchmans Cap as seen from Macquarie Harbour, on the west coast

Access to the mountain is usually via a multi-day bushwalk from the Lyell Highway. The Tasmania Parks & Wildlife Service and other authorities in Tasmania give advice about the access and preparation needed – due to the changing conditions of the area.

=== Early tracks ===
In 1910, and 1913 tracks were cut up the mountain from Crotty, but both were abandoned. A 1931 track starting from the Lyell highway and passing by Lake Vera (similar to the present track) was more lasting, and Frenchman's began to be recognised as a tourist asset.

By 1947 there was a relatively permanent track in place, with significant trackwork done by bushwalking clubs. By 1948 there was a hut under construction at Lake Tahune, near the base of the peak. This hut was destroyed by a bushfire in 1966.

A replacement hut, Tahune #2 was completed in 1971 - a prefabricated design that slept 16 people in two two-tier bunks and was heated by a coal fuel stove.

Lake Vera Hut was built in 1979 and sleeps 20 people in two two-tier bunk configurations.

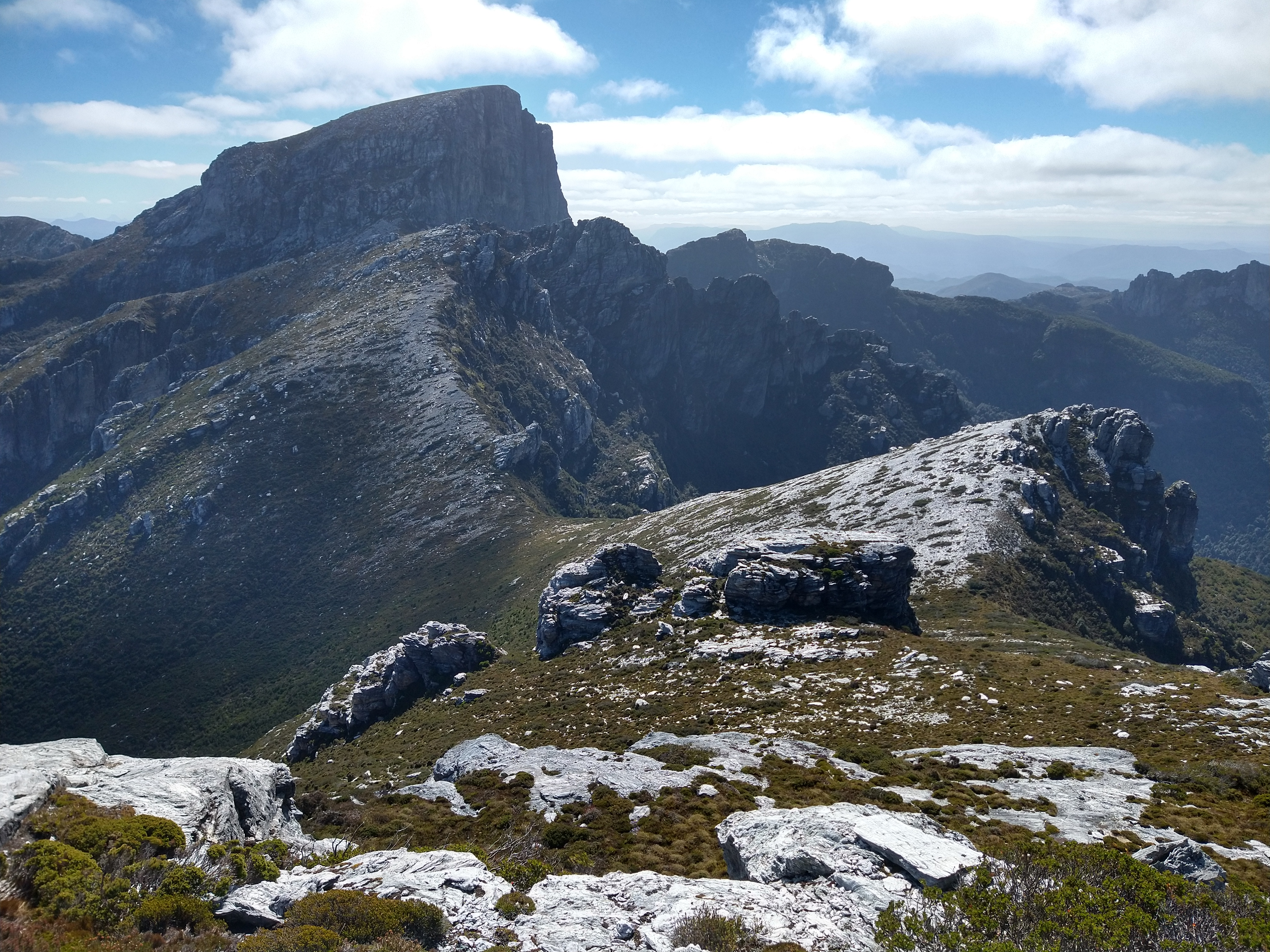
View of Frenchmans Cap from Clytemnestra, Franklin Gordon Wild Rivers National Park

=== Track improvements from Dick Smith donation ===
In 2008, Australian businessman Dick Smith, a keen bushwalker, was dismayed at the condition of the "Sodden Loddon's" section of the track. The buttongrass plains were not holding up to the number of walkers coming through, and the track had turned to waist deep mud in many sections. He donated $1.1 million over a decade, matched by Parks Tas, which allowed for duckboards to be placed across the buttongrass, the track diverted around the damaged South Loddon Plains and Lake Tahune Hut rebuilt.

The new Tahune hut is architecturally designed, well insulated with a hydro-electric power supply and electric heating and sleeps 24 people.

== Climbing ==
For climbers, Frenchmans Cap offers a variety of trad routes on generally sound, quartzite rock. In keeping with the name of the mountain some of these climbs also have French names including A Toi La Gloire (better known as The Sydney Route), a 380-metre (1,250 ft), 13-pitch, grade 17 climb on the south-east face and Tierry Le Fronde, a 150-metre (490 ft), six-pitch, grade 16 climb on the Tahune Face.

Serious climbing has occurred since the 1960s, as detailed in a 1990 article in Rock by Stephen Bunton. Jon Nermuts Tasmanian climbing page serves as the main information resource for routes on the main face as well as Gerry Narkowicz's description in Climb Tasmania.

== Painting and photography ==
Frank Hurley's black and white images from the 1950s, which are in the National Library's online collection, provide accessible close-up views of the features around Frenchmans Cap.

== Literature ==
Barry Maitland's 2008 mystery novel Bright Air contains a vivid description of a climb of Frenchmans Cap. It also features in For the Term of His Natural Life by Marcus Clarke and the non-fiction book Hell's Gates: The terrible journey of Alexander Pearce, Van Diemen's Land cannibal by Paul Collins (Hardie Grant, 2002). A more recent book is by Simon Kleinig in 2012.
