= Fritz Winter =

German painter

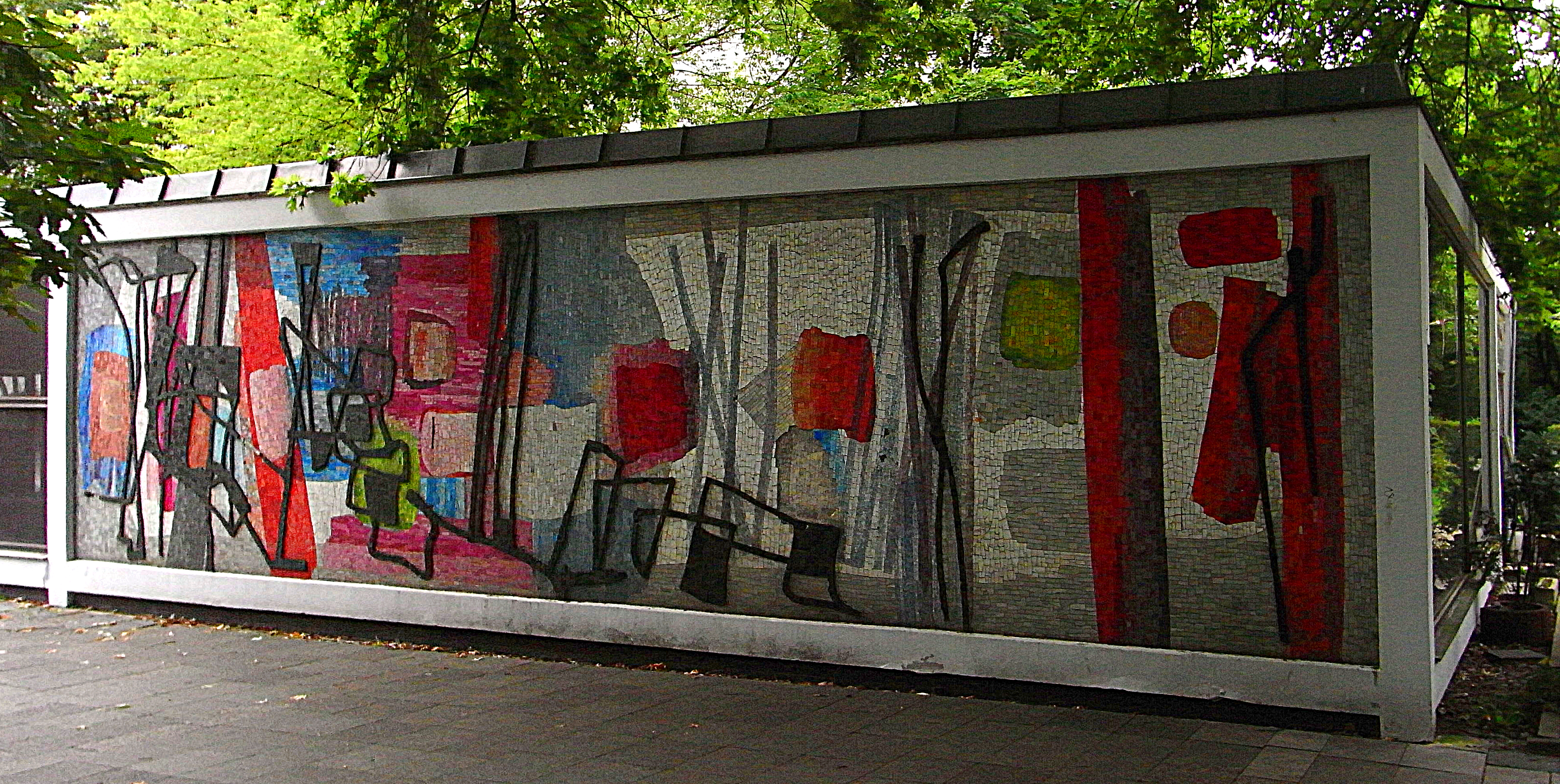
Glass mosaic by Fritz Winter at the Hansaplatz metrostation in Berlin

Fritz Winter (22 September 1905 in Altenbögge (now part of Bönen) – 1 October 1976 in Herrsching) was a German painter of the postwar period best known for his abstract works in the Art Informel style.

== Life ==
Like his father, Winter began electrical work in the coal mines at a young age. In 1925, however, his travels in Belgium and the Netherlands kindled his interest in drawing and painting, particularly the work of Vincent van Gogh. Within two years this affinity led to his admission to the Bauhaus, the state-sponsored Weimar school of art and applied design founded in 1919 by architect Walter Gropius. Winter studied in Dessau under Bauhaus masters Vasily Kandinsky, Paul Klee, and Oskar Schlemmer, among others, for three years, and participated in Junge Bauhausmaler (Young Bauhaus painters) in 1929. He formed a close friendship and artistic kinship with Ernst Ludwig Kirchner, frequently visiting Kirchner in Davos, Switzerland, and also befriended sculptor Naum Gabo in Berlin. During this period Winter worked primarily on paper due to the expense of canvas.

After leaving the Bauhaus, Winter taught at the Pädagogische Akademie, Halle an der Saale, Germany, but resigned following the establishment of the National Socialist regime in 1933. He moved to Munich and then Dießen am Ammersee. Winter was soon counted among the so-called degenerate artists whose work the Nazi government banned and purged from German museums in 1937. In 1939, with the onset of World War II, the artist was drafted into the German army and sent to the Eastern front, fighting in Poland and Russia. He nonetheless produced art during periods of leave and in 1944 executed his Triebkräfte der Erde (Driving forces of the earth), a major series of 45 paintings on paper that symbolically represent the struggle of anti-Fascist artists and intellectuals in Germany. In May 1945, shortly before the armistice, the Russian army took Winter as a prisoner of war and detained him in Siberia until 1949. His long-time companion and future wife Margarete Schreiber-Rüffer ensured that his paintings were exhibited in his absence.

On his return to Europe, Winter resumed painting in a more colorful palette and embraced prevailing avant-garde trends toward abstraction. In 1949, he cofounded with some of his fellow German artists the Gruppe der Gegenstandslosen (Group of nonrepresentational artists, renamed ZEN 49 in January 1950) in Munich. They exhibited together until 1957 and represented the German counterparts to Tachisme (from the French tache, for blot or stain), or Art Informel painters. Zen Buddhism greatly influenced their practice, which privileged a calligraphic painting style. In 1950 Winter received his first postwar solo exhibition in Munich and five other German cities, and visited Pierre Soulages and Hans Hartung in Paris. Winter exhibited at the Pittsburgh International (now Carnegie International, 1952); São Paulo Biennial (1955); Venice Biennale (1956); and Documenta, Kassel, West Germany (1955, 1959). His first U.S. solo exhibition took place at Hacker Gallery, New York (1952), and he was included in Younger European Painters: A Selection (1953–54), Guggenheim Museum, and The New Decade: 22 European Painters and Sculptors (1955), Museum of Modern Art, New York. The Deutscher Künstlerbund, Berlin, selected Winter for an award in 1951, but he resigned from the association in 1954 as a result of the debate surrounding abstraction. In 1955 Winter began teaching at the Landeskunstschule, Hamburg, West Germany, and two years later he was appointed professor at the Staatliche Hochschule für Bildende Künste, Kassel.

Several German cities mounted major retrospectives to mark the artist's 60th birthday in 1965. Winter slowly withdrew from the art scene in the late 1960s, retiring from his long-standing academic position in Kassel in 1970 and returning to Dießen am Ammersee. He died on October 1, 1976, in Herrsching am Ammersee, West Germany.

== Work ==
During his studies, Fritz Winter had distanced himself from the ideas of the Bauhaus. He represented a "L’Art-pour l’Art attitude" and criticized the attitude toward painting within the Bauhaus community. He dealt intensively with the teachings of Kandinsky and Klee, but even his early experiments show a free approach detached from the Bauhaus ideals. His work should be viewed as a cycle, as he repeatedly took up old forms and added new ones, never completely detaching himself from the object like other abstract artists. After being banned from painting and exhibiting, as well as being a prisoner of war, Winter went on sabbatical in Dießen. There he created the “driving forces of the earth”, an enduring key concept of the post-war art scene. He was one of the major pioneers of abstraction in Europe. He was a founding member of the artist group ZEN 49, which saw itself in the tradition of the Blauen Reiter and acted as an example of the spirit of a renewed world.

In 1949 Fritz Winter produced his first serigraphs, making him one of the pioneers of artistic screen printing in Germany.

== The Fritz Winter Foundation & Fritz Winter Prize ==
The Fritz Winter Foundation was founded in 1965 by Konrad Knoepfel and is dedicated to promoting science and research as well as art and culture by assisting talented young people in these fields. As part of its mission beginning in 1986 the foundation awards the Fritz Winter Prize to promote young talents in science and research as well as art and culture. In 2020, it was awarded to Nora Schattauer and Eva-Maria Schön.
