= Zen 49 =

Zen 49 was a group of German artists, who came together in the gallery "Otto Stangl" in Munich in July 1949. Originally the Gruppe der Ungegenständlichen, they took the name Zen 49 the following year. The seven members were Willi Baumeister, Rolf Cavael, Gerhard Fietz, Rupprecht Geiger, Willy Hempel, Brigitte Meier-Denninghoff and Fritz Winter. They were joined by Bernard Schultze in 1955.

Their first exhibition was held in June 1949 in the Munich Amerikahaus. The group continued to exhibit until 1957. Retrospectives exhibitions were held in Baden-Baden in 1987, Centre d'art contemporain de Saint-Priest in France in 1989 and in Munich in 1999.
