= Thomas Thwaites (cricketer) =

Australian cricketer

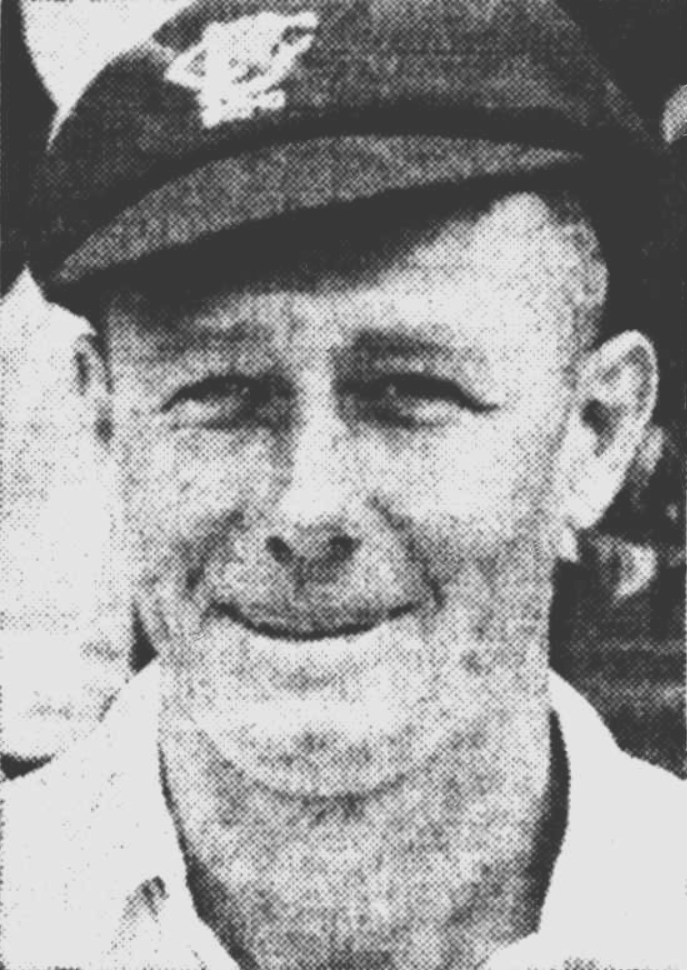

Personal information
- Born: 1 July 1910; Beaudesert, Queensland, Australia
- Died: 24 May 2000 (aged 89); Beaudesert, Queensland, Australia
- Source: Cricinfo, 8 October 2020

Thomas Thwaites (1 July 1910 – 24 May 2000) was an Australian cricketer. He played in one first-class match for Queensland in 1940/41.

== See also ==
- List of Queensland first-class cricketers
