= Thomas Thwaites (designer) =

British designer

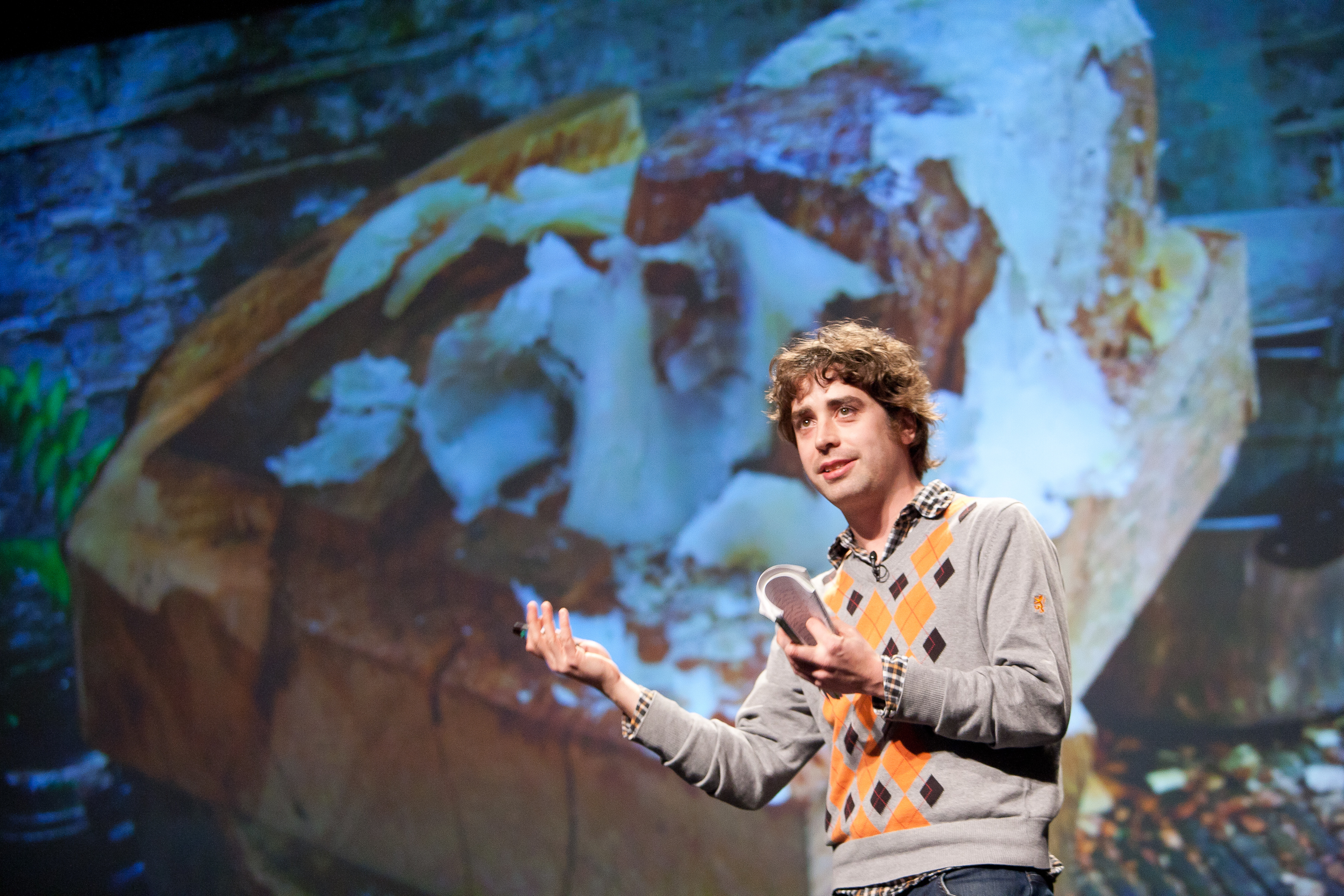
Thwaites in 2011 at Poptech in Maine

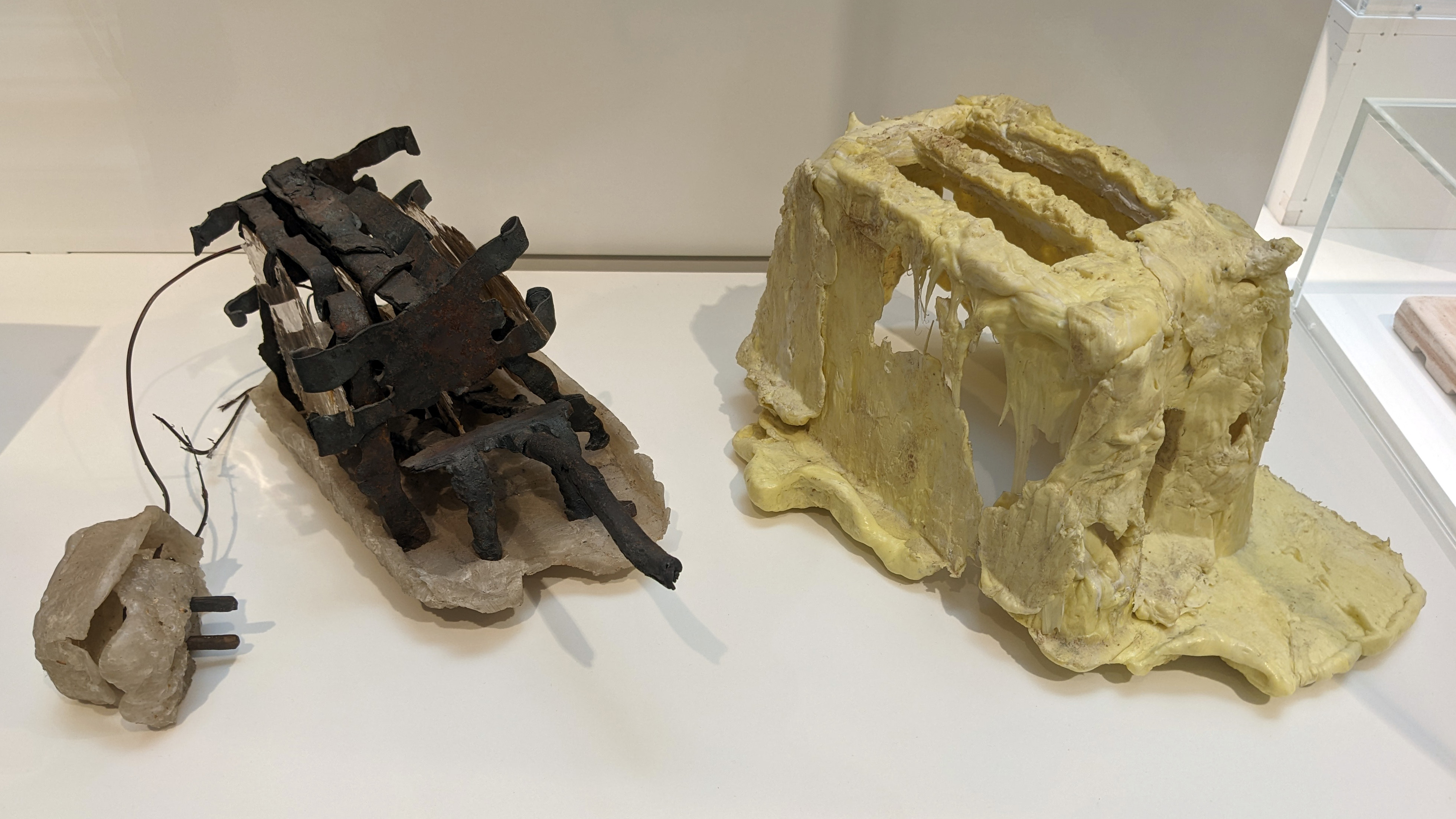
Toaster and casing from "The Toaster Project", on display in the V&A in September 2022

Thomas Thwaites is a British designer and writer. He describes himself as "a designer (of a more speculative sort), interested in technology, science, futures research & etc."

== Biography ==
Thwaites studied economics and biology at University College London, followed by a master's degree in Design Interactions from the Royal College of Art i n 2009.

In a nine-month project as part of his MA course, Thwaites attempted to build a toaster from scratch. The project was inspired by a quote from Douglas Adams' 1992 novel Mostly Harmless: "Left to his own devices he couldn't build a toaster. He could just about make a sandwich, and that was it." A toaster has about 400 components: he simplified the materials list to copper, steel, plastic, mica and nickel and attempted to mine, refine, and otherwise process all the raw materials needed. He published The Toaster Project: Or a Heroic Attempt to Build a Simple Electric Appliance from Scratch, and gave a TED talk "How I Built a Toaster - From Scratch". The tools and artefacts from the project are on display as an installation in the Victoria and Albert Museum, in room 76 "Design 1900 to Now".

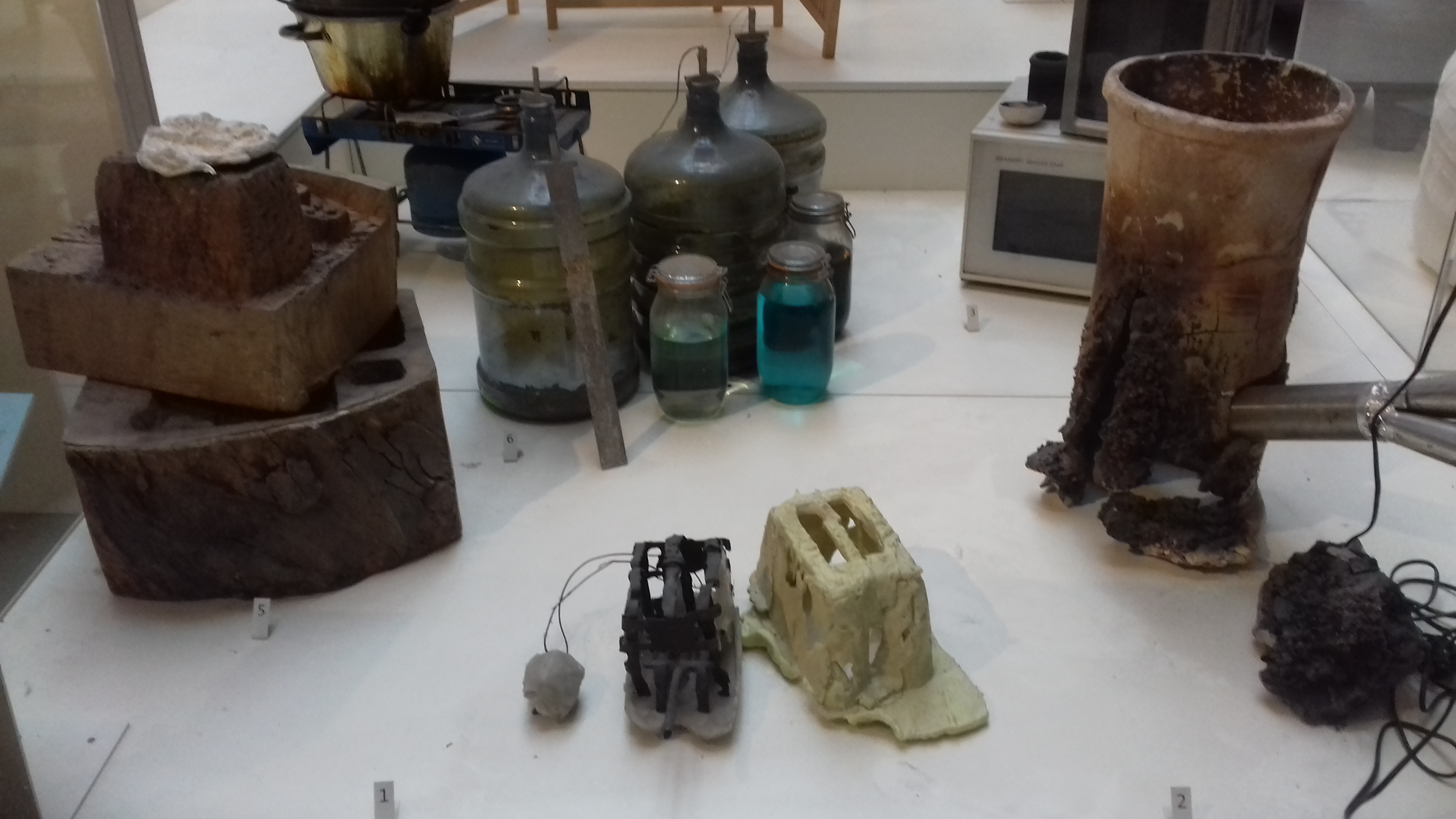
The Toaster Project installation at V&A August 2017

He later spent several days living among goats in the Alps, using prosthetic goat-like legs and eating grass using an artificial rumen, to explore the life of goats. This resulted in GoatMan: How I Took a Holiday from Being Human and an Ig Nobel Prize.

In January 2017 he appeared on BBC Radio 4's Museum of Curiosity. His hypothetical donation to the imaginary museum was a history book written in 2222AD, covering the present time.

In 2017–2018 he was a visiting professor in the Industrial Design department of Rhode Island School of Design.

== Selected publications ==
- Thwaites, Thomas (2011). The Toaster Project: Or a Heroic Attempt to Build a Simple Electric Appliance from Scratch. Princeton Architectural Press. ISBN 978-1-56898-997-6.
- Thwaites, Thomas (2016). GoatMan: How I Took a Holiday from Being Human. Princeton Architectural Press. ISBN 978-1-61689-405-4.

== See also ==
- List of Ig Nobel Prize winners
