= List of Tasmanian locomotives =

Note: This article consists mostly of locomotives operated by the Emu Bay Railway, Tasmanian Government Railways, AN Tasrail and TasRail and the preceding private companies which were amalgamated into the TGR. Locomotives from the Mount Lyell Mining & Railway Company, North East Dundas Tramway are yet to be included.

== Steam ==
=== Emu Bay and Mount Bischoff Railway ===
- 3 locomotives

two Hunslet 4-4-0 one Neilson 0-6-4T

=== Emu Bay Railway ===
- 5 G class 4-8-2+2-8-4, purchased second-hand from Queensland Rail and Tasmanian Government Railways

=== Launceston & Western Railway ===
- 4 A class, built by Robert Stephenson & Company
- 1 A class, built by Sharp, Stewart & Company

=== Tasmanian Main Line Company ===
- 5 E class, built by Hunslet Engine Company
- 1 A+ class, built by Hunslet Engine Company
- 1 F class, built by Neilson & Company
- 3 B+ class, built by Hunslet Engine Company
- 2 D+ class, built by Dübs & Company
- 4 C+ class, built by Dübs & Company

=== Tasmanian Government Railways ===
- 1 A class, built in the TGR Workshops, Launceston
- 8 A class, built by Beyer, Peacock & Company
- 8 Ab class, built in the TGR Workshops, Launceston
- 15 B class, built by Beyer, Peacock & Company
- 28 C class 2-6-0, built by Beyer, Peacock & Company
- 6 CC class 2-6-0, built in the TGR Workshops, Launceston, modified from C class
- 4 CCS class 2-6-0, built in the TGR Workshops, Launceston, modified from CC class
- 5 D class, built by Beyer, Peacock & Company
- 8 DS class 2-6-4T, ex New Zealand Railways WF class (built by Hillside Workshops, Addington Workshops, A&G Price)
- 2 E class, built by Beyer, Peacock & Company
- 4 F class, built by James Martin & Company, purchased second-hand from South Australian Railways in 1948
- 14 G class 4-8-2+2-8-4, built by Newport Workshops, Islington Railway Workshops, Clyde Engineering
- 8 H class 4-8-2, built by Vulcan Foundry
- 2 L class 2-6-2+2-6-2, built by Beyer, Peacock & Company
- 2 M class (4-4-2+2-4-4), built by Beyer, Peacock & Company
- 10 M class 4-6-2, built by Robert Stephenson & Hawthorns
- 4 MA class 4-6-2, built in the TGR Workshops, Launceston, modified from M class
- 1 P class, built by Clyde Engineering
- 19 Q class 4-8-2, built by Perry Engineering, Walkers, Clyde Engineering
- 4 R class 4-6-2, built by Perry Engineering
- 9 SP class (steam railcars), built by Sentinel Cammell
- 6 T class, built by Walkers, purchased second-hand from South Australian Railways in 1920

=== Ex Public Works Department (Marrawah tram) ===
- Big Ben, 0-6-0 ST type, built by Baldwin Locomotive Works
- Fantail, 0-4-0 ST type, built by Baldwin Locomotive Works
- Six Wheeler, 0-6-0 ST type, built by Hudswell Clarke
- Spider, 0-4-0 WT type, built by Baldwin Locomotive Works

=== Tasmania Government Railways (2'0" Gauge) ===
- 3 G class, built by Sharp, Stewart & Company
- 4 H class, built by Krauss
- 1 J class 2-6-4-0T, built by Hagans of Erfurt
- 2 K class 0-4-0+0-4-0 built by Beyer, Peacock & Company, K1 was the world's first Garratt locomotive built

== Diesel ==
=== Emu Bay Railway ===
- 4 Emu Bay Railway 10 class (B-B), built by Tulloch and Walkers
- 7 Emu Bay Railway 11 class (B-B), built by Walkers

=== Tasmanian Government Railways ===
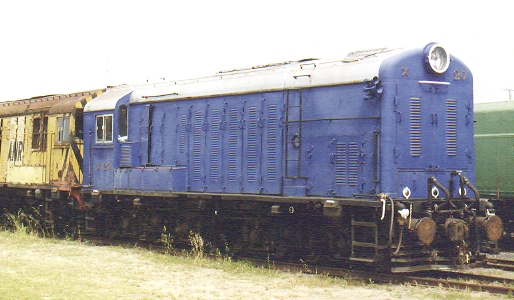
X class diesel electric locomotive as used in Tasmania, the first mainline diesel-electric locomotive purchased by an Australian government railway system

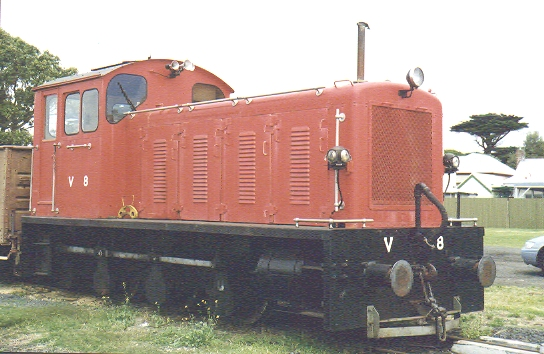
V class diesel shunting locomotive as used in Tasmania

- 13 V class (-C-), built by Vulcan Foundry, TGR Workshops
- 32 X class (Bo-Bo), built by English Electric, first main line diesel-electrics in Australia
- 6 U class (-B-), built by Malcolm Moore, TGR Workshops
- 2 W class (-C-), built by Tulloch
- 5 XA class (Bo-Bo), built in the TGR Workshops, Launceston, modified from X class
- 8 Y class (Bo-Bo), built by TGR Workshops, English Electric
- 3 VA class (-C-), built by TGR Launceston Railway Workshops
- 4 Z class (Co-Co), built by English Electric, Rocklea
- 6 ZA class (Co-Co), built by English Electric, Rocklea
- 30 DP class (railcars) (1A-2), built by Drewry Car Company, Tasmanian Government Railways & Waddingtons

=== AN Tasrail ===
- 20 830 class (Co-Co), built by AE Goodwin, Sydney transferred from Australian National, South Australia between 1980 and 1986
- 16 ZB class (Co-Co), built by English Electric, Rocklea purchased second-hand from Queensland Rail in 1986
- 45 ZC class (Co-Co), built by English Electric, Rocklea, purchased second-hand from Queensland Rail in 1988

=== TasRail ===
- 4 2050 class (Co-Co), built by Clyde Engineering, Eagle Farm, purchased second-hand from Aurizon in 2011
- 17 TasRail TR class (Co-Co), built by Progress Rail, Georgia

== See also ==
- History of rail transport in Australia
- Rail transport in Tasmania
- Railways on the West Coast of Tasmania
