= Rail transport in Tasmania =

Transport network in the Australian state

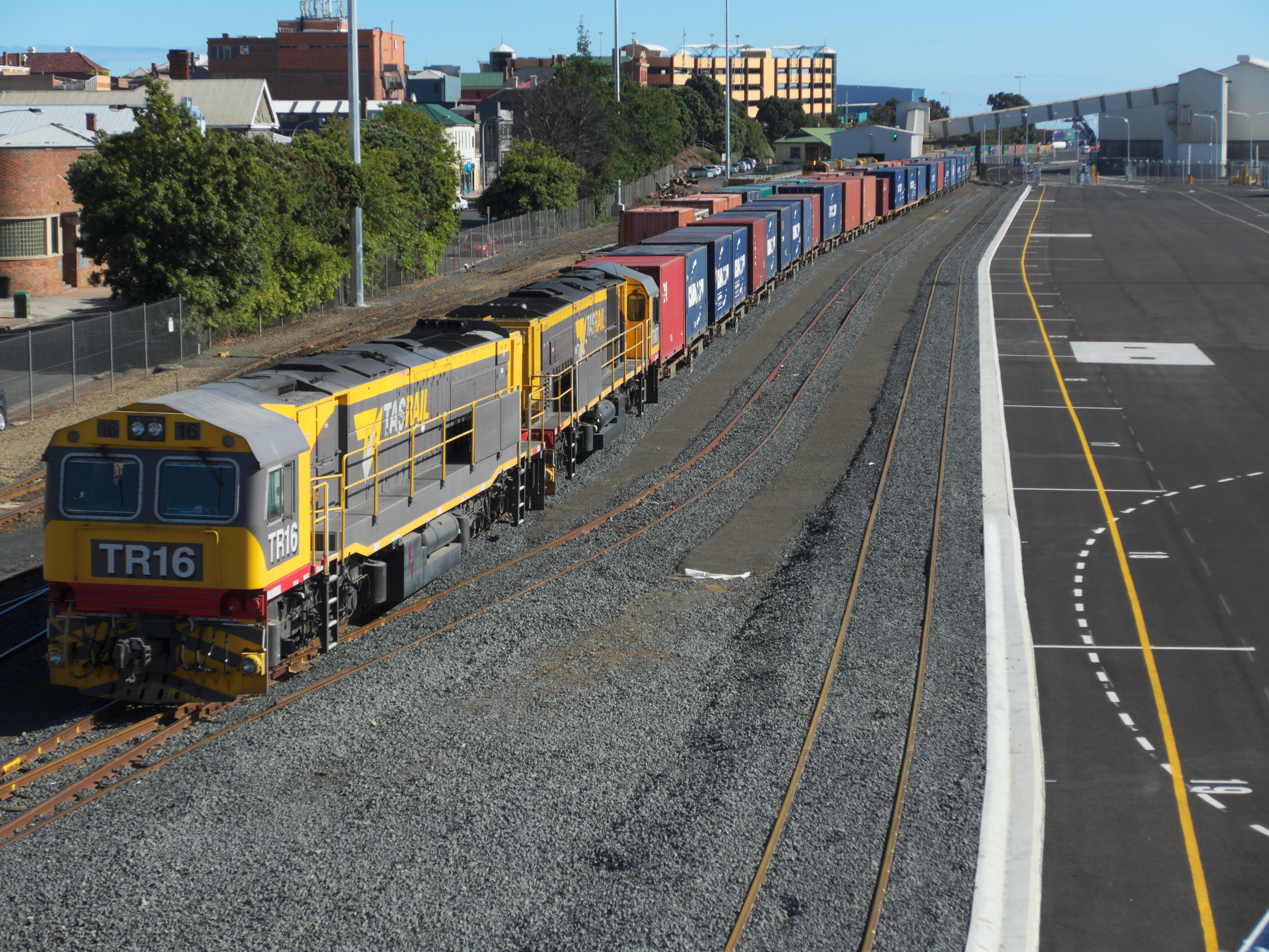
A TasRail container train led by a TR class locomotive at the port of Burnie

Rail transport in Tasmania consists of a network of narrow gauge track of 1,067 mm (3 ft 6 in) reaching virtually all cities and major towns in the island state of Tasmania, Australia. Today, rail services are focused primarily on bulk freight, with no passenger services operated. The mainline railways of Tasmania are currently operated by TasRail, a Government of Tasmania owned corporation, who owns and maintains both rolling stock, locomotives and track infrastructure.

== Traffic ==
Tasmania has a small rail system by world standards. It currently carries no regular passenger services. Freight services are supported (in part) by state government funding. The main cargo carried is cement, which is carried from Railton to the port at Devonport. Other major commodities carried are coal, logs, containers and newsprint.

== History ==
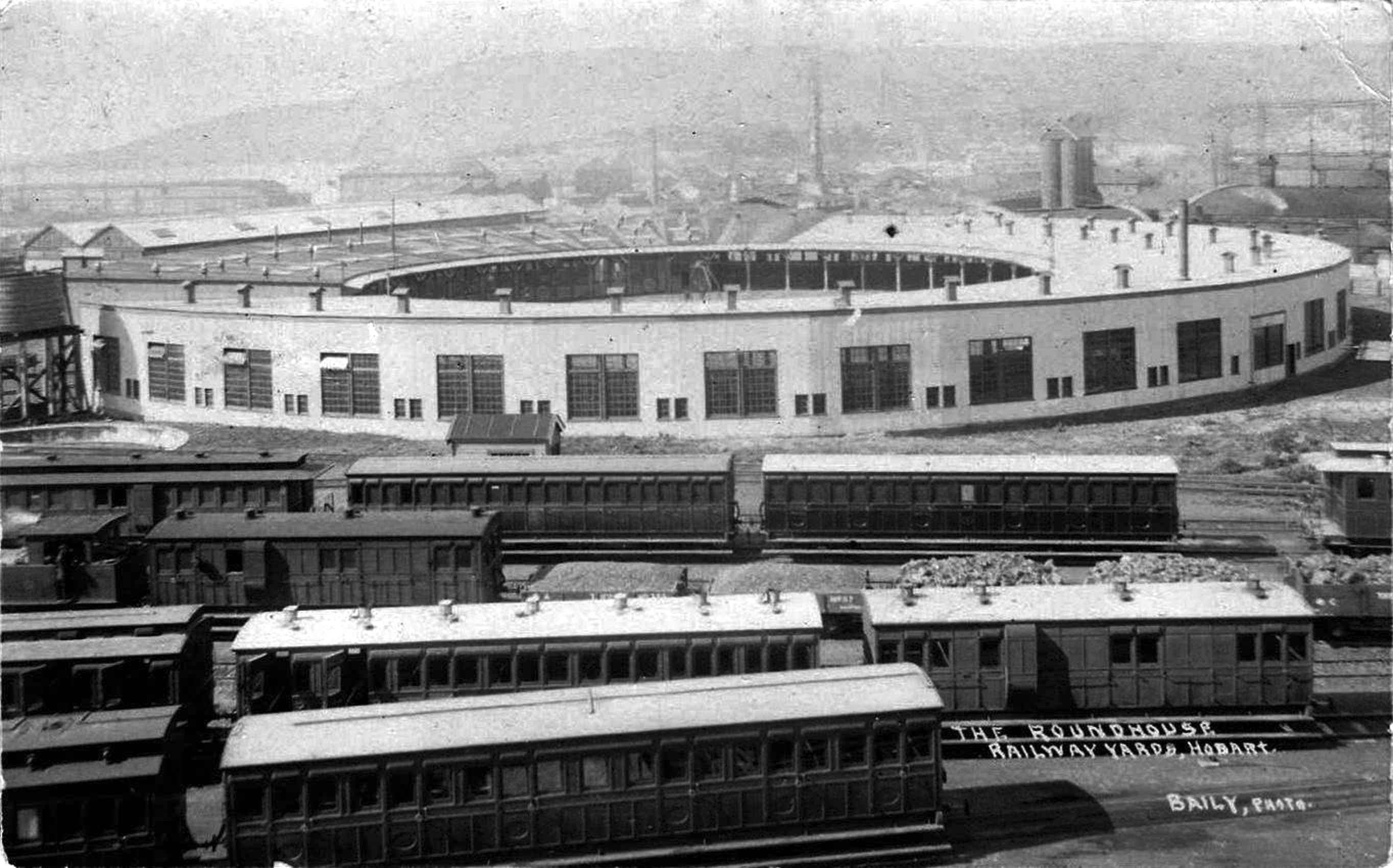
The roundhouse at Hobart's former railway station in Macquarie Point

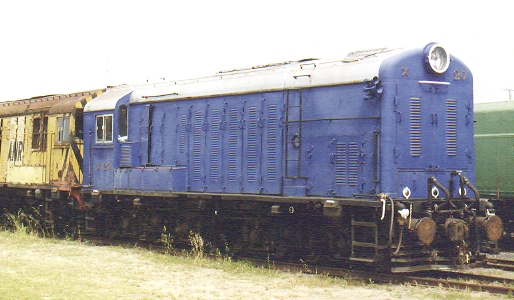
The X class was the first mainline diesel-electric locomotive purchased by an Australian government railway system

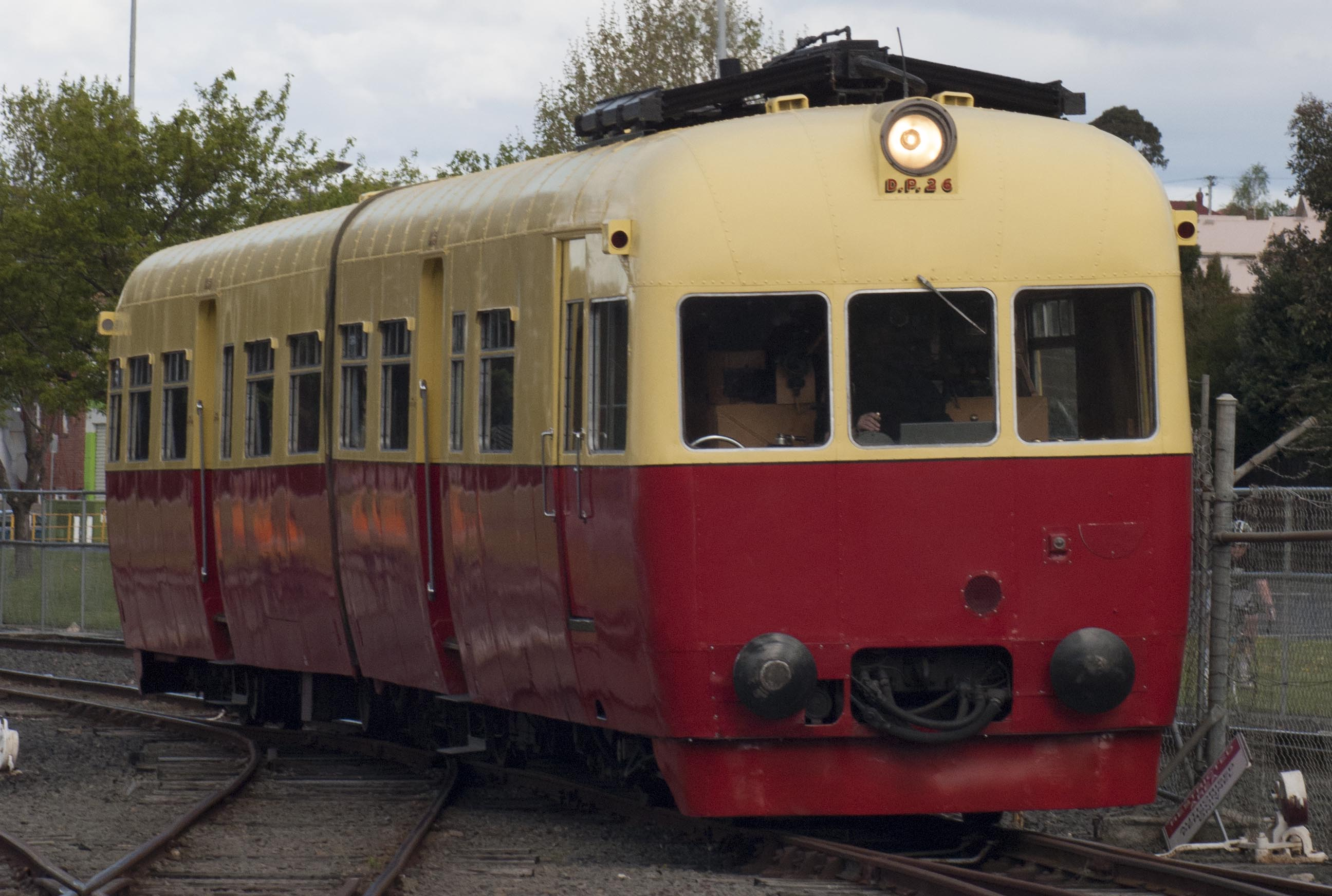
A DP class railmotor, operated by the Tasmanian Transport Museum, approaches New Town station

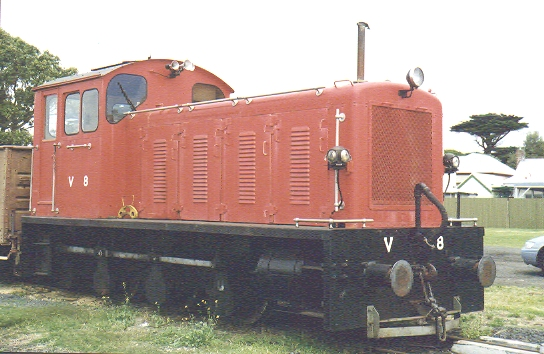
V class diesel shunting locomotive as used in Tasmania

=== Routes ===
A 5 ft 3 in (1,600 mm) railway line was opened between Deloraine and Launceston on 10 February 1871 by the private Launceston & Western Railway, on the basis of debt guarantees from landowners who stood to benefit. The line went bankrupt in 1872 and was taken over by the Government of Tasmania on 31 October 1873, which then attempted to recover the debt from the guarantors, leading to civil unrest.

On 1 March 1876, another private railway, the Tasmanian Main Line Company, which was guaranteed by the Government of Tasmania, opened a narrow gauge 3 ft 6 in (1,067 mm) line from Hobart to Evandale, near Launceston. A further extension, opened on 1 November 1876, connected with the Launceston & Western Railway at a break-of-gauge at Western Junction with the line to Deloraine, however the line between Western Junction and Launceston was made dual gauge. The line between Western Junction and Deloraine was converted to dual gauge on 17 March 1885. On 30 May 1885 the line was extended to Devonport.

The Launceston to Deloraine line was converted to solely narrow gauge on 18 August 1888, creating a single narrow gauge network. On 1 October 1890 the Tasmanian Government bought the Tasmanian Main Line Company, creating the Tasmanian Government Railways. On 15 April 1901 the Devonport line was extended to Burnie, connecting with the Emu Bay Railway's Melba line to Zeehan, which was completed on 21 December 1900. The government railway was extended to Wynyard on 1 February 1913. The line was extended to Wiltshire Junction on 12 July 1922, connecting with the already existing line between Stanley and Smithton.

Passenger services ceased in July 1978 with the withdrawal of the Tasman Limited.

=== Principal branch lines ===
- Mole Creek Line – A branch line was opened from Deloraine (Lemana Junction) to Mole Creek on 5 April 1890. This line closed on 6 February 1985.
- Scottsdale Line – Opened from Launceston to Scottsdale on 9 August 1889 and extended to Branxholm on 12 July 1911 and Herrick on 15 March 1919.
- Fingal Line – Opened from Conara Junction (on the Hobart to Launceston line) to St Marys on 29 June 1886.
- Oatlands line – Opened from Parattah to Oatlands on 13 May 1885. The line closed on 10 June 1949.
- Derwent Valley Line – Opened from Bridgewater to New Norfolk on 1 September 1887 and was extended to Glenora on 22 July 1888. The ultimate terminus of Derwent Valley line was Kallista which was reached on 6 July 1936.
- Bellerive-Sorell Line – This isolated line was built between Bellerive and Sorell on the eastern shore of the River Derwent on 2 May 1892. It closed on 30 June 1926.
- Zeehan to Strahan line – This isolated line was built between Zeehan and Regatta Point opened on 4 February 1892. The line was fully closed on 25 January 1963.
- Melrose line – Opened between Don Junction and Paloona on 10 April 1916 and extended to Barrington on 23 September 1923. The line was completely closed back to the junction on 16 October 1963, but the section from Don Junction to Don Township was reopened on 20 November 1976 by the Don River Railway.
- Bell Bay line, built between Launceston and Bell Bay opening on 17 May 1974 to access the industries established there, including shipping.

=== Emu Bay Railway ===
The earlier lines of the West Coast, Tasmania were independent of the main Tasmanian Railway system when built, but most connected to the Melba line. The North Mount Lyell railway line and a few other smaller lines were not connected to the Melba line.

The Emu Bay Railway was purchased by Australian Transport Network on 22 May 1998, thus merging that line with the remainder of the system that company then operated. Today known as the Melba line, it was excluded from the 2007 lease arrangement.

=== Operators ===
Historically, all the mainline railways were operated by the Tasmanian Government Railways, which was absorbed into the Australian National in March 1978 and renamed Tasrail. In November 1997, TasRail was sold to the Australian Transport Network, a partnership of New Zealand-based Tranz Rail and United States railroad Wisconsin Central. This sale also included a 50-year lease of the Crown land on which the Tasmanian railway network was situated. Tasrail was granted the exclusive right to use and occupy the land, but owned the infrastructure situated on that land and was obliged to maintain at its own cost.

In 2004, the railway was purchased by Pacific National following the purchase of Tranz Rail by Toll Holdings, and the sale of Wisconsin Central's overseas investments as a result of that railroad's takeover by Canadian National. In September 2005, Pacific National angered the Tasmanian and Federal governments when it threatened to withdraw all services unless the governments paid a $100 million subsidy. That was alarming, because a shut-down of all rail services would result in thousands more trucks on already busy roads.

Initially, neither the federal or state government acted on the issue. Later, the state infrastructure minister Bryan Green and his federal counterpart, transport minister Warren Truss, announced a $120 million rescue package, designed to ensure that Pacific National would continue operation in the state.

In May 2007, the Tasmanian Government, the Federal Government and Pacific National came to an agreement regarding the funding, ownership and operation of the Tasmanian railway network. The Government of Tasmania would acquire the railway infrastructure previously leased to Pacific National. Pacific National would continue to provide rail services on the network. The Federal Government's AusLink program provided $78 million in funding for capital works. The Tasmanian Government also agreed to provide $4 million funding each year for maintenance.

In September 2009, the Tasmanian Government and Pacific National entered into an agreement for sale of the Tasmanian rail business, with rail infrastructure and railway operations to be maintained, managed and owned by a new government owned rail company, TasRail.

== Rolling stock ==
TasRail has operated the mainline railways in Tasmania since 2009 and provides freight service across the state. As at October 2024, it operated four 2050 class, seven DQ class and 17 TR class locomotives.

=== Heritage operators ===
The following table lists railways and museums which run vintage passenger trains and rolling stock:

Name	Image	Location	Website
Launceston Tramway Museum		Invermay, Launceston	
Don River Railway		Don, Devonport	
Redwater Creek Steam Railway		Sheffield	
Wee Georgie Wood Railway		Tullah	
West Coast Wilderness Railway		Regatta Point	
Derwent Valley Railway		New Norfolk	
Tasmanian Transport Museum		Glenorchy, Hobart (based at New Town station)	
Ida Bay Railway		Ida Bay	
