= Queensland Railways 2370 class =

Australian diesel-electric locomotives

Type and origin
- Power type: Diesel-electric
- Builder: English Electric, Rocklea
- Serial number: A.274 to A.277
- Build date: 1975
- Total produced: 4
Specifications
- Configuration
  - UIC: Co-Co
- Gauge: 1,067 mm (3 ft 6 in)
- Wheel diameter: 3 ft 1 1/2 in (0.953 m)
- Wheelbase: 38 ft 6 in (11.735 m) total, 12 ft 6 in (3.810 m) bogie
- Length: 52 ft 9 in (16.078 m) over headstocks
- Width: 9 ft 3 in (2.819 m)
- Height: 12 ft 5 1/8 in (3.788 m)
- Axle load: 15 long tons (15.2 t; 16.8 short tons)
- Loco weight: 90 long tons (91.4 t; 100.8 short tons)
- Fuel type: Diesel
- Fuel capacity: 1,500 imp gal (6,800 L)
- Prime mover: English Electric 12CSVT Mk III
- RPM range: 900rpm
- Engine type: four stroke, four valves per cylinder
- Aspiration: turbocharged, intercooled
- Alternator: Toyo WD10314A
- Traction motors: English Electric 548
- Cylinders: 12 Vee
- Cylinder size: 10 in × 12 in (254 mm × 305 mm)
- MU working: 110V, stepless electro-pneumatic throttle
- Loco brake: Air, dynamic
- Train brakes: Air
Performance figures
- Maximum speed: 50 miles per hour (80 km/h)
- Power output: 2,550 hp (1,900 kW) gross, 2,350 hp (1,750 kW) net
Career
- Operators: Queensland Railways
- Number in class: 4
- Numbers: 2370-2373
- First run: March 1973
- Current owner: Don River Railway
- Disposition: 1 Preserved, 3 scrapped

The 2370 class were a class of diesel locomotive built in 1975 by English Electric, Rocklea for Queensland Railways in Australia. All were later sold to AN Tasrail along with the 2350 class, and reclassified as the ZB class. The sole survivor, now numbered 2128 (ex-ZB14, formerly 2371) is now preserved at Don River Railway

== History ==
The 2370 class was an evolution of the 2350 class. They were built for use on the Blackwater and Moura coal lines and based at Gladstone. The class became surplus following electrification of the coal lines and in 1987 were all sold to AN Tasrail where they all entered service as the ZB class. They were very similar to the Tasrail Za class.

In 2003, one was sold to South Spur Rail Services and shipped to Western Australia to operate infrastructure trains, it is now owned by Greentrains.
