= Tasmanian Government Railways B class =

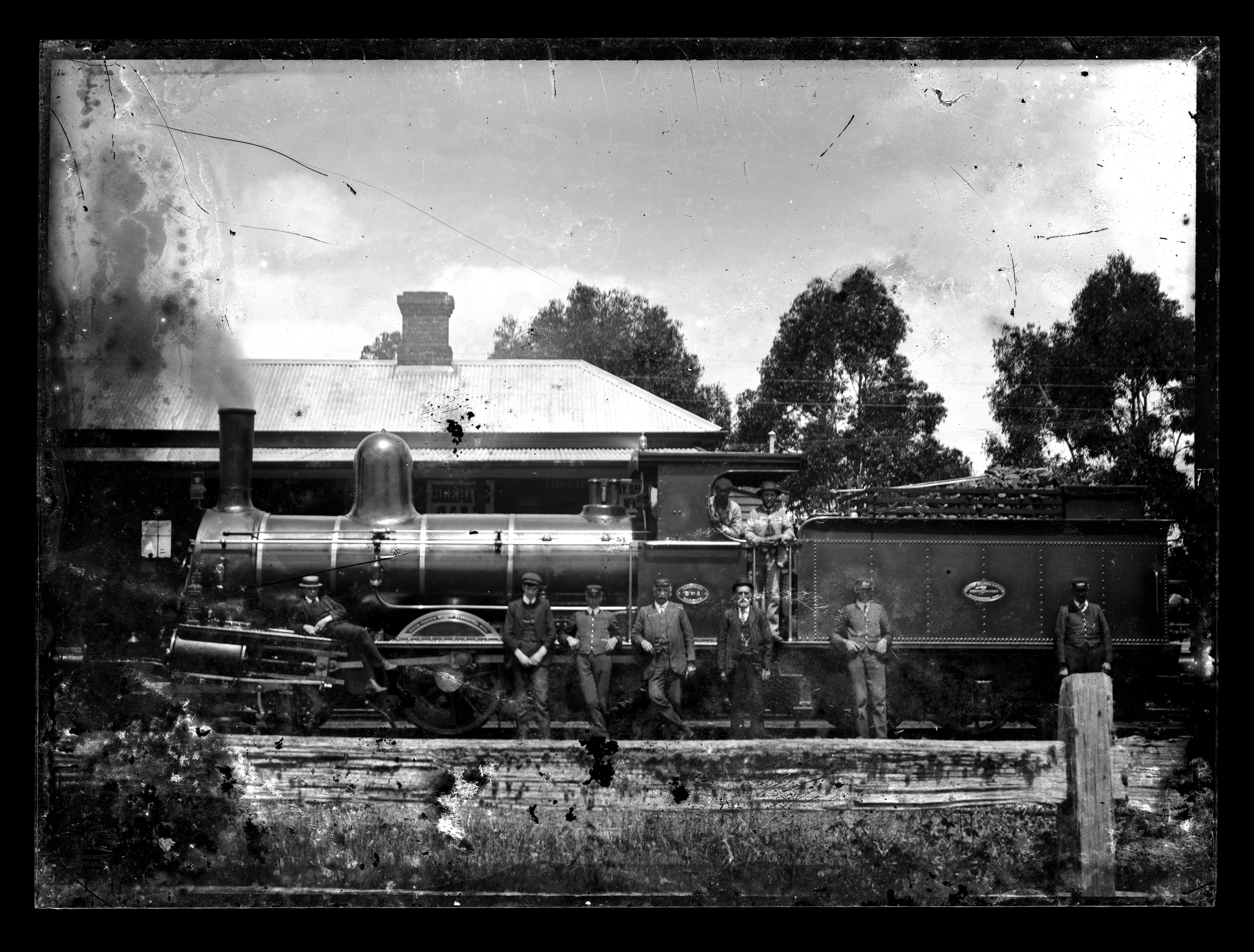
- B5
Type and origin
- Power type: Steam
- Builder: Beyer, Peacock & Company
- Serial number: 2510, 2511, 2615-2618, 2692-2694, 2771-2772, 2830, 3129-3131
- Build date: 1884-1892
- Total produced: 15
Specifications
- Configuration
  - Whyte: 4-4-0
- Gauge: 1,067 mm (3 ft 6 in)
- Driver dia.: 4 ft 0 in (1,219 mm)
- Total weight: 45 long tons 0 cwt (100,800 lb or 45.7 t)
- Fuel type: Coal
- Boiler pressure: 140 lbf/in^{2} (0.97 MPa)
- Cylinder size: 14.5 in × 20 in (368 mm × 508 mm)
Performance figures
- Tractive effort: 8,912 lbf (39.64 kN)
Career
- Operators: Tasmanian Government Railways
- Numbers: B1-B15
- Disposition: All scrapped

The Tasmanian Government Railways B class was a class of 4-4-0 steam locomotives operated by the Tasmanian Government Railways.

== History ==
Between 1884 and 1892, the Tasmanian Government Railways took delivery of 15 B class locomotives from Beyer, Peacock & Company, Manchester. With the arrival of the Q class in 1936, five were retired. The remaining ten were withdrawn in the early 1950s following the arrival of the X class.
