= Tasmanian Government Railways C class =

Class of Australian locomotives

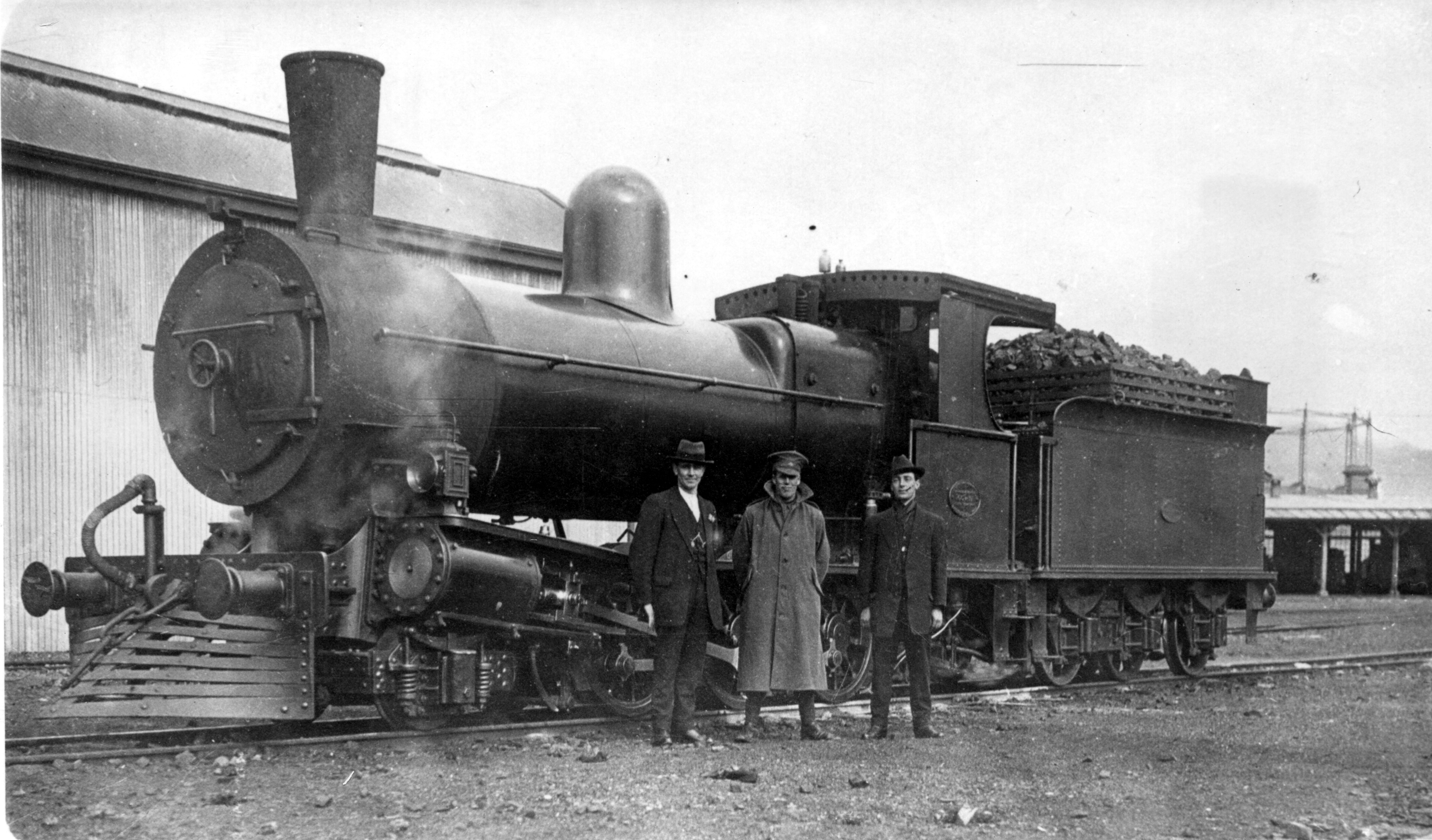
- CC17 in Hobart
Type and origin
- Power type: Steam
- Builder: Beyer, Peacock & Company
- Build date: 1885-1907
- Total produced: 27
Specifications
- Configuration
  - Whyte: 2-6-0
- Gauge: 1,067 mm (3 ft 6 in)
- Driver dia.: 3 ft 3 in (991 mm)
- Total weight: 42 long tons 0 cwt (94,100 lb or 42.7 t)-47 long tons 0 cwt (105,300 lb or 47.8 t)
- Fuel type: Coal
- Boiler pressure: 140 lbf/in^{2} (0.97 MPa)-145 lbf/in^{2} (1.00 MPa)
- Cylinder size: 14.5 in × 20 in (368 mm × 508 mm)
Performance figures
- Tractive effort: 12,507 lbf (55.63 kN)
Career
- Operators: Tasmanian Government Railways
- Numbers: C1-C28
- Preserved: C1, C22, CCS23, CCS25
- Disposition: 4 preserved, 24 scrapped

The Tasmanian Government Railways C class is a class of 2-6-0 steam locomotives operated by the Tasmanian Government Railways.

== History ==
Between 1885 and 1892, the Tasmanian Government Railways took delivery of 19 C class locomotives from Beyer, Peacock & Company, Manchester. A further eight followed in the early years of the 20th century. A 28th originally built for the Emu Bay Railway was purchased second hand in 1937. They were the first of what became almost an Australian 3 ft 6 in (1,067 mm) standard, as locomotives of similar design served in large numbers as the Silverton Tramway Y class, South Australian Railways Y class and Western Australian Government Railways G class, and also in Queensland and on the North Australia Railway.

In 1912, six (16-19, 26 & 27) were rebuilt with new cylinders, Belpaire boilers and larger smokeboxes and reclassified as the CC class. In 1924, a further four (21, 23-25) were rebuilt also receiving Walschaerts valve gear and reclassified as the CCS class.

In 1948, a further seven locomotives of the same design were purchased from the Commonwealth Railways. These had originally been built as South Australian Railways Y class locomotives and sold to the Commonwealth Railways to operate North Australia Railway services in World War II. Four entered service as the F class, with the other three used for parts.

== Preservation ==
Four have been preserved:

- C1 at the West Coast Pioneers Museum, Zeehan
- C22 at the Tasmanian Transport Museum, Glenorchy restored to service 1983, withdrawn for overhaul 1999 returned to service November 2009
- CCS23 at the Don River Railway, Devonport
- CCS25 at the Don River Railway, Devonport
