= Queensland 4D9 class locomotive =

Queensland Railways 4D9 class
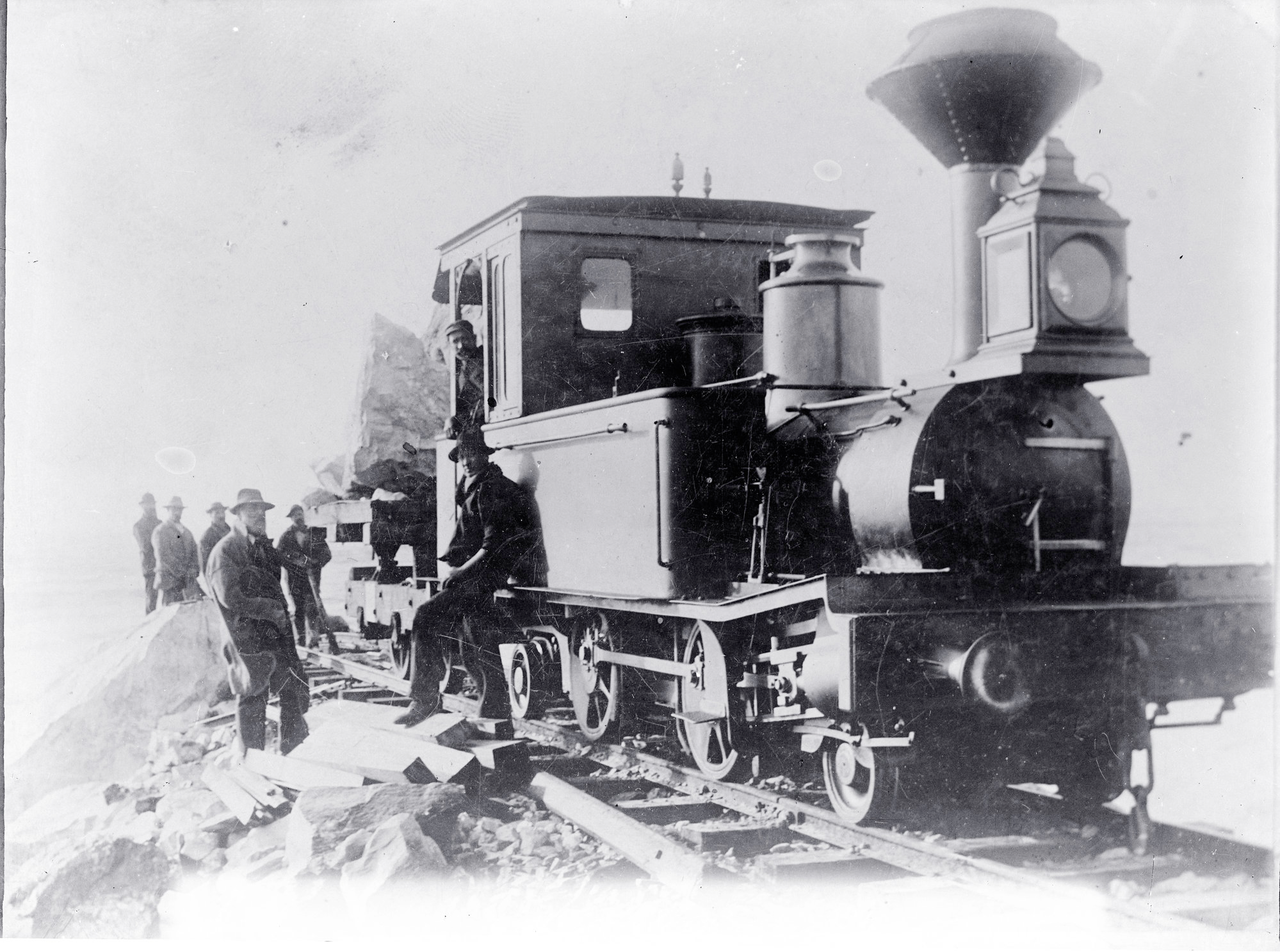
- 4D9 class used for Macquarie Harbour breakwater construction, Tasmania.
Type and origin
- Power type: Steam
- Builder: Dübs & Co
- Serial number: 1414, 1415
- Build date: 1881
- Total produced: 2
Specifications
- Configuration
  - Whyte: 2-4-2T
- Gauge: 1,067 mm (3 ft 6 in)
- Fuel type: Coal
- Cylinders: 2 outside
- Cylinder size: 9 in × 15 in (229 mm × 381 mm)
Career
- Operators: Queensland Railways
- Numbers: 1, 131
- Preserved: 131
- Disposition: 1 preserved, 1 scrapped

The Queensland Railways 4D9 class locomotive was a class of 2-4-2T steam locomotives operated by the Queensland Railways.

== History ==
In February 1881, two Dübs & Co two 2-4-2T locomotives entered service on the Bundaberg Railway. Per Queensland Railway's classification system they were designated the 4D9 class, the 4 representing the number of driving wheels, the D that it was a tank locomotive, and the 9 the cylinder diameter in inches.

== Class list ==
Works number	Bundaberg Railway number	Southern & Western Railway number	Queensland Railways number	In service	Notes
1414	1	1	1	February 1881	Sold July 1895 to Bingarra Sugar Mill
1415	2		131	February 1881	Sold August 1894 to CSR, Childers, resold to Public Works Department, Tasmania for Macquarie Harbour breakwater construction, sold May 1941 to sawmiller R Howard, Zeehan, currently statically displayed by Don River Railway
