= Don River Railway =

Heritage railway and museum in Devonport, Tasmania

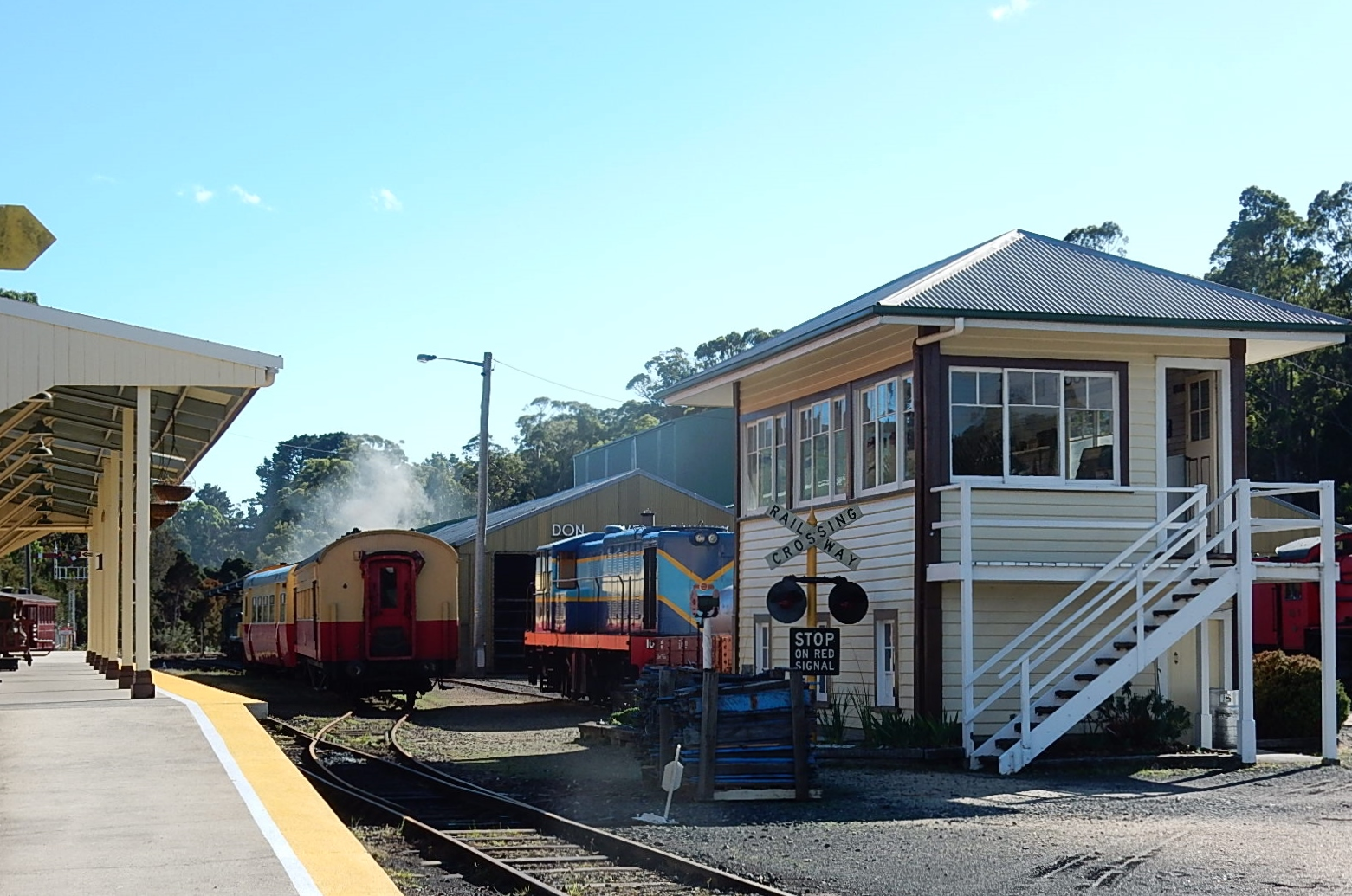
- Don River Railway Museum in 2016
- Locale: Devonport, Tasmania
- Coordinates: 41.18103°S 146.31814°E
- Connections: Western line

Commercial operations
- Name: Don River Railway
- Original gauge: 1,067 mm (3 ft 6 in)

Preserved operations
- Owned by: Van Diemen Light Railway Society
- Operated by: Van Diemen Light Railway Society
- Stations: 2
- Length: 3.1 km (1.9 mi)
- Preserved gauge: 1,067 mm (3 ft 6 in)

Commercial history
- Opened: 10 April 1916
- Closed: 16 October 1963

Website
- www.donriverrailway.com.au

The Don River Railway is a heritage railway and museum in Don, Devonport, Tasmania. It operates a service from Don to Coles Beach (operationally known as Don Junction). The current line follows a reconstructed section of the former Melrose line that ran between Don Junction and Paloona.

The Don River Railway is open seven days a week, closing only for Christmas Day, Good Friday, and Anzac Day. Train services operate from Thursday to Sunday, using either a Tasmanian Government Railways DP class rail car, or a heritage carriage set hauled by either a steam locomotive or a vintage diesel locomotive.

== History ==
The heritage operations consist of the northernmost stretch of the Melrose line that ran from Don Junction (commonly called Coles Beach) to Melrose and Paloona. In the 1920s, the line was extended to Barrington, but this closed in 1928. Occasional trains ran on the closed section on Devonport Cup and Show days, but this ceased in 1935. The Melrose-Paloona section closed around this time, and following the 1948 closure of BHP's limestone facilities at Melrose, which had been the mainstay of operations on the line ever since it opened, the line was largely redundant. In October 1963, the railway was closed and later lifted.

The Van Dieman Light Rail Society was formed in December 1971. In 1973, it began pushing to restore heritage operation, which it did three years later operated, under the trading name Don River Railway.

In May 1987, it began operating main line services to Burnie. On 14 December 1991, the line was officially opened by the Governor of Tasmania, Phillip Bennett. Services originally ran into the main line Devonport station on the Western line before services were curtailed to operate between Don and Coles Beach.

On 4 April 2023, a fire destroyed a carriage shed and some carriages.

The Don River Railway complex is listed on the Tasmanian Heritage Register for its historic cultural heritage significance in Tasmania.

== Steam locomotives ==
Fowler no. 5268 is Don River Rail's sole operating steam locomotive as of December 2024, seeing occasional use both on timetabled services and for functions.

Former Tasmanian Government Railways M4 is currently receiving mechanical overhall. CCS25 was reactivated in January 2023, but awaits approval to return to revenue operations.

Builder	Builder's number and year	Class	Configuration	Original number	Final number/name	Previous owner	Condition	Additional information
Baldwin Locomotive Works	Unknown	DS	2-6-4T	Unknown	Unknown	Tasmanian Government Railways	Boiler only	
Beyer, Peacock & Company	3392 of 1892	A	4-4-0	A4		Launceston City Council	Dismantled	
Beyer Peacock	4415 of 1902	C	2-6-0	CCS23	CCS23	AN Tasrail	Cosmetic restoration only	Rebuilt 1928 by Tasmanian Government Railways
Beyer Peacock	4417 of 1902	C	2-6-0	CCS25	CCS25	AN Tasrail	Mechanical overhaul Underway	Rebuilt 1926 by Tasmanian Government Railways
Dübs & Company	1415 of 1880	4D9	2-4-2T	131		Tasmanian Transport Commission	Dismantled	
Dübs & Company	3855 of 1900		2-8-0	No.8 Heemskirk		Emu Bay Railway	Mechanical and Boiler Overhaul	Returned to service October 1996
John Fowler & Company	5265 of 1886		0-6-0T			Tasmanian Transport Commission	Operational	
Vulcan Foundry	5955 of 1951	H	4-8-2	H7		Tasmanian Government Railways	Static	
Robert Stephenson & Hawthorns	7422 of 1951	M	4-6-2	M2	MA4	Tasmanian Government Railways	Static	Modified and renumbered 1958
Robert Stephenson & Hawthorns	7423 of 1951	M	4-6-2	M3		AN Tasrail	Static	
Robert Stephenson & Hawthorns	7424 of 1951	M	4-6-2	M4		AN Tasrail	Mechanical overhaul	
Robert Stephenson & Hawthorns	7428 of 1951	M	4-6-2	M1	MA2	Tasmanian Government Railways	Cosmetic restoration only	Modified and renumbered 1957

== Diesel locomotives ==
Builder	Builder's number	Class	Configuration	Original number	Final number	Previous owner	Condition	Additional information
Ruston & Hornsby, Boultham Works	279571	40DL	B			Cornwall Coal Company	Operational	Nicknamed 'Spit and Giggle'
Ruston & Hornsby, Boultham Works	187072	48DL	B			Mount Lyell Mining & Railway Company	Operational	
AE Goodwin	84712	830	Co-Co	866		AN Tasrail	Operational	
Walkers	577	10	B'B'	1002		Australian Transport Network	Operational	
Malcolm Moore		U	B	U6		AN Tasrail	Operational	Rebuilt by Launceston Railway Workshops
Vulcan Foundry	22288 / D61	V	C	V2		AN Tasrail	Operational	
English Electric, Vulcan Foundry	1799 / D91	X	Bo-Bo	X4		AN Tasrail	Mechanical overhaul	
Tasmanian Government Railways, Launceston Railway Workshops		Y	Bo-Bo	Y6		AN Tasrail	Operational	
Tasmanian Government Railways, Launceston Railway Workshops		Y	Bo-Bo	Y8		AN Tasrail	Static	
English Electric, Rocklea	A.250	Z	Co-Co	Z2	2111	TasRail	Static	
English Electric, Rocklea	A.251	Z	Co-Co	Z3	2112	TasRail	Mechanical overhaul	
English Electric, Rocklea	A.259	Za	Co-Co	ZA1	2114	TasRail	Mechanical overhaul	
English Electric, Rocklea	A.264	2350	Co-Co	2358	2100	TasRail	Static	Ex ZB9 / ZR1 / ZP1, rebuilt by Australian National Railways, Port Augusta
English Electric, Rocklea	A.275	2370	Co-Co	2371	2128	TasRail	Mechanical overhaul	Ex ZB14
