= Tasmanian Transport Museum =

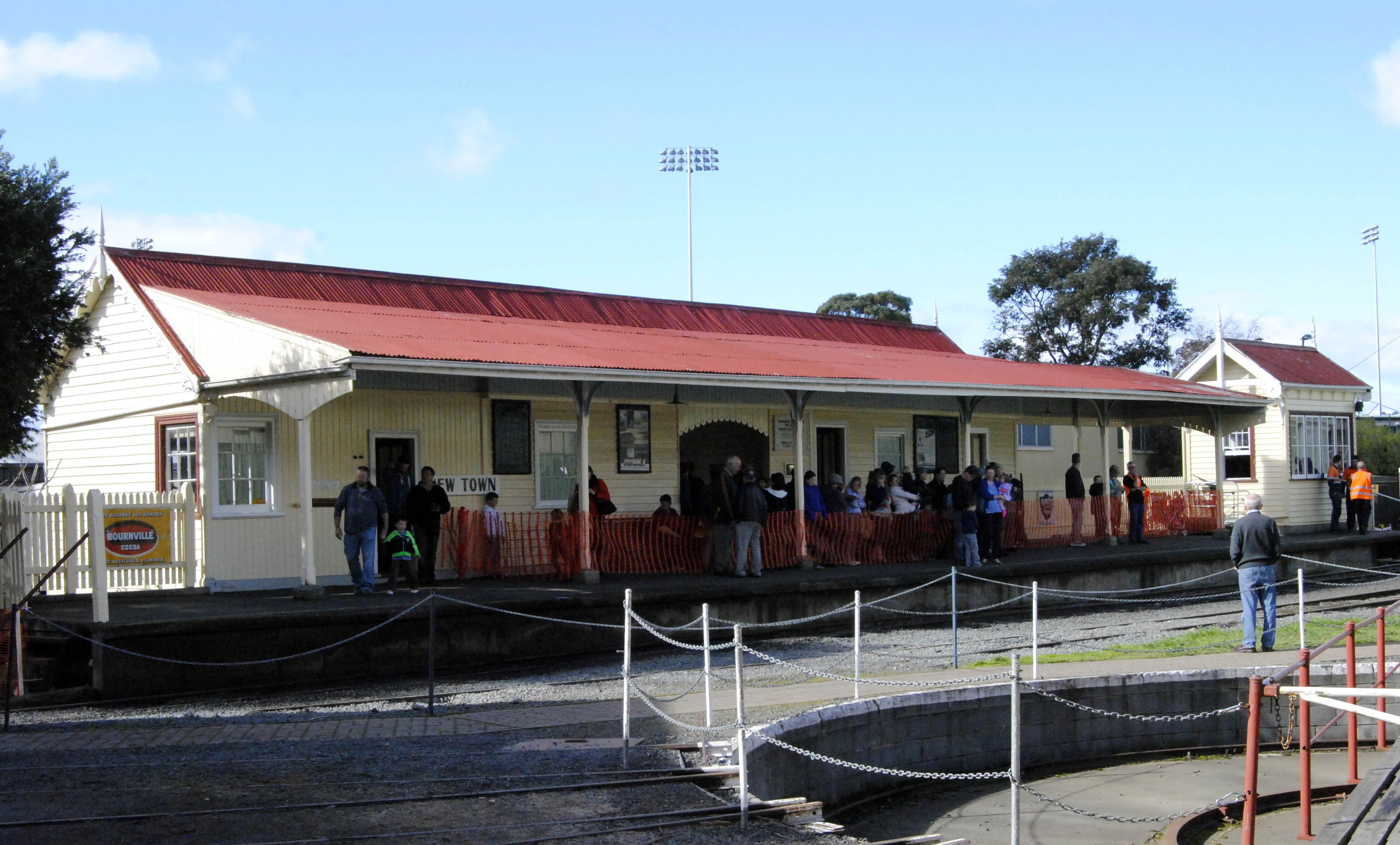
- The station building and railway platform
- Established: 3 December 1983
- Location: 2B Anfield Street; Glenorchy, Tasmania
- Coordinates: 42.831242°S 147.274754°E
- Type: Transport museum
- President: Phil Lange
- Public transit access: Metro Tasmania - Glenorchy bus station
- Website: tasmaniantransportmuseum.com.au

The Tasmanian Transport Museum is a transport museum in Glenorchy, Tasmania, Australia preserving and exhibiting a collection relating to Tasmanian transport history including items such as locomotives, carriages, ephemera and railwayana.

== History ==
In 1960, the Metropolitan Transport Trust donated a Hobart tram to be preserved, and as a result the Tasmanian Transport Museum Society was founded in 1962, with the aim of preserving representative items of transport interest that were disappearing from everyday life.

The first decade of the society's existence saw the preservation of many items that had been donated or purchased, and it was not until 1972 that a site adjacent to the railway station in Glenorchy was leased from the Glenorchy City Council. After the laying of track, the first items were moved there in 1976.

After this time, the museum prospered in building on the site, with an electric traction shed built in 1976, as well as the Steam Technology building in 1983, a carriage shed in 1984 and a roundhouse in 1986. The most recent additions to the museum include a Fire Services shed completed in 2004, and a Road Transport shed completed in 2013.

In 1979, after the cessation of passenger train services in Tasmania, the museum purchased and moved the former New Town railway station building to the site in sections, and this was completed in 1980. The museum also acquired a railway turntable from Brighton and a signal cabin from the Botanical Gardens railway halt.

The society has steadily acquired an extensive array of exhibits, relics, models and photographs, that portray many facets of the history of Tasmanian transport. society members also have carried out much of the development work on exhibits and the site, with the State Government being the major financial contributor for capital works, however; membership is small and the society relies mainly on volunteers, due to the financial and time constraints on the museum.

In February 2021, a lease for five kilometres (3.1 mi) of the South line from Glenorchy to Berriedale was agreed with the Government of Tasmania.

In May 2023, the society reopened a one-kilometre (0.6 mi) section of the line between Elwick and Grove roads, allowing for the operation of both steam engines and railcars.

== Exhibits ==
All items from this list were attained from

=== Railway locomotives ===
Number & name	Description	History & current status	Livery	Owner(s)	Built	Acquired	Photograph
C22	Mixed traffic, 2-6-0 steam locomotive	Operational	TGR black	Tasmanian Government Railways	1902	1967	
Climax B-type	Climax type, B-B steam locomotive	Statically restored		Australian Newsprint Mills	1923	1977	
H1	Mainline goods, 4-8-2 steam locomotive	Statically restored	TGR green	Tasmanian Government Railways	1951	1974	
M5	Mainline passenger, 4-6-2 steam locomotive	Operational (Mainline)	TGR green	Tasmanian Government Railways	1952	1974	
Abt No. 2	General purpose, 0-4-2T rack steam locomotive	Statically restored	Green	Mount Lyell Mining & Railway Company, sold to West Coast Wilderness Railway in 2019	1889	1968	
Q5	Mainline goods, 4-8-2 steam locomotive	Statically restored	TGR green	Tasmanian Government Railways	1922	1965	
Ruston	Shunting, diesel-mechanical locomotive	Operational	EBR blue and yellow	Emu Bay Railway	1950	1998	
Markham & Co. Vertical Boiler	Logging tramway, 0-4-0 steam locomotive	Statically restored			1889	1983	
X1	General purpose, Bo-Bo diesel-electric locomotive	Operational	TGR red & cream	Tasmanian Government Railways	1950	1989	
Y4	General purpose, Bo-Bo diesel-electric locomotive	Operational (mainline)	TGR red & cream	Tasmanian Government Railways	1964	1994	
Za6	Co-Co			TasRail	1976		

=== Railmotors ===
Number & name	Description	History & current status	Livery	Owner(s)	Built	Acquired	Photograph
DP15	Country and suburban passenger railmotor	Under overhaul	TGR green & cream	Tasmanian Government Railways	1939	1979	
DP26	Articulated country passenger railmotor	Operational	TGR red & cream	Tasmanian Government Railways	1950	1979	
PT4	Driving railmotor trailer	Stored	TGR red & cream	Tasmanian Government Railways	1939	1979	

== Engineering heritage award ==
The museum collection received an Engineering Heritage Marker from Engineers Australia as part of its Engineering Heritage Recognition Program.
