= Dübs and Company =

Scottish locomotive manufacturer, 1863–1903

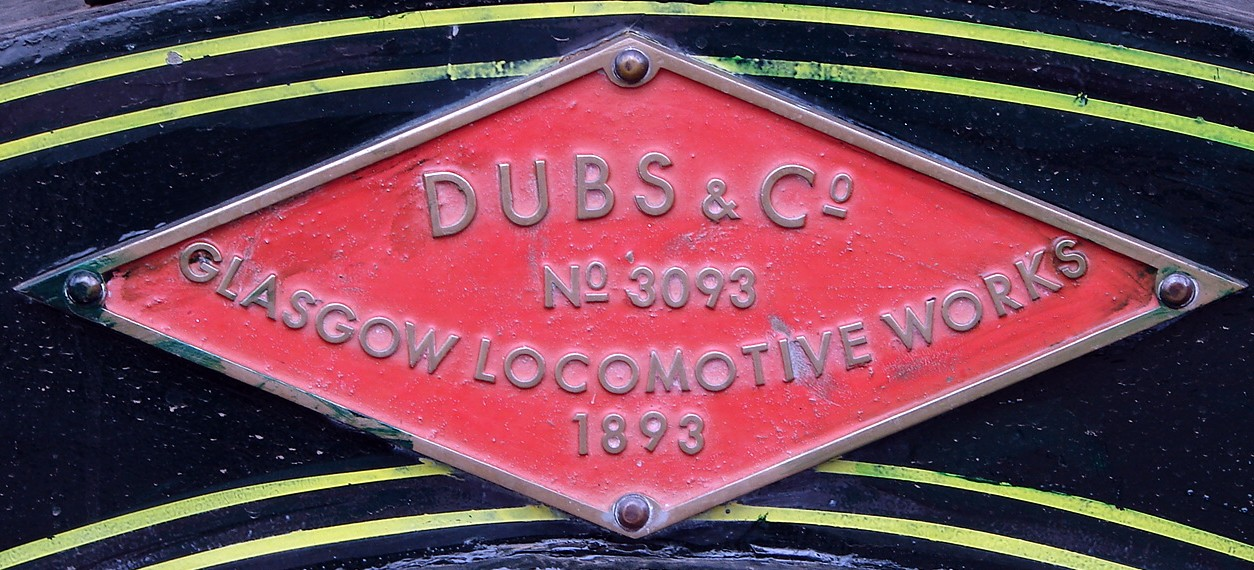
SAR Class 6 439 (4-6-0) builder's plate

Dübs & Co. was a locomotive manufacturer in Glasgow, Scotland, founded by Henry Dübs in 1863 and based at the Queens Park Works in Polmadie. In 1903 it amalgamated with two other Glasgow locomotive manufacturers to create the North British Locomotive Company.

== Preserved locomotives ==
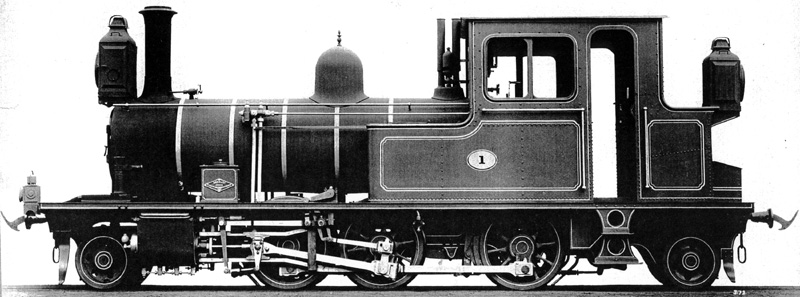
NSB locomotive class XXI number 1 photographed at Dübs & Co. Locomotive Works before delivery to the Setesdal Line. Photograph by Dübs & Co., 1894.

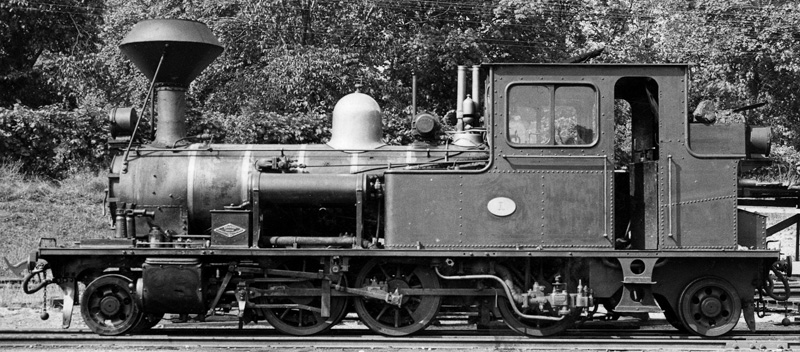
NSB locomotive class XXI number 1 photographed at Kristiansand station in August, 1938. Photograph by Jim Jarvis. Note the spark arresting chimney, the electric lighting, the air brake reservoir and the injector.

Eleven locomotives built for the New Zealand Railways Department, numerous others in South Africa and the Isle of Man.

=== Preserved locomotives in New Zealand ===
Four members of the 0-4-0 A class built in 1873 have been preserved. A 64 and A 67 are in full operational condition on vintage railways; A 64 resides at The Plains Vintage Railway & Historical Museum in Ashburton. A 67 is owned and operated by the Ocean Beach Railway / Otago Railway & Locomotive Society Inc, while A 62 is in private ownership and it is understood that the smokebox has been snapped from the boiler. A 66 (also owned by the Ocean Beach Railway) was damaged by fire when the building in which it was kept on static display was burnt down, it is now on long term lease to a Southland preservation railway.

Two members of the C class have survived (only five of the 16 locomotives were built by Dübs). Currently in operation at the Silver Stream Railway is an example from 1875 that originally had the wheel arrangement of 0-4-0 but was converted soon after purchase to 0-4-2 and is preserved with that wheel arrangement. Another member of the C class, 803, was recovered by the Westport Railway Preservation Society in 1993 from where it had been dumped in the Buller Gorge, West Coast, and was under restoration with the goal of returning it to a fully operational state. It was moved from Westport to the National Railway Museum of New Zealand in 2024.

Five members of the 0-6-0 F class built between 1878 and 1880 have been preserved. Currently in operational condition are F 163 and F 185. F 111 had its boiler condemned in 1980 and its owners, the Ocean Beach Railway, have yet to replace it; the Ocean Beach Railway also owns F 150 but it was leased to the Plains Vintage Railway of Ashburton in 1986 where it was unrestored and partially dismantled. In July 2019 it was transported to Invercargill where the Southern Steam Train Charitable Trust is having it restored for occasional use. This is expected to be completed by 2026. F 230 was converted to a wheel arrangement of 0-4-2 on a private industrial line and is on static display at Hamilton Lake Park in a somewhat rundown condition. Other members of the 88-total F class that still exist were built by other manufacturers.

=== Preserved locomotives in Australia ===
The oldest steam locomotive in Tasmania is Dübs No.1415 of 1880. It is a Queensland 4D9 class locomotive and was built to run on Queensland Railways' 3 ft 6 in (1,067 mm) gauge. In 1917 the locomotive was sold to the Strahan Marine Board on Tasmania's West Coast, where it was employed in the construction of the breakwater at Hells Gates at the entrance to Macquarie Harbour. The locomotive is now on display (minus cab) at the Don River Railway.

On Sunday, 30 December 1900, the Emu Bay Railway (EBR) took delivery of three Dübs 4-8-0 locomotives to run on the 3 ft 6 in (1,067 mm) Melba line from Burnie to Zeehan. The locomotives were EBR Nos. 6 (3854/1900), 7 (3856/1900) and 8 (3855/1900). No.7 was taken out of service in 1959 and scrapped in 1963. In 1960 No.6 was named Murchsion and No.8 was named Heemskirk and both locomotives were repainted from drab black to a striking two tone blue livery to haul the new Westcoaster train, which transported buses and cars (and their occupants) from Burnie to Rosebery. No.6 is now on display at the West Coast Pioneers Museum at Zeehan, where its drab black (2006) has recently (2013) been replaced by the striking blue livery mentioned above. No.8 is preserved (in black) in running order at the Don River Railway preservation society at Devonport, Tasmania.

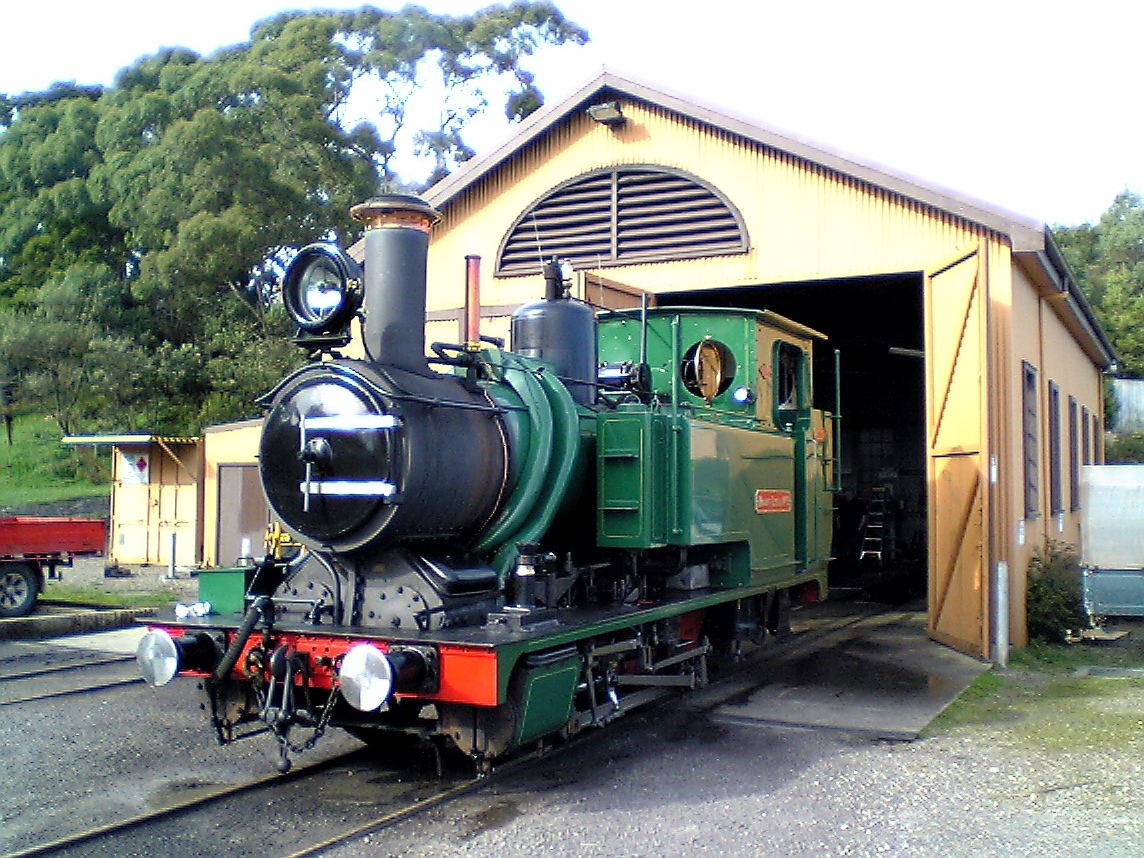
West Coast Wilderness Railway no. 3730, built in 1898, leaving the shed at Strahan, Tasmania in September 2009

Mount Lyell Mining & Railway Company purchased five 0-4-2RT (rack tank) locomotives to run on their 3 ft 6 in (1,067 mm) gauge railway from Queenstown, Tasmania to Strahan, Tasmania, Australia, using the Abt Rack railway system. The first four of these were built by Dübs and the first three are still in existence. Mount Lyell No.1 (3369/1896) and Mount Lyell No.3 (3730/1898) operate on the West Coast Wilderness Railway. The third example, Mount Lyell No.2 (3594/1898) has now also been restored and operates on the West Coast Wilderness Railway.

No. 3730, built in 1898, is used by the West Coast Wilderness Railway between Strahan and Queenstown. It was locally fitted for the Abt Rack railway system.

Victorian Railways No. 2 steam crane, built 1890 by Dubs, works number 2711, is on display at the Newport Railway Museum, Melbourne.

=== Preserved locomotives elsewhere ===
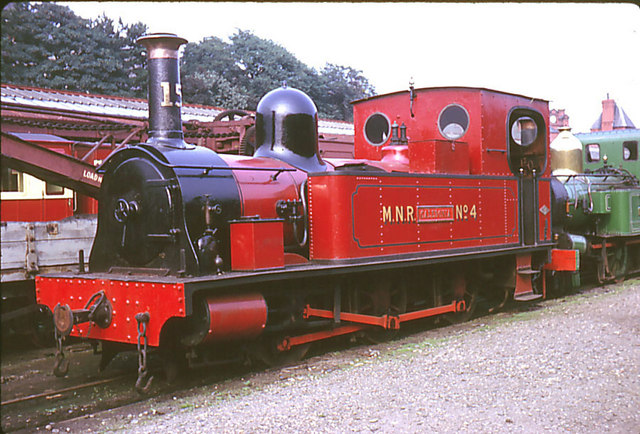
Isle of Man Railway locomotive no. 15 Caledonia built in 1885 for the Manx Northern Railway as no. 4. Seen here at Douglas station in 1969 in MNR colours

In the United Kingdom, 1901-built Dübs crane tank No. 4101 is preserved at the Foxfield Light Railway, Stoke-on-Trent. It was operational and saw frequent use by late 2012.

In Ireland, 5 Slieve Callan is preserved at the West Clare Railway.

Natal Government Railways 'A' Class 4-8-2 tank locomotive No. 196 (Works Number 3819 of 1899) returned to the UK for preservation by the NBL Preservation Group on 12 May 2011. It is on display at the Mizens Railway near Woking in Surrey. Full details can be found on www.nbloco.net

On the Isle of Man Railway, Manx Northern Railway 0-6-0 no. 4 Caledonia was built in 1885 (works no. 2178), renumbered 15 when brought into IoMR stock in 1904 (Boyd 1996; p. 188-192). Cale returned to service to commemorate its part in building the Snaefell Railway when a third rail to 3' gauge was laid to facilitate a return to Snaefell, and 15 has just undergone a major overhaul and returned to service after a brief absence.

Nos. 1 and 2 of NSB class XXI, built 1894, are preserved at the Setesdal Line museum railway, Norway. No. 1 has been out of service since the closure of ordinary activities at the Setesdal Line in 1962; no. 2 has been in regular use on the Setesdal Line since 1894 and until recently, both during ordinary activities and, since 1964, at the museum railway. It was undergoing a general service in August 2005.

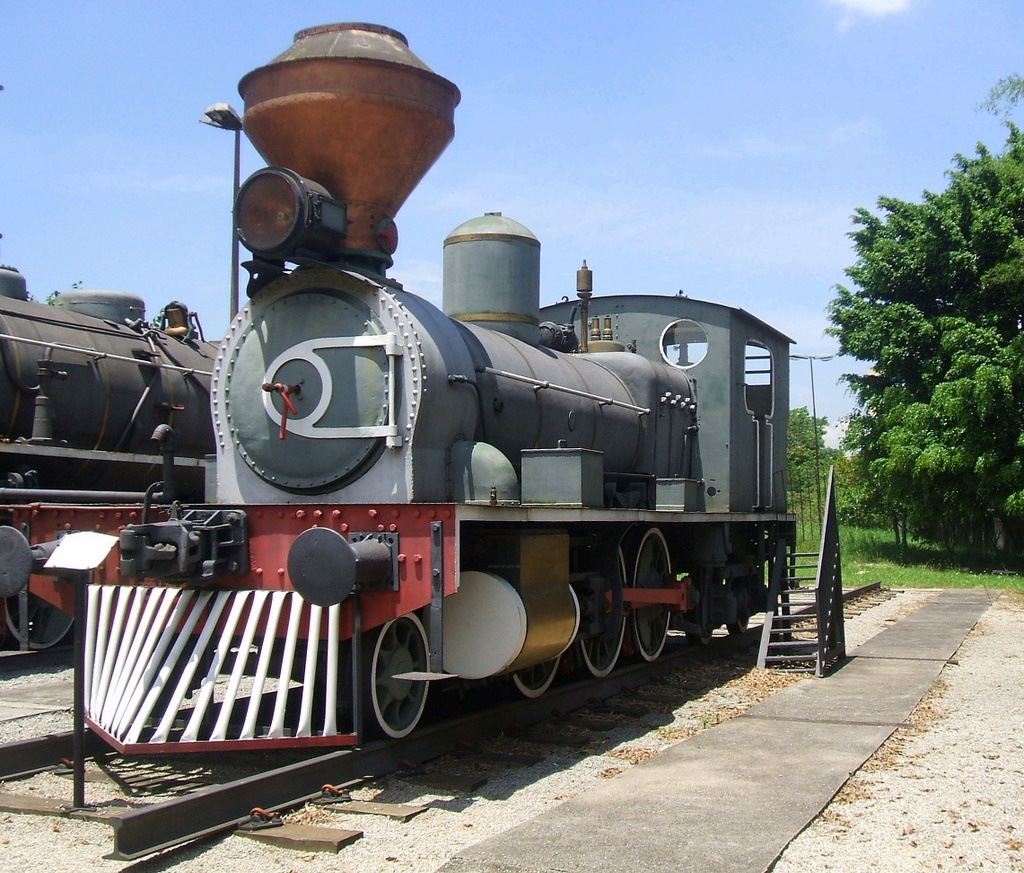
2-6-4T #2351, built in 1888 for CP, railway numbering unknown. Seen here displayed at the Technology Museum of São Paulo, SP (Brazil)

Locomotive No.3 built for the Canadian Pacific Railway in 1882 is owned by the Prairie Dog Central enthusiast railway of Winnipeg, Manitoba. It underwent a thorough restoration, completed in early 2009.

Built in 1882 for Natal Government Railways (NGR), a predecessor to South African Railways, is Class-A No.88, restored and preserved by Umgeni Steam Railway (Durban, South Africa). It is used on the 3.2 km (2 mile) route from Durban to Point Road and later on the 23-hour trip from Durban to Johannesburg.

Built in 1888 for former Brazilian CP (unknown numbering) and later having been an industrial locomotive at Frigorífico Bordon is Dubs #2351, a 2-6-4T of 5 ft 3 in (1,600 mm) gauge, completely restored for static exhibition at Museu de Tecnologia de São Paulo (São Paulo Technology Museum in São Paulo, SP.

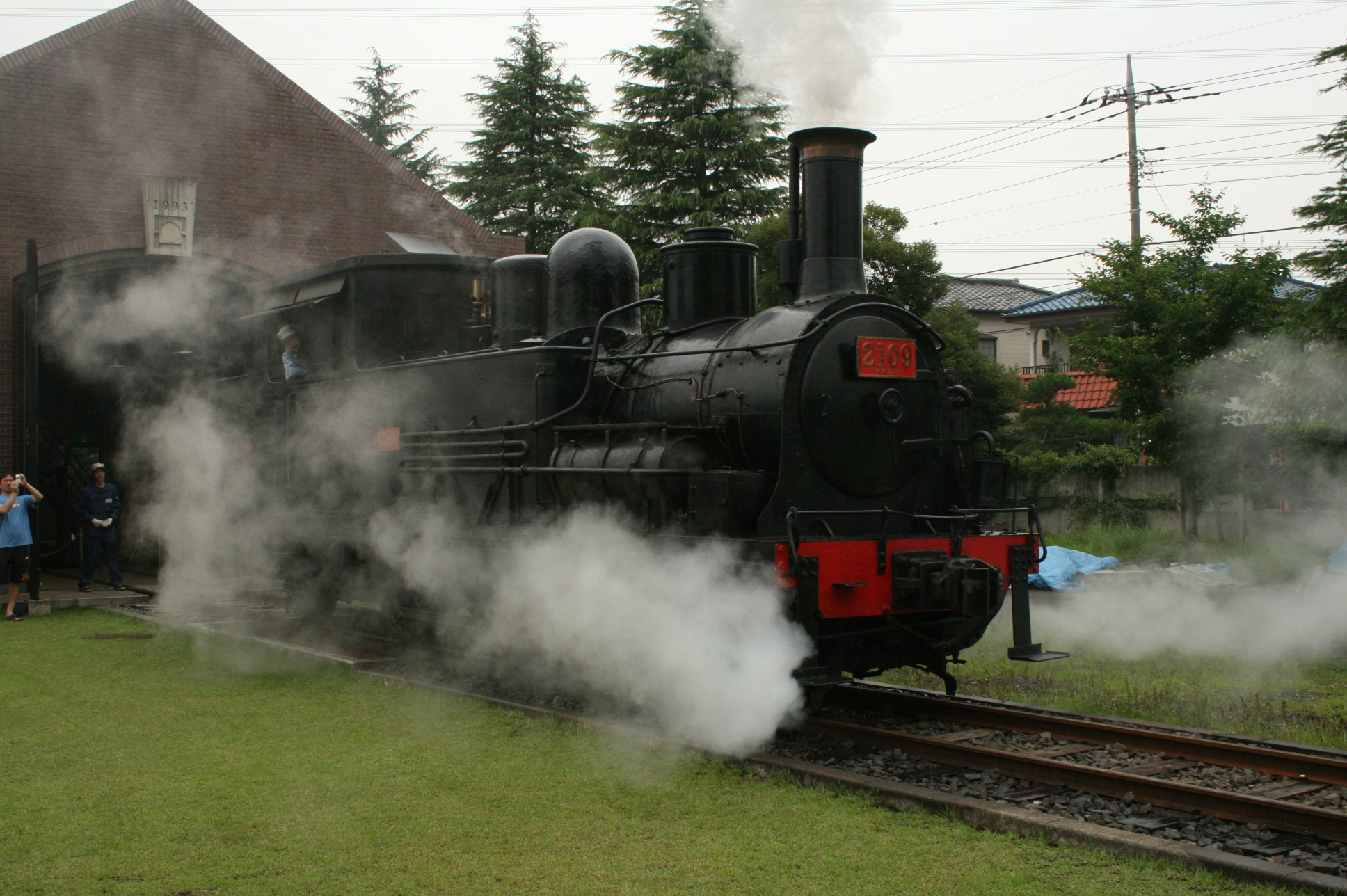
0-6-2 #2774, built in 1891 for the Japanese Governmental Railways, has been preserved in working order in Saitama, Japan.

A JGR Class 2100 0-6-2 locomotive, built in 1891 and numbered 2109, is preserved in working order at the Nippon Institute of Technology in Saitama, Japan. Its production number, 2774, is on the maker's plate attached to the locomotive. It was used on the three-kilometre Seino Railway in Gifu to transport limestone until 1966. After being preserved on the Oigawa Railway, the Institute received the locomotive in September 1993.

The 0-6-2T locomotive No. 17 Urdaneta, part of the Manila Railway Dagupan class was built in 1888 was built for the Manila Railway Company. It entered service in 1890 and was retired in 1927. Urdaneta was one of the only four steam locomotives to be preserved by the Philippine National Railways, its modern-day successor. This locomotive is now on display in Dagupan.

== See also ==
- Category:Dübs locomotives
