= Tasmanian Government Railways X class =

Class of Australian diesel locomotives

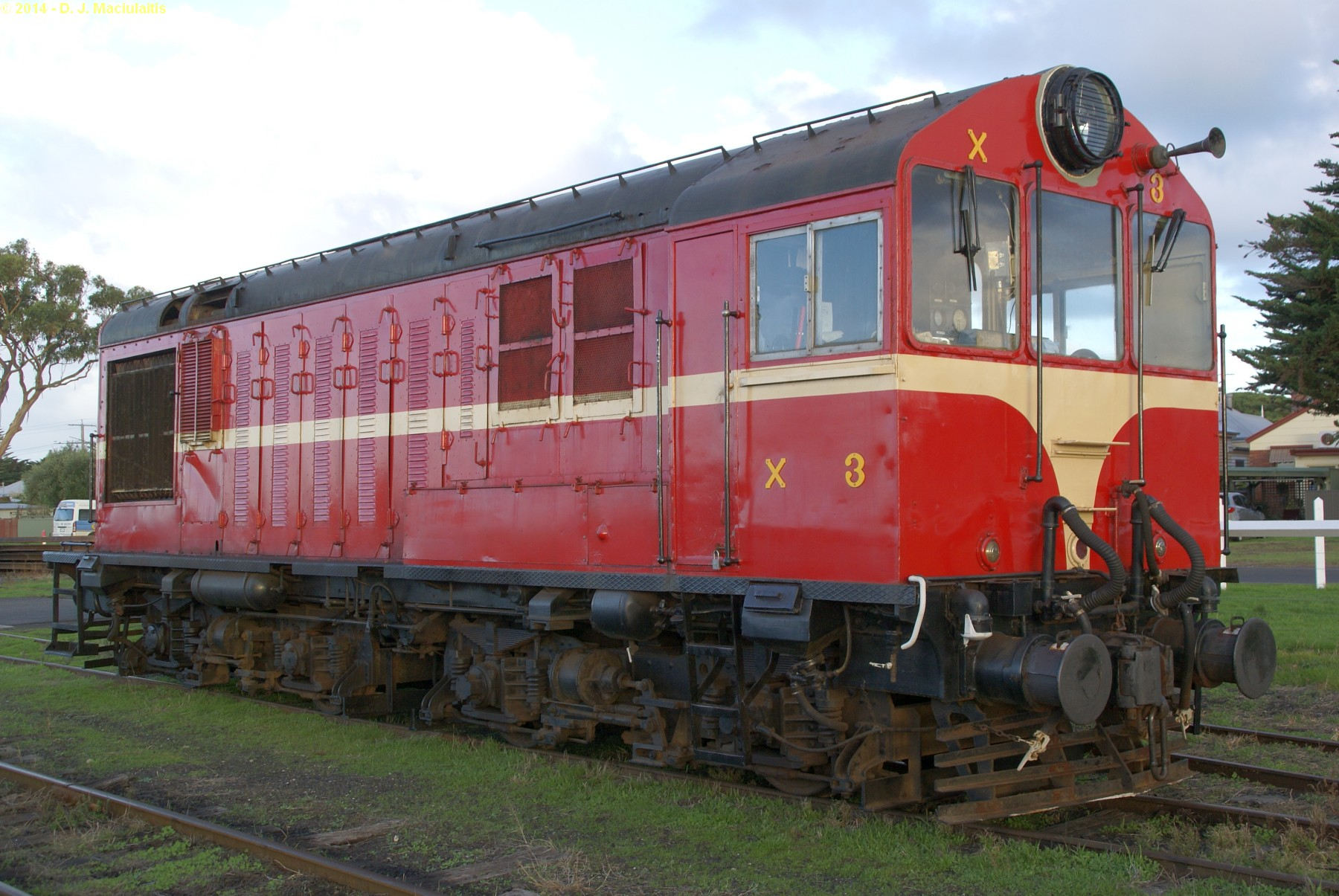
- X3 at the Bellarine Railway in May 2014
Type and origin
- Power type: Diesel-electric
- Builder: English Electric; Dick, Kerr & Company; Vulcan Foundry
- Serial number: 1796–1805 (VF D88–D97); 1811–1820 (VF D105–D114); 1821–1832
- Build date: 1950–1952
- Total produced: 32
Specifications
- Configuration
  - Commonwealth: Bo-Bo
- Gauge: 1,067 mm (3 ft 6 in)
- Wheel diameter: 3 ft 0 1/2 in (0.927 m)
- Minimum curve: 264 ft (80.467 m)
- Wheelbase: 24 ft 9 in (7.544 m) total, 8 ft 3 in (2.515 m) bogie
- Length: 34 ft (10.363 m) over headstocks
- Width: 9 ft 5 1/2 in (2.883 m)
- Height: 12 ft 5 in (3.785 m)
- Axle load: 14 1/4 long tons (14.5 t; 16.0 short tons)
- Loco weight: 57 long tons (57.9 t; 63.8 short tons)
- Fuel type: Diesel
- Fuel capacity: 340 imp gal (1,500 L)
- Prime mover: English Electric 6SRKT Mark I
- RPM range: 450–750 rpm
- Engine type: Inline four stroke, two valves per cylinder
- Aspiration: Turbocharged
- Generator: EE827A
- Traction motors: 4 x EE521B
- Cylinders: 6
- Cylinder size: 10 in × 12 in (254 mm × 305 mm)
- Transmission: Electrical
- MU working: 90V, 9 notch electro-magnetic control
- Loco brake: Air
- Train brakes: Vacuum
Performance figures
- Maximum speed: 55 miles per hour (89 km/h)
- Power output: 660 hp (490 kW) gross, 600 hp (450 kW) net
- Tractive effort
  - Starting: 33,500 lbf (149.0 kN)
  - Continuous: 12,000 lbf (53.4 kN) at 16 miles per hour (26 km/h)
Career
- Operators: Tasmanian Government Railways; AN Tasrail
- Number in class: 32
- Numbers: X1-X32
- First run: September 1950
- Last run: August 1988
- Preserved: X1, X3, X4, X10, X18, X20, X30
- Disposition: 7 preserved, 25 scrapped

The X class is a class of diesel locomotives built by English Electric for the Tasmanian Government Railways between 1950 and 1952. They were the first class of diesel locomotive to enter mainline service on a government owned railway in Australia.

== History ==
In 1946, the Tasmanian Government Railways (TGR) put out a request for tender for the construction of five to ten diesel-electric locomotives, which was successfully awarded to English Electric. Following a review of the tender in 1948, it was decided to order a second batch of ten, and finally a third batch of twelve in 1949.

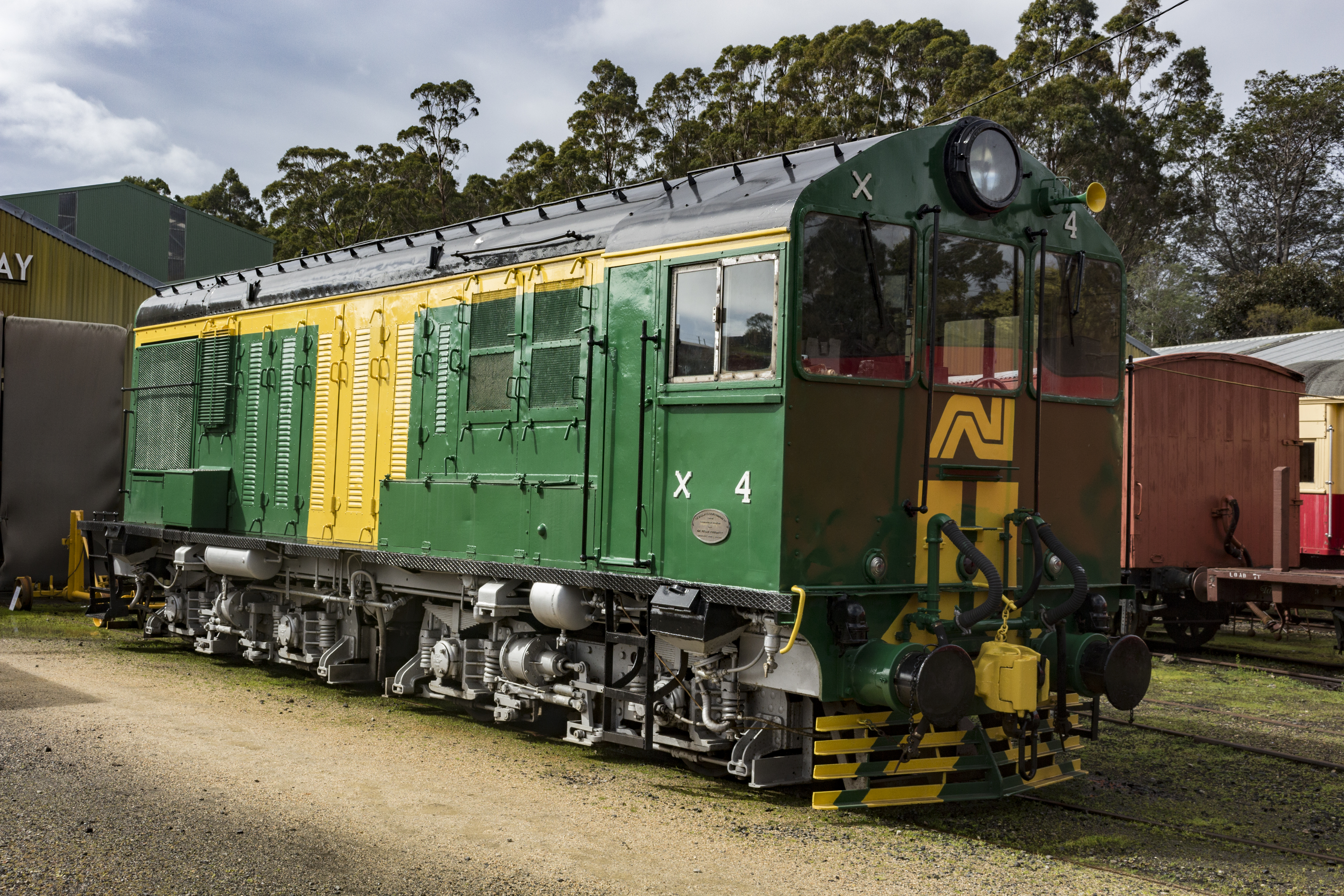
AN Tasrail liveried X4 at the Don River Railway in September 2016

Delivered by English Electric between September 1950 and December 1952, the first 20 were manufactured by the Vulcan Foundry under contract to English Electric, and the remaining 12 at Dick, Kerr & Company works. The first two units entered service on 13 September 1950.

The X Class was the first locomotive design in Australia to be able to be operated as multiple units, with the possibility of operating up to three locomotives, all controlled from the leading locomotive.

No members of the class were named after entering service; however, X16 carried a commemorative Festival of Britain plate after it was displayed at that exhibition in 1951.

Primarily built with components designed for branch line and shunting services, the X class proved very successful on main line heavy goods duties. Their light axle loading made it possible for them to work on a wide variety of lines, and for many years after their introduction the X class were the dominant freight-hauler on Tasmanian railways. They were also used on passenger trains.

Starting in April 1954 and working until July 1978, the Tasman Limited, Tasmania's premier passenger train, was hauled primarily by the X class. From 1960 they were often used in multiple on the train, and when Tasmania's passenger trains were ceased on 28 July 1978; X20, X16, X29 and X17 hauled the last Tasman Limited from Hobart to Wynyard. This was the last regular passenger service to operate in Tasmania.

In March 1978 the X class were included in the transfer of the Tasmanian Government Railways to Australian National. With the new transfer of twenty 830 class locomotives from South Australia and later purchase of ZB class and ZC class locomotives from Queensland Rail, the X class began to be withdrawn.

The first was withdrawn in October 1980. Units were withdrawn as they became due for major overhauls. With new locomotives in the fleet, and the change from vacuum-braked to air-braked rolling stock, X10 and X18 were the last in mainline service, often hauling paper trains to Australian Newsprint Mills' Boyer Mill. Although remaining in a very serviceable condition, the last X classes were made redundant in 1988 with the cessation of vacuum braked services.

Seven locomotives from the class have been preserved. Many have seen continued service on Tasmanian railways as special passenger trains, but at the present time there is no activity because of the state government suspension of heritage rail on active lines.

== XA Class ==
During the introduction of the more powerful, albeit slower Y class in 1961, it was found that X class engines were susceptible to overheating when working in multiple with Y classes on slow, heavy trains. This was due to the X class having only one stage of field weakening compared to two in the Y class. Coupled with the difference in gearing, this resulted in the X class loading up excessively at lower speeds. As a result, five had their generators and control equipment modified between 1961 and 1970 to give two stages of field weakening and were reclassified as the XA class.

As well as addressing overheating issues, the modifications allow the engines to work better on the grades on the southern region of the South line.

== Modifications ==
Side ladders and roof handrails were added to all units from 1956 while new automatic couplers and retractable buffers were fitted to most units during the early 1970s. Several units also had sliding windows installed later in life as a result of complaints from engine crews that the original winding windows were draughty and leaked in wet weather.

In addition, some units were constructed with eight sandboxes whilst normally each had four. X16 would also lack roof handrails over the cab area until fairly late, and XA class member had a metal bar welded underneath the cab windows across the full width of the cab. The reasons for these modification remain unclear, but are most likely to have been specially built for testing or experimental purposes.

== Livery ==
Upon their initial construction and delivery, all units of this class were painted Brunswick green; however, this colour tended to blend into the Tasmanian countryside, resulting in several accidents at level crossings. To enhance visibility, some units of the class had broad cream bands or an orange chevron painted on the ends.

From the mid-1950s, all units were painted into TGR's new red and cream livery. In 1970 a red, black and yellow tiger stripes livery was introduced.

After control of Tasmanian rail lines was passed to Australian National in March 1978, most units retained their old yellow livery, but with ANR signwriting. Four were repainted into Australian National's green and yellow livery.

== Status table ==
| X class no | XA class no | Last owner | Status |
|---|---|---|---|
| X1 | | Tasmanian Transport Museum, Glenorchy | Preserved, operational |
| X2 | | AN Tasrail | Withdrawn October 1980, scrapped |
| X3 | | Bellarine Railway, Victoria | Preserved, operational |
| X4 | | Don River Railway, Devonport | Preserved, operational |
| X5 | | AN Tasrail | Scrapped |
| X6 | | AN Tasrail | Scrapped |
| X7 | | AN Tasrail | Scrapped |
| X8 | | AN Tasrail | Scrapped |
| X9 | XA1 | AN Tasrail | Scrapped |
| X10 | | Derwent Valley Railway | Withdrawn August 1988, Preserved, operational |
| X11 | | AN Tasrail | Scrapped |
| X12 | XA2 | AN Tasrail | Scrapped |
| X13 | | AN Tasrail | Scrapped |
| X14 | XA3 | AN Tasrail | Scrapped |
| X15 | | AN Tasrail | Scrapped |
| X16 | | AN Tasrail | Scrapped |
| X17 | | AN Tasrail | Scrapped |
| X18 | | Derwent Valley Railway | Withdrawn August 1988, Preserved, operational |
| X19 | | AN Tasrail | Scrapped |
| X20 | | Bellarine Railway, Victoria | Preserved, operational |
| X21 | | AN Tasrail | Scrapped |
| X22 | XA4 | AN Tasrail | Scrapped |
| X23 | | AN Tasrail | Scrapped |
| X24 | | AN Tasrail | Scrapped |
| X25 | | AN Tasrail | Scrapped |
| X26 | | AN Tasrail | Scrapped |
| X27 | | AN Tasrail | Scrapped |
| X28 | XA5 | AN Tasrail | Scrapped |
| X29 | | AN Tasrail | Scrapped |
| X30 | | Derwent Valley Railway | Preserved, static |
| X31 | | AN Tasrail | Scrapped |
| X32 | | AN Tasrail | Scrapped |
