= AN Tasrail =

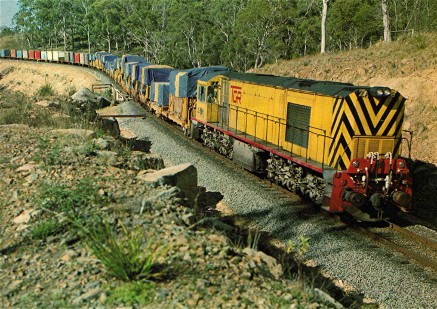
- Za class locomotive at Bell Bay in February 1978

Overview
- Headquarters: Launceston
- Locale: Tasmania
- Dates of operation: 1 March 1978–December 2009
- Predecessor: Tasmanian Government Railways
- Successor: TasRail

Technical
- Track gauge: 1,067 mm (3 ft 6 in)

AN Tasrail was an Australian railway company that operated the Tasmanian rail network from March 1978 until November 2004. Originally a subsidiary of the federal government-owned Australian National, it was sold to Australian Transport Network (ATN) in November 1997. ATN was acquired by Pacific National in 2004 and the AN Tasrail subsidiary was later acquired by the Tasmanian Government in 2009 to become TasRail.

== History ==
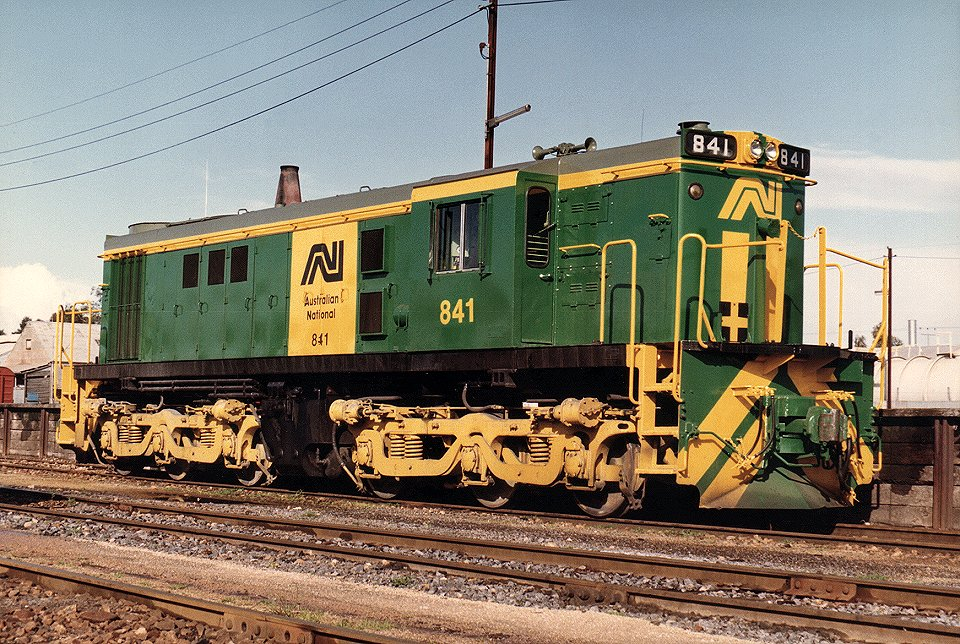
Australian National 830 class in Mount Gambier, South Australia in 1983

Until March 1978, the Tasmanian Government Railways had operated the state mainline railways since 1890, and had amassed a large and prosperous network over that time, albeit ahead of continued financial losses and the dwindling of freight and passenger workings up into the 1970s.

The Tasmanian and Federal Governments entered into an agreement for the transfer of the Tasmanian railways to Australian National on 1 July 1975, but the Tasmanian Transport Commission's Railways Branch retained responsibility for administering and operating the system as an agent for Australian National, until the latter assumed full control on 1 March 1978.

In November 1997, as part of the privatisation of Australian National, AN Tasrail was sold to Australian Transport Network, a partnership of New Zealand-based Tranz Rail and United States railroad Wisconsin Central.

In April 1998, Tasrail purchased Tasmania's only other rail operator, the Emu Bay Railway in the state's north-west from Pasminco. In February 2004, the company was purchased by Pacific National, owned by Patrick Corporation and Tranz Rail owner Toll Holdings.

In 2009, the operations were taken over by TasRail.

== Operations ==
The main cargo carried by AN Tasrail was cement, which is carried from Railton to the port at Devonport. Other major commodities carried were coal, logs, containers and newsprint. Passenger services ceased in June 1978.

The Australian National green and yellow livery was adopted in 1980. Upon privatisation, the Wisconsin Central's maroon and yellow livery was adopted. This was retained during the period of Pacific National ownership.

== Rolling stock ==
AN Tasrail inherited all of the Tasmanian Government Railways rolling stock. No new locomotives were ordered, but second-hand locomotives were purchased, some of which were for parts only.

=== Former Tasmanian Government Railways locomotives ===
- V class
- X class
- Y class
- 4 Z class
- 6 Za class

=== Australian National purchases ===
- 20 830 class transferred from Australian National from 1980
- 16 ZB class former Queensland Rail 2350/2370 class English Electric locomotives purchased in 1987
- 45 ZC class former Queensland Rail 1300 class English Electric locomotives purchased in 1988

=== Australian Transport Network purchases ===
- 12 rebuilt Queensland Rail 1460/1502 class DQ class locomotives
- 3 rebuilt Queensland Rail 1460 QR class locomotives
- 2 rebuilt Western Australian Government Railways D class locomotives with cabs similar to the New Zealand DXR class
- 1 New Zealand DC class locomotive

=== Former Emu Bay Railway locomotives ===
- 4 10 class
- 7 11 class

Preceded by Tasmanian Government Railways	Rail transport in Tasmania; 1978–2009	Succeeded by TasRail
