= Tasmanian Government Railways Za class =

Class of Australian diesel locomotives

Tasmanian Government Railways ZA class
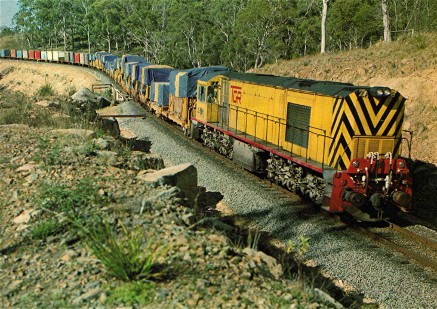
- ZA class locomotive at Bell Bay in February 1978
Type and origin
- Power type: Diesel-electric
- Builder: English Electric, Rocklea
- Serial number: A.259 to A.262, A.278 to A.279
- Build date: 1973–1976
- Total produced: 6
Specifications
- Configuration
  - UIC: Co-Co
- Gauge: 1,067 mm (3 ft 6 in)
- Wheel diameter: 3 ft 1 1/2 in (0.953 m)
- Wheelbase: 39 ft 11 in (12.167 m) total, 11 ft 3 in (3.429 m) bogie
- Length: 52 ft 9 in (16.078 m) over headstocks
- Height: 12 ft 7 in (3.835 m)
- Axle load: 16 long tons (16.3 t; 17.9 short tons)
- Loco weight: 96 long tons (97.5 t; 107.5 short tons)
- Fuel type: Diesel
- Fuel capacity: 1,400 imp gal (6,400 L)
- Prime mover: English Electric 12CSVT Mk III
- Engine type: Four stroke, four valves per cylinder
- Aspiration: Turbocharged, intercooled
- Alternator: Toyo WD10314A
- Traction motors: EE558
- Cylinders: 12 Vee
- Cylinder size: 10 in × 12 in (254 mm × 305 mm)
- MU working: 110V, stepless electro-pneumatic throttle
- Loco brake: Air, proportional control, dynamic
- Train brakes: Vacuum, converted to air 1982-1985) Westinghouse M6A then M9A
Performance figures
- Maximum speed: 60 miles per hour (97 km/h)
- Power output: 2,550 hp (1,900 kW) gross, 2,350 hp (1,750 kW) net
- Tractive effort: 54,000 lbf (240.2 kN) at 13.3 mph (20 km/h)
Career
- Operators: Tasmanian Government Railways; AN Tasrail; TasRail
- Number in class: 6
- Numbers: Za1-Za6
- Delivered: Za 1 to Za 4: July 1973, Za 5 & Za 6: 1976
- First run: 10 July 1973
- Withdrawn: May 2014
- Preserved: 2
- Current owner: TasRail; Don River Railway; Tasmanian Transport Museum
- Disposition: 1 stored, 2 preserved, 3 scrapped

The Tasmanian Government Railways Za class is a class of diesel locomotives built by English Electric, Rocklea for the Tasmanian Government Railways in 1973.

== History ==
With the construction of a new line from Launceston to Bell Bay, Tasmanian Government Railways placed an order for four 1752 kW locomotives with English Electric. The first four were delivered in 1973. A further two were delivered in 1976, ZA 6 being the final locomotive built by GEC Australia and the last English Electric locomotive built anywhere. The 1976 locomotives differed from the earlier batch in having a rounded cab roof, similar to the Z class, instead of an angled roof like the 2350 class from which they were derived.

In March 1978 the Za class were included in the transfer of the Tasmanian Government Railways to Australian National. From 1982 all had their vacuum brakes replaced with air brakes.

In 1988, ZA6 was painted into a modified version of the AN green and gold scheme, with a Tasmanian state flag on the ends of the locomotive where the AN logo usually sat, and the logo for the Bicentenary celebrations on the long hood, to celebrate the Australian Bicentenary. In 1996, it was repainted into the then-standard reverse yellow and green scheme, however it retained the bicentennial modifications.

In June 1998 the five in service were renumbered as the 2114 class, ZA4 having been withdrawn.

In May 2014, 2114 joined 2115 and 2118 in storage after the new TR class entered service. 2118 (ZA6) was held for preservation with 2115 (ZA2) retained as a parts donor.

In January 2021, the Tasmanian Transport Museum announced it had secured ZA6, moving it by road the following month.

Za1 was delivered to Don River Railway for preservation on 23 May 2022.

== Status table ==
Original no	Last no	Owners	Livery	Status
Za1	2114	Don River Railway	AN/Tasrail reverse yellow and green (to be repainted in ANR tiger stripe)	Preserved Operational
Za2	2115	TasRail	AN/Tasrail reverse yellow and green	Stored
Za3	2116	TasRail	AN/Tasrail reverse yellow and green	Scrapped
Za4	Za4	AN Tasrail	AN/Tasrail green and yellow	Scrapped
Za5	2117	TasRail	AN/Tasrail reverse yellow and green	Scrapped
Za6	2118	Tasmanian Transport Museum	AN/Tasrail reverse yellow and green (to be repainted into bicentennial AN/Tasrail green and yellow)	Preserved
