= Queensland Railways 2350 class =

Class of Australian Co′Co′ diesel-electric locomotives

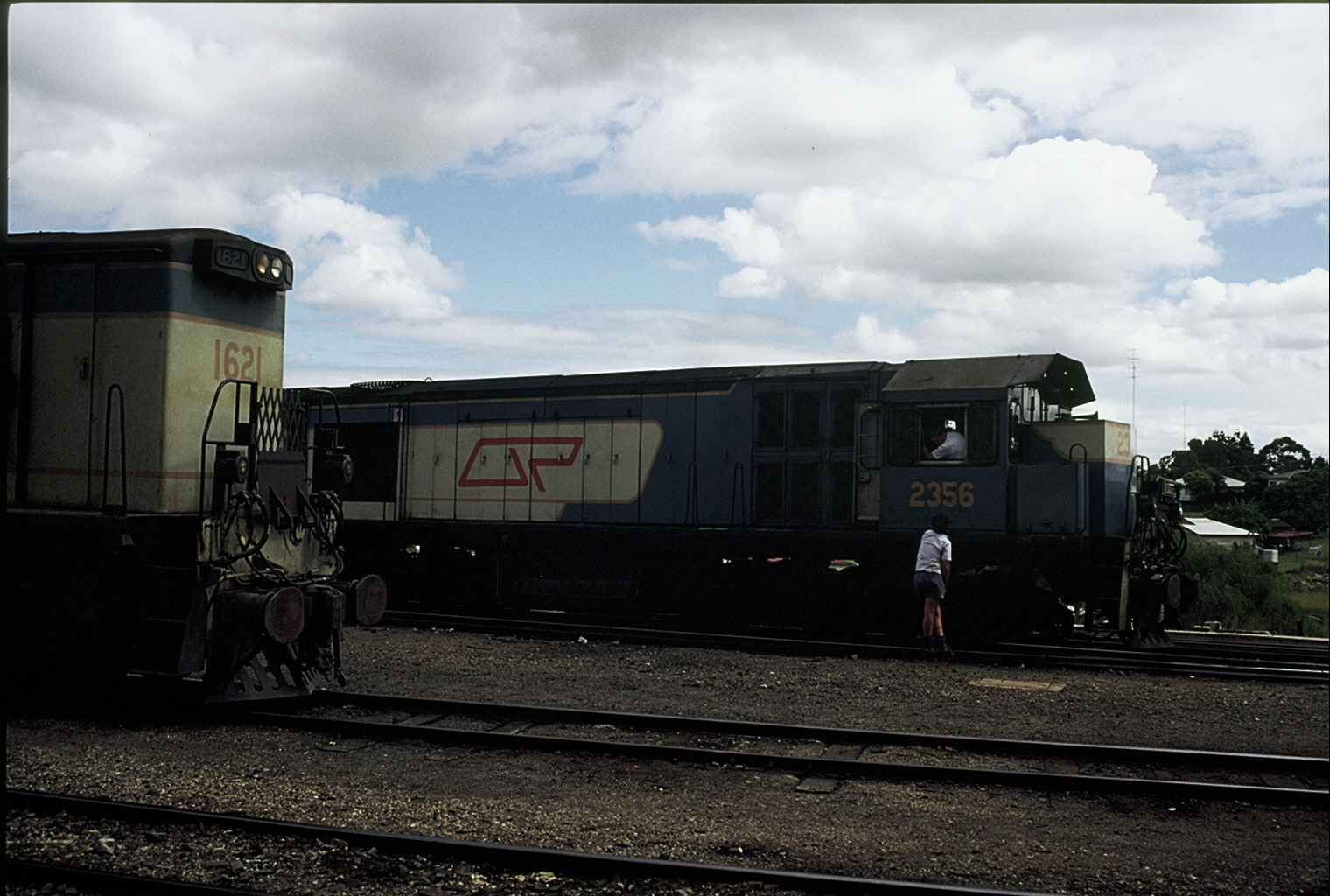
- 2356 in Gympie yard with 1621 in 1987
Type and origin
- Power type: Diesel-electric
- Builder: English Electric, Rocklea
- Serial number: A.253 to A.258; A.263 to A.268
- Build date: 1973–1974
- Total produced: 12
Specifications
- Configuration
  - UIC: Co-Co
- Gauge: 1,067 mm (3 ft 6 in)
- Wheel diameter: 3 ft 1 1/2 in (0.953 m)
- Wheelbase: 38 ft 6 in (11.735 m) total, 12 ft 6 in (3.810 m) bogie
- Length: 52 ft 9 in (16.078 m) over headstocks
- Width: 9 ft 3 in (2.819 m)
- Height: 12 ft 5 1/8 in (3.788 m)
- Axle load: 15 long tons (15.2 t; 16.8 short tons)
- Loco weight: 90 long tons (91.4 t; 100.8 short tons)
- Fuel type: Diesel
- Fuel capacity: 1,500 imp gal (6,800 L)
- Prime mover: English Electric 12CSVT Mk III
- RPM range: 900rpm
- Engine type: four stroke, four valves per cylinder
- Aspiration: turbocharged, intercooled
- Alternator: Toyo WD10314A
- Traction motors: English Electric 548
- Cylinders: 12 Vee
- Cylinder size: 10 in × 12 in (254 mm × 305 mm)
- MU working: 110V, stepless electro-pneumatic throttle
- Loco brake: Air, dynamic
- Train brakes: Air
Performance figures
- Maximum speed: 50 miles per hour (80 km/h)
- Power output: 2,550 hp (1,900 kW) gross, 2,350 hp (1,750 kW) net
Career
- Operators: Queensland Railways
- Number in class: 12
- Numbers: 2350-2361
- First run: 16 April 1973
- Current owner: TasRail, Launceston & North East Railway
- Disposition: 2 stored, 1 preserved, 2 rebuilt, 7 scrapped

The 2350 class were a class of diesel locomotive built by English Electric, Rocklea, for Queensland Railways in 1973–1974. All were later sold to AN Tasrail.

== History ==
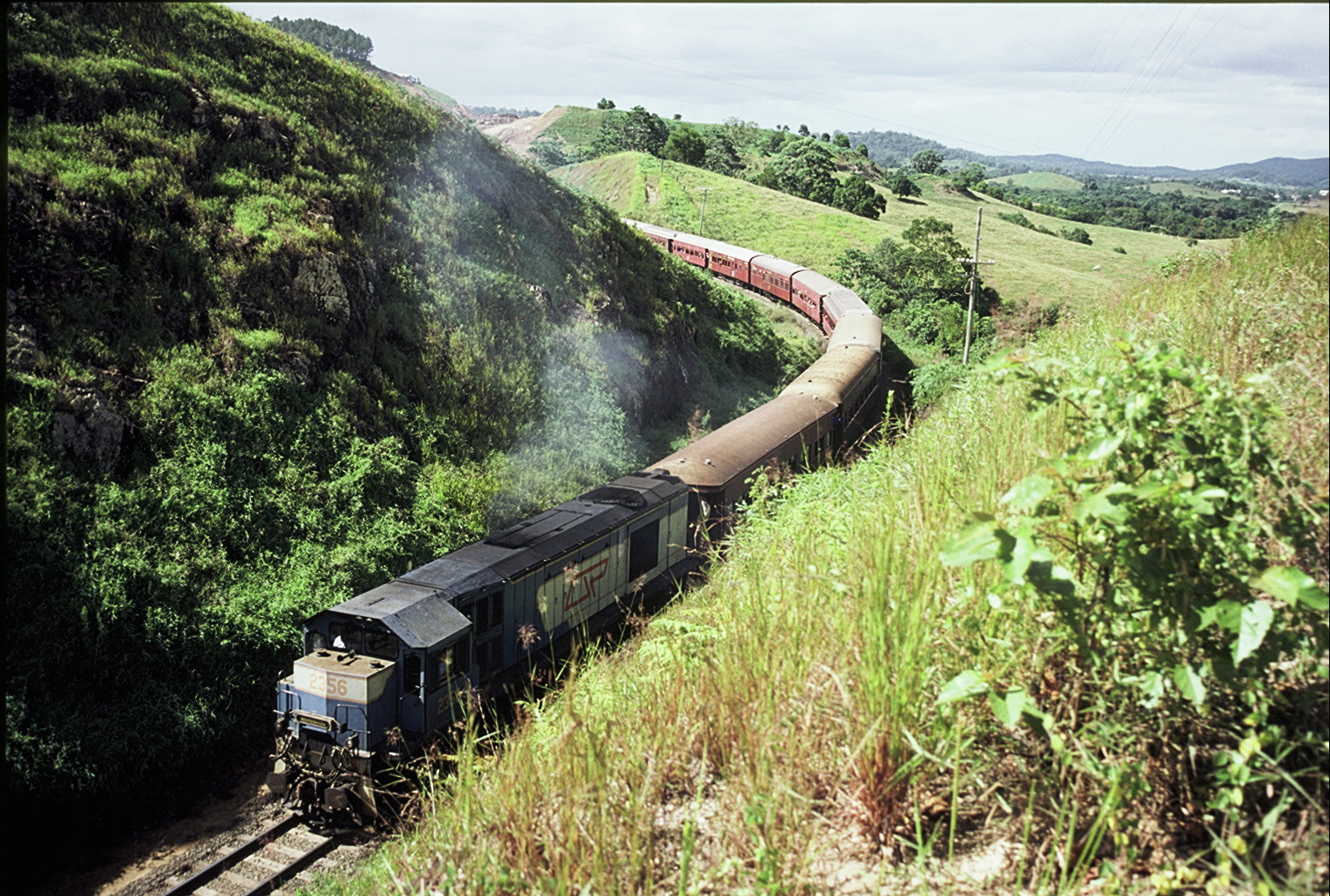
2356 hauls a special train up the grade north of Eumundi on the North Coast line in 1987

The 2350 class was built for use on the Blackwater and Moura coal lines and based at Gladstone. The class became surplus following electrification of the coal lines and in 1987 were all sold to AN Tasrail where they all entered service as the ZB class. They were very similar to the Tasrail Za class. In fact, the first four ZA class's builder's numbers follow on in sequence from those of the 2350s and are followed by those of the 2370s.

In 1995, one was rebuilt by Australian National's Port Augusta workshop with a raked cab similar to the EL class and renumbered ZR1, while in 1997 a second was rebuilt at AN Tasrail's Launceston workshops with a more conventional cab as ZR2.

In 2003, three were sold to South Spur Rail Services, with two shipped to Western Australia to operate infrastructure trains with the fourth stripped for parts in Launceston, eventually being owned by Greentrains. Finally being scrapped in 2016, with the sole remaining WAGR R class, after being left exposed to heavy vandalism.

The remaining four locomotives are in storage at TasRail's East Tamar workshops, having been out of use since early 2014. One of these, ZB 5/2123 (2352), has been preserved by Launceston & North East Railway. It was finally delivered to their Lilydale yard on 27 May 2022, making it the first of its class in preservation. ZP1 was donated to the Don River Railway in 2023, while ZR2 was donated to the L&NER in February 2024.
