= Tasmanian Government Railways =

Former government railway operator in Tasmania, Australia

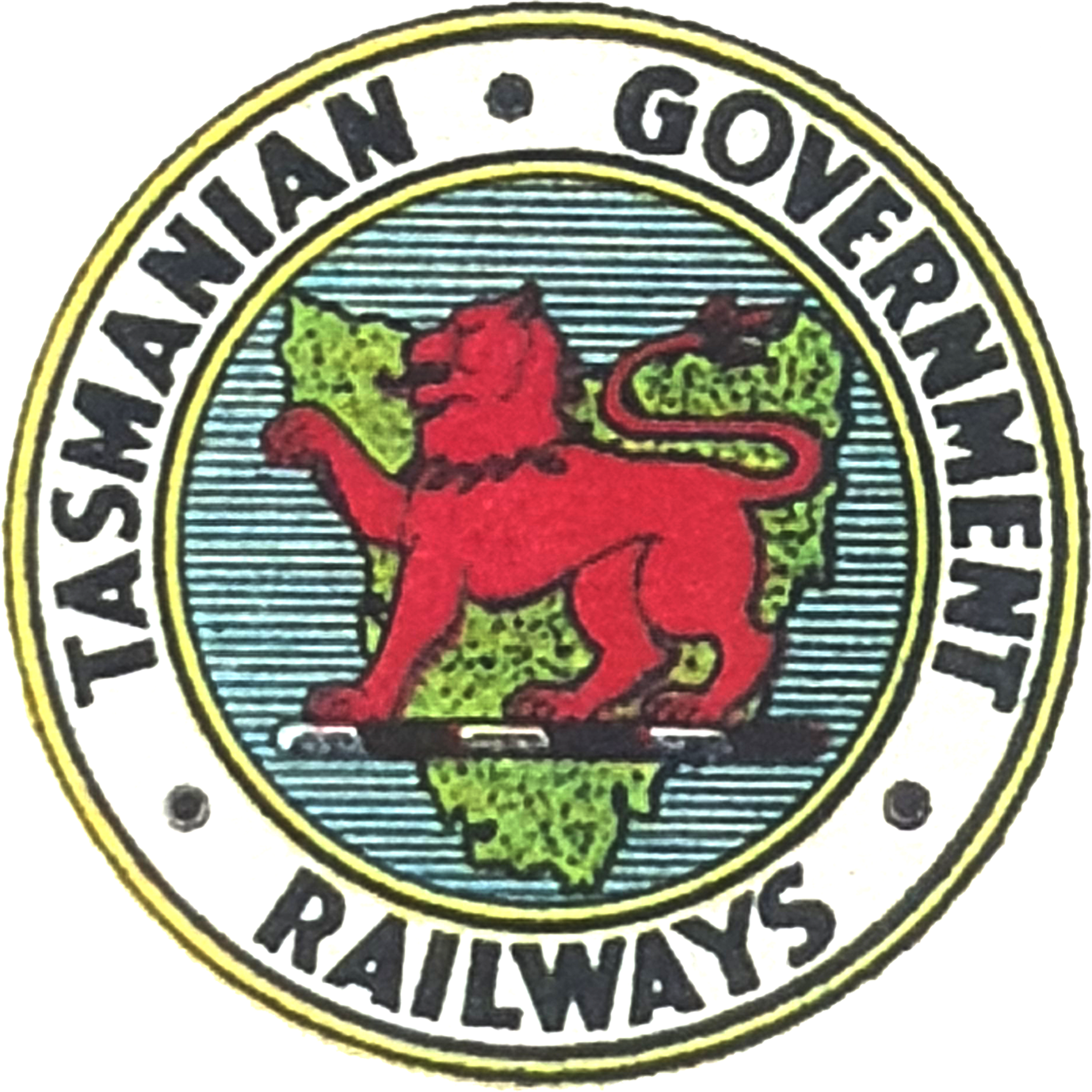

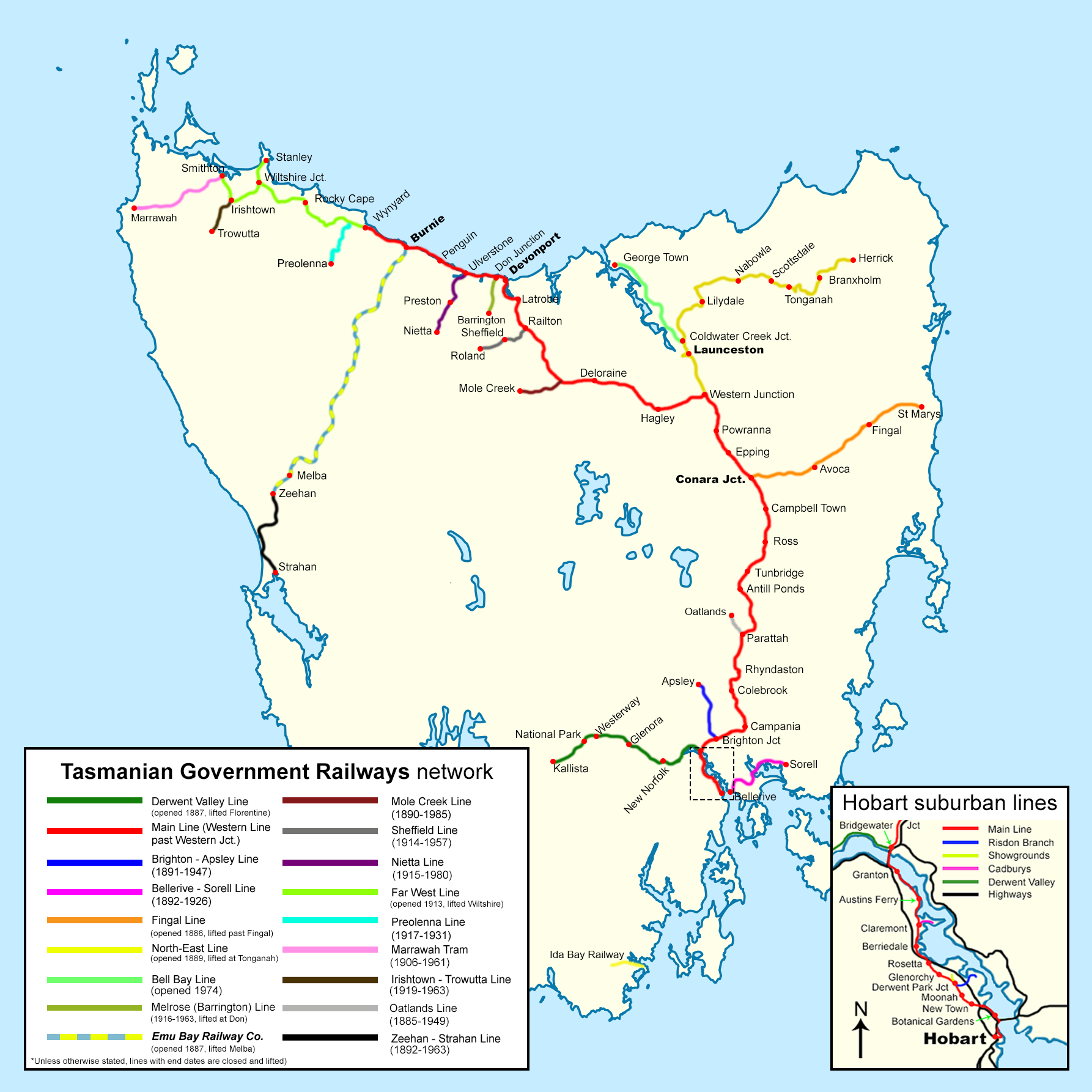
- Network map (at fullest extent)

Overview
- Main regions: Tasmania, Australia
- Stations called at: ~255 (in 1949)
- Parent company: Government of Tasmania
- Headquarters: Hobart and Launceston
- Reporting mark: TGR
- Dates of operation: 3 August 1872–1 March 1978
- Predecessors: Launceston and Western Railway, Tasmanian Main Line Railway
- Successor: AN Tasrail

Technical
- Track gauge: 3 ft 6 in (1,067 mm)
- Previous gauge: 5 ft 3 in (1,600 mm)
- Length: 851 kilometres (529 mi) in 1978

The Tasmanian Government Railways (TGR) was the former operator of the mainline railways in Tasmania, Australia. Formed in 1872, the railway company was managed by the Government of Tasmania, and existed until absorption into the Australian National Railways Commission in 1978.

== History ==
=== Precursor ===
==== Launceston & Western Railway ====
The early railways of Tasmania were constructed by a number of private companies, rather than owned by the Government.

Proposals were considered by the Tasmanian Government for the construction of a railway from Hobart to Launceston as early as 1856, when the colony gained responsible government.

In June 1857, railway committees were formed in Deloraine, Carrick, Longford, Perth and Westbury, to lobby for the construction of a railway between Launceston and Deloraine. Delegations from these committees were successful in lobbying the Mayor of Launceston to organise a meeting on the issue on 27 August, with discussions around the need for a railway to assist farmers in getting produce to market, given the poor state of roads and the cost of transporting goods. Subsequently, a petition was organised to deliver to the Governor.

In 1858, a Parliamentary Joint Committee reported in favour of railway construction within the Colony, but nothing was done until 1865 when the Prospectus of the Launceston and Western Railway Company was issued. The first Railway Act was passed later that year which provided for the construction of a railway between Launceston and Deloraine by private enterprise.

The Launceston and Western Railway was a Joint Stock Company of £450,000 capital, chiefly borrowed in England, with the interest guaranteed by the Tasmanian Government. The land-holders, whom the line would benefit, entered into an obligation to recoup the State should the returns from the railway fall short of the interest money.

The Launceston and Western Railway was formed on 9 May 1867. Surveying of the line begun almost immediately, with pegs being laid as far as Perth by July 1867. The first sod of the line was turned on 15 January 1868 by the Duke of Edinburgh who was on a visit to the Colonies.

On 15 July 1868 tenders were opened for the construction of the railway. Shareholders criticised the tenders for being unfair to local firms, preferring those from the other colonies rather than Tasmania. The contracts were awarded to Melbourne-based Overend and Robb, who had worked on railways in Victoria.

In August 1868, construction started at Jingler's Valley near Young Town. The undulating country presented few engineering challenges, with the only major works being a bridge over the North Esk in Launceston, cuttings and embankments climbing from St Leonards to Western Junction, a brick viaduct at Perth, and the Longford Railway Bridge.

Steam transport began earnestly in June 1869, when the contractors began hauling ballast from a quarry in Invermay. On 19 August 1869, the first "ride-on-rails" excursion took place between Jingler's Valley and Launceston, giving residents their first experiences with train travel.

By February 1870, most of the permanent way was complete, except for areas around Westbury and the Longford bridge. New tenders were issued for the construction of station buildings, while further carriages and rolling stock were being fabricated. The date for completion as set out in the contract was 10 March 1870, but an extension was given and construction continued to a point where the opening date could be set for the following September.

In July 1870, the first appointments of stationmasters and staff were made, and sidings had been completed at Perth, Longford and Westbury. Stations at Launceston, Longford, Westbury, Deloraine, and other stops were being built at this time, and the final shipment of rails from England meant completion of the line was expected by mid-August.

Extensive rains resulted in further delays, with flooding in parts requiring the construction of culverts and extra drainage, and it was not until 10 February 1871 that the line was opened for traffic by the Governor. When the line was opened, a service of three double-headed trains each way per day was operated, but this proved unsatisfactory and later on one locomotive per run was used.

During the construction period, the company had experienced some difficulty in raising the necessary finance to meet the cost of construction. It applied to the Government for assistance. The Government appointed two Railway Commissioners to generally supervise all railway construction and advance the company the finance to complete the building of the line. The construction contractor continued to operate the railway until November 1871, the L&WR then took over.

By December 1872, it was agreed that a fifth locomotive was required and an order was placed with Sharp, Stewart and Company. Traffic showed an increase after the company took over the working of the line, however difficulties were experienced in continuing operations and the payment of interest on loans.

=== Beginning ===
The Launceston and Western Railway was struggling to pay its creditors, and it became necessary for the Government to step in. Negotiations were commenced with a view of the Government taking over the line, with legislation enacted making the L&WR hand all assets to the Government on 3 August 1873. The Government took over operation of the line from 31 October 1873, and while it was not formally organised as such, the Tasmanian Government Railways were established.

The line was initially built in 5 ft 3 in (1,600 mm) Broad or Irish gauge. Very shortly after the Government takeover in 1873 a decision was made to convert the line to the narrow gauge as used by the newly created Tasmanian Main Line Railway.

In March 1876, the Tasmanian Main Line Railway Company had completed the construction of a 3 ft 6 in (1,067 mm) gauge line from Hobart to Evandale and entered into negotiation with the Government for the construction of a third rail over the broad gauge tracks of the Launceston and Western Railway between Evandale Junction and Launceston. Approval was given and the TMLR began operating over a dual gauge line into Launceston on 1 November 1876.

The Tasmanian Main Line Railway Company (TMLR) later opened their Hobart to Evandale line in 1876, to a 3 ft 6 in (1,067 mm). Because of the break-of-gauge, the TMLR laid a third rail upon the L&WR line, and operated dual gauge for the final 11 miles (17.7 km) to Launceston.

During the early 1880s, the Tasmanian Government decided upon construction of further narrow gauge lines and commenced with a 3 ft 6 in (1,067 mm) line from Deloraine to Devonport which opened on 1 September 1885. In 1887, the broad gauge rolling stock of the Launceston and Western Railway consisted of 14 passenger carriages, 4 horse boxes and 84 goods vehicles. A proposal to take up the outer rail was examined and it was decided that greater economy of operation would be achieved. The last broad gauge train ran on 20 August 1888.

The Government had during this time continued to take over failed railway companies across the state, and it soon became apparent that the Tasmanian Main Line Railway would suffer financial issues. With the absorption of the Hobart-Evandale line in 1890, the railway network became whole, and thus created an official public railway service in Tasmania. As a result of this takeover, all Tasmanian railways were relaid or newly constructed in 3 ft 6 in (1,067 mm) gauge.

=== Transport Commission ===
On 1 July 1939, the railway administration was absorbed into the newly created Transport Commission and became its Railway Branch. The commission was empowered to co-ordinate and improve land transport within the State, and one of its policies was to encourage the use of the railway wherever possible. Consequently, to aid the railway, Tasmania's road network was divided into nine road transport zones, with levies instituted against trucks which crossed between zones if they were in competition with the railways.

=== Centenary ===
From 7–14 February 1971, the TGR celebrated its centenary of operations, with special trains scheduled during this time for trips between Launceston and Deloraine with intermediate stops. Special fares were arranged for these trips, with return tickets between the two termini priced at $1.00 (approximately $9.74 in 2012). Trains were arranged with either single, double or triple-headed steam locomotives, depending on the type of stock and number of passengers carried.

On 10 February, the official ceremony was held at Launceston Railway Station, with addresses from the Transport Commissioner George Webb and Minister for Transport Leonard Bessell, as well as the unveiling of a commemorative plaque by the then-Premier of Tasmania William Angus Bethune. Richard Green, the Mayor of Launceston, also presented the Guard of the centenary train with "Scrolls of Greetings", which were presented to the Wardens of the Municipalities of Evandale, Longford, Westbury and Deloraine. The Centenary Train also conveyed special mail from the Launceston Post Office, as well as politicians and invited guests.

After the Centenary train, further special trains were run through to St Marys on the Fingal Line, south down to Ross on the Main Line, and as far up as Railton on the Western line. Several trains were also timetabled to pick up passengers flown from Melbourne to Western Junction.

The centenary celebrations were overall viewed as an astounding success, with most seats booked on each special train. Aside from the use of one Y Class diesel locomotive on a train for "special guests", every train scheduled as part of the centenary used well-maintained steam locomotives that were still in use on Tasmanian main lines.

=== Absorption ===
In 1975, the Federal Whitlam government sought to nationalise and take control of ailing state rail systems in a bid to revitalise them. Tasmania accepted the proposed Australian National Railways Commission on 23 May 1975, and the Railways (Tasmania) Act 1975 was passed. The Commission took control from the Transport Commission on 1 July 1975. As a result of the transfer, the Tasmanian Government ceased claimancy for funds from the Commonwealth Grants Commission, and was relieved of its debt obligations and interest payments incurred for money borrowed from the Commonwealth in construction of the Bell Bay Line in 1971.

== Operations ==
With around 16 lines across the state, the TGR operated a combination of approximately 275 stations, halts and junctions (as of 1949). Large stations were located at Hobart, Derwent Park, New Norfolk, Parattah, Launceston, Zeehan, Burnie and Devonport.

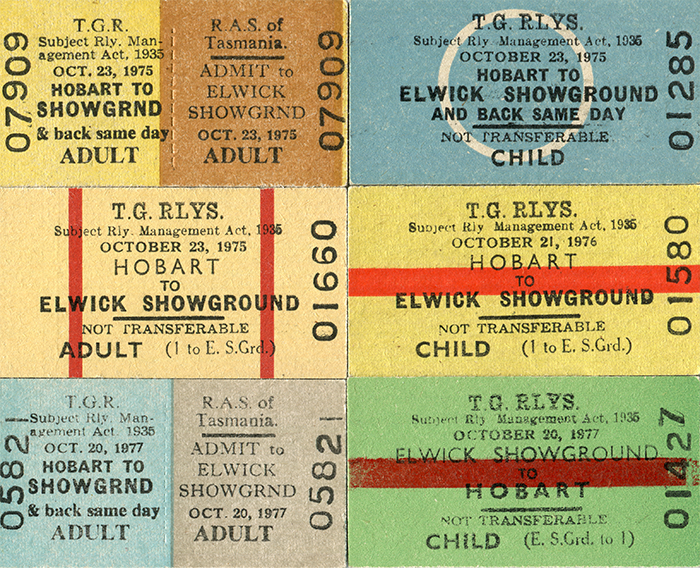
Typical designs of TGR railway tickets. These examples were used exclusively on special trains for the Royal Hobart Show and some include admission stubs.

On Hobart's suburban branch spurs, the TGR operated workers trains and freight for the Electrolytic Zinc Company and its zinc works in Lutana, as well as the Cadbury's Chocolate Factory in nearby Claremont. Special trains were also conveyed on Hobart's suburban network, with trains operating to Elwick Racecourse for the Hobart Cup, and to the Royal Hobart Showgrounds for the Royal Hobart Show. The special show trains to the Showgrounds ended in 1978, and were the last TGR passenger trains to be run in Tasmania.

In the 1970s, with the increase in car ownership, funding for highways and the loss of goods consignments, the TGR's operations suffered, and passenger services were eventually ceased across the network. Hobart suburban services ended in 1974, with passenger services ending entirely in 1978.

TGR introduced in 1954 some containers for bulk goods such as cement, sand, gravel and superphosphate.

=== Network ===
- Main Line – Running north/south between Hobart and Launceston.
- Western Line – Running from Launceston to Wiltshire Junction.
- Derwent Valley Line – Running from Bridgewater Junction to logging areas in Florentine.
- Fingal Line – Branching from Conara Junction, south of Launceston, to St Marys on the East Coast.
- Irishtown-Trowutta Line – A short line from Irishtown Junction (outside Smithton) to rural areas southwards.
- Bell Bay Line – Opened in the early 1970s, this line connected Launceston to its northern port at Bell Bay.
- Apsley Line – Branching from Brighton Junction north into rural farmlands. Closed in 1947.
- Mole Creek Line – Branching from Lemana Junction south from the Western Line into logging areas. Closed 1985.
- Strahan–Zeehan Railway Line – An isolated line joined to private railways, that linked the Queenstown to Strahan Mount Lyell railway line to the Emu Bay Railway line and as a result to Burnie and the rest of the Tasmanian railway system. .
- Bellerive–Sorell Line – An isolated and short-lived line that joined the Hobart suburb to the rural communities in the East. Closed in 1926.

=== Hobart railway station ===
Hobart railway station was the largest terminus in the state. Originally constructed in 1871 by the Tasmanian Main Line Company, the station was further expanded in the 20th century, with the station reconstructed and modernised in 1950. After the completion of construction works, the station had four platforms and a large concourse, as well as shopping stalls and food vendors.

In the 1960s and early 1970s the railway station saw more than 70 trains a day come and go. With the gradual cessation of passenger services in the latter half of the 1970s and the takeover by Australian National Railways in 1978, the railway station was sold and redeveloped in the 1980s. Sections of track that went into the station were demolished for the extension of the Tasman Highway onto Davey Street and Macquarie Street, and today, the redeveloped site houses the studios of the Australian Broadcasting Corporation and the Baháʼí Faith Centre of Learning, with the only remaining part of the rail terminal the original sandstone TMLR station building from 1871.

=== Tasman Limited ===
The Tasman Limited was the only named train operated by TGR (The West Coaster was operated by the private Emu Bay Railway). Inaugurated in April 1954, the train originally began as an express railcar service; however, later became a first-class luxury passenger service, operated with special articulated coaching stock, buffet service and modern X class diesel locomotives. Seating was reserved, and the service ran from Hobart to Wynyard with connections to Launceston, every day of the week except Sundays.

The Tasman, as it was colloquially known, outlasted all other TGR passenger services, and was officially the last regular scheduled government passenger train to operate on the Tasmanian rail network, departing Hobart at 9.20am on Friday 28 July 1978.

=== Tasmanian Railway Institute ===
In the 1930s, the TGR formed the Railway Institute as a social and recreational branch for employees of the TGR and their families. Staffed by railway personnel, the TGR provided facilities to the institute; with recreation halls and branches founded in Hobart, Launceston, Conara, Devonport and Wynyard. These halls contained offices, libraries, billiards rooms, a kitchen and other sporting and social facilities. The Launceston branch was unique, in that it also held a Commonwealth-recognised indoor small-bore rifle range, and boxing stadium.

The institute was tasked with training and certifying employees who were to be in charge of railway station accounts. The institute also formed an intrastate sporting events calendar, with teams from each branch participating. More central branches (e.g. Hobart), because of the higher number of members, often fielded two or more teams.

As well as providing hall facilities, the Institute purchased several holiday homes located across Tasmania, as a way of providing members and their families with affordable holidays. A two-bedroom home at Scamander and a three-bedroom former station master's house at Claremont were initially acquired. The TGR also provided a six-bedroom house in both Stanley and Devonport, and later a house in Wynyard and South Burnie were also requisitioned. In 1978 when passenger services and the TGR ceased, employee numbers fell and subsequently the houses in Stanley, Wynyard and South Burnie were abandoned. Railway Institute facilities were also sold off, and the halls in Devonport and Wynyard were the last to be sold; with Devonport selling just prior to the sale of AN Tasrail to the private consortium ATN TasRail.

Today, the Railway Institute still remains, but is now known as the AN (Railway) Institute of Tasmania Inc.. Several holiday homes also still exist and are in use, with the house in Devonport having been retained from TGR days. Two units in St Helens and two units in Claremont are also available, as well as a three-bedroom house in Launceston which was attained from AN Tasrail after they vacated offices there. These are owned outright by the institute, after in the 1980s during the time of the Australian National Railways Commission's ownership, a Master of Operating lease was created to prevent future railway administrations from taking away Institute facilities.

Due to legal threats from the state government, however; the institute was made to purchase the outstanding equity in the holiday homes of the TGR, to become completely separate to the railway administration. The Tasmanian membership paid $100,000 and the national administration of the ANR Railway Institute borrowed some more to buy the railway's equity in St Helens, Launceston, Devonport and Hobart. In 1997, the Institute in Tasmania became almost autonomous and became administered by volunteers. The Institute in Tasmania is assisted in administration by the board of AN Institute Inc. and its staff in Port Augusta, South Australia.

== Rolling stock ==
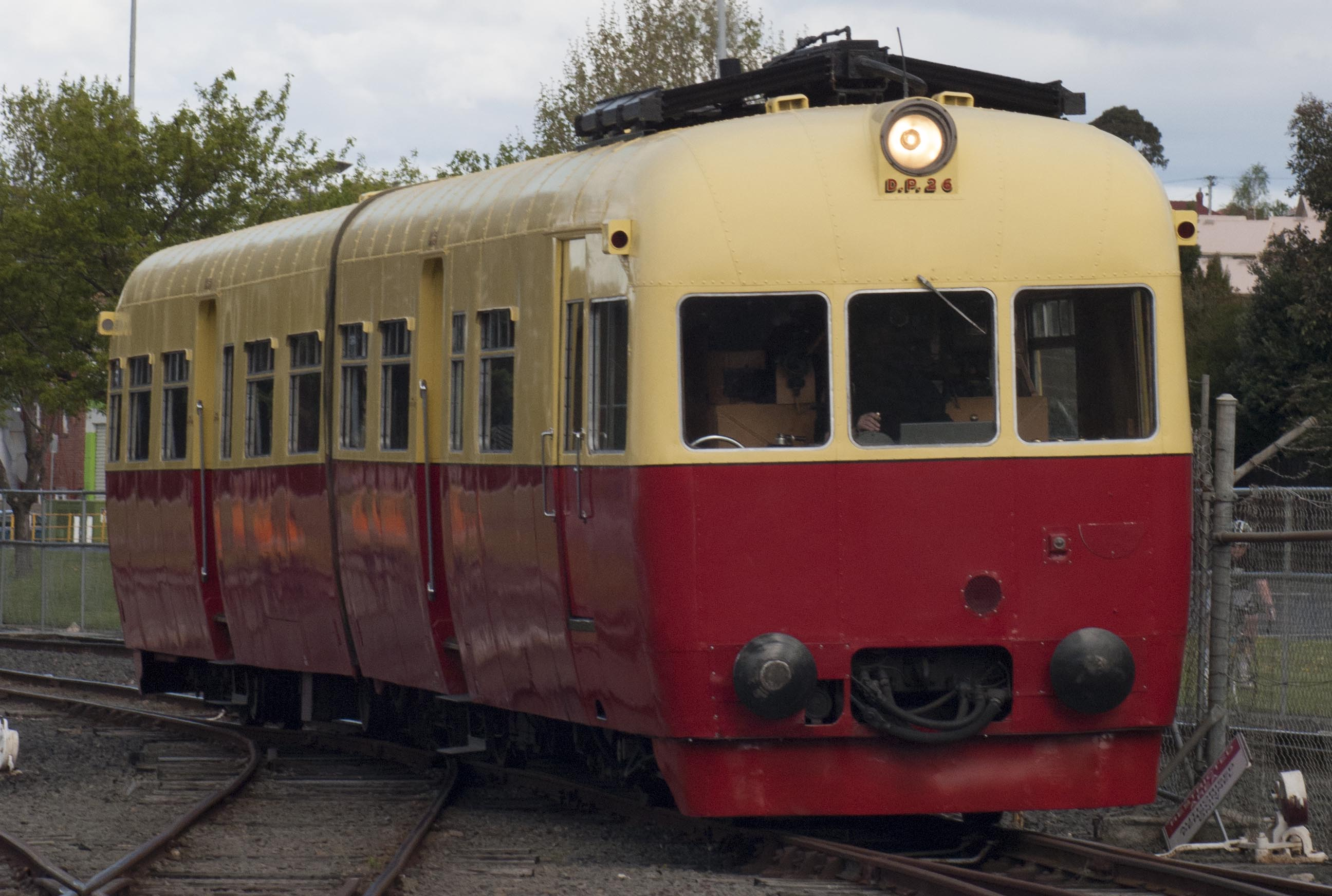
TGR DP class railmotor as used for suburban and rural passenger services, preserved in TGR livery at the Tasmanian Transport Museum.

The Tasmanian Government Railways had a vast range of motive power and rolling stock, including many steam and latterly diesel locomotives and railmotors. Throughout the history of the TGR, the company set a number of milestones in railways, including being the first operator of mainline diesel locomotives in Australia, and being the first in the world to operate a Garratt locomotive.

In 1936, the TGR owned 92 locomotives, 13 railcars, 143 carriages, 52 brake vans and 2.048 goods wagons.

The passenger rolling stock of the TGR included the 1955–58 series ACS class 'articulated country saloons', 76-seat first class with air suspended reclining seats, tray tables, state-of-the-art lighting and heating, and buffet service with hostesses. To the end in 1978, the TGR still used AAL class first class saloons with leather seats and maple panelling, as well as SP class brake and 2nd class passenger carriages, converted from Sentinel steam railcars.

When TGR was abolished in 1978, most rollingstock was transferred onto the register of Australian National Railways (with the exception of all passenger stock other than that kept for departmental use).

=== Locomotives ===
The TGR emblem used in later years.

The TGR had a large and varying fleet of both steam (and diesel in 1950) locomotives, and many served a multi-purpose position in the system; hauling freight, passenger, and mixed trains. The company also had a fleet of railcars used for inter-suburban commuter services.

Diesel

- V class
- X class (introduced 1950, first mainline diesel locomotive in Australia)
- Y class (introduced 1961)
- Z class (introduced 1973)
- Za class (introduced 1973)

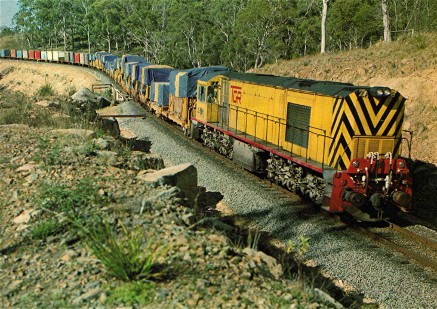
Za class locomotive, hauling a train through Bell Bay, Tasmania.

Railcars

- TGR DP class (introduced 1939)

These railcars were built by Waddingtons and served the Hobart-Parattah regional and suburban services up until 1974.

Steam

- M/MA class (introduced 1952/1957)
- H class (introduced 1951)
- F class (introduced 1949)
- G class (introduced 1944–50)
- DS class (introduced 1939–44)
- TGR CCS class (introduced 1924)
- Q class (introduced 1922)
- M class (introduced 1912)
- L class (introduced 1912)
- CC class (introduced 1912)
- K class (introduced 1909, first Garratt locomotive in the world)
- G class(introduced 1896)
- C class (introduced 1885–1937)

=== Preservation ===
Much of the TGR's former rollingstock and traction has been preserved by enthusiast groups and museums, or have been placed in public parks in Tasmania. The Tasmanian Transport Museum, Don River Railway and Derwent Valley Railway all hold extensive collections of TGR-related ephemera, infrastructure and rollingstock; either operational or non-operational/unrestored. The Queen Victoria Museum and Art Gallery, which is housed in the former TGR locomotive workshops in Inveresk, Tasmania, hold examples of the TGR's industrial operations, as well as a Y class locomotive, wagons, and locomotive nameplates and builder's plates. The Bellarine Railway in Queenscliff, Victoria, also has a number of ex-TGR carriages and locomotives.

During the 1980s, the Hotham Valley Tourist Railway (HVR) south of Perth, Western Australia, purchased two V-class diesel-mechanical shunting locomotives and several ex-Tasman Limited SS/SSD passenger carriages.

A couple of steam locomotives have been plinthed over the years and used in public parks since their withdrawal, with MA3 placed at the markets in Margate, and H6 placed at a park in Perth.

Internationally, a handful of TGR locomotives still remain, with the first Garratt, K1, surviving at the Welsh Highland Railway in Wales; and M2, an M class Pacific steam locomotive, which was moved from a park in Stanley in 1984, now remains at the Tanfield Railway in County Durham, England; however, this locomotive remains derelict and unrestored, and its future is uncertain.

== See also ==
- Rail transport in Australia
- Rail transport in Tasmania
- Tasman Limited
- TasRail
- Railway accidents in Tasmania

Preceded by Various private companies	Rail transport in Tasmania; 1888–1978	Succeeded by AN Tasrail
