= Drysdale railway station =

Railway station in Victoria, Australia

Coordinates: 38°10′48″S 144°33′26″E

Drysdale
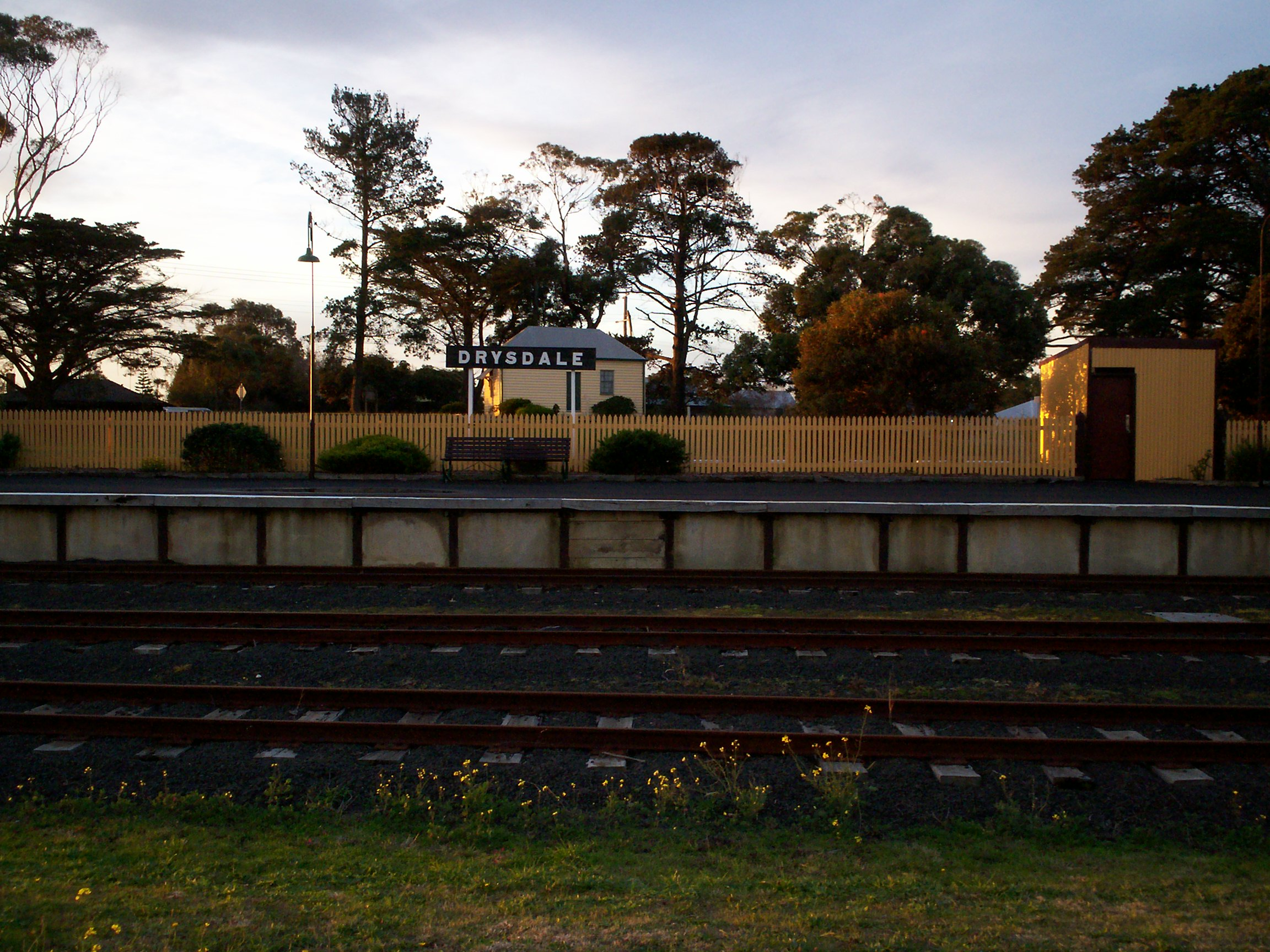

General information
- System: Bellarine Peninsula Railway station
- Lines: Bellarine Peninsula Railway former Queenscliff Line
- Platforms: 1
- Tracks: 3

Other information
- Status: Tourist/heritage station

History
- Opened: 21 May 1879; May 1980 (re-opened)
- Closed: 6 November 1976
Location

Drysdale is a railway station on the Queenscliff branch line off the main Warrnambool line in Victoria, Australia. It is 110 km (68 mi) from Melbourne, and 65 m (212 ft) above sea level. The station lies next to Lake Lorne and was first opened on 21 May 1879. It operated until 6 November 1976 when it was closed. Subsequently, usage of the line was granted to the Bellarine Peninsula Railway which commenced tourist operations from Queenscliff in May 1979 to Laker's Siding, extending to Drysdale soon afterwards.

== History ==
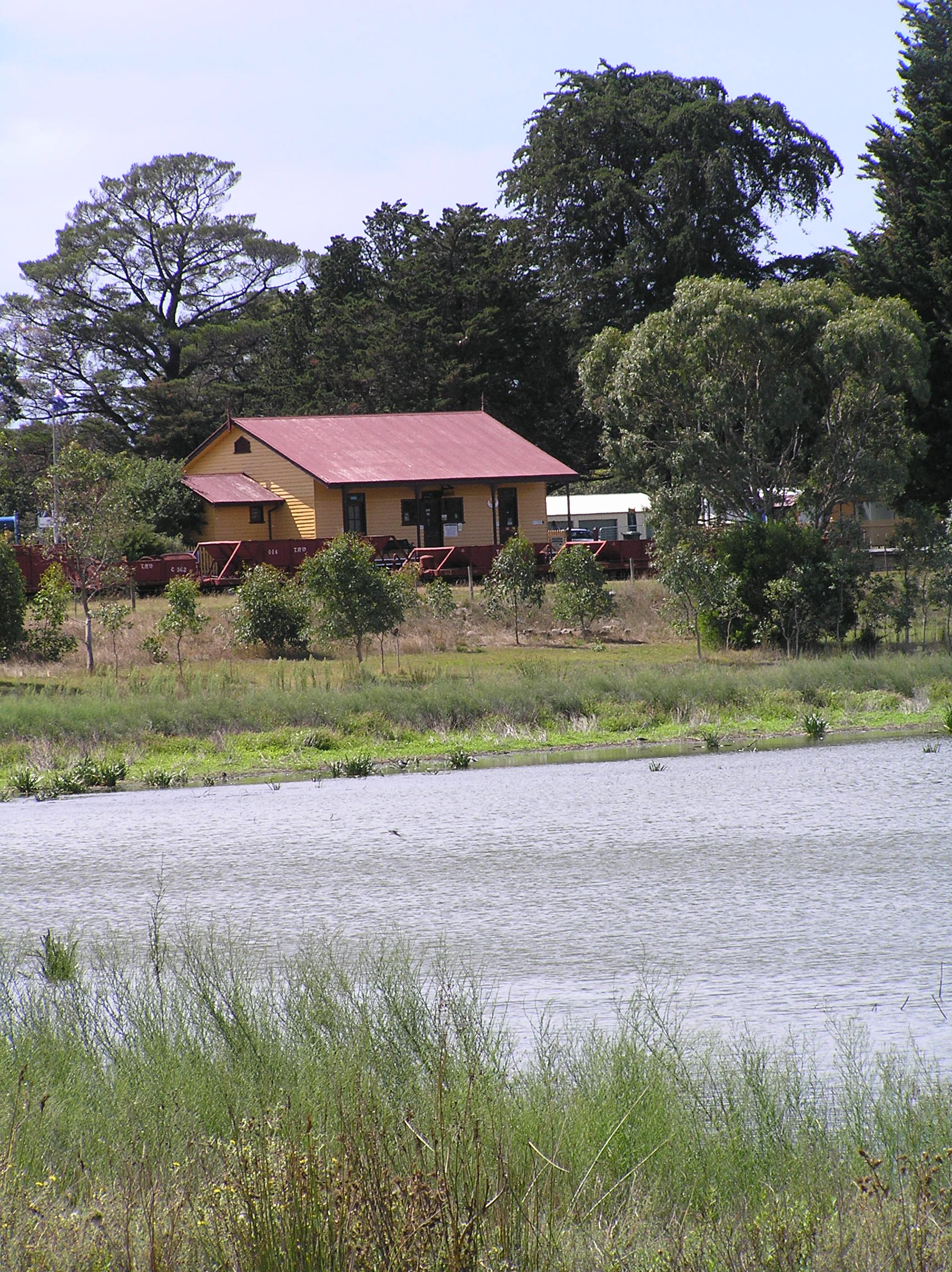
View from across Lake Lorne

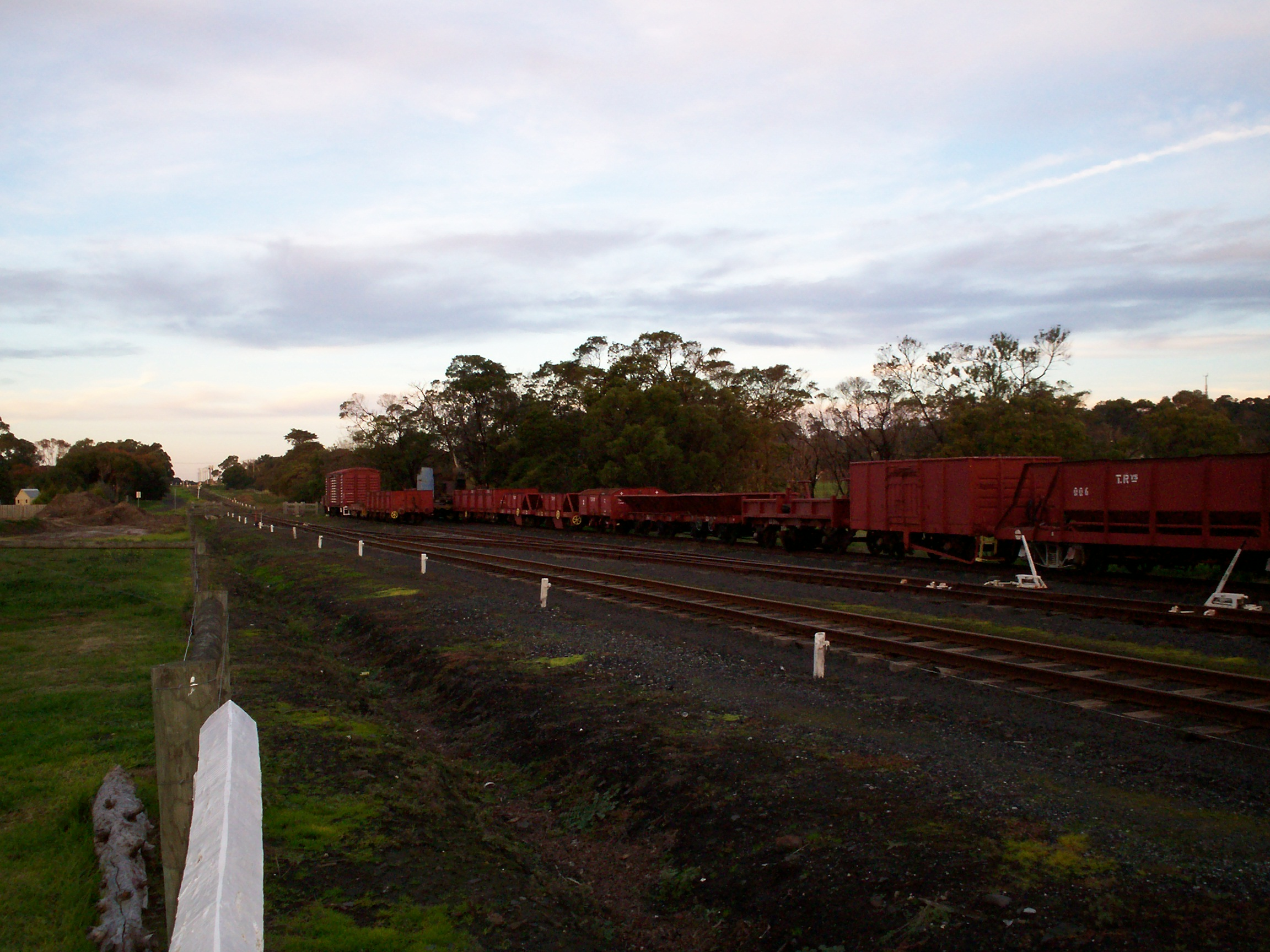
Goods Wagons at Drysdale in 2007

=== Early years ===
The station opened on 21 May 1879 at a cost of £514. Facilities provided included a 60 m (200 ft) passenger platform, a 45 m (150 ft) loading platform, a "barrel roof" goods shed, a van goods shed, a 2-ton hand crane, an 18-ton cart weighbridge, a telegraph office and tea stall. The station hosted passenger services as well as goods until 1931 when the regular passenger service ceased. Only summer Sunday excursion trains were available for passengers after this date, although riding in the guards van of goods trains was permitted.

=== Second World War ===
The Second World War saw a huge increase in traffic on the line with troop specials (returning troops for R&R), and ordnance trains carrying mines manufactured at RAN Swan Island (Queenscliff). Typical inwards goods at Drysdale were coal and briquettes, farm equipment and beer, while outwards goods were bricks, flax and market produce.

=== Postwar decline ===
After the war weekly goods services and summer excursion trains continued through Drysdale, though rail services declined until the line closed briefly in 1959, reopening late the same year largely to benefit one customer – a shell grit (glass making) mining company at Laker's Siding near Queenscliff. Station facilities were gradually removed; the station master was withdrawn in 1953, and the nadir was reached in 1972 with the sale and removal of the station building. Upon closure of the line in 1976, the only facilities remaining were the van goods shed and about 12 m (40 ft) of platform.

=== Revival ===
Since reopening by the Bellarine Peninsula Railway in 1979, all objects and structures on the site have been constructed, or reconstructed, by volunteers. As of late 2009, the traffic pattern is of two services, three days each week, year-round, with additional charter and summer trips. The line carries more traffic than it has done previously. Drysdale Station has won several awards for the Bellarine Railway in the areas of heritage preservation, presentation and the recycling of materials.

Drysdale Station also sees heavy use by patrons of the Bellarine Rail Trail of which Drysdale is the mid (and highest) point.

Preceding station	Heritage railways	Following station
Moolap (toward South Geelong)	Bellarine Railway	Suma Park (toward Queenscliff)
Entire line
