= Queenscliff railway station =

Railway station in Victoria, Australia

Coordinates: 38°15′51″S 144°39′42″E

Queenscliff
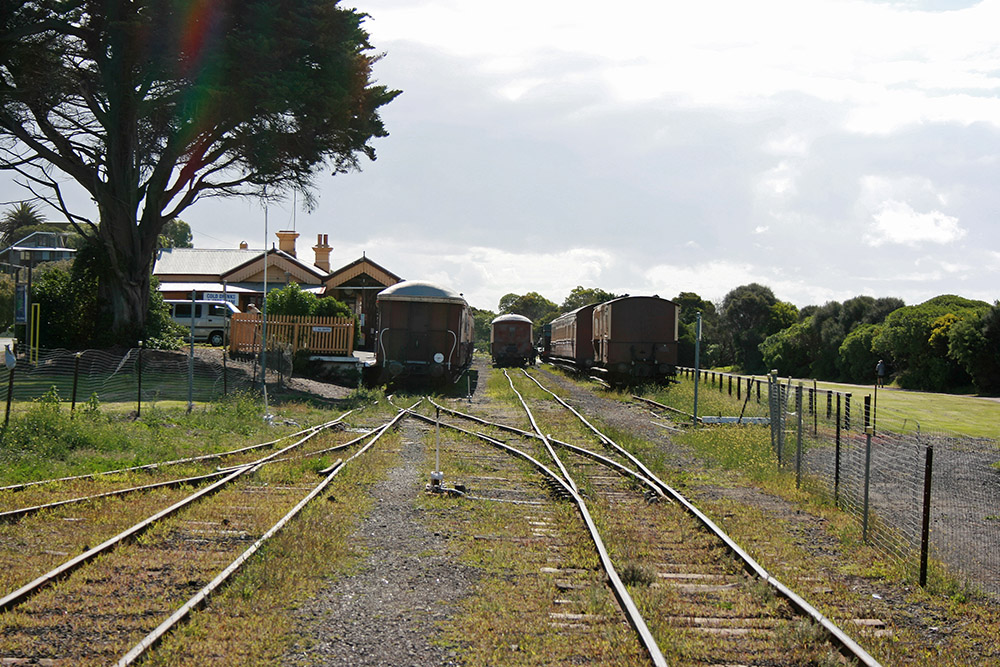
- Looking west along the Bellarine Peninsula Railway to Queenscliff Station. At right is the Bellarine Rail Trail

General information
- System: Bellarine Peninsula Railway station
- Lines: Bellarine Peninsula Railway former Queenscliff Line
- Platforms: 1
- Tracks: 1

Other information
- Status: Tourist station

History
- Opened: 21 May 1879; May 1979 (re-opened by the Bellarine Peninsula Railway)
- Closed: 6 November 1976
Location

Queenscliff railway station was the terminus of the Queenscliff branch line in Victoria, Australia, which left the main Warrnambool line near South Geelong station. The Queenscliff station was opened on 21 May 1879. The current station building was constructed in 1881 and is listed on the Victorian Heritage Register.

Between 1886 and 1958, a 3-foot gauge tramway linked the station to Swan Island, to serve the military facilities there.

The station was closed to all Victorian Railways services on 6 November 1976. After that, use of the branch line was granted to the Bellarine Peninsula Railway, which re-gauged part of the track to 3 ft 6 in (1,067 mm), and commenced tourist train operations from the station to Laker's Siding in May 1979, and to Drysdale not long after.

The railway reserve between Drysdale and the Warrnambool line at South Geelong is now used by the Bellarine Rail Trail.

Preceding station	Heritage railways	Following station
Drysdale	Bellarine Peninsula Railway	Terminus
Entire line
