= Fyansford Cement Works Railway =

Former industrial railway in Victoria, Australia

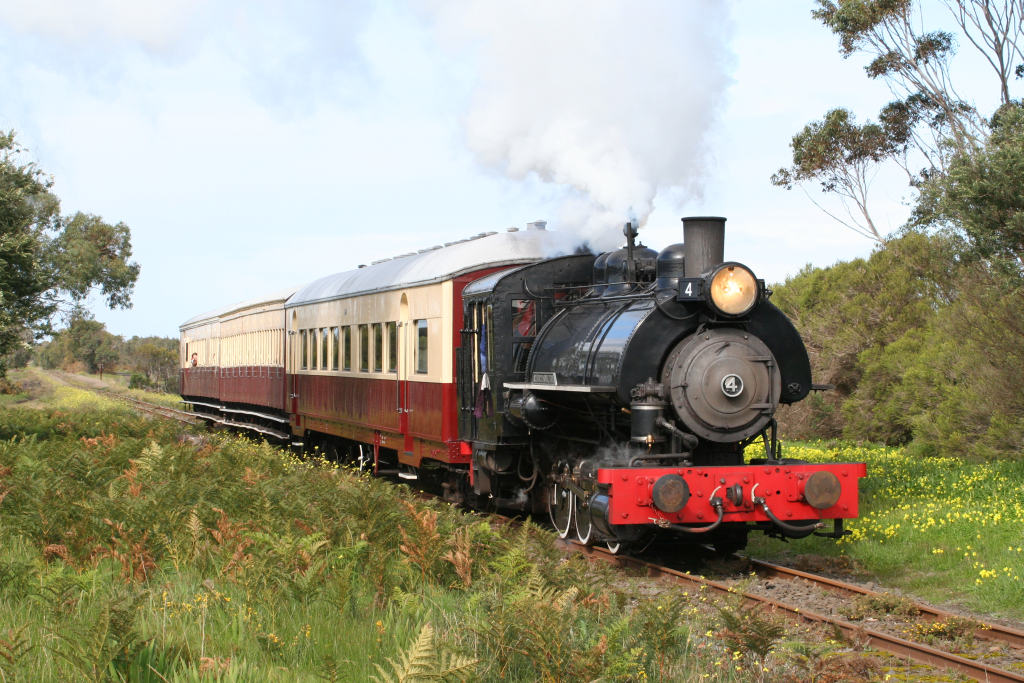
Former Fyansford locomotive No. 4, hauling a tourist train at the Bellarine Railway in 2007

The Fyansford Cement Works Railway was an industrial railway near Geelong, Australia, built by the Australian Portland Cement Company to carry limestone from its quarry to its cement works at Fyansford.

The railway was notable for including a 1.3 km (0.81 mi) tunnel, the longest rail tunnel in Victoria apart from the underground sections of the Melbourne City Loop. It had a fleet of one diesel and 11 steam locomotives, the majority of which have been preserved by heritage railway operators, in particular the Bellarine Railway.

== History ==
The line was built in 1926, replacing an earlier overhead ropeway from the quarry to the main works. The railway had two main sections: one from the works depot to an older quarry, and a longer track which used the tunnel and connected to a newer quarry. The length of the main line from the new quarry to the depot was 5.6 km (3.5 mi). The rail track had a gauge of 3 ft 6 in (1,067 mm), one not often used in Victoria, where the predominant rail gauge was 5 ft 3 in (1,600 mm).

The cement works railway operated until 1966, when it was replaced by an above-ground conveyor belt between a new crushing works on the quarry floor and the cement works. At the time of its closure, the railway's motive power consisted of a diesel-electric locomotive (which was sold to the Victorian Railways), and six steam locomotives, which were donated to preservation societies.

== Locomotives ==
Of the original twelve locomotives, seven (one diesel and six steam locomotives) are still in existence. Following the relocation of the Australian Standard Garratt from the Newport Railway Museum to Queenscliff in May 2013, all six steam locomotives existing at the time of the line's closure were in preservation at the Bellarine Railway.

Number	Builder	Year built	Wheel arrangement	Status	Notes
1	Beyer, Peacock & Company, Manchester, England	1938	2-6-0+0-6-2 Garratt	Scrapped	Some components from this locomotive were integrated into sister locomotive No. 2 when it was overhauled, similar to Western Australian Government Railways Msa class
2	Beyer, Peacock & Company	1938	2-6-0+0-6-2 Garratt	Stored at the Bellarine Railway	Was on display at the Puffing Billy Railway's museum at Menzies Creek until 2010, before relocation to the Bellarine Railway for eventual restoration.
3	Victorian Railways, Newport Workshops	1945	4-8-2+2-8-4 Garratt	In workshops at the Bellarine Railway	The last remaining complete Australian Standard Garratt. Moved on 31 May 2013 from the Newport Railway Museum to the Bellarine Railway, for restoration.
4	Vulcan Iron Works, Wilkes-Barre, Pennsylvania, United States	1916	0-6-0T	Stored at the Bellarine Railway	Originally used at the Henderson Naval Base, Western Australia, acquired by APC in 1926, along with loco 5.
5	Vulcan Iron Works	1916	0-6-0T	Stored at the Bellarine Railway	Stored in park in Ringwood before removal for restoration.
6	Hudswell Clarke, Leeds, England	1903	0-4-2T	Stored at the Bellarine Railway	Originally used as a shunter at the Wallaroo & Moonta Mining & Smelting Co's copper smelter in Wallaroo, South Australia. before acquisition by APC, along with locos 7-9. Named Wesley B. McCann after being donated to the Belmont Common Railway.
7	Hudswell Clarke		0-4-2T	Scrapped	See no. 6
8	Hudswell Clarke		0-4-2T	Scrapped	See no. 6
9	Hudswell Clarke		0-4-2T	Scrapped	See no. 6
10	Perry Engineering, Adelaide	1926	0-4-0T	Scrapped	Originally used by the State Rivers & Water Supply Commission of Victoria in construction of the Hume Weir. Acquired by APC in 1946, along with number 11 from State Electricity Commission of Victoria.
11	Perry Engineering	1926	0-4-0T	Under restoration at the Bellarine Railway	Was on display at the Puffing Billy Railway's museum at Menzies Creek until June 2010, when it was relocated for eventual restoration.
D1	Clyde Engineering, Sydney	1956	Bo-Bo	Operational at 707 Operations	Bought new by APC and named Wesley B. McCann, sold to the Victorian Railways in 1966, regauged to 5'3" and renumbered T413
