= Tasmanian Government Railways DP class =

Tasmanian diesel railcar class

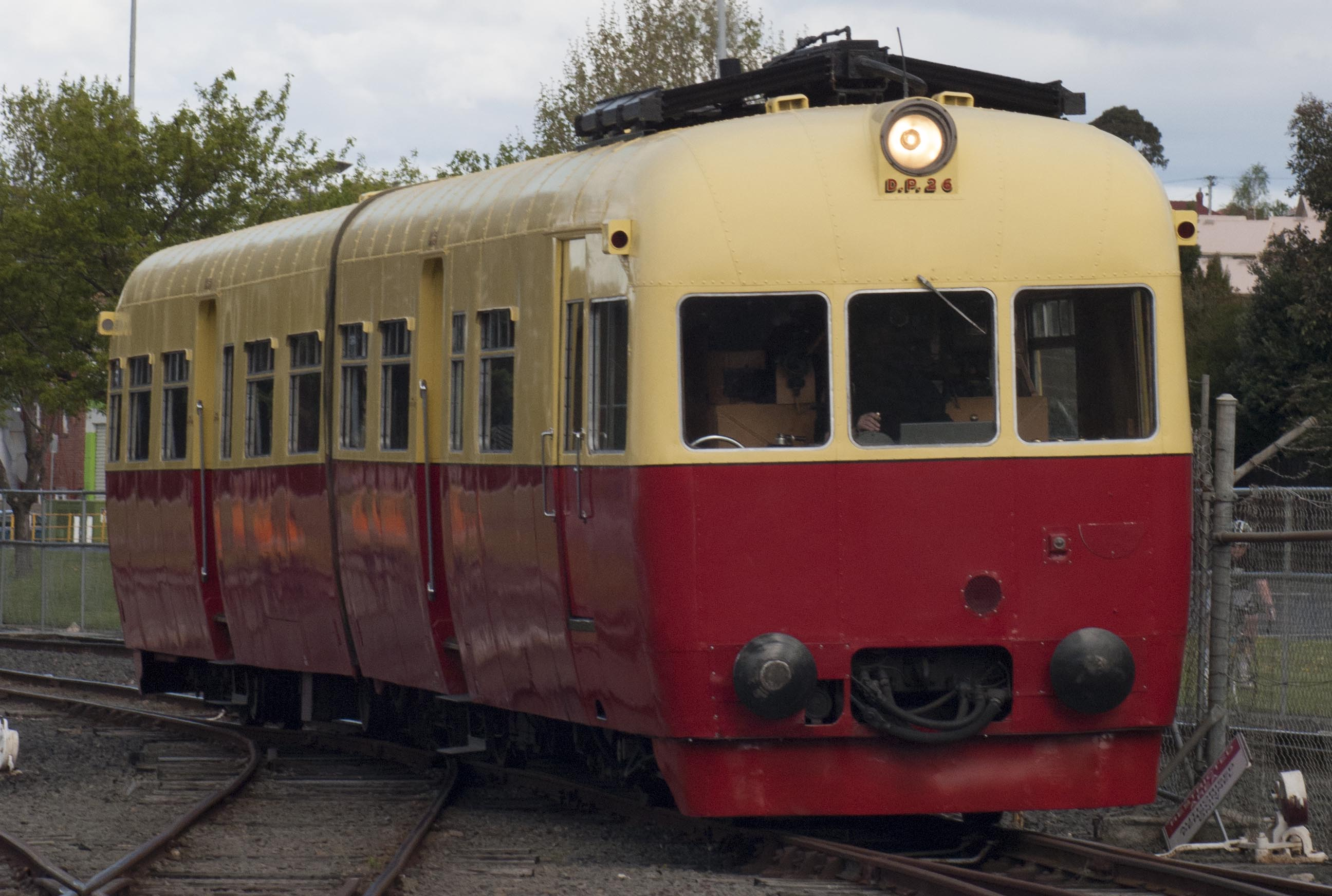
- DP26 at the Tasmanian Transport Museum in October 2012
- Manufacturers: Drewry Car Co; Tasmanian Government Railways; Commonwealth Engineering
- Entered service: 1937-1950
- Number built: 27
- Fleet numbers: DP2-DP5, DP7, DP9-DP30
- Operator: Tasmanian Government Railways

Specifications
- Track gauge: 1,067 mm (3 ft 6 in)

The Tasmanian Government Railways DP class is a class of diesel railcars operated by the Tasmanian Government Railways.

== History ==
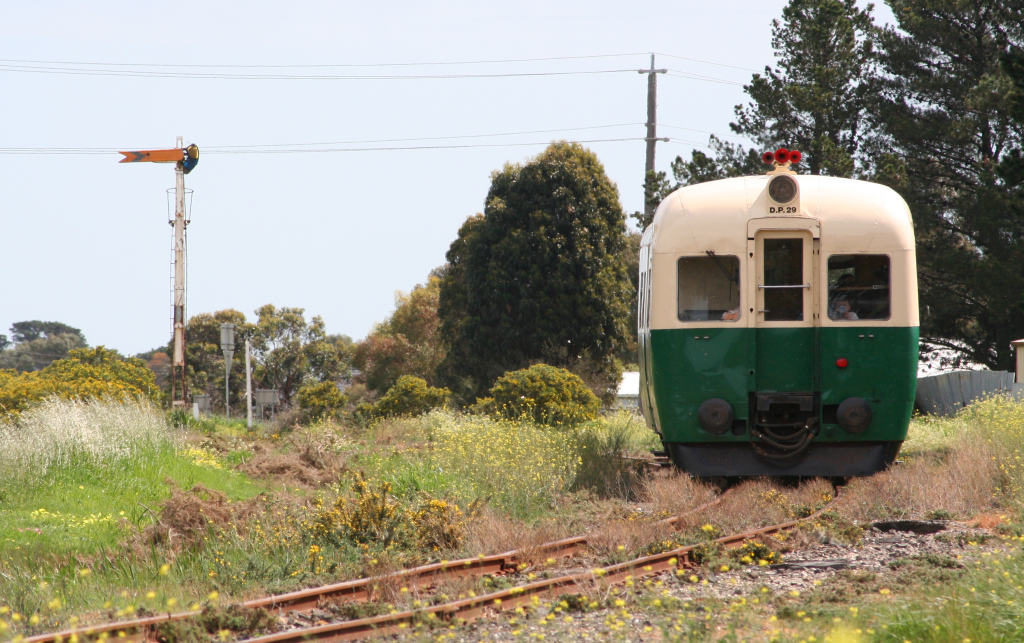
DP29 on the Bellarine Railway In September 2007

The DP class diesel railcars comprised eight different batches of vehicles. The early members were originally petrol powered wooden bodied rail motors while the latter units were articulated units. These latter units were initially used on the Tasman Limited when it was introduced in April 1954 until locomotive hauled stock was built. Some lasted in service until the cessation of passenger services in 1978. One was retained until 1996 as a track inspection vehicle.

Eight have been preserved:

- DP13 at the DownsSteam Tourist Railway & Museum, Queensland
- DP14 at Karoola railway station
- DP15 at the Tasmanian Transport Museum
- DP22 at the Don River Railway
- DP24 as part of the Margate Train
- DP26 at the Tasmanian Transport Museum
- DP28 at the Bellarine Railway, Victoria
- DP29 at the Bellarine Railway, Victoria
