= Tasman Limited =

Passenger train in Tasmania, 1954 and 1978

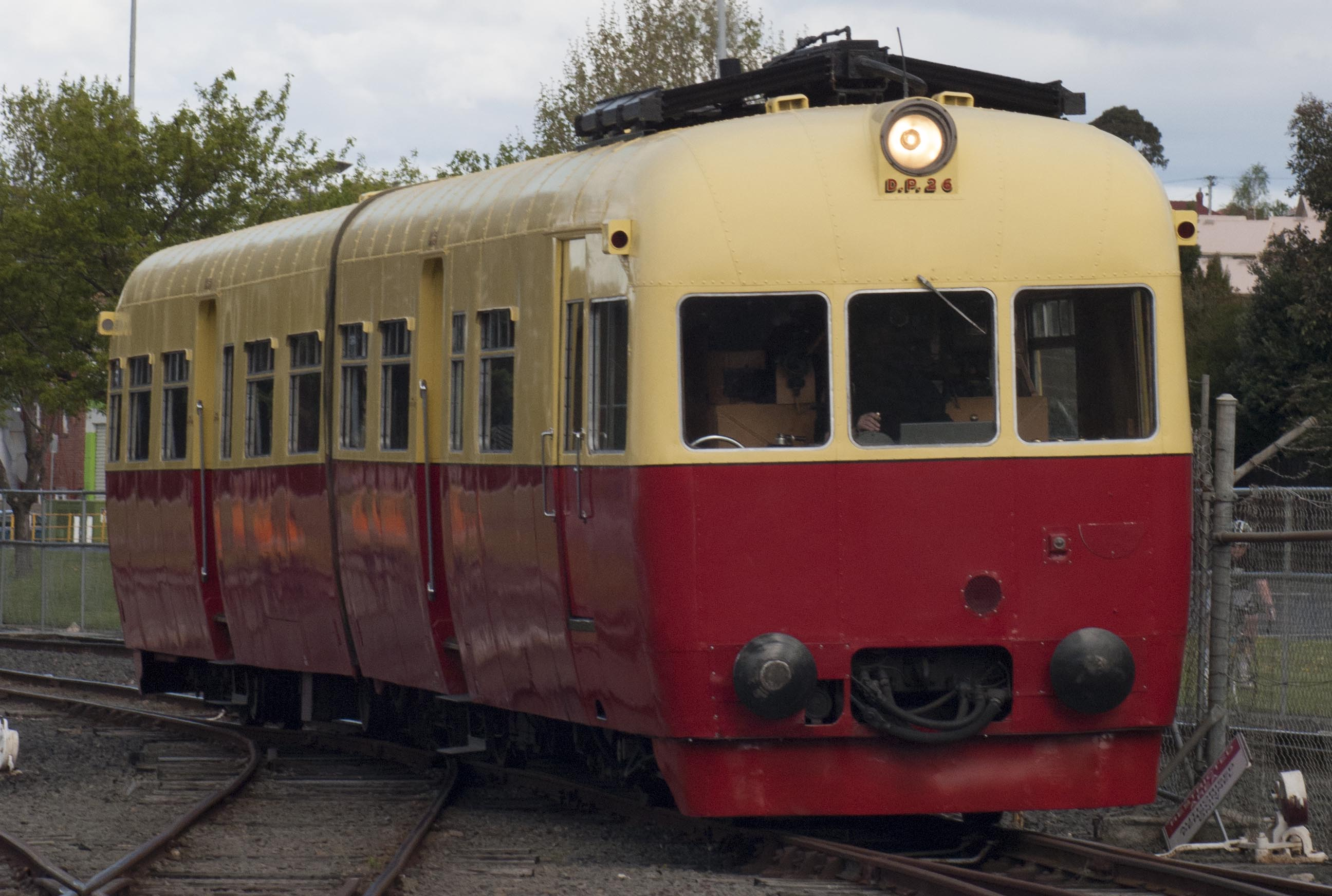
- DP Class railcar, as used on the initial Tasman Limited services in 1954/55

Overview
- Service type: Passenger train
- Status: Ceased
- First service: 5 April 1954
- Last service: 28 July 1978
- Former operator: Tasmanian Government Railways

Route
- Termini: Hobart; Wynyard
- Stops: Derwent Park, Granton, Brighton, Campania, Colebrook, Parattah, Ross, Campbell Town, Conara Jnc, Western Jnc, Longford, Westbury, Deloraine, Dunorlan, Kimberley, Railton, Latrobe, Devonport, Leith, Ulverstone, Penguin, Burnie, Somerset.
- Distance travelled: 378 kilometres
- Average journey time: 8 hours
- Service frequency: daily
- Lines used: Main Line; Western Line

On-board services
- Seating arrangements: paired seating (window & aisle), additional seating offered during peak times
- Catering facilities: onboard buffet service
- Entertainment facilities: piped music
- Baggage facilities: baggage facilities on train & at stations
- Other facilities: intrastate mail service (until 1976) Parcels service (until 1977)

Technical
- Track gauge: 3’6” (1067mm)
- Operating speed: variable. Maximum track speed was 45mph/70kmh.
- Track owners: Tasmanian Government Railways (until July 1975), Australian National Railways Commission (from July 1975)
- Timetable numbers: 1. 40 (Hobart to Western Jnc); 2. 223 (Western Jnc to Wynyard); 3. 226 (Wynyard to Western Jnc); 4. 67 (Western Jnc to Hobart)

The Tasman Limited was a passenger train operated by Tasmanian Government Railways (TGR) on the Main and Western lines between Hobart, Launceston and Wynyard from April 1954 to July 1978.

The service has the distinction of being the last regularly scheduled passenger train in Tasmania.

== Commencement of service ==
With the introduction of the X Class diesel locomotives in 1950, Tasmania became the first state in Australia to operate diesel locomotives on a mainline rail network. Their delivery heralded the modernisation of the system by the Tasmanian Transport Commission, operator of the TGR. Other initiatives were the introduction of diesel-mechanical shunting locomotives (from 1948) and the redevelopment of Hobart's railway station in 1953. The decision of the TGR to introduce a new intrastate passenger service however, was courageous. The Philips Report of 1953 had recommended the withdrawal of all country passenger services due to steadily decreasing patronage as more people turned to the private motor car as their primary means of travel.

In 1949 and 1950, the TGR took delivery of six 153hp articulated DP class railcars built by Commonwealth Engineering in Clyde, New South Wales. With seating for 58 passengers, they were initially rostered on the Hobart to Launceston Evening Service. In September 1950, they were used on a new limited-stops morning service between the two cities, working in pairs (DP + DP). Three railcars (DP27, DP28, DP29) were upgraded with carpeting, curtains and hot meal facilities.

The journey was extended through to the North West Coast in April 1953 when the Evening Service was converted to a locomotive-hauled train, thus making all articulated railcars available for the morning service. It operated three days per week (South-bound: Monday, Wednesday, Friday; and Northbound: Tuesday, Thursday, Saturday). On 5 April 1954, the TGR decided to maximise the train’s popularity by giving it a name (Tasman Limited) and promotion of the service was increased. The TGR described the train as “cheapest & best in travel comfort.”

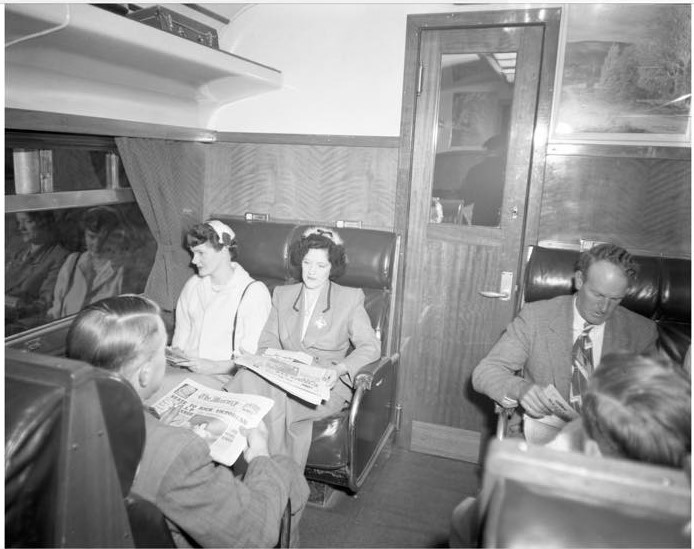
Interior scene of a DP Class articulated railcar in service

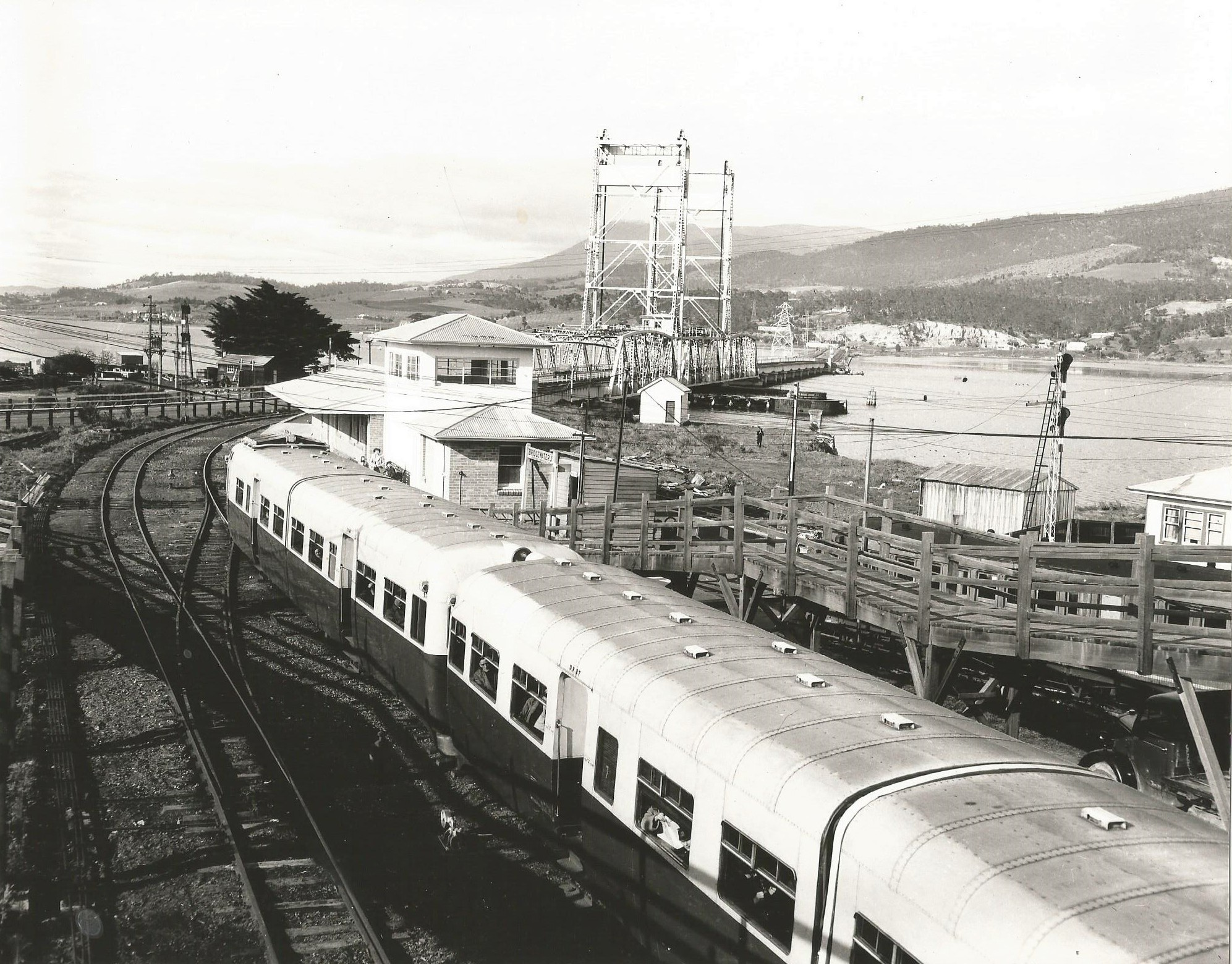
Morning railcar service paused at Bridgewater Junction, en route to Hobart, 1952. This service later became the 'Tasman Limited'.

== Destination name boards ==
The railcars carried a destination name-board on their front sides, depending on the direction of travel:

- Hobart to Launceston was The Tamar
- Launceston to Wynyard was Table Cape
- Wynyard to Launceston was The Launcestonian
- Launceston to Hobart was The Derwent

== Timetable ==
The north-bound Tasman Limited ('Tamar': Tuesday, Thursday, Saturday) departed Hobart at 08:36, and arrived in Launceston at 13:08, stopping for passengers only at Derwent Park Junction and Western Junction. The east-bound train ('Launcestonian': Monday, Wednesday, Friday) departed Wynyard at 08:30 and arrived in Launceston at 13:19. The south-bound service ('The Derwent': Monday, Wednesday, Friday) departed Launceston at 12:30 and arrived in the capital at 17:03. The west-bound service ('Table Cape': Tuesday, Thursday, Saturday) departed Launceston at 12:22 and terminated at Wynyard at 17:10. Both trains on each day crossed at Western Junction, and passengers could change trains for their journey towards either Wynyard or Hobart. A meal service and light refreshments were available only on the Main Line leg between Hobart and Launceston.

On 6 December 1954, the TGR expanded the frequency to a daily service (Monday to Saturday), except Sunday. The route operation was changed slightly and 'The Tamar' section was dropped. Hobart to Wynyard became one long section named 'Table Cape', whilst the 'Launcestonian' and 'The Derwent' sections remained unchanged. The train crossing point at Western Junction remained in place.

== Conversion to locomotive-hauled train ==
With patronage increasing, the TGR decided to upgrade the service to a locomotive-hauled train. Two unique articulated carriages were built at the Launceston Railway Workshops. With seating for 76 passengers, they featured large panoramic windows, a central buffet/kitchen and luxurious passenger fittings such as fully-upholstered seating with head and foot rests (including ‘antimacassars’), fluorescent lighting, curtains, and pressure ventilation/heating. Fold-out dinner trays slotted into the sides of each seat. They had a toilet and small guard’s compartment at each end. Each pair of seats could be rotated to face the direction of travel. The new cars were classed 'ACS' ('Articulated Country Saloon'). Their low profile appearance was modelled on a prototype carriage constructed in 1954 (ABL1), which was sold to the Emu Bay Railway (EBR). The EEP ‘express freight’ bogie vans were also built to the same streamlined body design.

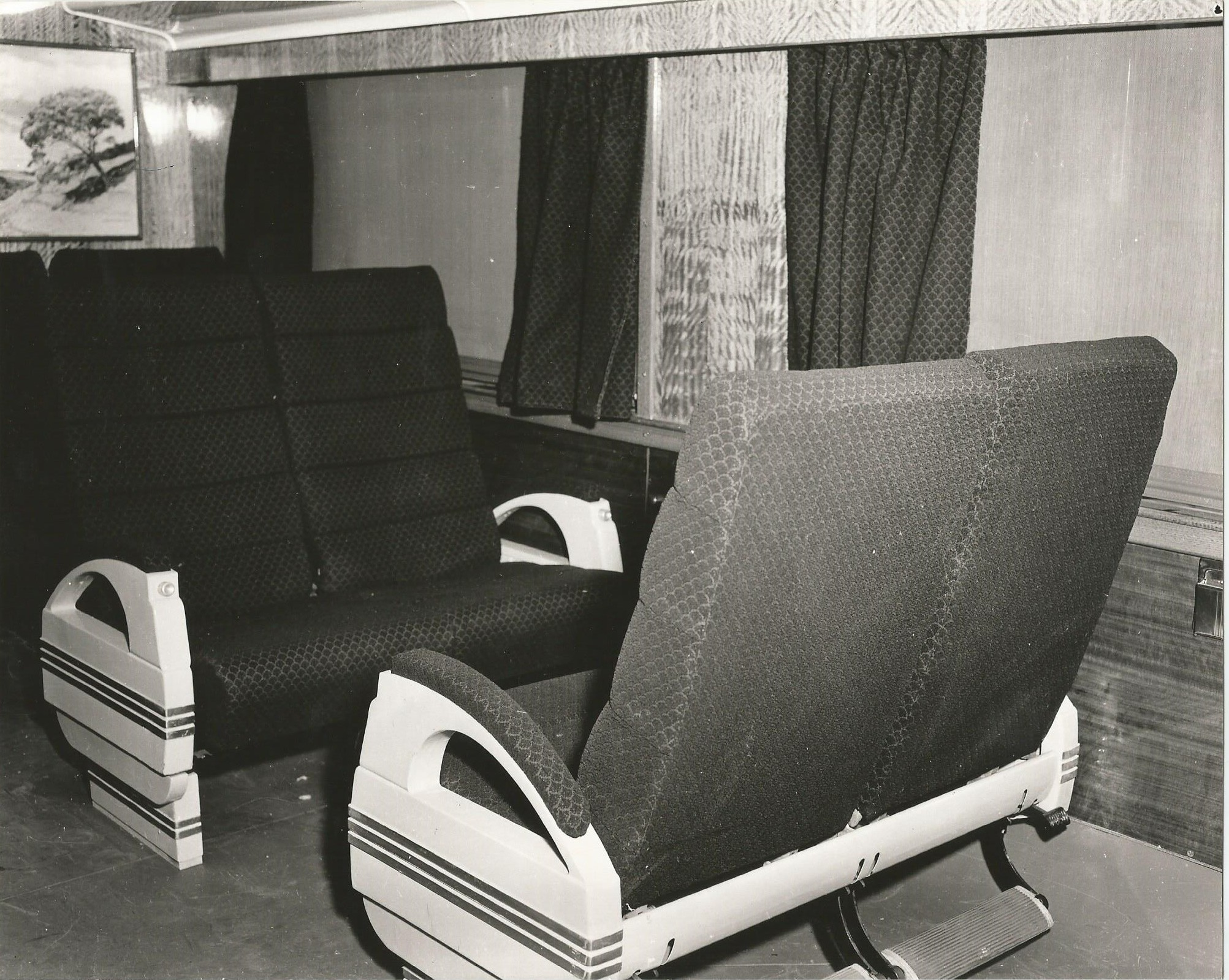
ACS car interior, showing fabric seats with head rests and buttons to adjust back position. Each two-seat pair can be swivelled to face the opposite direction.

The timetable was kept the same as the previous railcar service but there was a further slight change in routing. The train now bypassed Launceston all together. The north-bound train ran direct from Hobart to Wynyard ('Table Cape') whilst the south-bound train ran direct from Wynyard to Hobart ('Launcestonian' to Western Junction, then 'Derwent' to Hobart). At Western Junction a connecting service was provided for passengers travelling to and from Launceston.

On 15 December 1955, the new train entered service. It was hauled by X Class 660hp diesel-electric locomotives, and a headboard with ‘The Tasman Limited’ painted on it was attached to the front of the locomotive for easy identification from a distance.

== Livery ==
The ACS cars were painted in a bright livery which was commonly referred to as 'blood and custard'; deep red on the lower body half and cream on the top body half. This colour scheme was soon adopted as the standard livery for all TGR passenger rolling stock. When introduced, the X Class diesel locomotives were painted in a dark green but by 1955 the fleet had been repainted to red with a cream stripe that ended in a chevron at each end. In 1971 a new locomotive livery was introduced, which was all-over yellow with black tiger stripes at both ends.

== Feeder service ==
Both trains were timetabled to meet at Western Junction and a feeder service was provided to and from Launceston. This connector train was operated by the same DP Class railcars as before (Nos. 25-30), but would also be frequently operated by a locomotive-hauled train, depending on what rolling stock was available. Typically an X Class diesel locomotive with Clyde Engineering-built cars (BBL, AAR), or a Sentinel Cammell former steam-powered railcar converted to composite carriage (SP Class), would be used. On mail days an EEP van would be transferred from the Tasman Limited trains to the feeder service, for delivery into Launceston.

In 1971, in an attempt to lift the standard of the feeder service to that of the main service, the run between Launceston and Western Junction was upgraded to provide a tea and coffee service complete with its own onboard hostess. A typist was sent from the TGR office pool for the short return journey, then returned to her main work back in Launceston. Carriages AAR4, BBL10, BBL11 were renovated especially for the revamped service.

In 1973 and again in 1974, steam locomotive H2 was occasionally rostered on the Feeder Service. For a period between 1976 and 1977, the Feeder Service was replaced by a bus whilst the railway formation between Western Junction and Relbia was upgraded.

== Additional rolling stock ==
In 1955, three of the EEP Class 'express freight' vans were converted to brake vans for use on the Tasman Limited and reclassified as 'DZ' Class. The typical Tasman Limited passenger set makeup was: ACS + DZ, in each direction. In October 1956 a third ACS car (ACS3) was constructed and in December 1958 a fourth ACS car (ACS4) entered service. This increased capacity and enabled it each train to utilise two ACS cars in its consist on a regular basis. Its extended length required the use of two X Class diesel locomotives but on some occasions a more powerful 825hp Y Class diesel locomotive was used as an alternative.

By 1958, two additional freight vans were converted to 'DA' Class, which featured accommodation for 16 passengers at one end, guard's compartment and parcels/luggage storage. The typical passenger set now consisted of: ACS + ACS + DA + DZ. In addition to the ACS cars, older Clyde Engineering-built cars were pressed into service when passenger demand required. These included the AAR and BBL Class cars, and the more modern SS Class and SSS Class ('Suburban Saloon') carriages were also used from time to time. A spare SS Class carriage was often kept on standby in a siding at Devonport for when bookings were high.

== Buffet service ==
The Tasman Limited was staffed by a crew of hostesses who prepared meals and served refreshments to passengers. Hot meals were served in winter and cold meals served during the warmer months. Beer, soft drinks and ice creams were also available. Scones with jam and cream were served for morning tea. The hostesses attended to passenger needs and managed the train manifest. They offered passengers cushions for increased comfort and attended to babies’ needs by warming milk bottles. They collected requests for connecting taxis which were passed on to station staff and phoned through to the larger stations. They ensured passengers alighted and boarded the correct train when changing at Western Junction. At Hobart and Wynyard, hostesses stocked the buffets, and walked through the train swivelling the seats to face the correct direction. Regular passengers got to know the hostess staff personally.

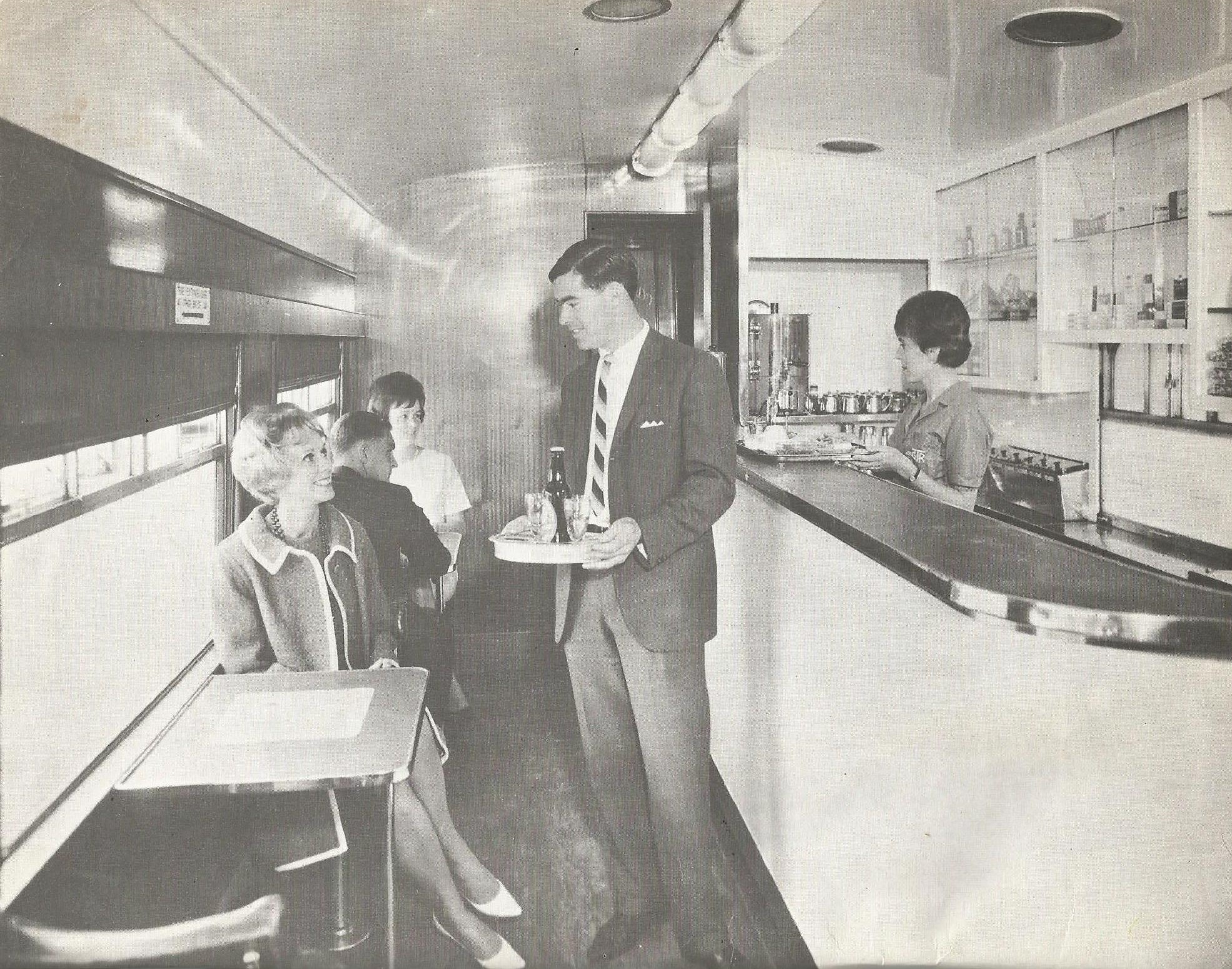

The friendly hospitality and relaxed onboard atmosphere helped to underpin the train’s reputation. The Tasman Limited became an institution with a generation of Tasmanians, particularly those who lived in remote and regional areas who heavily relied on the service. The train was the pride of the TGR and it ensured the carriages’ external appearance was kept in excellent condition. It was given priority where possible when crossing with other trains on the network. Railway staff were often issued general notices reminding them of the importance of keeping the Tasman Limited on time and in top condition.

The Tasman Limited’s name evoked strong imagery of luxury and service, as well as an emotional connection with people who either rode on it or who were rostered to work on it. Locomotive crew who drove the Tasman Limited (driver and fireman) or who were guards were senior crew who had earned their position to work the ‘Tasman’. They were held in high esteem by their colleagues.

In later years, there was an experiment playing specially-recorded music from the Tasmanian Symphony Orchestra over the carriage public-address system.

== Cartage of mail ==
In 1956, the Tasman Limited became an important link in the distribution of interstate mail across Tasmania. This increased markedly after the MS ‘Princess of Tasmania’ commenced sailing between Melbourne and Devonport in 1959. A Grover bogie van (EP Class) was coupled to the rear of the train on ferry days to carry the additional mail. However, the vans were prone to derailing and in 1968 they were replaced by the EEP Class bogie freight vans. The TGR developed the only system in Australia to operate UK-style mechanical mail-exchange equipment. A mechanical 'arm' mounted on a frame was positioned inside the DZ van whilst a 'catch' hook and hoop apparatus, mounted on a free-standing frame was positioned along the line at various stations. As the train passed by at low speed, the arm inside the van was swung out and the mail bag was captured on the external collection apparatus. The train lost the mail service to the airlines in February 1976.

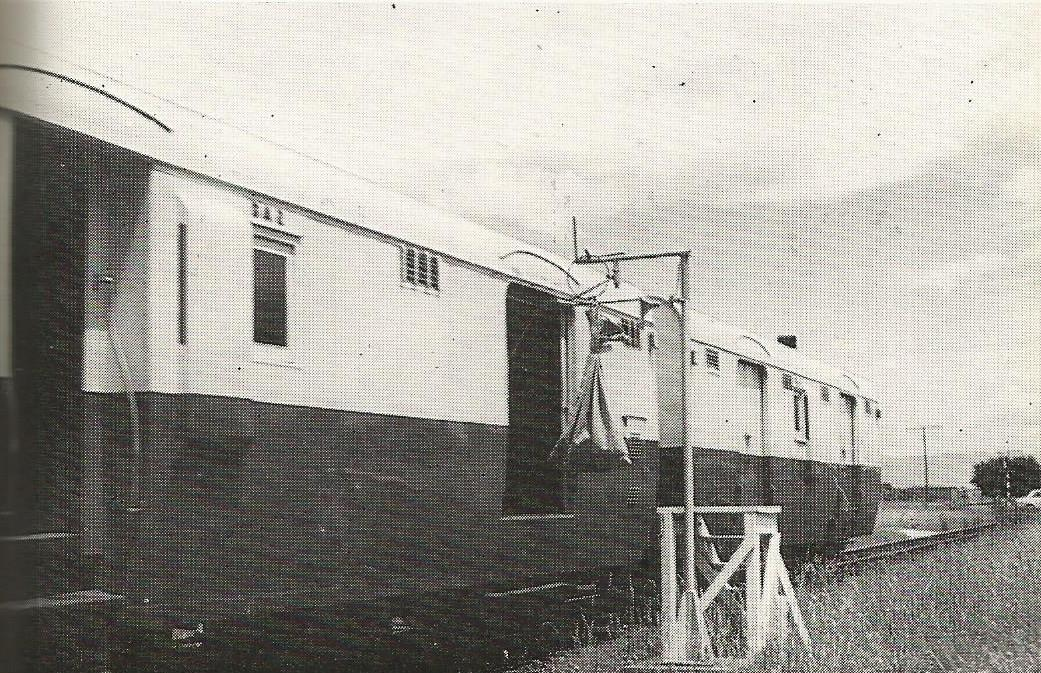
Mail exchange equipment in operation at Perth, as the Tasman Limited passes by at low speed

== Operations ==
The arrival and departure procedure at Western Junction was a unique event. As the station was located within a turning triangle (or 'wye' in Tasmanian parlance), each train entered the platform by performing a reverse shunt. The Wynyard-bound train arrived by traversing the western leg of the 'wye', then reversing into the Western Line platform. The Hobart-bound train arrived a few minutes later, and also traversed the Western leg of the 'wye' before reversing into the Main Line platform. The Feeder Service to and from Launceston also shared the Main Line platform with the Hobart train. An operational requirement of the service was that luggage and mail vans (DZ, EEP Class) be coupled to the train immediately behind the locomotives leaving Hobart, and coupled to the rear of the train leaving Wynyard. This was to ensure that the vans were positioned fully on the platform at Western Junction, to enable swift loading and unloading of goods, luggage, and parcels.

On 14 December 1972, the Western Junction to Hobart train was hauled by new 'super power' locomotive Z1 as a test run before it entered full service hauling log trains on the newly-constructed Bell Bay Line. The high-powered locomotive returned the passenger train north the following day.

The length of the train could vary considerably, depending on the time of year and passenger loadings. During holiday periods the train would often have additional carriages added whilst during winter the consist could be just two ACS cars and two vans. One of the longest trains to run occurred on 5 October 1974 when the train from Hobart consisted of an EEP van, two DZ vans, three ACS cars and a DA van. The additional ACS car was used for the Australian Railway Exploration Association group which was conducting a tour of Tasmania at the time. The large train required the use of two Y Class locomotives. One of the shortest trains to run was on 10 February 1971 when, as part of the TGR Centenary Celebrations, all four ACS cars were required at Deloraine for Centenary festivities. The south-bound Tasman Limited between Deloraine and Hobart consisted only of locomotive X13 hauling Clyde car AAR4 and vans DZ3 and DZ2.

At the conclusion of each day's running the passenger rolling stock was shunted into a shed for inspection and the ACS cars were overhauled at the Launceston Railway Workshops on an annual basis.

== Journey times ==
By 1978, the Tasman Limited took four hours and 18 minutes to reach Western Junction from Hobart, and a further four hours and 6 minutes to arrive at Wynyard; a total of 8 hours and 24 minutes. The journey from Wynyard to Hobart was slightly shorter. The Tasman was never considered a true "express" train even by the standards of the day. The windy nature of the track, particularly on the southern portion of the Main Line, denied the train its ability to travel at an optimum speed. The maximum speed on long straight sections of track on the network was 45mph (70 kmh). The train was never considered as an express service and the TGR focused advertising on its specialised service and arrangements, and was considered the state's great luxury passenger train. The increasing number of track speed restrictions along much of the network due to poor track condition also contributed to slow journey times.

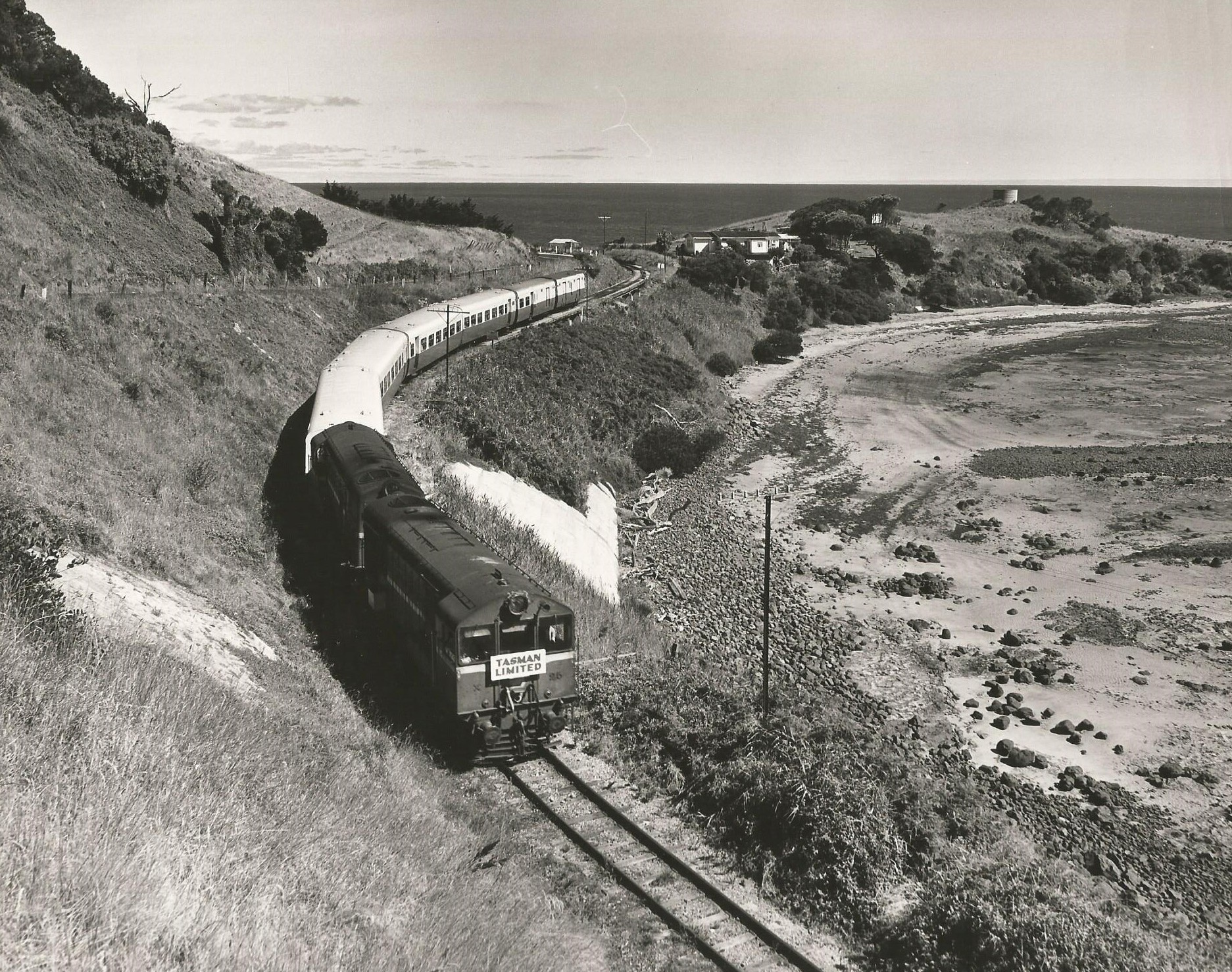
Tasman Limited travelling along North West Coast between Penguin and Ulverstone

== Incidents and derailments ==
The Tasman Limited experienced relatively few incidents during its 24 years of operation. There were occasional minor collisions with road vehicles on level crossings. During the catastrophic bushfires in Southern Tasmania on 7 February 1967, the Tasman Limited service was terminated at Parattah, and passengers conveyed by bus to Hobart via the Midland Highway. On 5 December 1970, the west-bound train collided with a lorry at the River Road level crossing at Wivenhoe, near Burnie. The train pushed the lorry into the Emu River and the leading locomotive, X8, was left partially submerged in the river. The locomotive crew and truck driver suffered only minor injuries. On 24 October 1977, the south-bound train derailed on the Main Line near Clarendon. Poor track condition was blamed for the derailment. The ACS car and DA van both ended on their sides. Some crew and passengers were taken to hospital but there were no lasting injuries. This derailment happened at a critical time for the Tasman Limited when its future was uncertain.

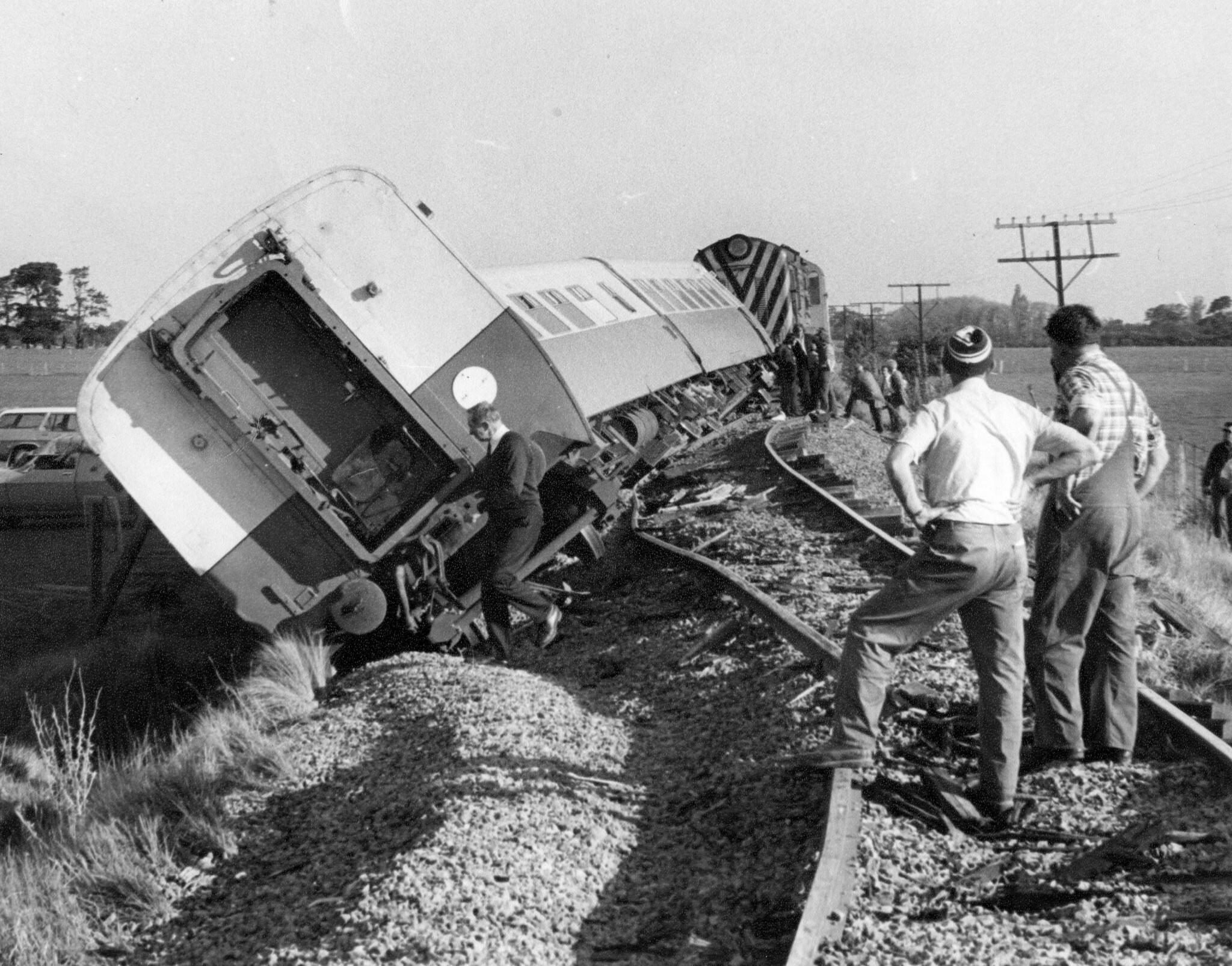
Derailment of southbound Tasman Limited between Evandale and Clarendon on the Main Line, 24 October 1977

== Change in ownership ==
On 1 July 1975, ownership of the TGR was handed over to the new Federal body ‘Australian National Railways Commission’ (ANR) which was tasked to operate economical rail services and withdraw those that were not viable. Full operational control of the TGR would not take place until 1978 and day-to-day operation of the system remained with the Transport Commission. In November 1976 the Joy Report into Tasmania’s Railways recommended the immediate withdrawal of the Tasman Limited due to sustained losses on the service, however a decision on its future was deferred.

== Decline and withdrawal ==
During the 1960s and 1970s, increased private car ownership and an improving road network contributed to the declining patronage of passenger rail services in Tasmania. In 1956/57 the TGR began withdrawing regional and branch line passenger services as they were no longer viable. Consequently, additional stops were gradually added to the Tasman Limited timetable which had the effect of slowing the journey down. This made it increasingly unattractive for travellers who were constrained by time.

In December 1974, the Tasmanian Government announced that all Hobart suburban rail services as well as the Friday and Sunday 'Evening Service' trains to and from Launceston would cease at year's end. This left the Tasman Limited and the Midlands Motor (a fortnightly diesel railcar service between Hobart and Parattah) as the only passenger trains operating in Tasmania. Some exceptions were suburban services to the annual Royal Hobart Show in October (until 1977), and occasional special excursions chartered by schools and other community groups from time to time.

In May 1977, the Transport Commission proposed to terminate the Tasman Limited service at suburban New Town, rather than at the Hobart Passenger Terminal. This was to enable construction of a slip-road through the Hobart Top Rail Yard and convert the Hobart station to a public car park. The railway unions fought against this plan and imposed a blockade of the slip-road site by positioning dis-used carriages across its path. The blockade was lifted when the Transport Commission agreed to union terms which, among others, included better marketing of the Tasman Limited to stem the flow of declining patronage. Another condition was that Federal assistance be sought for its continued operation. In August 1977, the Tasman Limited received a Federal Government subsidy to continue operating for six months and an advertising campaign was launched to encourage passengers back to the train.

On 1 March 1978, Australian National assumed full operational control of the Tasmanian Railways. It quickly reduced the service from six trips a week to three due to low patronage and increasing losses (Tuesday, Thursday, Friday). On 12 July 1978, ANR announced that the Tasman Limited and Midlands Motor railcar service would cease operating by the end of the month. A public outcry followed and local politicians lobbied the Federal Government to persuade ANR to keep the service going. ANR stated that the only reason it was withdrawing the train was because it was unprofitable and would gladly retain the service if an on-going subsidy was provided at government level.

== Last trains ==
The last Midlands Motor service operated on 21 July 1978 whilst the last Tasman Limited operated one week later, on 28 July 1978. Both Tasman Limited sets from Hobart and Wynyard were built up with extra carriages to cater for the high demand for seats. The north-bound train was operated by locomotives X29 + X17 hauling cars DA2 + ACS1 + ACS3 + AAR2 + BBL11 + SS2; and the south-bound train was made up of locomotives X20 + X16 hauling cars AAR4 + BBL12 + ACS4 + ACS2 + DA1. The final Feeder Service from Launceston to Western Junction was operated by railcars DP27 and DP28. Lines of cars followed both trains through urban areas whilst school groups boarded the train at various locations. Hostess staff who worked the last trains were given bouquets of flowers from passengers. At both Hobart and Wynyard terminals, the environmental organisation ‘Friends of the Earth’ staged a sit-in inside the train, to demonstrate the environmental and social impact resulting from the loss of the passenger service. Police were on hand at both Hobart and Wynyard to ensure peace was maintained.

The railway unions attempted to undertake the operation of the service themselves but this proved impracticable. In August 1978 the Tasmanian Government commissioned an inquiry into the train’s withdrawal, which was headed by Sir Henry Bland. The inquiry eventually found in ANR’s favour but noted its loss could have a high psychological impact on Tasmania. Hostess staff were redeployed to goods handling or office administration duties.

== Removal of passenger facilities ==
Following the withdrawal of the Tasman Limited, most stations and other passenger infrastructure was gradually demolished or removed from rail property, as ANR focused on upgrading the network purely as a bulk-freight railway. The station at Western Junction was demolished and replaced with an office; the Wynyard station was demolished; and the Hobart Rail Terminal was converted into a public commuter car park. In November 1984 it too, was demolished and the site cleared for a new ABC radio and administration complex which was completed in 1987. ABC Television moved to the site in 1993. Only the 1874 Tasmanian Main Line Railway Company (TMLR) station building survived, and was incorporated into the ABC development.

== Preservation of rolling stock ==
All passenger rolling stock used on the Tasman Limited has survived in one form or another. Following withdrawal of the service, railway unions placed a ban on the removal of the ACS cars from the rails. The ban was short-lived, however, and ANR advertised the cars for sale by tender in mid 1979. ACS1 was relocated to a road-side reserve near Margate in November of the same year. It was joined by a diesel railcar (DP24) and four SS Class carriages, together with retired Pacific-type steam locomotive MA3. The rolling stock was developed into a series of shops called the Margate Train. One half of ACS4 became a pancake restaurant with the seats and buffet/kitchen being retained for use.

Carriages commonly used on the Feeder Service (AAR2, BBL11, BBL12) and van DZ2, were preserved by the Van Diemen Light Railway Society (Don River Railway). Some locomotives and railcars used on the Tasman Limited were also preserved. The Don River Railway acquired locomotives X4 and Y6; the Tasmanian Transport Museum acquired X1; the Bellarine Peninsula Railway preserved locomotives X3 and X20; whilst the Derwent Valley Railway preserved locomotives X10, X18, X30, and Y2.

Railcar DP26 was preserved by the Tasmanian Transport Museum Society, whilst the Bellarine Peninsula Railway preserved railcars DP28 and DP29.

Carriages ACS2 and ACS3 were purchased by the Hillwood Strawberry Farm in the Tamar Valley. The owners also purchased retired Mountain-type steam locomotive H5 with a plan to locate the rolling stock to the strawberry farm, in a similar fashion to the Margate Train concept. However, only H5 was relocated to Hillwood and the two ACS cars remained stored at Western Junction. In 1986, the cars were leased to Tasmanian Locomotive Company, which was restoring retired steam locomotive H2 to operating condition, and which had plans to operate tourist trains on the ANR Tasmanian network. The cars were repainted in 'Cadbury purple' in acknowledgement of the Cadbury Chocolate Factory at Claremont which housed the rolling stock in their rail yard. The company’s inaugural excursion on 4 April 1987 featured a ‘Tasman Limited’ headboard mounted to the front of steam locomotive H2. During 1989, the carriages were repainted to ‘Cascade blue’ as part of a sponsorship arrangement with the Cascade Brewery. The company operated a regular schedule of steam-hauled and diesel-hauled tourist trains until November 1990.

ACS4 was sold to a Victorian couple who had plans to convert it to a country retreat. Issues with the union ban forced the couple to reconsider their plans and they set about preparing the car for tourist trips on the ANR network. They acquired two additional carriages, ABL1 and ABL2 from the EBR. Operating as ‘Tasmanian Rail Tours’, they ran a series of excursions between March 1983 and July 1985, each time hiring an ANR diesel locomotive (Y or X Class) to haul the train. In 1986, Tasmanian Rail Tours sold ACS4 and the two ABL cars to Tasmanian Locomotive Company.

In 1991, the Derwent Valley Railway Preservation Society purchased all rolling stock from Tasmanian Locomotive Company and continued operating public excursions and charters. In December 1993, the Society relocated to a permanent depot at New Norfolk from where excursions were run. On some Mainline excursions and over-night tours, the Society placed a Tasman Limited headboard on the leading locomotive to recreate the look of the famous train. All three ACS cars were used extensively on excursions and in recent years, the Society has focused on their maintenance, care, and repainting.

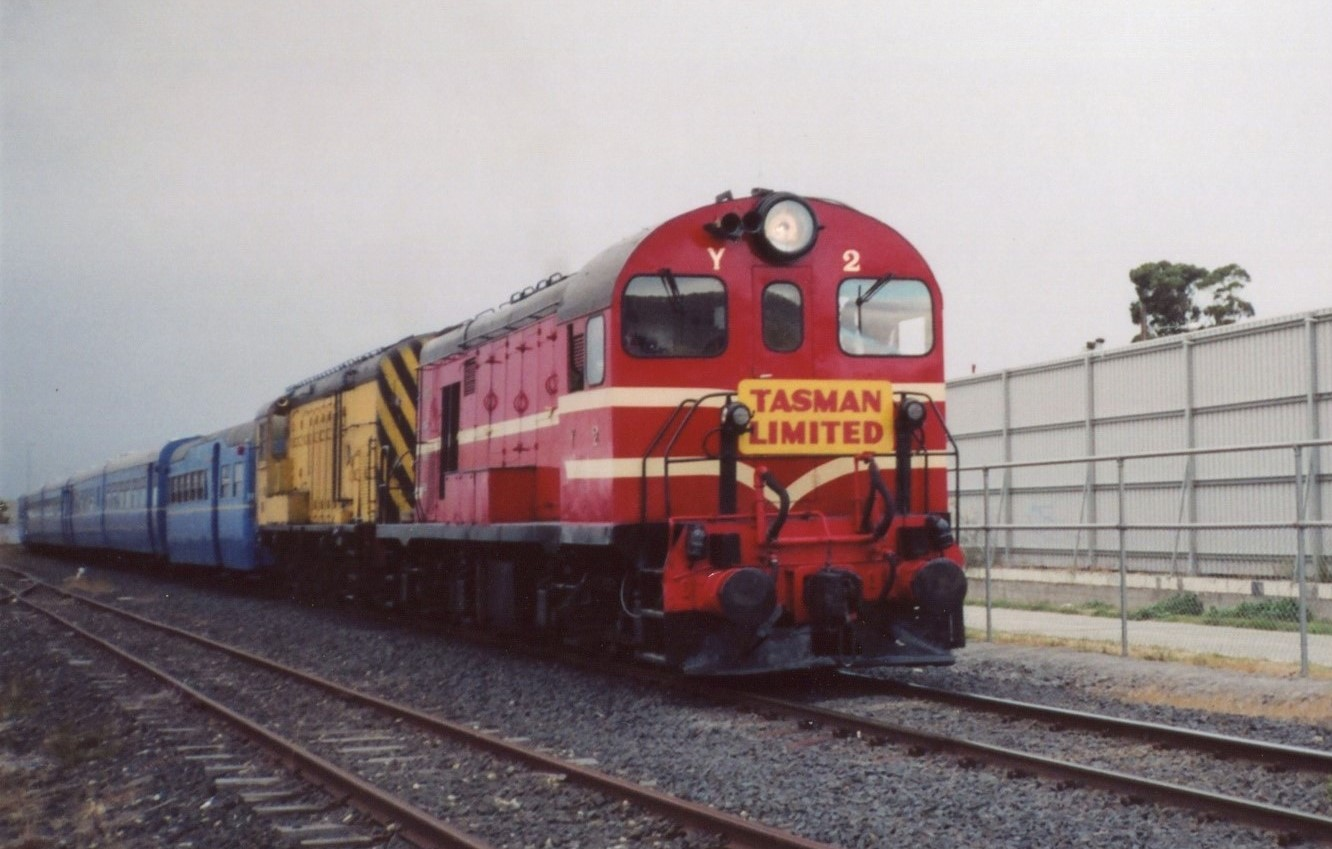
A Derwent Valley Railway excursion with 'Tasman Limited' headboard attached to locomotive Y2, 2001

Some Tasman Limited headboards survive and are on display at the Don River Railway, Tasmanian Transport Museum, Queen Victoria Museum and Art Gallery, and Bellarine Peninsula Railway in Victoria. In July 2018 the Don River Railway commemorated 40 years since the withdrawal of the service by placing a Tasman Limited headboard on the front of its regular service train, hauled by diesel locomotive Y6.

== See also ==
- Railway accidents in Tasmania
- TasRail
