= Moolap railway station =

Former railway station in Victoria

Moolap

General information
- Location: Moolap, Victoria; Australia
- Owner: VicTrack
- Line: Queenscliff railway line, Victoria

Other information
- Status: Closed

History
- Opened: 1 August 1881
- Closed: 10 March 1936

Moolap railway station is a closed railway station on the Queenscliff railway line. It was opened on 1 August 1881 and closed on 10 March 1936. It served the workers at the salt works. On 1 January 1923 it became a request stop as traffic dropped exponentially after World War I and buses and trams became a faster way of travel.
