= Lake Lorne =

Lake in Victoria, Australia

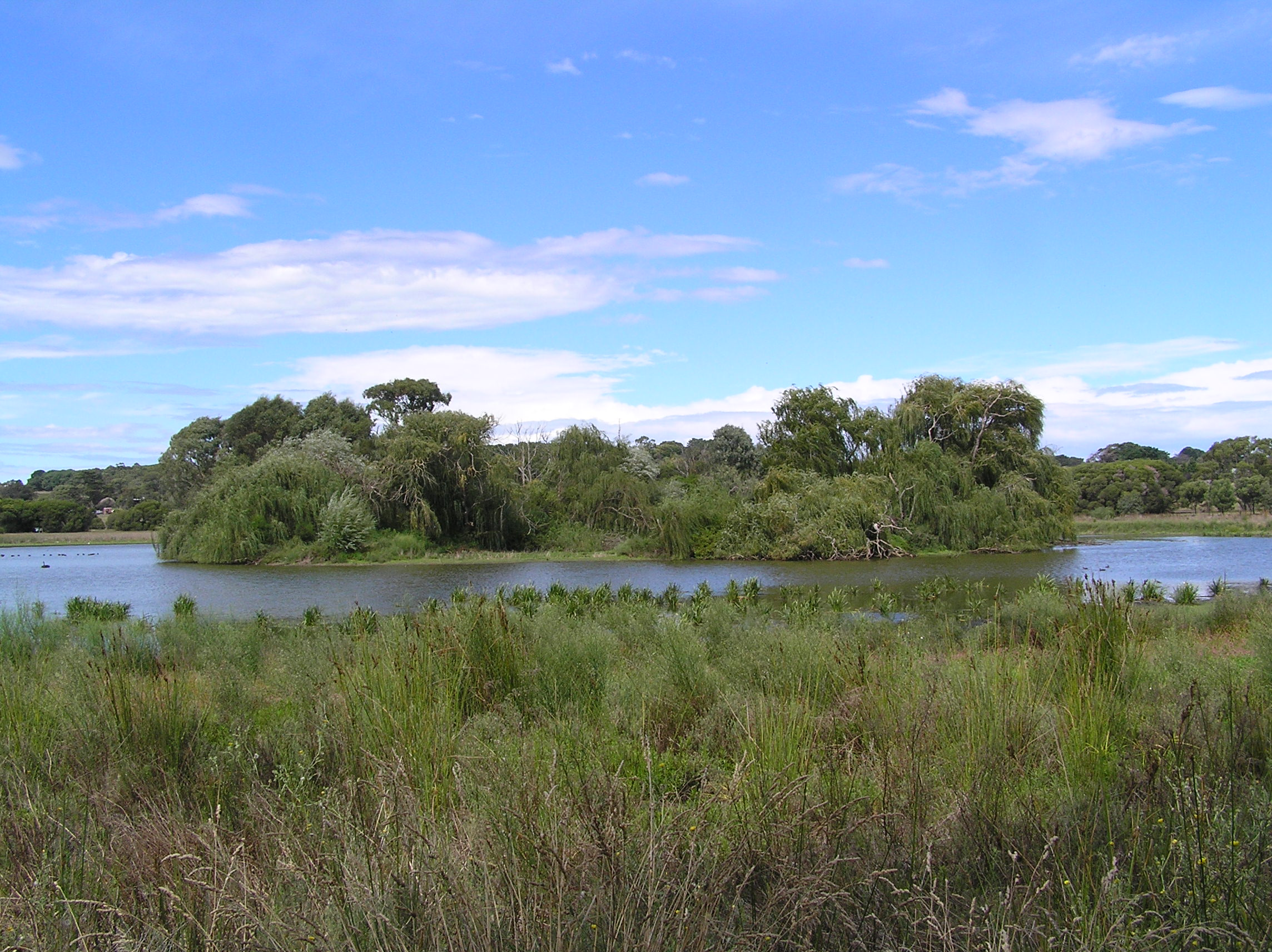

- Location in Victoria
- Location: Bellarine Peninsula, Victoria
- Coordinates: 38°10′55″S 144°33′29″E
- Type: Freshwater
- Basin countries: Australia
- Surface area: 12 ha (30 acres)
- Surface elevation: 62 m (203 ft)

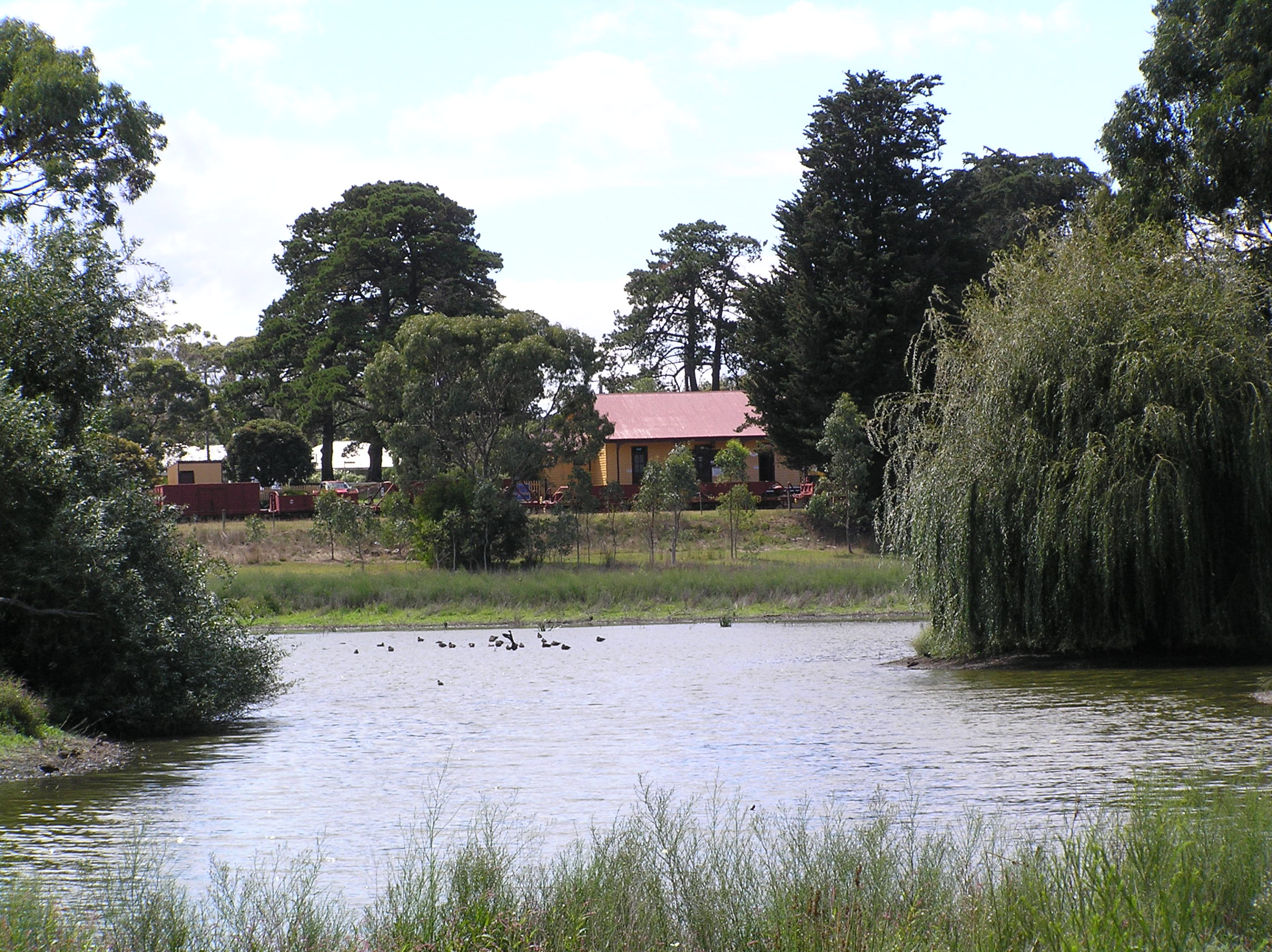
View across lake to Drysdale Railway Station.

Lake Lorne, a small 12-hectare (30-acre) freshwater lake on the Bellarine Peninsula, Victoria, Australia, is located immediately south-west of the township of Drysdale.

== Location and features ==
The lake is a popular birdwatching site and is well known for its variety of waterbirds, many of which have been recorded as breeding there. Lake Lorne lies in a depression in the underlying limestone and has no surface outlet. Water levels may vary substantially, often with a lag time in response to rainfall, with the nearby McLeods Waterholes being part of the same hydrological system. It contains a central complex of three islets densely vegetated with willows, eucalypts, paperbarks and pittosporums. The lake is largely surrounded by parkland and is close to the Drysdale railway station.

== Birds ==
The lake is important for freckled and blue-billed ducks which are listed as threatened in Victoria. Waterbirds, waders and rails which have bred at the lake include black swans, hardheads, musk ducks, Australasian and hoary-headed grebes, darters, little pied and little black cormorants, dusky moorhens, purple swamphens, Eurasian coots and black-fronted dotterels. It is also a roosting site for hundreds of cormorants and ibises.
