= Tasmanian Government Railways V class =

Class of Australian diesel locomotives

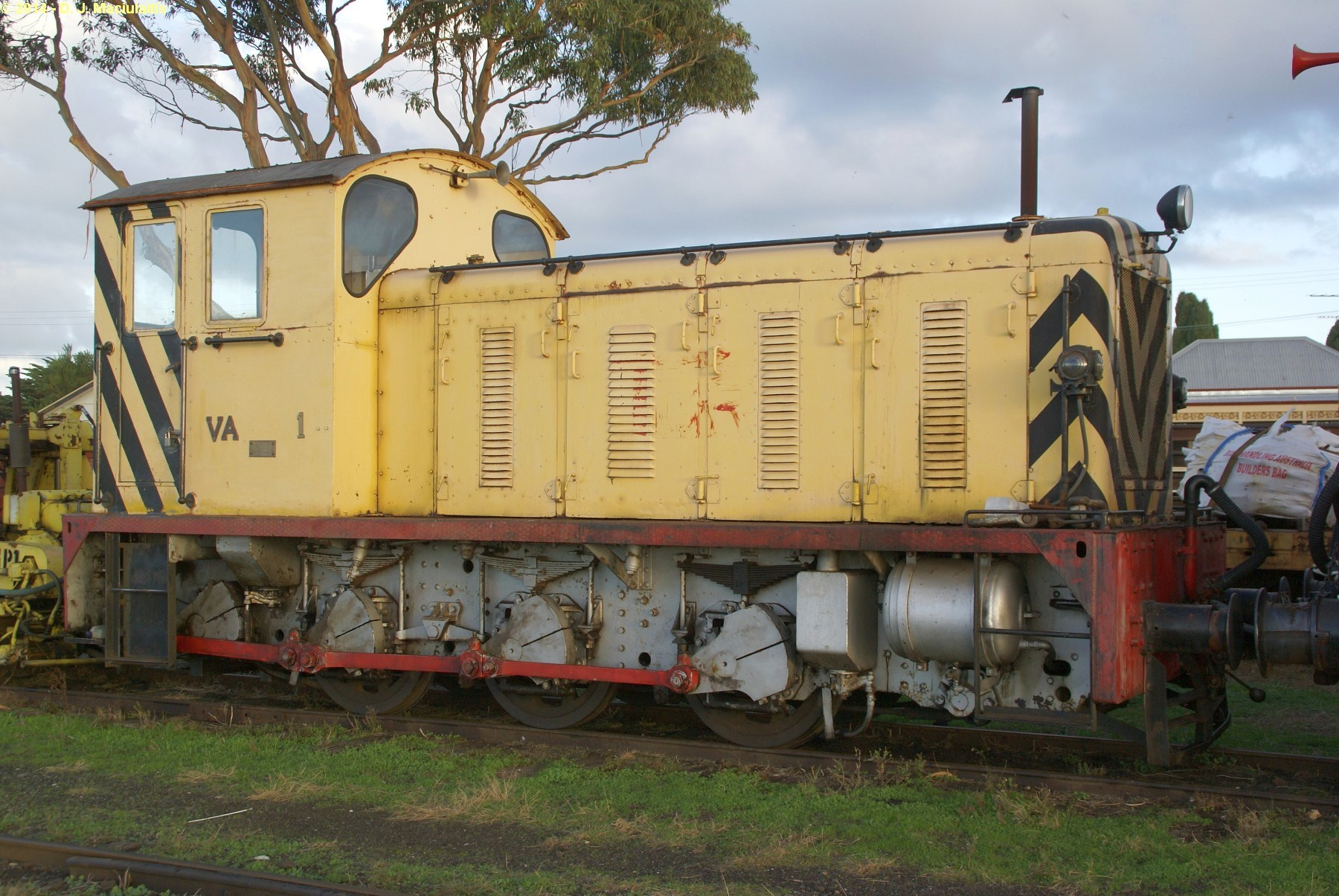
- VA1 on the Bellarine Railway in May 2014
Type and origin
- Power type: Diesel
- Builder: Vulcan Foundry; Tasmanian Government Railways
- Build date: 1948
Specifications
- Configuration
  - Whyte: 0-6-0
- Gauge: 1,067 mm (3 ft 6 in)
- Prime mover: Gardner 8L3
Career
- Operators: Tasmanian Government Railways; Emu Bay Railway
- Number in class: 14
- Numbers: TGR: V1-V13; Emu Bay: 22
- Disposition: 10 preserved, 4 scrapped

The Tasmanian Government Railways V class are a class of diesel locomotives operated by the Tasmanian Government Railways.

== History ==
The V class were the first diesel locomotives operated by the Tasmanian Government Railways (TGR) with four delivered in 1948. Built by the Vulcan Foundry to a design by the Drewry Car Company, they were similar to the standard gauge British Rail Class 04. In 1951 a further two were acquired, followed by another two in 1955. Between 1959 and 1968 the TGR built four more at its Launceston Railway Workshops.

Two identical locomotives were purchased by the Mount Lyell Mining & Railway Company in 1953. After closure in 1963, Mount Lyell 2405 was sold to the Emu Bay Railway as number 22, while 2406 went to the TGR as V13. All the TGR locos were withdrawn between 1983 and 1987, however Emu Bay 22 remained in service until 2000.

Two units were downgraded by the installation of a 6 cylinder 6L3 Gardner diesel (instead of the 8 cylinder) and a four speed epicyclic gearbox (instead of five speeds), and reclassified VA. Both V1 & V8 were thus converted, although VA8 was later converted back to standard configuration, with its 6 cylinder engine going to V3.

Ten have been preserved:

- VA1 by The Bellarine Railway, Victoria
- V2 by the Don River Railway
- V4 by the Hotham Valley Railway, Western Australia
- V5 by the Hotham Valley Railway, Western Australia
- V7 by the Derwent Valley Railway
- V8 by the Bellarine Railway, Victoria
- V9 by the West Coast Wilderness Railway
- V12 by the Puffing Billy Railway, Victoria, rebuilt to 760 mm gauge, converted to Westinghouse air braking and numbered D21
- V13 by the Zig Zag Railway, New South Wales, sold to the West Coast Wilderness Railway, renumbered D2 and fitted with a rack drive unit
- V22 by the West Coast Wilderness Railway, renumbered D1
