= Lakers Siding railway station =

Railway station in Victoria, Australia

Lakers Siding is a heritage railway station on the Bellarine Railway, Australia. It was built privately by the Laker family (from whom the siding's name is derived), and was used as a shell grit plant, opening on 16 November 1959.

== Shell grit dispatching ==
The dispatching of shell grit was Lakers Siding's main function. Approximately 1,000 tonnes of shell grit was produced at the plant there each week. The product was then transported to the Australian Glass Manufacturers' siding in Spotswood, Victoria, where elevated loading bins and platforms were used to unload it. One train departed each week.

The Laker family decided to cease the operation in 1973 and established an engineering business at the site instead. Consequently, the Australian Glass Manufacturers obtained shell grit from New South Wales instead.

Erosion

Sand erosion became a major problem at the site during the 1960s, with sand drifts clogging the point work and the signal cables. Special grass was planted in an attempt to stop the sand from moving onto the train tracks. Although the grass helped somewhat, erosion is still evident at the site and continues to be a problem today.

Closing and reopening

The siding remained available until the Queenscliff Line's closure in 1976. The Bellarine Peninsula Railway then took control and reopened the site as a tourist destination in 1979.

Maintaining the site

In addition to re-gauging the track, the Bellarine Railway replaced the staff lock points with plunger locks and provided up and down home signals.

A passenger platform was built in 2003 and features a replica of the original Victorian Railways portable building and a Marshalltown post office hut replica.

In 2007, a project commenced that included building an island platform, facilitating a new locomotive watering facility, and the construction of a 150-metre-long rolling stock shed with four tracks.
