= Bellarine Railway =

Tourist railway in Victoria, Australia

Coordinates: 38°15′42″S 144°39′35″E

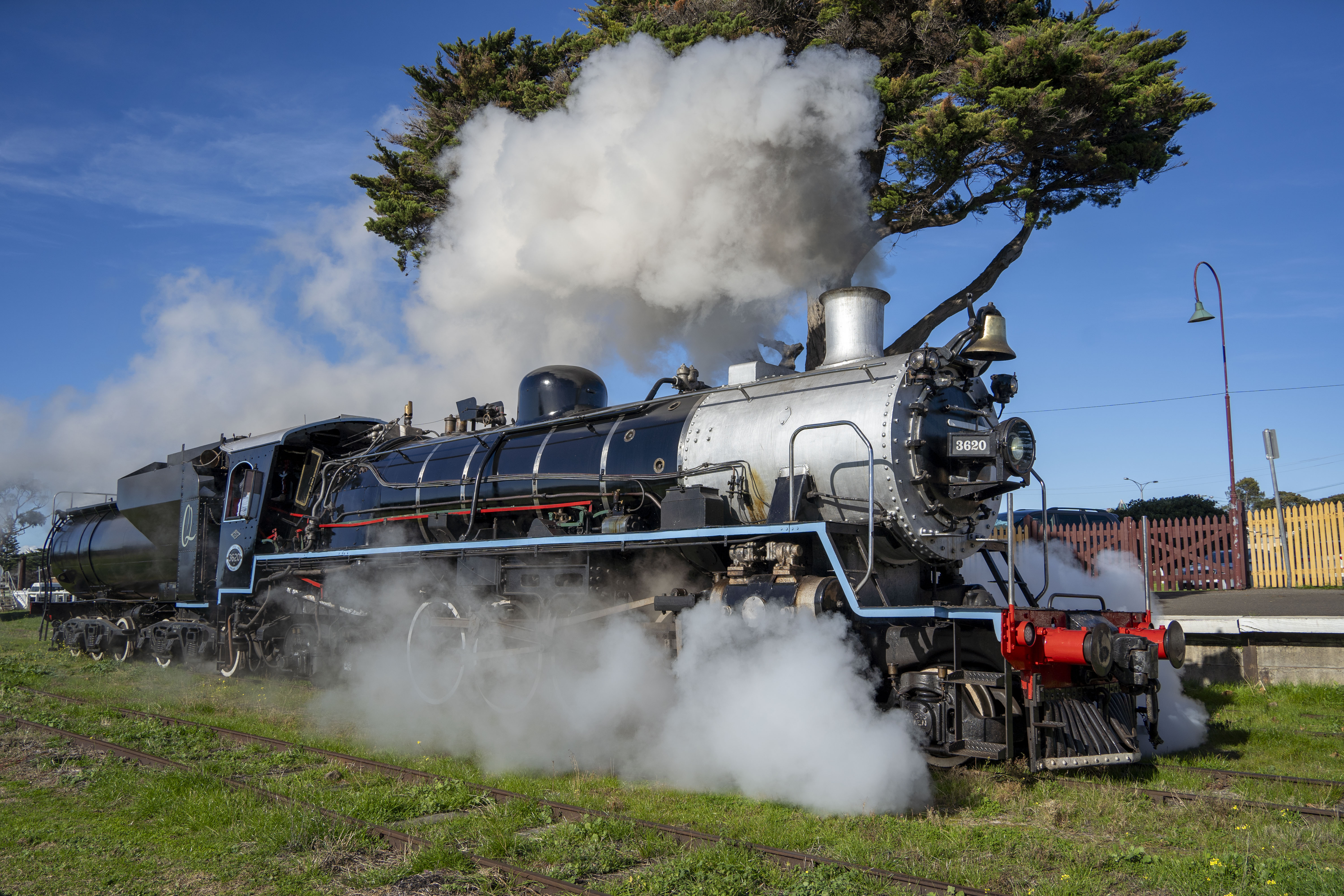
- Bellarine Railway No. 3620 at Queenscliff station, June 2024

Overview
- Status: Active
- Stations: Drysdale, Lakers Siding and Queenscliff
- Website: bellarinerailway.com.au

Service
- Type: Tourist

History
- Opened: 1879
- Closed: 1976
- Reopened: 1979

Technical
- Line length: 16 km (10 mi)
- Number of tracks: 1
- Track gauge: 1,067 mm (3 ft 6 in)

The Bellarine Railway, formerly the Bellarine Peninsula Railway, is a volunteer-operated steam-driven tourist railway located in Victoria, Australia. It operates on a 16 km (9.9 mi) section of a formerly disused branch line on the Bellarine Peninsula between the coastal town of Queenscliff and Drysdale, near Geelong.

== History as a working railway ==
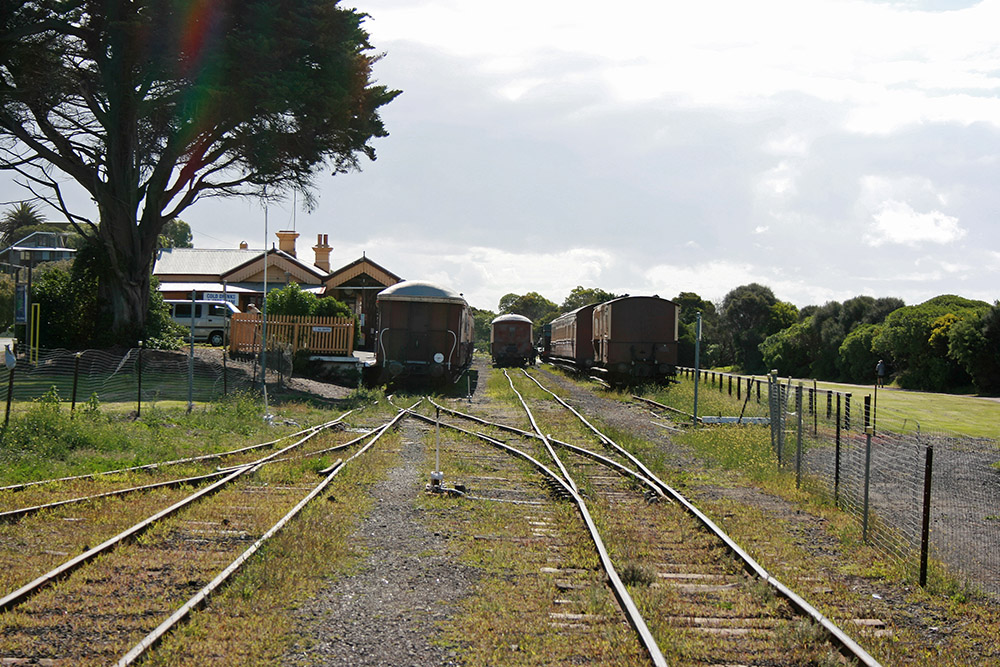
Looking west along the Bellarine Railway to Queenscliff station; at right is the Bellarine Rail Trail

The original line was commissioned in September 1878, and opened on 21 May 1879. It connected Queenscliff with South Geelong station, the terminus of the Geelong line, and the junction of the Warrnambool line. It was acknowledged at the time that although passenger traffic alone might not justify a railway line, military traffic from both the port and Fort Queenscliff—a key defence installation—would warrant its construction. It initially carried passenger, goods and military traffic, and continued to do so for several decades.

In the first few months of operation, it carried only one service per day, but at its peak, in January 1885, four trains per day ran in each direction, enabling the line to be used by commuters. However, this was decreased to three, and was cut back to two trains a day in 1910. Traffic on the line continued to fall over the next twenty years, and in 1931, passenger services were dropped completely—apart from the occasional Sunday excursion train. Freight services continued to run, although they were cut to back at first to twice-weekly, and then weekly operation.

The line saw a revival during World War II, carrying mines from the Swan Island military base, but returned to pre-war levels afterwards. After the war, services became less frequent, with goods services cut back to once a fortnight. The line was closed on 6 November 1976. The line is recognised as the oldest Victorian branch line still in operation.

== Preservation and re-opening as a tourist railway ==
In 1968, when the Queenscliff line was still officially open, the Fyansford Cement Works Railway near Geelong was closed. The cement company donated all its steam rolling stock to preservation groups, and the Geelong division of the Australian Railway Historical Society (ARHS), which was still in its infancy, received two engines. While Drysdale station was looked upon as a preferred site, this proved difficult to arrange, and a temporary site at the Belmont Common was used.

The Geelong division of the ARHS registered itself as the Geelong Steam Preservation Society in 1970 and it constructed and operated a small tourist railway, the Belmont Common Railway, on the Belmont Common. However, the site faced ongoing problems due to adjacent developments and its location on a flood plain, and by 1976, it was apparent that continuing on the Belmont Common site would not be feasible. When it became clear that Victorian Railways intended closing the Queenscliff line, the GSPS saw an opportunity, and after the line was closed permanently in 1976, it began shifting operations to Queenscliff railway station.

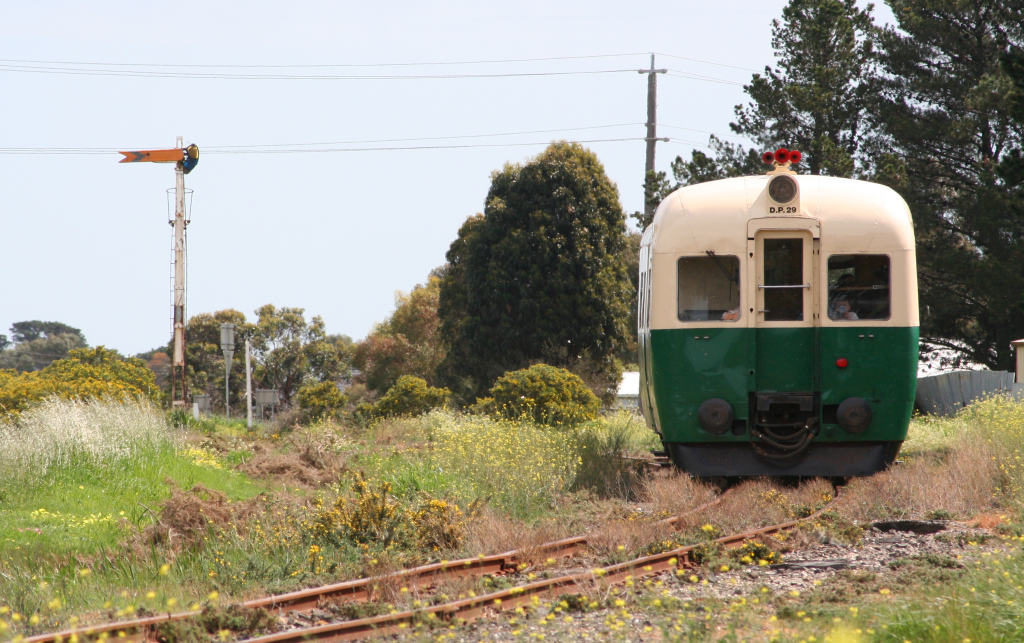
Tasmanian Government Railways DP class railcar approaching Drysdale station

During 1976 and 1977, the Society engaged in fundraising efforts and began regauging a short section of track around Queenscliff station, in order to enable its rolling stock to operate on the line. With the help of some government funding, it succeeded in operating its first services from Queenscliff to Laker's Siding in May 1979, and to Drysdale not long after.

== Current operations ==
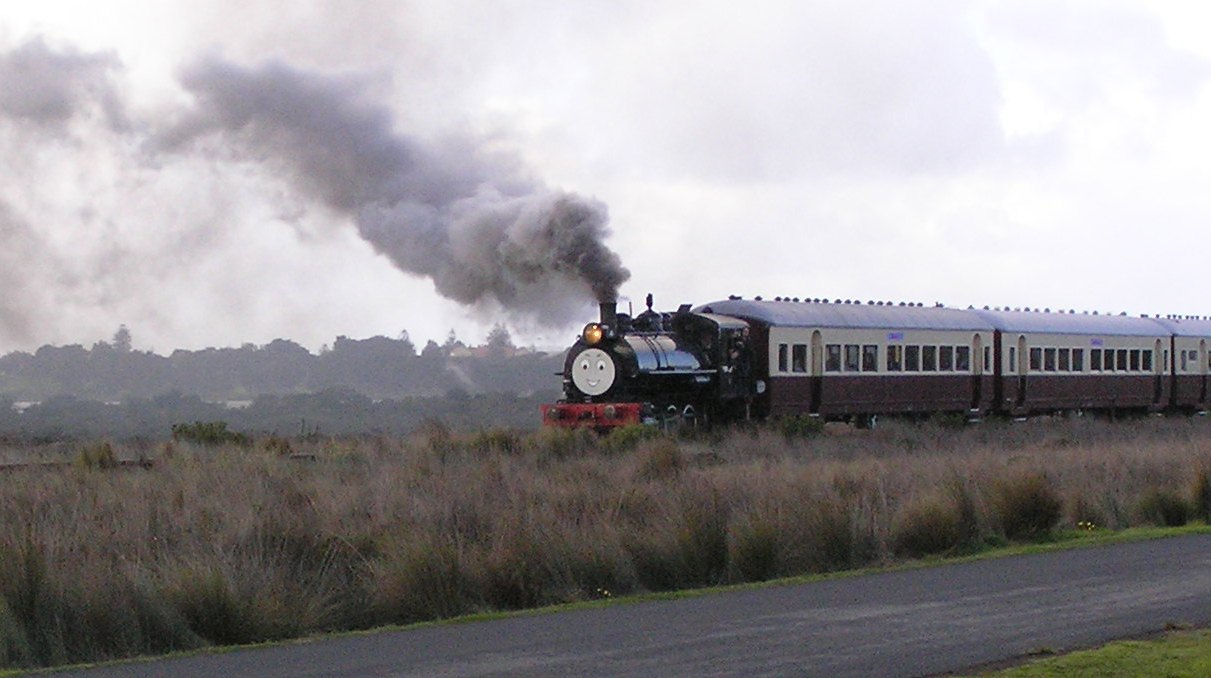
Fyansford Number 4 with "Thomas" face travelling westwards through Swan Bay saltmarsh

The railway currently operates two main Heritage Train services. The Swan Bay Express is a shorter trip between Queenscliff and Lakers Siding and return, running every Sunday as well as Tuesdays and Thursdays during the school holidays. The Seaside Explorer travels the full length of the line from Drysdale to Queenscliff and return, with dates for these trains announced on the railway's Facebook page and website.

During the winter period the railway also operates the Steamlight Night services, traveling from Queenscliff to Lakers Siding where passengers can disembark the train to roast marshmallows and enjoy the evening atmosphere.

Additionally, the railway operates licensed family events including the ever popular "Day Out With Thomas" weekends, and THE POLAR EXPRESS™ Train Ride.

The railway is also home to The Q Train - an award-winning gourmet restaurant train, alongside The Blues Train Live Music Experience.

The remainder of the line between Drysdale and South Geelong has fallen into disuse, and the GSPS has not attempted to extend its operations back to Leopold or South Geelong. The sections of the former route from Drysdale to South Geelong, along with a walking track adjacent to the Queenscliff-Drysdale line, now form the Bellarine Rail Trail, accessible to cyclists and walkers.

The railway features a working collection of locomotives from all four state government-run 1,067 mm (3 ft 6 in) gauge railway bodies in Australia; Tasmania, Western Australia, South Australia and Queensland; as well as from a number of Australian industrial railways. In late 2011, the railway negotiated to relocate the last remaining Australian Standard Garratt to the Bellarine Railway, from the Newport Railway Museum. The transportation of the locomotive took place on 31 May 2013, with the Bellarine Railway hoping to restore it to active service.

=== Locomotives ===
==== Steam locomotives ====
Image	Number	Type	Builder	Serial No.	Year built	Status	Notes
	6	0-4-2T	Hudswell Clarke, Leeds	646	1903	Under Restoration	Originally used as a shunter at the copper smelter in Wallaroo, South Australia. Later used by Australian Portland Cement (APC) on the Fyansford Cement Works Railway until 1966.
	454	PB15 (4-6-0)	Walkers, Maryborough, Queensland	99	1909	Out of service	Used by Queensland Rail until 1969. Hauled tourist trains at the Bellarine Railway until 2007. Stored, awaiting overhaul.
Steam locomotive No. 4 hauls a small tourist train down a straight portion of the railway	4	0-6-0ST	Vulcan Iron Works, Wilkes-Barre, Pennsylvania		1916	Stored	Used by APC on the Fyansford Cement Works Railway until 1966. Stored, awaiting overhaul.
	5	0-6-0ST	Vulcan Iron Works, Wilkes-Barre, Pennsylvania		1916	Stored dismantled	Used by APC on the Fyansford Cement Works Railway until 1966.
An old photo of T251 sitting idle	T251	SAR T (4-8-0)	Walkers, Maryborough, Queensland	276	1917	Operational	Used by South Australian Railways until 1970. Purchased by GSPS and was in traffic on the Bellarine Peninsula Railway until 1991, when it was withdrawn due to mechanical condition. Returned to service on 11 April 2009.
	Pozières	0-6-0T	Andrew Barclay Sons & Company, Kilmarnock	1543	1918	Operational	Previously used by Broken Hill Associated Smelters, Port Pirie. Was on display at the Puffing Billy Railway until June 2010, when it was relocated to the Bellarine Railway. Restored to steam in 2011.
	3620	South African Class 24 2-8-4	North British Locomotive Company, Glasgow	26332	1949	Operational	Owned by Ian Welch and leased to 'The Q Train', hauls The Q Train the first weekend of every month
	Klondyke	0-4-2T	Perry Engineering, Adelaide	271	1927	Operational	In use at Pioneer Sugar Mill in Ayr, Queensland until 1966. Dressed up as Thomas the Tank Engine during the railway's Day Out With Thomas events.
	S547	WAGR S (4-8-2)	Midland Railway Workshops, Perth		1947	Stored Dismantled	Used by Western Australian Government Railways until 1971. Acquired by Bellarine Railway in 1980 for possible eventual restoration.
	M6	TGR M (4-6-2)	Robert Stephenson & Hawthorns	7429	1951	Stored Dismantled	Used by Tasmanian Government Railways until 1971. Hauled tourist trains at the Bellarine Railway until mid-2000s. Stored, awaiting overhaul.
	V1209	WAGR V (2-8-2)	Robert Stephenson & Hawthorns	7778	1955	Stored	Used by Western Australian Government Railways until 1971. Brought to Victoria in 1982 by the Bellarine Railway and restored to traffic. Used for display as Henry the Green Engine during Day Out With Thomas events.
	11	0-4-0T	Perry Engineering, Adelaide	267	1926	Stored	Originally used by the State Rivers and Water Supply Commission of Victoria in construction of the Hume Weir. Later used by APC on the Fyansford Cement Works Railway until 1966. Was on display at the Puffing Billy Railway's museum at Menzies Creek until June 2010, when it was relocated to the Bellarine Railway for eventual restoration.
	2	2-6-0+0-6-2	Beyer, Peacock & Company, Manchester	6935	1938	Stored	Garratt locomotive used by APC on the Fyansford Cement Works Railway until 1966. Was on display at the Puffing Billy Railway's museum at Menzies Creek for some time before relocation to the Bellarine Railway for eventual restoration.
G33 sits on display at the Newport railway museum prior to being relocated to the Bellarine Railway	G33	4-8-2+2-8-4	Newport Workshops		1945	Under Restoration	Last remaining Australian Standard Garratt, used by APC on the Fyansford Cement Works Railway until 1966. Relocated from Newport Railway Museum in May 2013, under restoration

==== Diesel locomotives ====
Image	Number	Type	Builder	Serial No.	Year built	Status	Notes
A green 0-6-0 diesel locomotive 'V8' sits on a track just outside of the workshops in queenscliff	V8	0-6-0D	Drewry Car Company	2537	1955	Stored	Operated used by AN Tasrail until 1987
	VA1	0-6-0D	Drewry Car Company	2227	1947	Under Restoration	Operated used by AN Tasrail until 1987
X20 leading a train with X3, in its old blue paint scheme.	X20		English Electric	1820	1950	Operational	Operated used by AN Tasrail until 1987
	X3		English Electric	1798	1950	Operational	Operated by AN Tasrail until 1985
	1604	RSE92C	English Electric	A.059	1962	Operational	Operated by Queensland Rail until 1991.
1107 sitting at the Bellarine Railway	1107	EBR 11 class	Walkers Limited	644	1971	Operational	Hauls the Q train on non-steam operation
	Z1	TGR Z class	English Electric	A.249	1973	Operational	Hauls the Q train on non-steam operation
	Z4	TGR Z class	English Electric	A.252	1973	Operational	Hauls the Q train on non-steam operation

=== Railcars ===
Image	Number	Type	Builder	Year built	Status	Notes
	DP28		Drewry Car Company	1948	Out of service	Formerly used by AN Tasrail until 1978
	DP29		Drewry Car Company	1948	Out of service	Formerly used by AN Tasrail until 1978

=== Restored passenger carriages ===
Image	Number	Type	Builder	Year built	Withdrawn	Notes
	ZA200	Composite brakevan	Midland Railway of Western Australia	1912	1970 (Western Australian Government Railways)	Formerly numbered ZA 9348.
	AAR4	A saloon/buffet carriage with a kitchen and a bar	Clyde Engineering	1937	1978 (AN Tasrail)	
	BBL10	A saloon carriage	Clyde Engineering	1937	1978 (AN Tasrail)	
	AAR1	A saloon carriage	Clyde Engineering	1937	1978 (AN Tasrail)	
	MMV1333	Operated as a mail brake van	Queensland Railways	1944	1988 (Queensland Rail)	Used as a dance car on the Blues Train.
	DAV1056	Sleeping/sitting brake van for train crew	Queensland Rail	1924	1989 (Queensland Rail)	Formerly DAS1056, was operational as an open-section sleeping car, converted in 1979
	BUV1299	Evans suburban car (formerly a composite brakevan)	Queensland Rail	Unk.	Unk. (Queensland Rail)	
	BU465	Evans suburban car	Queensland Rail	Unk.	Unk. (Queensland Rail)	
	BBL6	Dog box passenger sitting car	Parsons and Gilmour	1922	1972 (Tasmanian Government Railways)	Formerly ABL15, renumbered and converted into BBL6 in November 1929.
	ABL14	Dog box passenger sitting car	Parsons and Gilmour	1922	1977 (Tasmanian Government Railways)	
	DB46	Composite class brakevan	Tasmanian Government Railways	1949	1987 (AN Tasrail)	

== Gallery ==
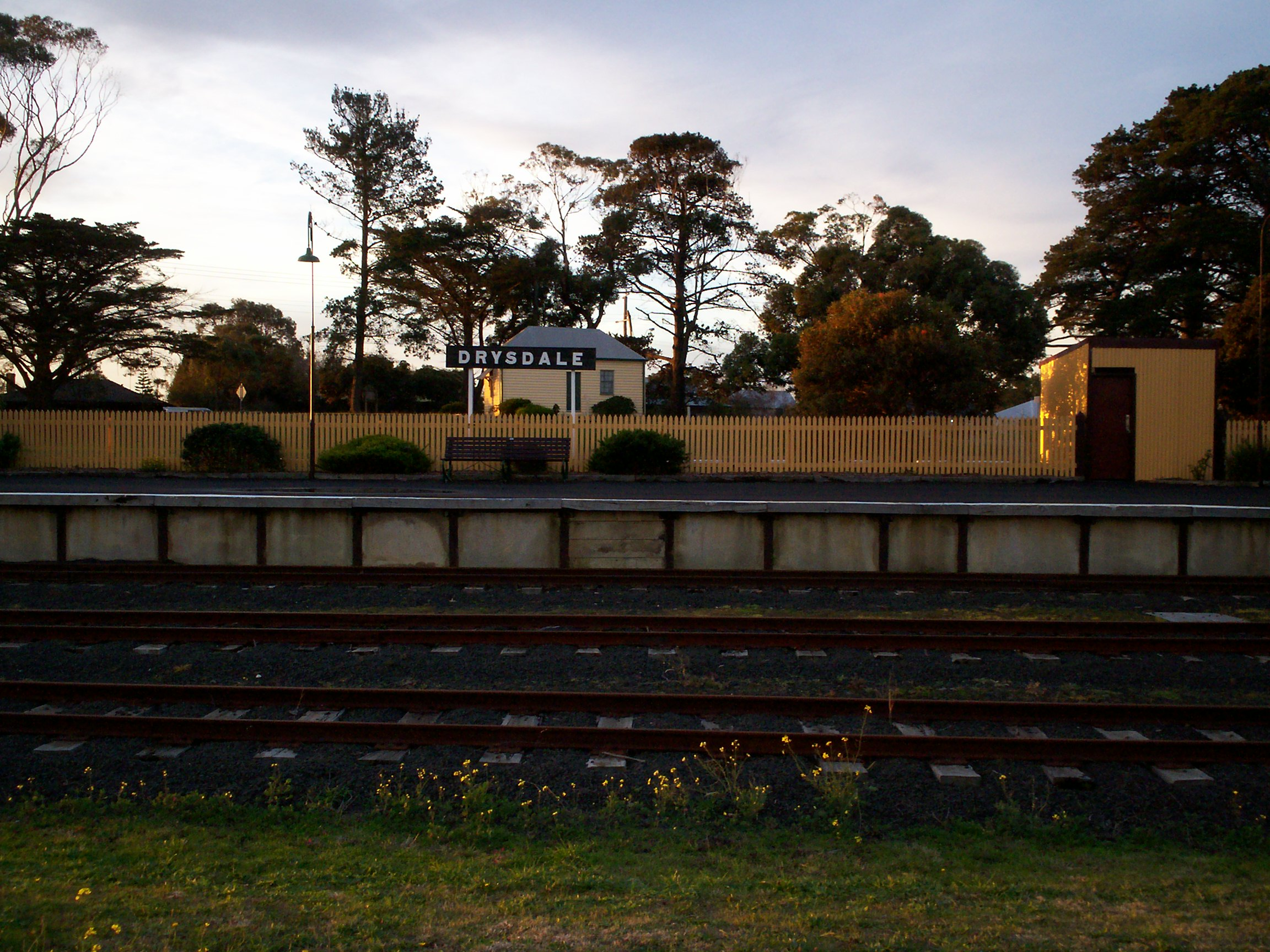
Drysdale station

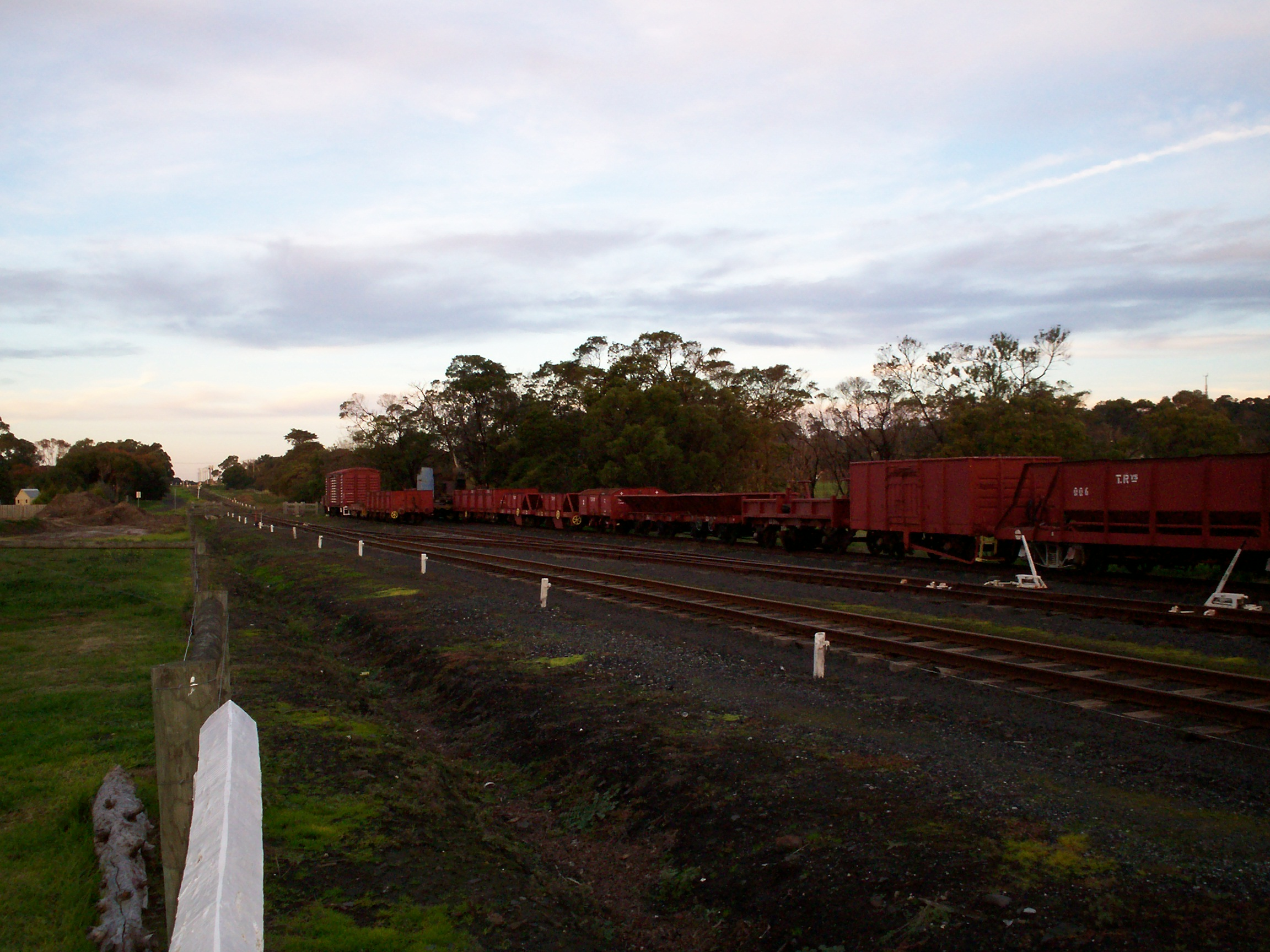
Goods Wagons at Drysdale station

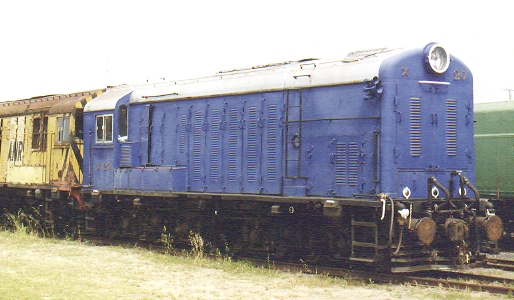
Tasmanian Government Railways X class diesel electric locomotive as used in Tasmania, the first mainline diesel-electric locomotive purchased by an Australian government railway system

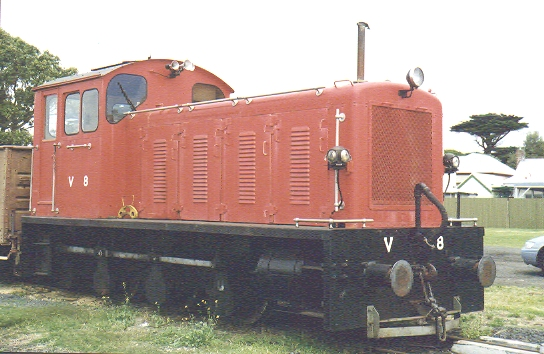
V class diesel shunting locomotive as used in Tasmania

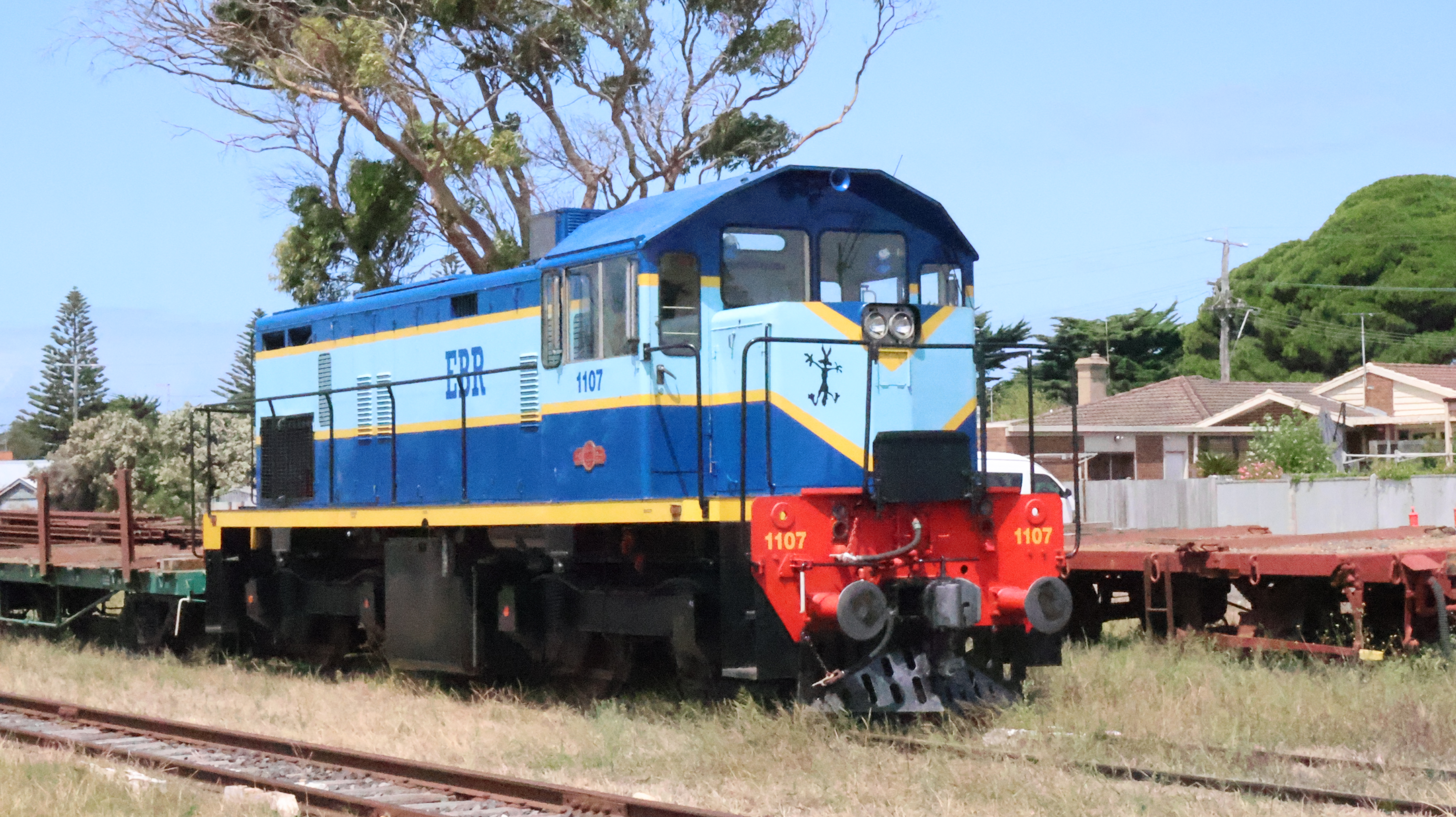
1107 parked just outside Queenscliff Station

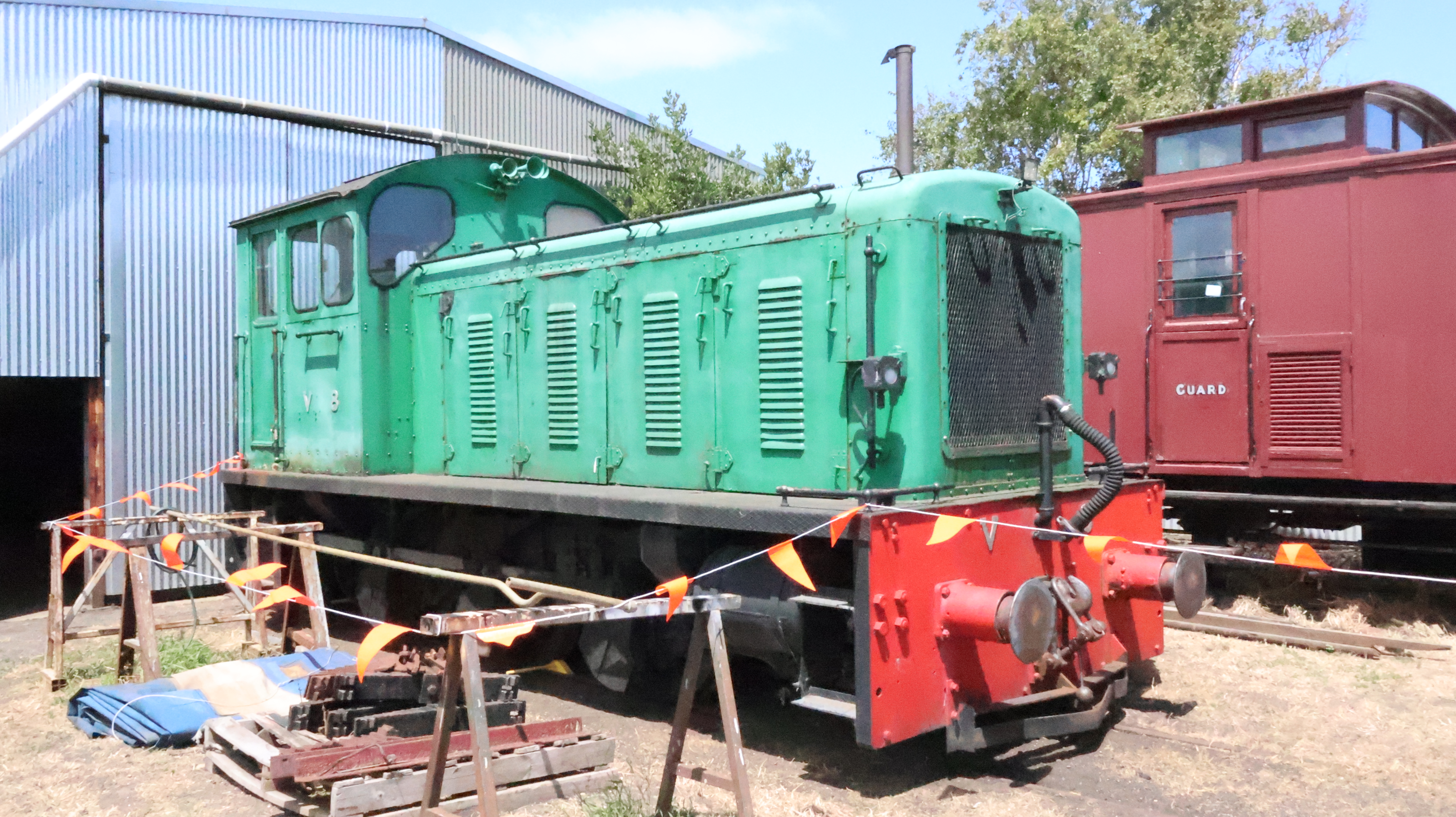
V8 parked outside of the Queenscliff Workshops

ex-TGR X20 at Lakers Siding Station. Note front panel featuring wasp stripes from the TGR's yellow livery (sourced from X8)
