= Bellarine Rail Trail =

Rail trail in Victoria, Australia

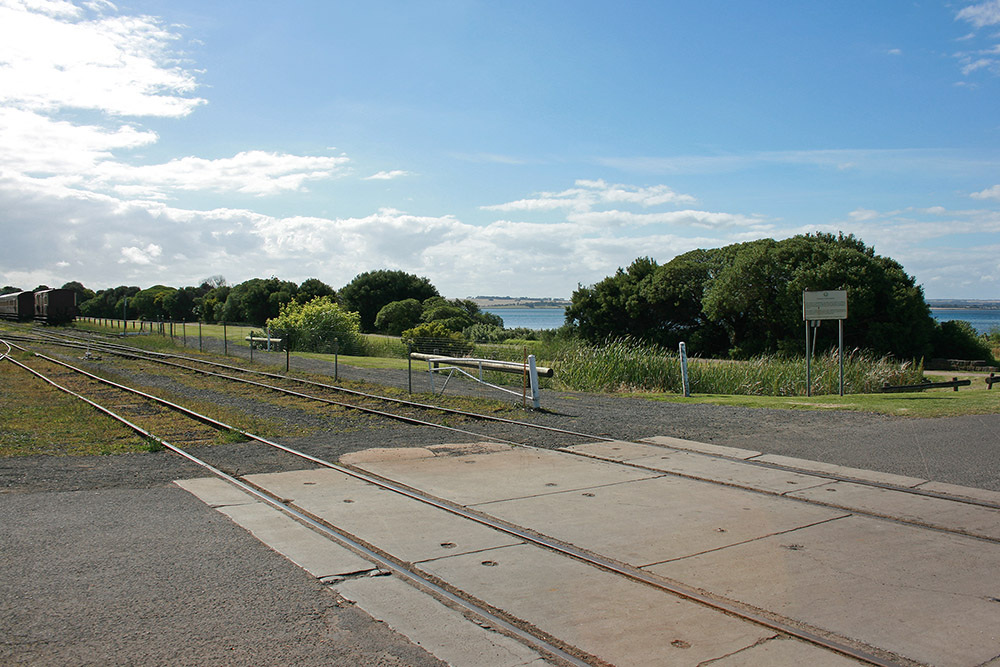
The start/finish of the Bellarine Rail Trail in Queenscliff

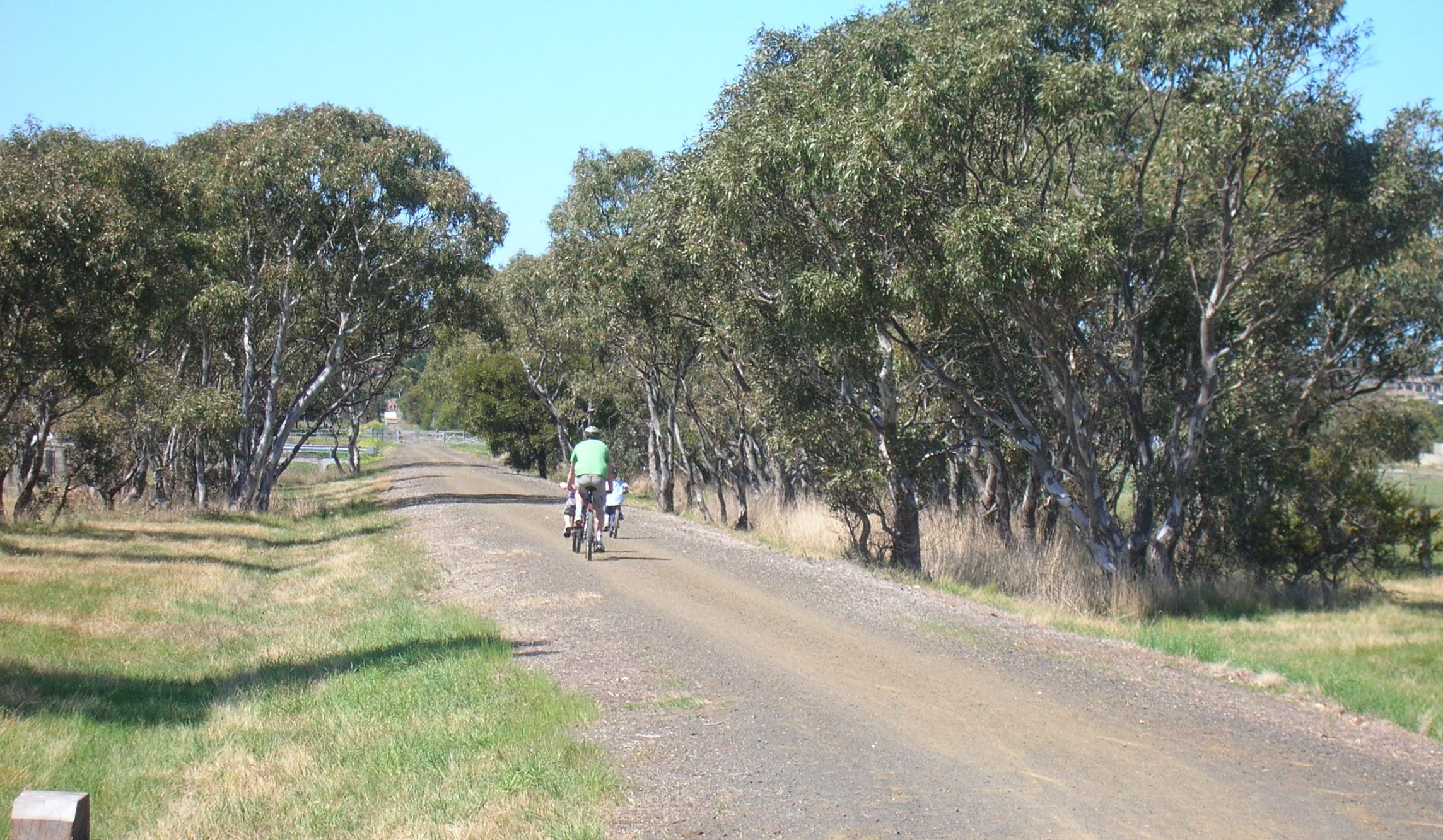
The Bellarine Rail Trial as it approaches Leopold from the west.

The Bellarine Rail Trail is a 35 km walking and cycling track on the Bellarine Peninsula, in Victoria, Australia, that follows the route of the former South Geelong to Queenscliff branch line. It runs from South Geelong to Queenscliff, passing through the towns of Leopold, Curlewis and Drysdale. The rails have been removed from the western section between South Geelong and Drysdale.

Sections of the rail trail between South Geelong Station and the Bellarine Highway, and Melaluka Rd, through Leopold and Curlewis to Drysdale are sealed.

The Bellarine Railway operates a tourist railway between Drysdale and Queenscliff, and the walking track runs parallel to the railway in this 16 km eastern section. The route traverses farmland with scattered patches and strips of native vegetation, mainly eucalypt woodland.

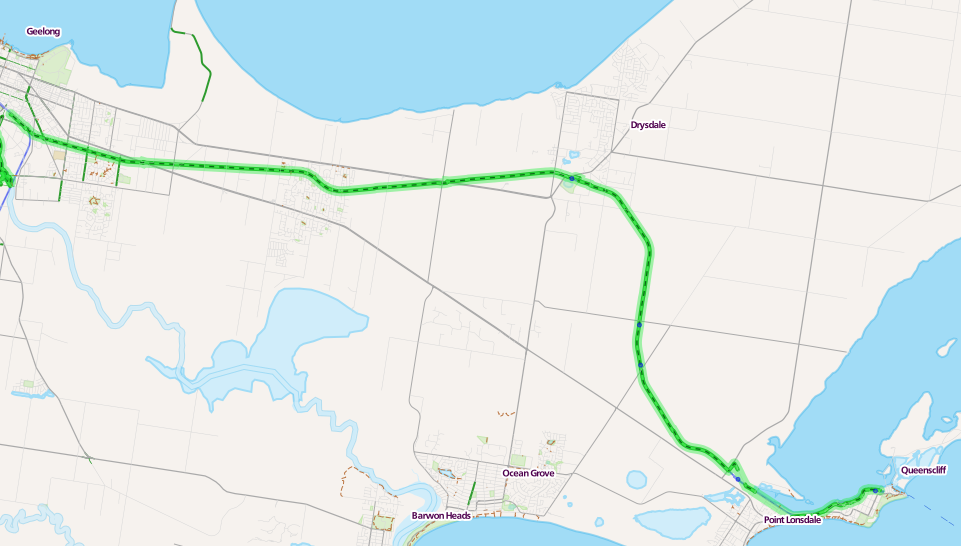
Map of the Bellarine Rail Trail.

== See also ==
- Queenscliffe Visitor Information Centre
- Cycling in Geelong
- Ted Wilson trail
