= The West Coaster (Tasmanian train) =

Former passenger rail service in Tasmania

Overview
- Service type: Passenger train
- First service: 17 October 1960
- Last service: 2 January 1964
- Former operator(s): Emu Bay Railway

Route
- Termini: Burnie; Rosebery
- Line(s) used: Melba

The West Coaster was a passenger train operated by the Emu Bay Railway between Burnie and Rosebery from October 1960 until January 1964.

== History ==
With the November 1959 introduction of the roll-on/roll-off ship Princess of Tasmania on the Bass Strait service from Melbourne to Devonport, Western Tasmania began to experience an increased level of tourism. At that stage there was no road south of Guildford.

Enquiries about transporting road vehicles led to the Emu Bay Railway deciding to replace its railmotor service with a locomotive hauled service with flat wagons to carry road vehicles. The first West Coaster ran on 17 October 1960. Pioneer Tours coaches were frequently carried.

The service departed Burnie in the morning, stopping at Guildford to load the road vehicles before continuing to Rosebery returning north in the afternoon. With the opening of the Murchison Highway in December 1963, the West Coaster last ran on 2 January 1964. Passengers continued to be carried on mixed trains until 1977.

== Rolling stock ==
To operate the service, two Dübs & Company built 4-8-0 steam locomotives were restored to service and named Murchison and Heemskirk and, along with three former Tasmanian Government Railways carriages, repainted in the company’s two-tone blue livery. To carry road vehicles, flat wagons were attached. On occasions, Australian Standard Garratt and 10 class diesel-hydraulic locomotives were used.
