= Wee Georgie Wood Railway =

Railway line in Tasmania, Australia

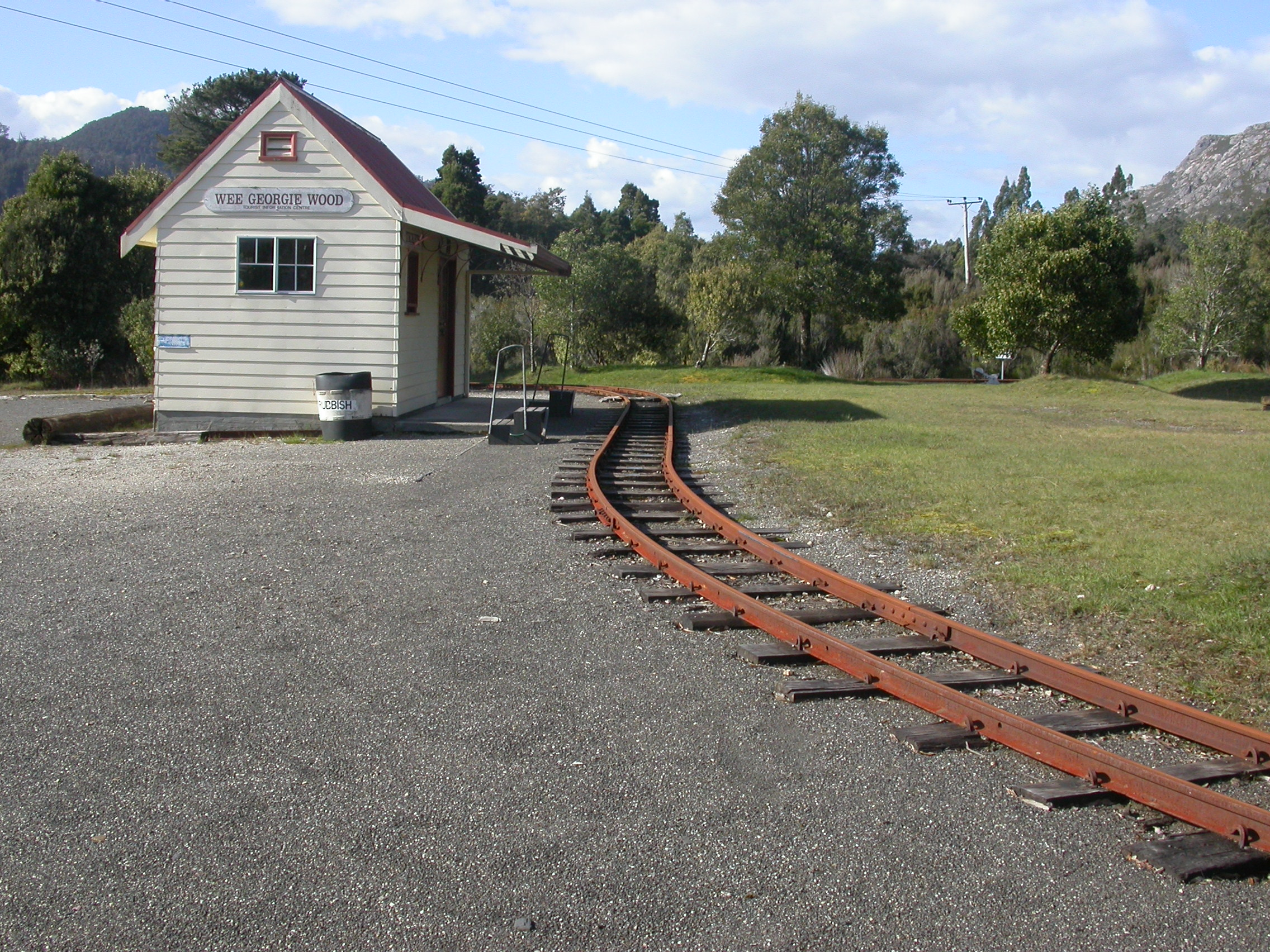
- Station in Tullah, Tasmania

Overview
- Locale: West Coast Municipality of Tasmania
- Coordinates: 41.72987°S 145.62417°E

Technical
- Line length: 1.9 km (1.2 mi)
- Track gauge: 2 ft (610 mm)

The Wee Georgie Wood Railway is a 2 ft (610 mm) narrow gauge tourist tramway running from Tullah, on a 1.9 km (1.2 miles) short track by the edge of Lake Rosebery in the West Coast Municipality of Tasmania.

== Location ==
The originally 10 km (6.2 miles) long narrow gauge railway connected the North Mount Farrell mine and its associated township at Tullah with the 3 ft 6 in (1,067 mm) gauge Emu Bay Railway. It is close to the Pieman River hydro-electric scheme, Lake Rosebery, Lake Mackintosh, and Lake Murchison. Some sections of the old track have been flooded, after the hydro-electric dams had been built. East of the Murchison Highway, the remaining 600m of railway to the mines was repurposed into part of the Mackintosh Dam Road.

== Name ==
The original name varied between being known as the North Mount Farrell Tramway, Farrell Tramway or Tullah Tram. Today's 1.9 km (1.2 miles) long tourist railway is named after its narrow gauge steam engine, which was due to its small size named after the British actor and comedian Wee Georgie Wood, who was only 4 ft 9 in (1.45 m) when fully grown.

== History ==
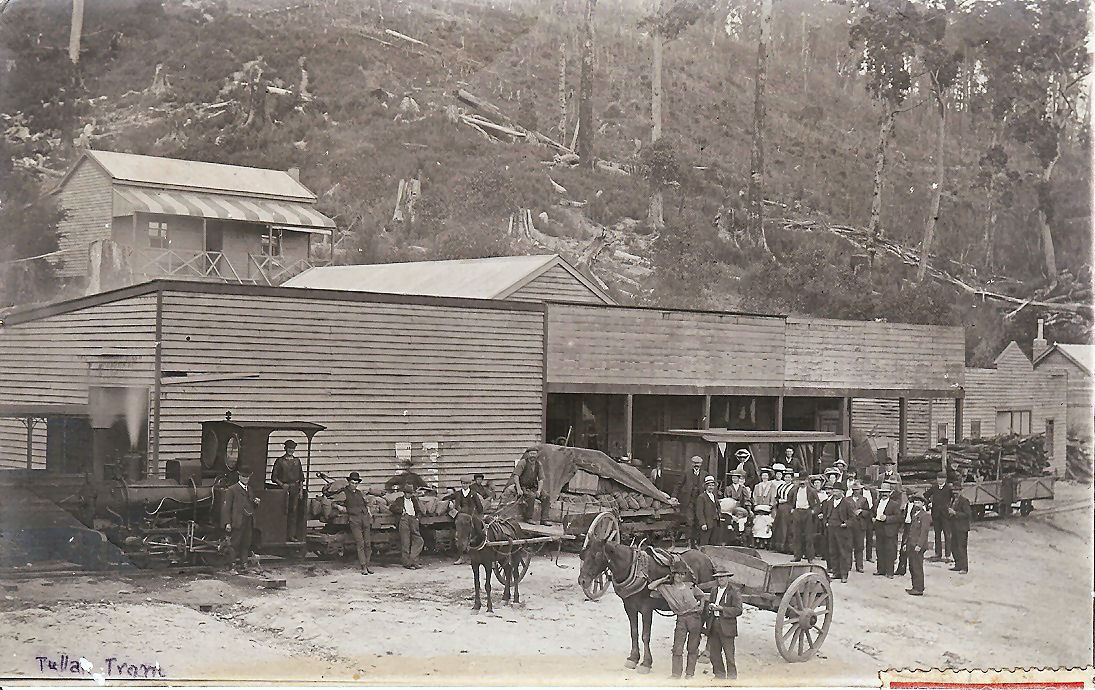
North Mount Farell Tramway

Galena, the most important lead ore mineral and a frequent source of silver, was discovered in the district of Tullah in 1892. Getting the ore to market was very difficult: The North Mount Farrell mine first shipped out ore by pack horse in 1899, because there was no road or track to Tullah, until the Murchison Highway was opened in 1962.

A tramway was proposed in northerly direction to Boco Siding on the Emu Bay Railway, over a distance of 8 miles (13 km). Originally planned to be laid with iron rails, it was eventually opened as a horse tram in 1902 with timber rails. The tramway could handle the transportation of the ore at reasonable cost, but as output from the mine increased, was unable to handle the traffic. A shorter route to the railway was surveyed, running on the north side of the Pieman River. The steel-railed steam tramway line was constructed by Dunkley Brothers, who were well known in Tasmania for their activities in the timber industry and was taken in service in 1909. It met the Emu Bay Railway at Farrell Siding, which was located on a continuous 1:40 grade as that railway dropped down to the Pieman River bridge. Therefore, complicated transhipment facilities needed to be erected.

The mine closed in 1932 due to the raw metal price drop during the worldwide economic crisis, but it re-opened in 1934, when a new presence of galena was found not far away. Immediately after the Murchison Highway was officially opened in 1962 the tramline between Tullah and Farrell Siding was not used anymore, but the steam locomotive Wee Georgie Wood was still used until late 1964 for the 0.5 miles (800 m) section between the mine and the flotation plant.

In 1977 the Wee Georgie Wood Steam Railway Inc was formed with the objective of overhauling Wee Georgie to working condition and later to use it for hauling tourist trains. Volunteers and generous local and coastal businesses put Wee Georgie was back in steam, rebuilt 1.9 km (1.2 mi) of narrow gauge track and restored a passenger carriage, which had previously been used on the Lake Margaret Tramway. On 5 February 1987, The Hon. Premier of Tasmania Robin Gray officially opened Wee Georgie Wood Steam Railway Inc. to the public.

In the centenary of the railway in 2002, celebrations and publications increased knowledge of the locomotives and their history.

== Locomotives ==
The railway originally had 3 locomotives, Wee Georgie Wood, Wee Mary and a Krauss engine named Puppy. Wee Mary was never restored and its chassis is currently in the Ida Bay/Lune River area. Prior to working in Tullah, Puppy worked in the Duck River region of the state and was eventually bought by the North Mt Farrell Co. The name "Puppy" was given due to its high pitched whistle, but it was originally Krauss number 2640 of 1892. The engine was eventually sold to Ida Bay in the 1930s where it still is today. The best known locomotive, Wee Georgie Wood, has been salvaged and returned to operation, but as of 2010, it has been stripped down due to restoration work while the diesel engine "Alpha Romeo" works the short track in its place. The Wee Georgie Wood railway currently has the remains of another Krauss locomotive that worked in the Queenstown area, a few electric locomotives and a gang motor from the original line.

From the centenary booklet of 2002:

Manufacturer	Number	Name	Year of production	Axles
Krauss	No. 2640	Puppy	1892	0-4-0
Orenstein & Koppel	No. 719		approx. 1901	0-4-0
Fowler	No. 16203	Wee Georgie Wood	approx. 1924	0-4-0
Fowler	No. 17732	Wee Mary	approx. 1928	0-4-0
Krauss	No. 5988	Number 9	1908	0-4-0
Vintage Romeo (Diesel)	No. 770	Nicola	1925	4wPM

== See also ==
- Railways on the West Coast of Tasmania
