= Murchison =

Murchison may refer to:

== Geographical features ==
- Lake Murchison, Tasmania, Australia
- Mount Murchison (Tasmania), Australia
- Murchison bioregion, a bioregion in Western Australia
- Murchison Falls, Uganda
- Murchison Glacier, New Zealand
- Murchison Island, an island in Lake Nipigon, Ontario, Canada
- Murchison Promontory, Canada
- Murchison Range, Stauning Alps, Greenland
- Murchison River (disambiguation)
- Murchison Sound, Greenland

=== National parks ===
- Iytwelepenty / Davenport Ranges National Park in Australia
- Murchison Falls National Park in Uganda
- Murchison Mountains, Fiordland National Park, New Zealand

== Places ==
=== Australia ===
- Electoral district of Murchison-Eyre, a former state electorate of Western Australia
- Electoral division of Murchison, an electorate in the Tasmanian Legislative Council
- Murchison County, New South Wales
- Murchison, Victoria
- Murchison (Western Australia), a sub-region in the state
- Shire of Murchison, a local government area in Western Australia
  - Murchison Settlement, within the Shire

=== South Africa ===
- Murchison, KwaZulu-Natal
- Murchison, Limpopo

=== Other places ===
- Murchison, New Zealand
- Murchison, Texas, United States

== Science ==
- Murchison Award, awarded by the Royal Geographical Society
- The Murchison Fund, awarded by the Geological Society of London
- Murchison Medal, awarded by the Geological Society of London
- Murchison Radio-astronomy Observatory, a designated radio quiet zone in Western Australia.
- Murchison Widefield Array, a radio telescope in Western Australia

== Other uses ==
- Murchison (crater), a crater on the Moon
- Murchison Building in Wilmington, North Carolina
- Murchison Highway, a road in Tasmania
- Murchison letter, a political scandal in 1888 in U.S.
- Murchison meteorite, which fell in 1969 near Murchison, Victoria, Australia
- The Murchison Murders which occurred in the 1930s in the Murchison region of Western Australia
- HMAS Murchison (K442), a warship of the Royal Australian Navy
- In re Murchison, a 1955 U.S. Supreme Court case during the Warren Court

== People with the surname ==
- Alice Lynne Murchison, maiden name of Lindy Chamberlain-Creighton
- Carl Murchison (1887–1961), American psychologist
- Charles Murchison (politician) (1872–1952), British politician
- Charles Murchison (physician) (1830–1879), British physician
- Charlotte Murchison (1788–1869), Scottish geologist
- Christian Murchison (b. 1980), Singaporean racing driver
- Clint Murchison Jr. (1923–1987), Texas businessman
- Clint Murchison Sr. (1895–1969), Texas businessman
- Elizabeth Murchison, British-Australian geneticist
- Ira Murchison (1933–1994), American athlete
- Kenneth Murchison (1794–1854), British diplomat
- Kenneth MacKenzie Murchison (1872–1938), American architect
- Larrell Murchison (b. 1997), American football player
- Loren Murchison (1898–1979), American athlete
- Lucia Murchison (1900–1983), American social worker
- Roderick Murchison (1792–1871), Scottish geologist for whom most of the geographical features above are directly or indirectly named
- Sally Fletcher-Murchison (b. 1933), American-Hawaiian ceramicist
- Tim Murchison (1896–1962), American baseball player
- William Murchison, American political columnist

== See also ==
- Davenport Murchison Ranges bioregion
- Mount Murchison (disambiguation)
