= Anthony Power Development =

Coordinates: 41°53′S 145°36′E

The Anthony Power Development Scheme, part of the Pieman River power development scheme, was a proposed scheme for damming parts of the upper catchment of the Pieman River in Western Tasmania, Australia.

Proposed by the Hydro-Electric Commission of Tasmania, approved by the Tasmanian Government in 1983, and environmental management established in 1984, the scheme proposed the development of five dams across various rivers that drain the West Coast Range towards the Southern Ocean. However, as a result of political and legal opinion that, most notably, saw the overturning of the proposed Franklin Dam in South West Tasmania, only one of the dams proceeded, the Anthony Dam and adjacent Anthony Levee, both across the Anthony River that formed Lake Plimsoll and enabled the creation of the Tribute Power Station.

== Background and proposal ==
Hydroelectric development occurred soon after the development of the incandescent light globe and the Pelton wheel in the 1870s. Hydroelectric technologies were adopted in Australia, and Tasmania in particular, very soon after the technology was developed. The first driver of this was the electricity needs of remote mining operations that lacked access to coal. By the early 1880s, a hydro scheme was supplying electricity at a remote tin mining operation at Mount Bischoff. Other remote mining operations such as the Mount Lyell Mining and Railway Company copper mine in Queenstown, and the Pioneer Tin Mining Co. in eastern Tasmania, followed soon after.

Facilities expanded during the twentieth century through the damming of the Derwent-Nive, Gordon-Pedder, Pieman, Great Lake-South Esk, King-Yolande, and Mersey-Forth catchments for the large scale development of hydroelectricity flows.

The 1983 approval for the Anthony Power Development Scheme was for the construction of the Anthony Dam, the Julia Dam, the White Spur Dam, the Upper Newton Dam, and the Lower Newton Dam. The Langdon Dam was identified, the dam plinth had been cleared and work on the keyway was almost complete when finance to build the dam was withdrawn, the keyway and plinth were covered over with peat and remains there to this day. At the time of the Anthony development, the Pieman Scheme was winding down and the King Scheme was in its early stages of development, from 1983 to 1992.

The Anthony Power Development Scheme was developed in two parts; the first development consisted of three dams: the Henty Dam (1988), the White Spur Dam and the Newton Dam.

The second development utilised the 300-metre (980 ft) fall of the Anthony River to Lake Murchison and was completed in March 1994 and created Lake Plimsoll.

== See also ==
- Henty Gold Mine
- List of power stations in Tasmania
