= Pieman =

Pieman may refer to:

- Isabelle Pieman, born 1983, a Belgian figure skater.
- Pieman River, a river in Australia.
- Lake Pieman, a lake in Australia.
- Pie (children's game), also known as Pieman, Pieman.
- The Pieman, A bakery in Thornlands, Queensland, Australia

== See also ==
- Andy Smith (darts player), who uses the Pie Man sobriquet.
- Simple Simpson, that features the Pie Man character.
- "The Pi Man", a short story by Alfred Bester
