= Sophia River =

River in Tasmania, Australia

Sophia
- Location of the Sophia River mouth in Tasmania

Location
- Country: Australia
- State: Tasmania
- Region: West Coast

Physical characteristics
- Source: West Coast Range
  - location: below Sophia Peak
  - coordinates: 41°47′40″S 145°46′57″E
  - elevation: 408 m (1,339 ft)
- Mouth: Mackintosh River
  - location: Lake Mackintosh
  - coordinates: 41°45′31″S 145°40′9″E
  - elevation: 221 m (725 ft)
- Length: 20 km (12 mi)

Basin features
- River system: Pieman River catchment
- Reservoirs: Lake Mackintosh

The Sophia River, part of the Pieman River catchment, is a perennial river in the West Coast region of Tasmania, Australia.

== Course and features ==
The Sophie River rises below Sophie Peak, part of the West Coast Range within the Granite Tor Conservation Area. The river flows generally west by north and reaches its confluence with the Mackintosh River within Lake Mackintosh. The river descends 187 metres (614 ft) over its 20-kilometre (12 mi) course.

Lake Mackintosh and several adjoining reservoirs form part of the Pieman River Power Development scheme and some of the flow of the Sophie River supplies the Mackintosh Power Station for the generation of hydroelectricity. The Sophia Tunnel feeder from Murchison Dam has its outlet near Sophia River. The Sophia Adit, a small tunnel for maintaining the Sophia Tunnel, is located adjacent to the river.
