= WAGR M class (diesel) =

Class of 2+3 Australian B′B′ diesel-hydraulic locomotives

Western Australian Government Railways M/MA class
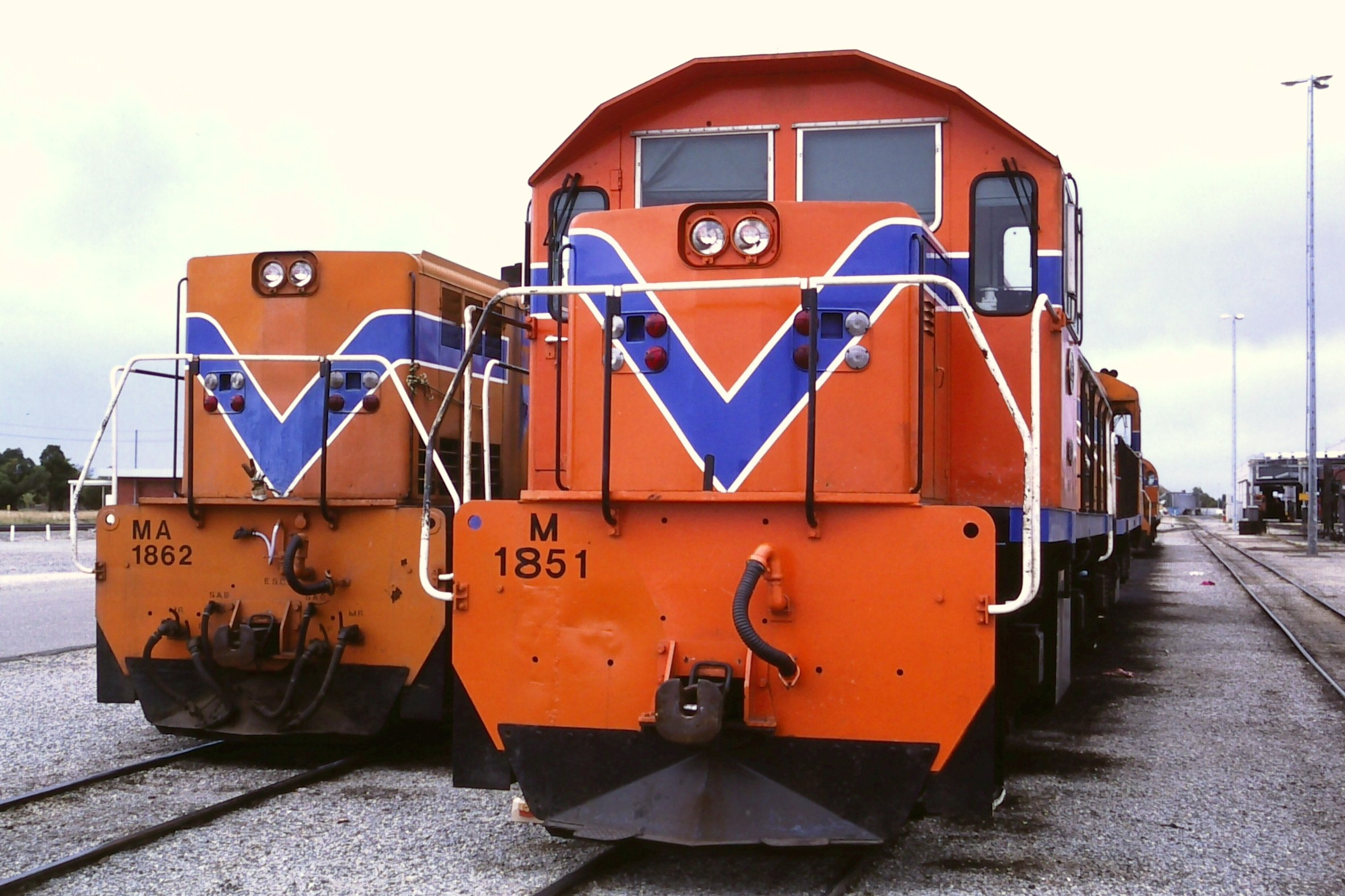
- MA1862 & M1851 at Forrestfield Marshalling Yard in March 1986
Type and origin
- Power type: Diesel-hydraulic
- Builder: Walkers Limited, Maryborough
- Model: GH500V
- Build date: 1972–1973
- Total produced: M: 2 MA: 3
Specifications
- Configuration
  - AAR: B-B
  - UIC: B'B'
- Gauge: 1,067 mm (3 ft 6 in)
- Loco weight: M: 53.8 tonnes (53.0 long tons; 59.3 short tons); MA: 44.7 tonnes (44.0 long tons; 49.3 short tons)
- Fuel type: Diesel
- Prime mover: M: Cummins VTA 1710L; MA: Caterpillar D379B
- Transmission: Voith L4R4U2
- MU working: M: none MA: within class.
Performance figures
- Maximum speed: 45 mph (72 km/h)
- Power output: M: 450 kW (600 hp); MA: 520 kW (700 hp)
- Tractive effort: 109 kN (25,000 lbf)
Career
- Operators: Western Australian Government Railways
- Number in class: M: 2 MA: 3
- Numbers: M1851–M1852; MA1861–MA1863
- First run: 1972

The M/MA class are a class of diesel-hydraulic locomotives built by Walkers Limited, Maryborough for the Western Australian Government Railways in 1972–1973.

== History ==
Walkers Limited had previously supplied similar locomotives to the Emu Bay Railway (as the 11 class), Queensland Railways (as the DH class) and the New South Wales Government Railways (as the 73 class).

Two M Class were purchased for hump shunting at Forrestfield Marshalling Yard in 1972. They were fitted with cab signalling for this purpose. In 1973 a further three were purchased which were designated the MA class. These differed in having Caterpillar engines, were much lighter, could operate in multiple with each other and did not have cab signalling.

In January 1994, four were written off and sold to CSR in Queensland. M1851 was heavily rebuilt and converted to 610mm gauge by Walkers in 1996. It is currently in operation with Wilmar Sugar as DL28 "Jourama". M1852 was rebuilt similarly in 1997 and is in operation as DL29 "Cairns". MA1861 and MA1863 are currently stored in Queensland and are used for parts. MA1862 remained in service with Westrail, and later Transperth as the Claisebrook Depot shunter until 2014. In 2015, it was sold to the Hotham Valley Railway.

== Status list ==
Locomotive	Builders No.	Entered service	Written Off	Status
M1851	680	1972	1994	Sold to CSR, heavily rebuilt and converted to 610mm gauge by Walkers in 1996, currently in operation with Wilmar Sugar as DL28 "Jourama"
M1852	681	1972	1994	Sold to CSR, heavily rebuilt and converted to 610mm gauge by Walkers in 1997, currently in operation with Wilmar Sugar as DL29 "Cairns"
MA1861	713	1973	1994	Sold to CSR, stored at Pioneer Mill, Brandon, Queensland
MA1862	714	1973	2015	Sold to Hotham Valley Railway, stored at Pinjarra undergoing repaint prior to return to service late 2026.
MA1863	715	1973	1994	Sold to CSR, stored at Victoria Mill, Ingham, Queensland
