= Murchison River =

Murchison River may refer to the following:

- Murchison River (New Zealand)
- Murchison River (Tasmania)
- Murchison River (Western Australia)
- Murchison River (Nunavut) (Kuuk)
- Murchison River Gorge

== See also ==
- Murchison (disambiguation)
