= Mount Murchison =

Mount Murchison may refer to:

== Antarctica ==
- Mount Murchison (George V Coast), Antarctica
- Mount Murchison (Victoria Land), the highest peak in the Mountaineer Range, Antarctica

== Australia ==
- Mount Murchison, Queensland, a rural locality in the Shire of Banana
- Mount Murchison (Tasmania), a mountain on the West Coast
- Mount Murchison, a cattle station near Wilcannia in New South Wales

== Canada ==
- Mount Murchison (Alberta), a mountain in the Banff National Park

== New Zealand ==
- Mount Murchison (Canterbury), in the Southern Alps, Canterbury region
- Mount Murchison (Tasman), the highest peak in the Braeburn Range, Tasman Region

== See also ==
- Murchison Mountains, a mountain range in Fiordland, New Zealand
- Murchison (disambiguation)
