= Murchison Dam =

Dam and reservoir in Tasmania, Australia

- Location of the dam in Tasmania
- Interactive map of Murchison Dam
- Country: Australia
- Location: Western Tasmania
- Coordinates: 41°46′56″S 145°38′46″E
- Purpose: Power
- Status: Operational
- Construction began: 1978
- Opening date: 1982
- Built by: Hydro-Electric Commission (TAS)
- Owner: Hydro Tasmania

Dam and spillways
- Type of dam: Rock-fill dam
- Impounds: Murchison River
- Height (foundation): 93 m (305 ft)
- Length: 217 m (712 ft)
- Dam volume: 910×10^{3} m^{3} (32×10^{6} cu ft)
- Spillways: 1
- Spillway type: Uncontrolled
- Spillway length: 160 m (520 ft)
- Spillway capacity: 1,910 m^{3}/s (67,000 cu ft/s)

Reservoir
- Creates: Lake Murchison
- Total capacity: 96,910 ML (78,570 acre⋅ft)
- Catchment area: 750 km^{2} (290 sq mi)
- Surface area: 408 ha (1,010 acres)
- Normal elevation: 222 m (728 ft)

The Murchison Dam is a concrete-faced rock-filled embankment dam across the Murchison River, located near Tullah, within the northern part of the West Coast Range, in the western region of Tasmania, Australia. Completed in 1982 by the Hydro-Electric Commission (TAS), the resultant reservoir, Lake Murchison, was created for the purpose of generation of hydroelectricity as part of the Pieman Power Development. In addition to impounding the Murchison River, the dam's reservoir is also fed by the George Creek, the Anthony River, and discharge from the Tribute Power Station.

The dam is owned and operated by Hydro Tasmania.

== Location and features ==
The concrete-faced rock-filled dam wall is 93 metres (305 ft) high and 217 metres (712 ft) long. When full, the reservoir has capacity of 96,910 megalitres (78,570 acre⋅ft) and covers 408 to 450 hectares (1,010 to 1,110 acres), drawn from a catchment area of 750 square kilometres (290 sq mi). The uncontrolled spillway has a flow capacity of 1,910 cubic metres per second (67,000 cu ft/s). The spillway is 13 metres (43 ft) wide at the base, 10 metres (33 ft) high, 160 metres (520 ft) long, and is cut into dolerite bedrock.

Water from Lake Murchison is diverted to Lake Mackintosh and the Mackintosh Power Station by the 2-kilometre-long (1.2 mi) Sophia Tunnel, as part of the Pieman power development that was completed in 1987.

Upstream of the Murchison Dam is the White Spur Lake and dam, Henty Dam and its reservoir, Lake Newton and dam, Lake Plimsoll and Anthony Dam, and the Tribute Power Station. Downstream from the Murchison Dam is Lake Mackintosh, Tullabardine Dam, Mackintosh Dam, Mackintosh Power Station, Lake Rosebery, Bastyan Dam, Bastyan Power Station, Lake Pieman, Reece Dam and the Reece Power Station.

Hydro Tasmania completed an A$31–million upgrade of the dam wall and spillway to improve flood capacity. The crest wall was raised by 3 metres (9.8 ft), completed in 2020; And the spillway's right chute wall was raised between 2 to 5 metres (6 ft 7 in to 16 ft 5 in), completed in 2025. Given the remote location of the dam wall, access to the facility proved challenging.

== Etymology ==
The name of the dam is derived from the Murchison River and the adjacent Mount Murchison.

== See also ==
- List of reservoirs and dams in Tasmania
- List of power stations in Tasmania
