= Anthony River (Tasmania) =

River in Tasmania, Australia

Anthony
- Location of the Anthony River mouth in Tasmania

Location
- Country: Australia
- State: Tasmania
- Region: West Coast

Physical characteristics
- Source: Tyndall Range, West Coast Range
  - location: Mount Murchison
  - coordinates: 41°56′10″S 145°36′50″E
  - elevation: 719 m (2,359 ft)
- Mouth: Murchison River (Tasmania)
  - location: Lake Murchison
  - coordinates: 41°49′55″S 145°40′19″E
  - elevation: 227 m (745 ft)
- Length: 13 km (8.1 mi)

Basin features
- River system: Pieman River catchment
- Reservoirs / Lakes: Lake Huntley; Lake Rolleston; Lake Plimsoll; Lake Murchison

The Anthony River, part of the Pieman River catchment, is a perennial river in the West Coast region of Tasmania, Australia.

== Location and features ==
The river rises below the Tyndall Range on the northern slopes of the West Coast Range and drains Lake Huntley. The river flows east of Mount Murchison then north through Lake Rolleston before heading northwest and flowing through Lake Plimsoll. Thereafter the river flows northeast where it reaches its confluence with the Murchison River within Lake Murchison.

The river was dammed and combined with the waters of the Henty River for a minor hydro electric scheme, that followed the failure of the Hydro Tasmania plans to dam the Franklin and Gordon rivers.

The river also drains the glacial lakes of the northern end of the West Coast Range, and the Tyndalls.

== See also ==
- List of rivers of Australia § Tasmania
