= Emu Bay Railway =

Former railway company in Tasmania

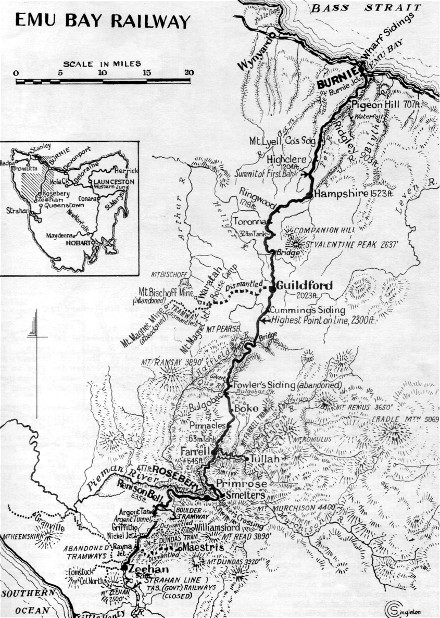
- Map of Emu Bay Railway
- Type: Public
- Industry: Railway operator
- Predecessor: Emu Bay to Mount Bischoff Railway Company
- Founded: 1897
- Defunct: 1998
- Successor: Tasrail
- Headquarters: Melbourne, Australia
- Area served: West Coast, Tasmania

The Emu Bay Railway was a Tasmania, Australian railway company. The railway was significant during full operation, in that it linked the Tasmanian Government Railways system at Burnie with that at Zeehan that further linked to the Mount Lyell railway allowing connection through to Queenstown.

It was listed on the Melbourne Stock Exchange. Following the closure of the Tasmanian government line at Zeehan railway station in 1960, until 1965, it operated the Melba Line on the West Coast of Tasmania following the closure of the Zeehan section until 1998.

== History ==
The origins of the Emu Bay Railway can be traced back to February 1878 when the Van Diemen's Land Company opened a 71 kilometre, horse drawn wooden tramway line from Emu Bay (Burnie) to Rouse's Camp, near Waratah, to serve the Mount Bischoff tin mines. The line was surveyed by John C Climie. In 1887, the line was taken over by the Emu Bay to Mount Bischoff Railway Company and relaid with steel rails as a 1,067 mm (3 ft 6 in) gauge railway line to allow steam locomotives to operate. In 1897 the Emu Bay Railway Company took over the line, extending it a further 60 kilometres to Zeehan on 21 December 1900.

There had been proposed connections to Gormanston or Queenstown in the late 1890s, however they did not eventuate. The maps in 1898 also included the assumed route of the proposed Great Western Railway that intersected with the proposed Emu Bay branch line at Leslie Junction.

Following the opening of the Murchison Highway, the line was closed between Rosebery and Zeehan in August 1965. In October 1966 EZ Industries, who were now responsible for 90% of traffic on the line, launched a takeover bid for the company. Although rejected by the directors, it was accepted by the shareholders in early 1967. In the late 1960s the line was upgraded to carry heavier trains and in January 1970 reopened from Rosebery to Melba Flats.

In December 1976, the company was relieved of its common carrier obligations. Thereafter the line was basically freight only except for a twice weekly mixed train which lasted until 1977, using West Coaster carriages ABL1 and 2, which retained their two-tone blue livery. During the construction of the Pieman River hydro electric scheme in the late 1970s the line was diverted in places and new bridges were built.

The Emu Bay Railway was included in the October 1984 sale of EZ Industries to North Broken Hill Peko, which in 1988 merged with CRA Limited to form Pasminco. In 1989, an 11 kilometre branch from Moorey Junction opened to serve Aberfoyle's Hellyer Mine. On 22 May 1998, the company was purchased from Pasminco by the Australian Transport Network and integrated into its Tasrail business.

== Passenger services ==
The Emu Bay Railway operated passenger services for its employees and, later, tourists. In 1921, it began operating two railmotors, a 12-seat Berliet and a 16-seat Argyle, between Guildford and Waratah. In 1940, a double bogie railcar was delivered by Walker Brothers of Wigan.

Due to an increase in tourist traffic, a service named The West Coaster was introduced between Burnie and Rosebery in October 1960. It was operated by two previously-stored Dübs and Company-built 4-8-0 steam locomotives, given the names Murchison and Heemskirk. They were converted to oil burners and repainted in two-tone blue livery, along with three former Tasmanian Government Railways carriages. Following the opening of the Murchison Highway, the West Coaster last ran on 2 January 1964.

== Rolling stock ==
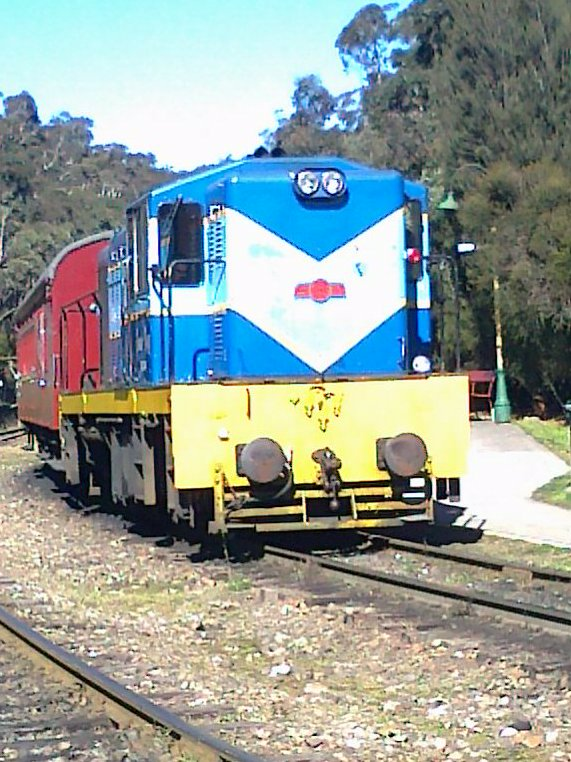
Preserved 1004 on the Zig Zag Railway in July 2011

The Emu Bay Railway operated steam locomotives built by British manufacturers. Notable were three Beyer, Peacock and Company built Garratts delivered in 1930, that were augmented in the 1950s by five Australian Standard Garratts purchased from the Queensland Railways and Tasmanian Government Railways.

In 1953, a North British Locomotive Company 0-8-0 diesel-hydraulic locomotive entered service. In 1963 the remaining steam locomotives were withdrawn after three 10 class diesel-hydraulics were delivered by Walkers Limited. A fourth was later assembled by the Tasmanian Government Railways' Launceston workshops. With a large increase in traffic forecast, in 1970/71 seven 11 class diesel-hydraulics entered service. The latter two classes operated in multiples of up to eight.

== In preservation ==
The two steam locomotives that operated the West Coaster in the 1960s have been preserved; no.6 Murchison at the West Coast Pioneers Museum, Zeehan and no.8 Heemskirk by the Don River Railway, the latter being restored to service in October 1997.

The North British Locomotive Company diesel has been preserved by the Derwent Valley Railway, while the 10 class have been preserved by the Don River, Walhalla Goldfields (Victoria) and Zig Zag Railways (New South Wales). The 11 class were all sold to Far North Queensland.

== See also ==
- Railways on the West Coast of Tasmania
