= Mackintosh Dam =

Dam and power station in Tasmania, Australia

- Location of the dam in Tasmania
- Interactive map of Mackintosh Dam
- Country: Australia
- Location: Western Tasmania
- Coordinates: 41°41′57″S 145°38′52″E
- Purpose: Power
- Status: Operational
- Opening date: 1981
- Owner: Hydro Tasmania

Dam and spillways
- Type of dam: Rock-fill dam
- Impounds: Mackintosh River
- Height: 75 m (246 ft)
- Length: 465 m (1,526 ft)
- Dam volume: 927×10^{3} m^{3} (32.7×10^{6} cu ft)
- Spillways: 1
- Spillway type: Uncontrolled
- Spillway capacity: 1,021 m^{3}/s (36,100 cu ft/s)

Reservoir
- Creates: Lake Mackintosh
- Total capacity: 913.69 GL (740,740 acre⋅ft)
- Catchment area: 512 km^{2} (198 sq mi)
- Surface area: 276.1 ha (682 acres)
- Maximum length: 17.5 km (10.9 mi)
- Maximum width: 3.5 km (2.2 mi)
- Maximum water depth: 60 m (200 ft)
- Normal elevation: 210 to 230 m (690 to 750 ft) AHD

Mackintosh Power Station
- Coordinates: 41°41′24″S 145°38′24″E
- Operator: Hydro Tasmania
- Commission date: 1982
- Type: Conventional
- Hydraulic head: 61 m (200 ft)
- Turbines: 1 x 81 MW (109,000 hp); Fuji Francis-type
- Installed capacity: 81 MW (109,000 hp)
- Capacity factor: 0.85
- Annual generation: 394 GWh (1,420 TJ)
- Website hydro.com.au

The Mackintosh Dam is a concrete-faced rock-fill embankment dam across the Mackintosh River, located in Western Tasmania, Australia. Located not far from the main dam is the Tullabardine Dam, a saddle dam across the Tullabardine Creek. Both dams were completed in 1981 and together they formed the resultant reservoir, Lake Mackintosh, established for the purpose of generating hydroelectricity via the Mackintosh Power Station, a conventional hydroelectric power station.

The dam, its reservoir, and the power station are owned and operated by Hydro Tasmania.

== Dam and reservoir overview ==
=== The two dams ===
The concrete-faced rock-filled dam wall of the Mackintosh Dam is 75 metres (246 ft) high and 465 metres (1,526 ft) long. When full, Lake Burbury has capacity of 913.69 gigalitres (740,740 acre⋅ft) and covers 276.1 hectares (682 acres), drawn from a catchment area of 512 square kilometres (198 sq mi). The single uncontrolled spillway is capable of discharging 1,021 cubic metres per second (36,100 cu ft/s).

The saddle dam, the Tullabardine Dam, is also a concrete-faced rock-filled dam that is 25 metres (82 ft) high and 214 metres (702 ft) long, located at 41°41′02″S 145°39′11″E.

=== Reservoir ===
The reservoir, Lake Mackintosh, runs north–south past Mount Farrell, adjacent to the town of Tullah. The reservoir is 17.5 kilometres (10.9 mi) long, 3.5 kilometres (2.2 mi) wide, and the shore is approximately 83 kilometres (52 mi) in circumference. The reservoir has three large islands and five small islets. The reservoir is fed by the Mackintosh, Sophia, Fury, Southwell, and Brougham rivers and the Mackintosh and Tullabardine creeks. The reservoir's outflow feeds the Mackintosh Power Station through Lake Rosebery. The Murchison River feeds into Lake Mackintosh through the Murchison Dam, to the south. The reservoir's deepest point is approximately 60 metres (200 ft) deep at the base of the main dam. It is one of the larger sized water impoundments of the Pieman power scheme.

The main basin of the reservoir was originally a Button Grass swamp prior to inundation. The Cradle Mountain-Lake St Clair National Park as a component part of the Tasmanian Wilderness World Heritage Area, has its western boundary lying to the east of the lake shores. The Murchison Highway borders the reservoir to the west.

== Hydroelectric power station ==
Part of the Pieman River scheme that comprises four hydroelectric power stations, the Mackintosh Power Station is the second station in the scheme. The power station is located aboveground at the foot of the dam wall. Water from Lake Mackintosh is fed to the power station by a 200-metre-long (660 ft) single tunnel.

The power station was commissioned in 1982 by the Hydro Electric Corporation (TAS) and the station has one Fuji Francis-type turbine, with a generating capacity of 81 megawatts (109,000 hp) of electricity. The station output, estimated to be 394 gigawatt-hours (1,420 TJ) annually, is fed to TasNetworks' transmission grid via a 13.8 kV/220 kV Fuji generator transformer to the outdoor switchyard.

The water discharged from Mackintosh Power Station flows into Lake Rosebery for use in the Bastyan Power Station.

== See also ==
- List of power stations in Tasmania
- List of reservoirs and dams in Australia § Tasmania
- List of lakes of Australia § Tasmania
