= Anthony Dam =

Dam and power station in Tasmania, Australia

- Location of the dam in Tasmania
- Interactive map of Anthony Dam
- Country: Australia
- Location: Western Tasmania
- Coordinates: 41°52′07″S 145°37′07″E
- Purpose: Power
- Status: Operational
- Opening date: 1993
- Owner: Hydro Tasmania

Dam and spillways
- Type of dam: Rock-fill dam
- Impounds: Anthony River
- Height: 40 m (130 ft)
- Length: 124 m (407 ft)
- Dam volume: 110×10^{3} m^{3} (3.9×10^{6} cu ft)
- Spillways: 1
- Spillway type: Uncontrolled
- Spillway capacity: 227 m^{3}/s (8,000 cu ft/s)

Reservoir
- Creates: Lake Plimsoll
- Total capacity: 36,180 ML (29,330 acre⋅ft)
- Catchment area: 37 km^{2} (14 sq mi)
- Surface area: 38.4 ha (95 acres)
- Normal elevation: 509 m (1,670 ft) AHD

Tribute Power Station
- Coordinates: 41°49′01″S 145°39′02″E
- Operator: Hydro Tasmania
- Commission date: 1994
- Type: Conventional
- Hydraulic head: 271 m (889 ft)
- Turbines: 1 x 84 MW (113,000 hp); Fuji Francis-type
- Installed capacity: 84 MW (113,000 hp)
- Capacity factor: 0.9
- Annual generation: 265 GWh (950 TJ)
- Website hydro.com.au

The Anthony Dam is a concrete-faced rock-fill embankment dam across the Anthony River, located in the West Coast region of Tasmania, Australia. Completed in 1993, the resultant reservoir, Lake Plimsoll, was established for the purpose of generation of hydroelectricity via the below-ground Tribute Power Station, a conventional hydroelectric power station. The dam, its reservoir, and the power station are owned and operated by Hydro Tasmania.

== Dam and reservoir overview ==
The concrete-face rockfill dam wall is 40 metres (130 ft) high and 124 metres (407 ft) long. When full, Lake Plimsoll has capacity of 36.18 gigalitres (29,330 acre⋅ft) and covers 38.4 hectares (95 acres), drawn from a catchment area of 37 square kilometres (14 sq mi). The uncontrolled spillway has a flow capacity of 227 cubic metres per second (8,000 cu ft/s).

Located adjacent to the main concrete-faced dam is the off-stream Anthony Levee, an earth core rock-fill saddle embankment that is 23 metres (75 ft) high and 95 metres (312 ft) long. The levee also impounds Lake Plimsoll.

== Hydroelectric power station ==
The Tribute Power Station is part of the Anthony Power Development scheme (which is part of the Pieman Power Development scheme). The proposed Anthony scheme comprised four hydroelectric power stations and five dams. However, due to political and legal considerations due to the Franklin Dam controversy, not all the dams or power stations were completed.

The Tribute Power Station is the first station in the scheme, being the highest upstream, yet the most-recent major hydro-electric power development completed in Tasmania. Located underground within the main dam wall, the power station receives water from the lake via a 7-kilometre (4.3 mi) headrace tunnel.

The power station was commissioned in 1994 by the Hydro Electric Corporation (TAS), in the aftermath of the Franklin Dam controversy, and the station has one Fuji Francis-type turbine, with a generating capacity of 84 megawatts (113,000 hp) of electricity. The station output, estimated to be 265 gigawatt-hours (950 TJ) annually, is fed to TasNetworks' transmission grid via a 13.8 kV/220 kV Fuji surface generator transformer to the outdoor switchyard.

Announced in 2008, the 1,000 GWH Project resulted in upgrades to component parts of existing superstructure operated by Hydro Tasmania.

== See also ==
- List of power stations in Tasmania
- List of reservoirs and dams in Tasmania
