= Eldon Range =

Mountain range in Tasmania, Australia

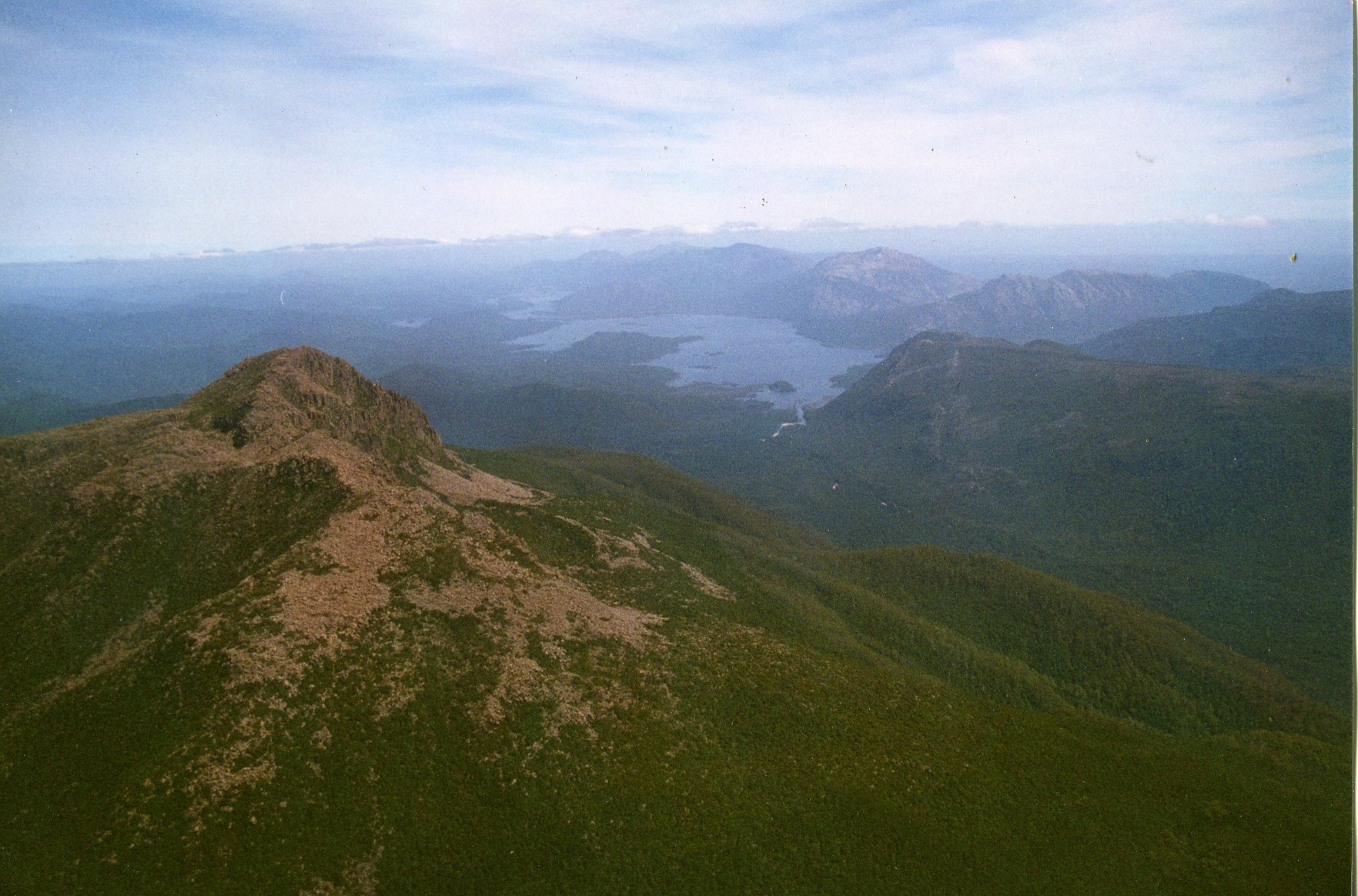
- Eldon Peak (left side) from the air from the north, looking south towards Lake Burbury and West Coast Range on right

Highest point
- Peak: Eldon Peak
- Elevation: 1,440 m (4,720 ft); AHD
- Coordinates: 41°58′12″S 145°43′48″E

Geography
- Location within Tasmania
- Country: Australia
- State: Tasmania
- Region: West Coast
- Range coordinates: 41°58′48″S 145°46′12″E

Geology
- Rock age: Jurassic
- Rock type: Dolerite

The Eldon Range is a mountain range in the west coast region of Tasmania, Australia.

The range is located at the north eastern edge of Lake Burbury and is part of the Tasmanian Wilderness World Heritage Area which includes the Franklin-Gordon Wild Rivers National Park.

The range is east of the main line of the West Coast Range and runs at right angle to it in a west–east direction. It is separated from that range by the King River valley and is bordered by the Eldon River to the north and west.

== Naming ==
It is claimed that Henry Hellyer named the present day Mount Farrell near Tullah with this same name in 1828 after Lord Eldon Lord Chancellor of England., Charles Gould in 1869 gives this name to the range.

== Peaks ==
Eldon Peak (41°58′12″S 145°43′48″E) is a mountain that is the highest point on the range. The peak has an elevation of 1,440 metres (4,720 ft) above sea level, and is the western peak, being number 23 of the Abels.

The similarly named Eldon Bluff (41°58′S 145°49′E) is the eastern peak. Eldon Bluff is 1,361 metres (4,465 ft) number 54 of The Abels.

A smaller peak to the south is known as the Little Eldons, with an elevation of 640 metres (2,100 ft) above sea level and it is separated from the Eldon Range by the South Eldon River. In the 1860s report of travels of Charles Gould, the Eldon range is mentioned.

In the 1930s Eldon Peak was used as the starting point of a walk by F Smithies of Launceston and C Bradshaw of Linda. In 1991 Crawford and Reid's climb is found described in Crawfords book on the King.

Eldon Peak is one of the least visited peaks in Tasmania due to its remoteness. It was climbed in 1947 by Keith Lancaster, a Tasmanian bushwalker who recorded a cairn on the summit, indicating it was not the first European ascent. Lancaster ascended from the King River valley, a route no longer possible due to the impoundment of the river. Modern approaches would be from the south-east or south arriving at Lake Ewart at the foot of Eldon Bluff. All approaches are over trackless terrain with patches of difficult scrub.

Part of the route from the south east follows the western border of the Cradle Mountain-Lake St Clair National Park, marked with poles by the bushman Charlie Spencer. Few of the poles still survive, and could not be relied upon. Navigation in this area would be extremely difficult in poor weather.

== Gallery ==
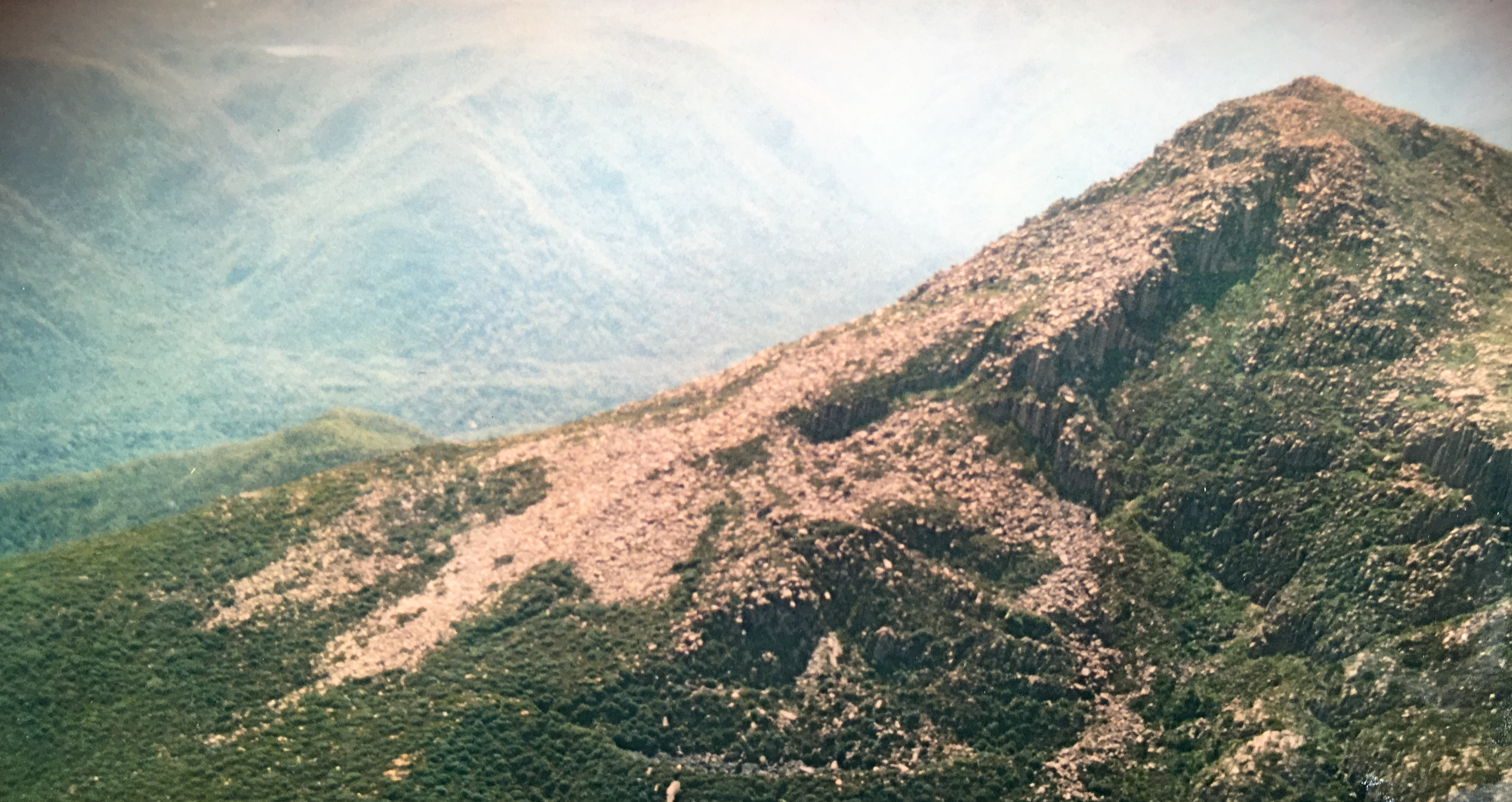
Eldon peak viewed from the south east

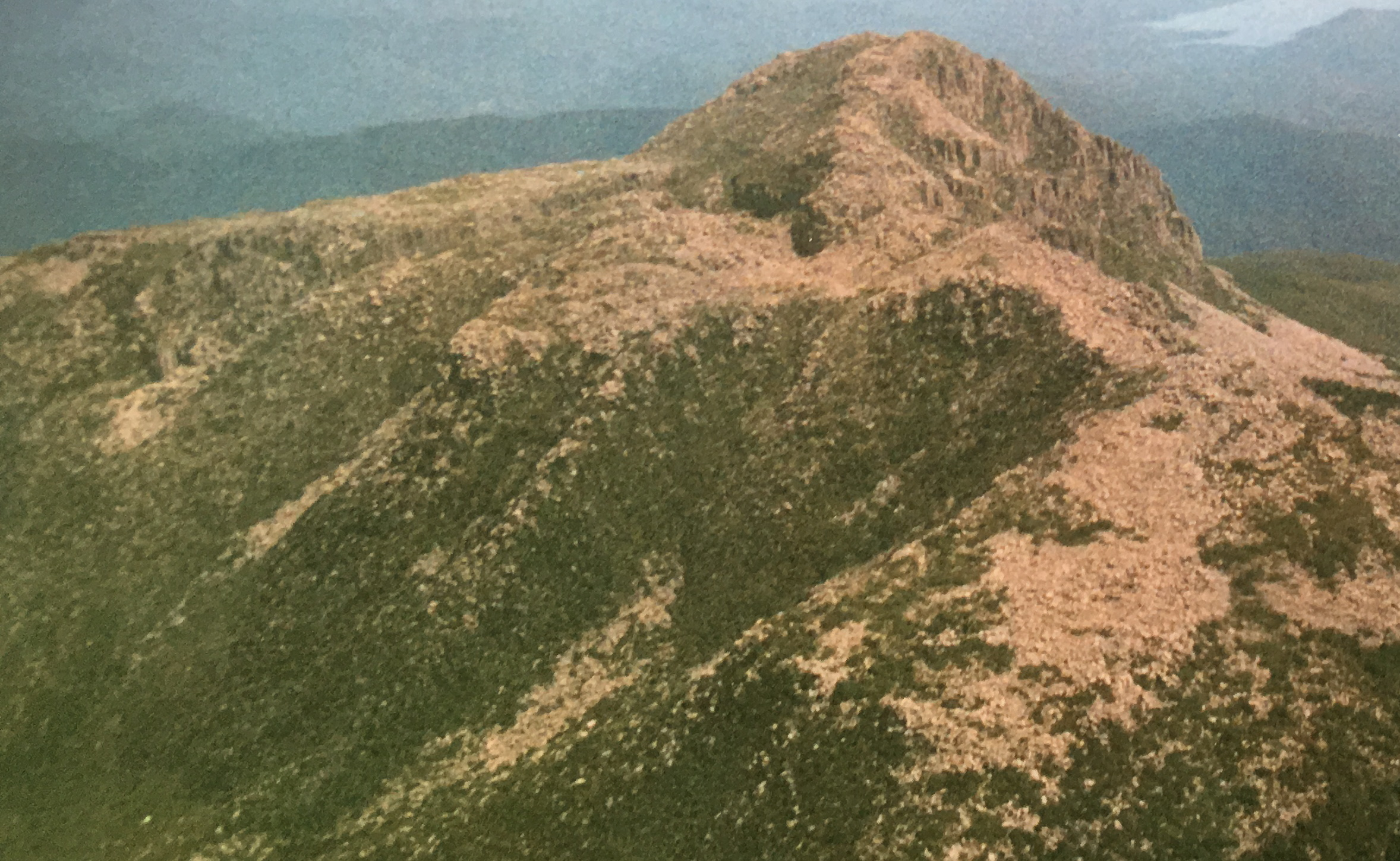
Eldon peak viewed from the north

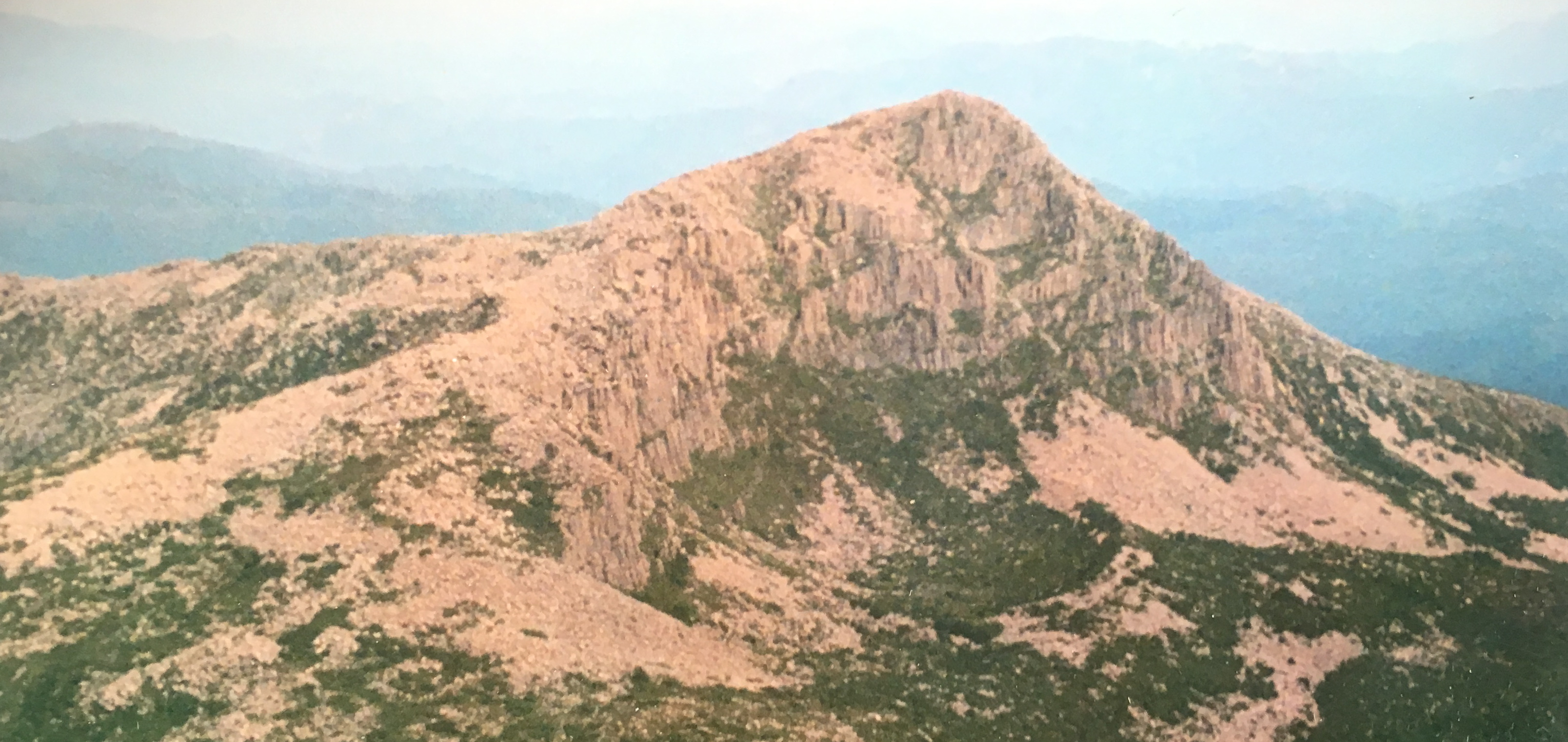
Eldon peak viewed from the west

== See also ==
- List of highest mountains of Tasmania
