= Emu Bay Railway 10 class =

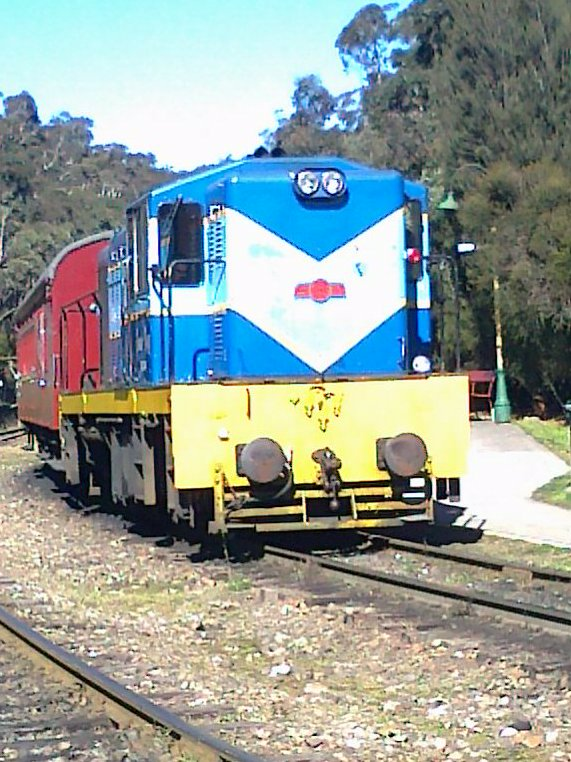
- 1004 on the Zig Zag Railway in July 2011
Type and origin
- Power type: Diesel-hydraulic
- Builder: Walkers Limited, Maryborough
- Build date: 1963-1966
- Total produced: 4
Specifications
- Configuration
  - UIC: Bo-Bo
- Gauge: 1,067 mm (3 ft 6 in)
- Wheel diameter: 1,020 mm (40.16 in)
- Loco weight: 51 tonnes (50 long tons; 56 short tons)
- Fuel type: Diesel
- Prime mover: Paxman 12YHXL
- Cylinders: 12
- Transmission: Voith L37zUb
- Loco brake: Vacuum
Performance figures
- Power output: 395 kW
Career
- Operators: Emu Bay Railway; Australian Transport Network
- Numbers: 1001-1004
- Disposition: All preserved

The Emu Bay Railway 10 class are a class of diesel-hydraulic locomotives built by Walkers Limited, Maryborough for the Emu Bay Railway between 1963 and 1966.

== History ==
In 1961, the Emu Bay Railway placed an order for three diesel-hydraulic locomotives with Tulloch. However, before they were built, Tullochs entered administration and the order was transferred to Walkers Limited. All were delivered in August 1963.

A fourth was assembled at the Tasmanian Government Railways’ Launceston Railway Workshops in April 1966.

In 1969/70, the pneumatic control gear was replaced with electro-pneumatic equipment to allow the class to operate in multiple with the 11 class. Between 1980 and 1992 all were repowered with the Caterpillar D398B as fitted to the 11 class.

All were included in the April 1998 sale of the Emu Bay Railway to the Australian Transport Network. Following the June 2000 closure of the Hellyer Mine, all were stored and disposed of to preservation organisations.

== Status table ==
Number	Builder’s number	Owner
1001	576/1963	Walhalla Goldfields Railway
1002	577/1963	Don River Railway
1003	578/1963	Zig Zag Railway
1004		Zig Zag Railway
