= Tullah, Tasmania =

Tullah
- Town
- Coordinates: 41°44′20″S 145°36′55″E
- Country: Australia
- State: Tasmania
- LGA: West Coast Council
- Location: 56 km (35 mi) from Queenstown; 97 km (60 mi) from Burnie

Government
  - State electorate: Braddon
  - Federal division: Braddon
- Elevation: 169 m (554 ft)

Population
  - Total: 202 (2021 census)
- Postcode: 7321

Tullah is a town in the northern part of the West Coast Range, on the west coast of Tasmania, Australia, about 111 km south of Burnie. The town has a population of approximately 202 people.

== Town ==
The town is roughly divided into two "suburbs", an older northern one, and a younger, more planned southern one. The northern half was originally a mining town called Mount Farrell, established in 1900 after silver lead ore was discovered in the area.

Mount Farrell Post Office opened on 1 April 1900 and was renamed Tullah in 1910.

== Hydro era ==
Tullah was later extended southwards by the Hydro-Electric Commission and used as a hydroelectric power scheme construction town during the making of the Pieman Scheme in the 1970s to early 1990s when its population reached 2500.

It is now mainly a community at the edge of Lake Rosebery and a fishing location. Prior to adequate roads being built in the area, it was serviced by the Wee Georgie Wood Railway under its earlier name of the North Farrell Tramway.

== Railway ==
The railway originally had four locomotives, a Krauss named "Puppy", an Orenstein and Koppel, Wee Georgie Wood and Wee Mary. Wee Mary was never restored and its chassis is currently in the Ida Bay/Lune River area. Prior to working in Tullah, Puppy worked in the Duck River region of the state and was eventually bought by the North Mt Farrell Co. The name "Puppy" was given due to its high pitched whistle, but it was originally Krauss number 2640 of 1892. The engine was eventually sold to Ida Bay Railway in the 1930s where it still is today. The most well known locomotive, Wee Georgie Wood, has been salvaged and returned to operation, but as at 2010, it had been stripped down due to restoration work while the diesel engine "Alpha Romeo" works the short track in its place. Today the majority of the original track is now under the waters of Lake Rosebery but a short length of track close to the Murchison Highway is still in use (known as the Wee Georgie Wood Railway), along with some rolling stock. The track is a two-foot (610 mm) gauge, standard at the time. The Wee Georgie Wood railway currently has the remains of another Krauss locomotive that worked in the Queenstown area, a few electric locomotives (two more of the same make are rotting at the western end of Gleadow Street in Launceston) and a gang motor from the original line. Beyond the highway, the remaining 600m of railway to the mines was repurposed into part of the Mackintosh Dam Road. A small timber line, approximately 7 km long, also ran south from the town.

Tullah features in the 1997 novel The Sound of One Hand Clapping by Richard Flanagan.

Wee Georgie Wood Railway tourist tramway running from Tullah, on a 1.9 km (1.2 miles) short track by the edge of Lake Rosebery.

== Local amenities ==
Tullah has a cafe, a post office (no deliveries, reception and sending only, bill payment service and banking), Tullah Tavern and the Tullah Lakeside Lodge (which both offer accommodation), a teddy bear shop, a woodwork shop, a football oval, and online access centre.

The town is located on the shore of Lake Rosebery. Small boats can, with care, be launched into the lake from the boat ramp off the main street, Farrell Street.

== Local attractions ==
Animals which can be seen in the area include: wombats, possums, wallabies, the occasional tiger quoll and (rarely) a Tasmanian devil.

Towns near Tullah include Rosebery, Zeehan, Queenstown, Strahan and Waratah. It is also near Cradle Mountain and (via Rosebery) the Montezuma Falls.

Local lakes include the Mackintosh, Pieman, Murchison, Plimsoll and Herbert. Local rivers include the Mackintosh, Sophia (south end of Lake Mackintosh), Murchison, Pieman, Que and Fossey and various tributaries and creeks, such as Animal Creek.

Nearby are Murchison Dam, and the Sophia Adit, a mine-style tunnel leading to the main Sophia Tunnel which links Murchison Dam with Lake Mackintosh. An alternative is the Mackintosh Dam and Tullabardine Dam. There are boat ramps into Lake Mackintosh.
