= Mount Black (Tasmania) =

Mountain in Tasmania, Australia

- Location within Tasmania

Highest point
- Elevation: 950 m (3,120 ft)
- Coordinates: 41°45′36″S 145°33′36″E

Geography
- Location: Western Tasmania, Australia
- Parent range: West Coast Range
- Topo map: 8014

Geology
- Rock age: Jurassic

Climbing
- Easiest route: Murchison Highway

Mount Black is a mountain on the West Coast Range located in the West Coast region of Tasmania, Australia. With an elevation of 950 metres (3,117 ft) above sea level, the mountain is located adjacent to the town of Rosebery.

The Murchison Highway passes around its lower slopes.

It is the location of some former exploration and mine sites.

== See also ==
- List of highest mountains of Tasmania
