= Rosebery, Tasmania =

Rosebery
- Town
- Coordinates: 41°46′45″S 145°32′25″E
- Country: Australia
- State: Tasmania
- LGA: West Coast Council
- Location: 315 km (196 mi) NW of Hobart; 109 km (68 mi) S of Burnie; 55 km (34 mi) N of Queenstown; 25 km (16 mi) N of Zeehan

Government
  - State electorate: House of Assembly: Braddon Legislative Council Division: Murchison
  - Federal division: Braddon
- Elevation: 165 m (541 ft)

Population
  - Total: 749 (UCL 2021)
- Postcode: 7470
- Mean max temp: 16.4 °C (61.5 °F)
- Mean min temp: 7.0 °C (44.6 °F)
- Annual rainfall: 1,952 mm (76.9 in)

Rosebery is a town on the west coast of Tasmania, Australia. It is at the northern end of the West Coast Range, in the shadow of Mount Black and adjacent to the Pieman River, now Lake Pieman.

It lies on the Murchison Highway, 25 kilometres north-east of Zeehan and is part of the Municipality of West Coast Council. At the 2021 census, Rosebery had a population of 752.

The population of Rosebery declined by 22% in the years between 1996-2001. Its newer western area on the shore of Lake Pieman is known as Primrose.

== History ==
Like most of the other settlements on the west coast of Tasmania, Rosebery is a mining town. In 1893, prospector Tom McDonald discovered gold in alluvial wash, along with boulders of zinc-lead sulphide in dense rainforest on the slopes of Mount Black. McDonald pegged several claims in the name of the Rosebery Prospecting Association (named after Lord Rosebery), which later became the Rosebery Gold Mining Company. The South Rosebery Mining Company was formed soon after to mine the southern continuation of the orebody.

In 1896, the Rosebery Gold Mining Company was reconstructed as the Tasmanian Copper Company, and the South Rosebery Mining Company became the Primrose Mining Company. Rosebery Post Office opened on 1 November 1897.

The main mineral found in the orebody was sphalerite, but due to the lack of a technique to successfully extract the zinc from the ore, little could be done to exploit the orebody. One company formed to experiment in the processing of zinc ores was the Tasmanian Metals Extraction Company (TME) who built a large plant next to the track to Williamsford, completed in 1912. The experiment was unsuccessful and the plant closed in 1914.

The Rosebery mines passed into the hands of the Mount Lyell Mining and Railway company in 1916, and the mines were eventually merged with the Electrolytic Zinc Company of Australasia (EZ), who had discovered an effective method for the extraction of zinc. In 1926, construction of a processing mill at Rosebery began, and in 1931, an aerial ropeway to transport ore from the Hercules Mine near Williamsford was completed. Due to the Great Depression, the Rosebery Mill was not completed until 1936. The Rosebery Mine has operated continuously since then, with 75 year celebrations held during February, 2011. The mine is currently operated by Minerals and Metals Group (MMG), producing zinc, lead, copper, silver and gold. Previous mine owners included Pasminco and Zinifex.

Prior to the completion of the Murchison Highway in 1963, the town was connected with Burnie and North West Tasmania via the Emu Bay Railway.

== Climate ==
Rosebery has a damp oceanic climate (Cfb) with cool to mild, damp, unstable summers and cool to cold, very wet winters. Sunshine is low; the city only receives 16.5 clear days annually, and as much as 168.1 cloudy days per annum. February is the driest month and September the wettest, as the westerly wind belt (i.e. Roaring Forties) prevails in the region. Snow falls on an average of 2.8 days a year.

Climate data for Rosebery (HEC Substation, 1979–1993); 165 m AMSL; 41.78° S, 145.54° E
Month	Jan	Feb	Mar	Apr	May	Jun	Jul	Aug	Sep	Oct	Nov	Dec	Year
Record high °C (°F)	38.0 (100.4)	36.8 (98.2)	31.5 (88.7)	28.0 (82.4)	24.5 (76.1)	17.7 (63.9)	16.1 (61.0)	19.1 (66.4)	22.5 (72.5)	27.6 (81.7)	32.0 (89.6)	35.6 (96.1)	38.0 (100.4)
Mean daily maximum °C (°F)	21.0 (69.8)	21.9 (71.4)	20.1 (68.2)	17.0 (62.6)	14.1 (57.4)	11.3 (52.3)	11.0 (51.8)	12.1 (53.8)	13.3 (55.9)	16.4 (61.5)	18.6 (65.5)	20.5 (68.9)	16.4 (61.5)
Mean daily minimum °C (°F)	10.1 (50.2)	9.7 (49.5)	9.2 (48.6)	7.7 (45.9)	6.2 (43.2)	4.3 (39.7)	3.5 (38.3)	4.3 (39.7)	5.0 (41.0)	6.4 (43.5)	7.7 (45.9)	9.6 (49.3)	7.0 (44.6)
Record low °C (°F)	3.5 (38.3)	1.8 (35.2)	2.5 (36.5)	0.5 (32.9)	0.0 (32.0)	−3.0 (26.6)	−3.0 (26.6)	−2.5 (27.5)	−1.5 (29.3)	−1.0 (30.2)	−0.5 (31.1)	2.8 (37.0)	−3.0 (26.6)
Average rainfall mm (inches)	129.5 (5.10)	81.6 (3.21)	102.8 (4.05)	150.7 (5.93)	172.7 (6.80)	199.9 (7.87)	208.7 (8.22)	211.1 (8.31)	233.2 (9.18)	189.7 (7.47)	147.0 (5.79)	134.5 (5.30)	1,961.4 (77.23)
Average rainy days (≥ 0.2 mm)	17.0	12.9	16.3	18.1	20.6	21.7	22.4	24.8	23.1	21.3	17.3	17.2	232.7
Source: Bureau of Meteorology

== Notable residents ==
- Richard Flanagan – author, historian and film director

== Gallery ==
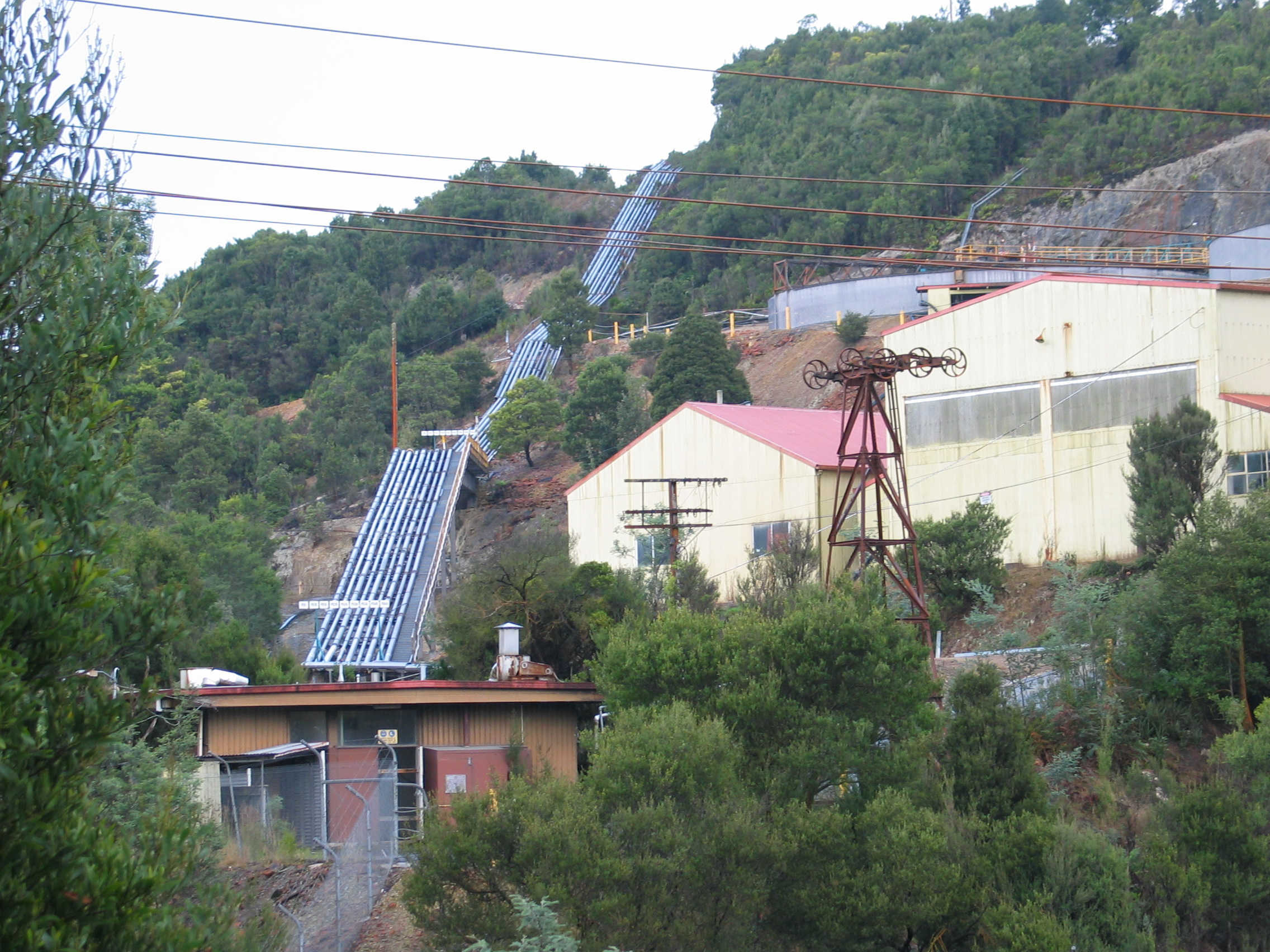
Mine buildings

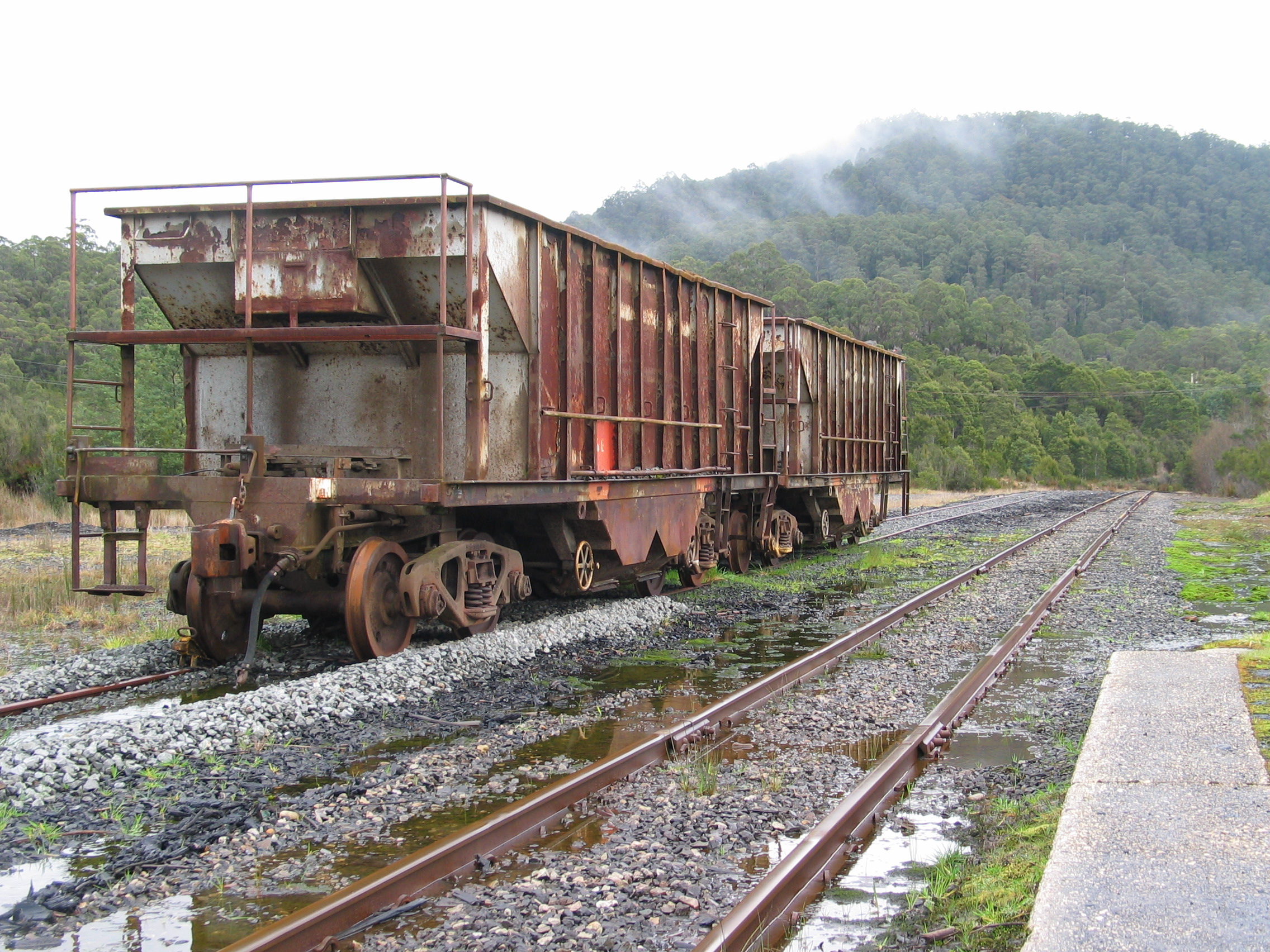
Rosebery station

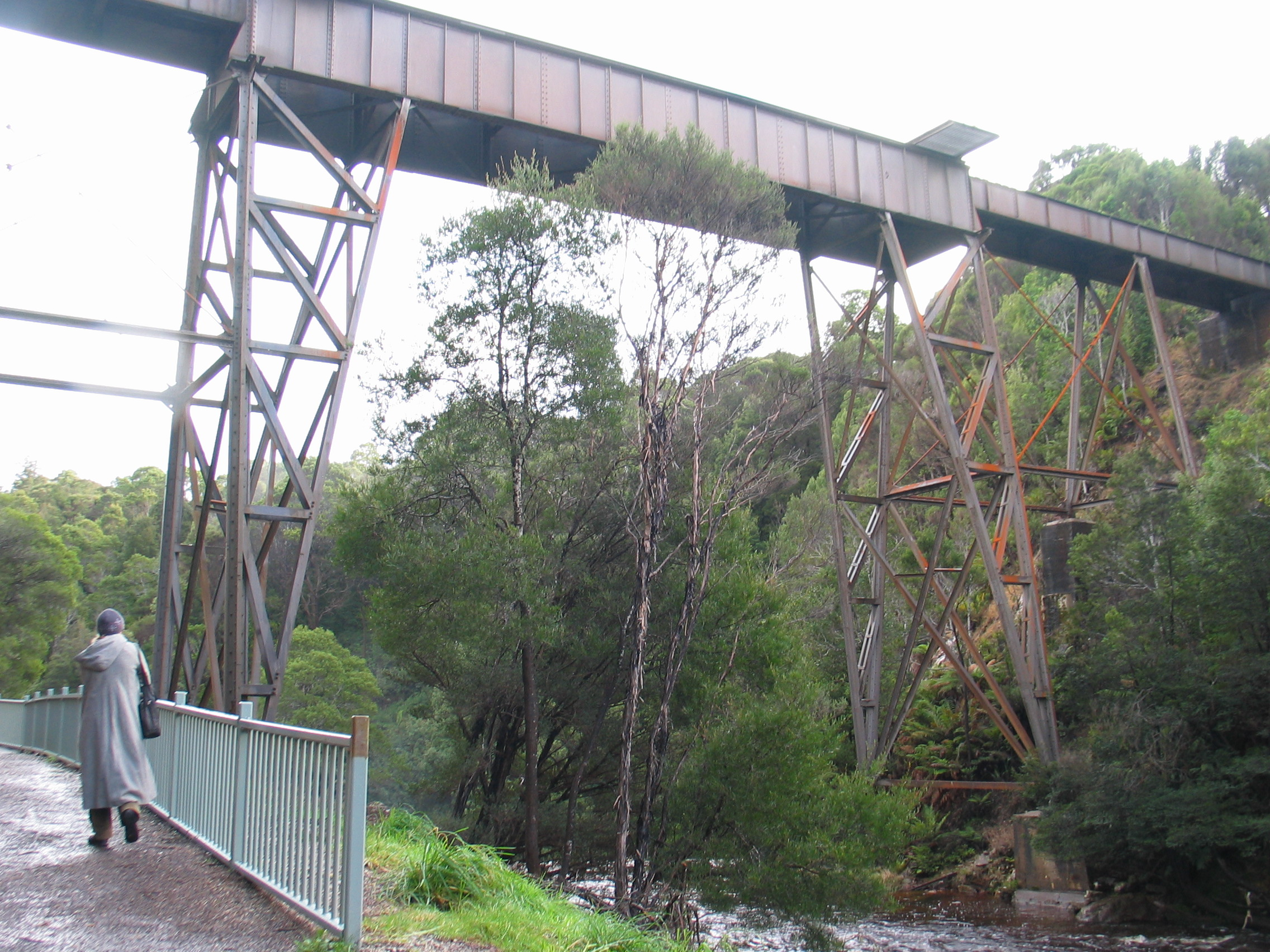
Railway Bridge over Rosebery Creek

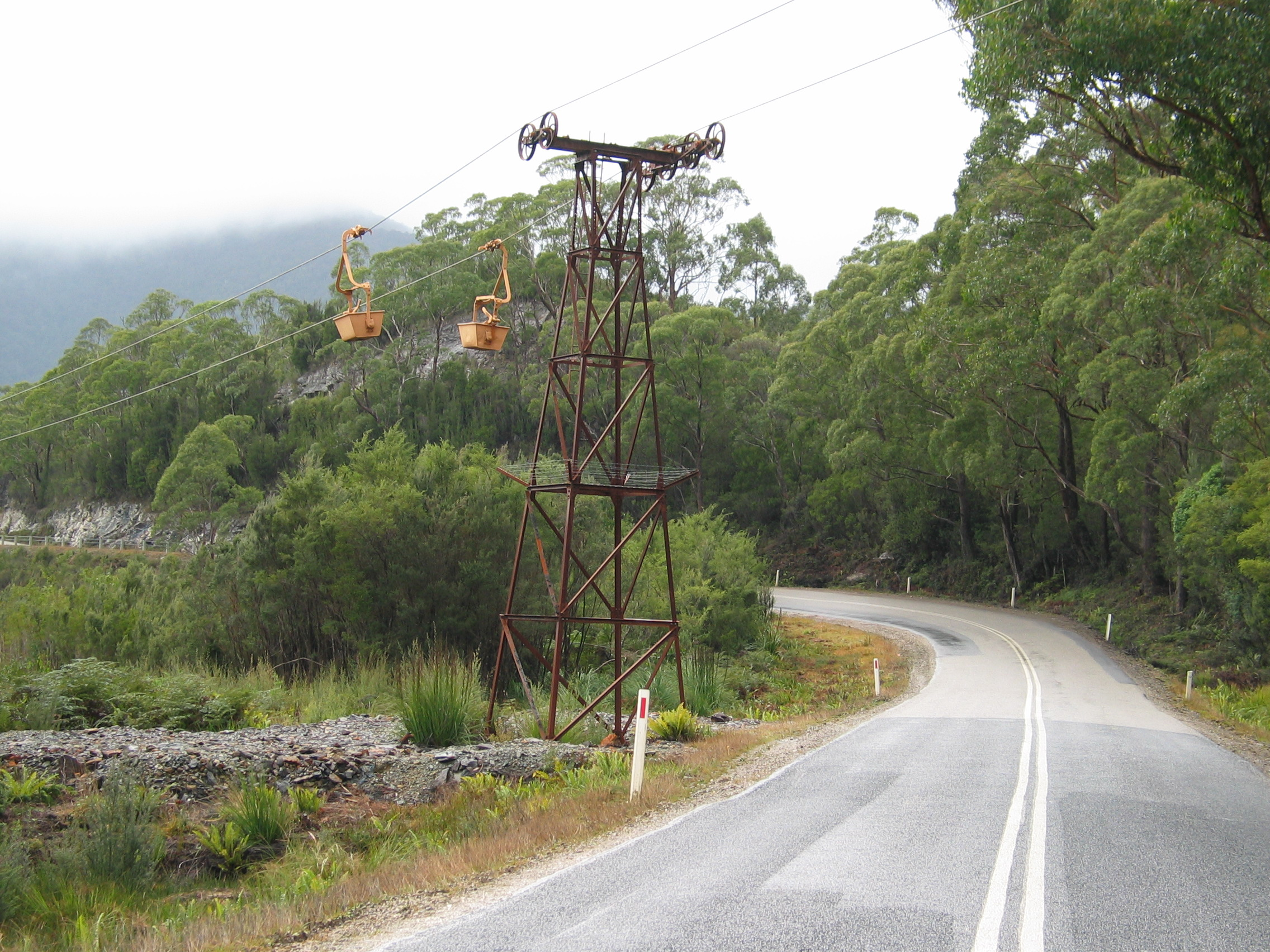
Disused ore bucketway

Stitt Falls, Rosebery Creek

== See also ==
- West Coast Tasmania Mines
- West Coast Tasmania Railways
