= Emu Bay Railway 11 class =

Class of Australian diesel-hydraulic locomotives

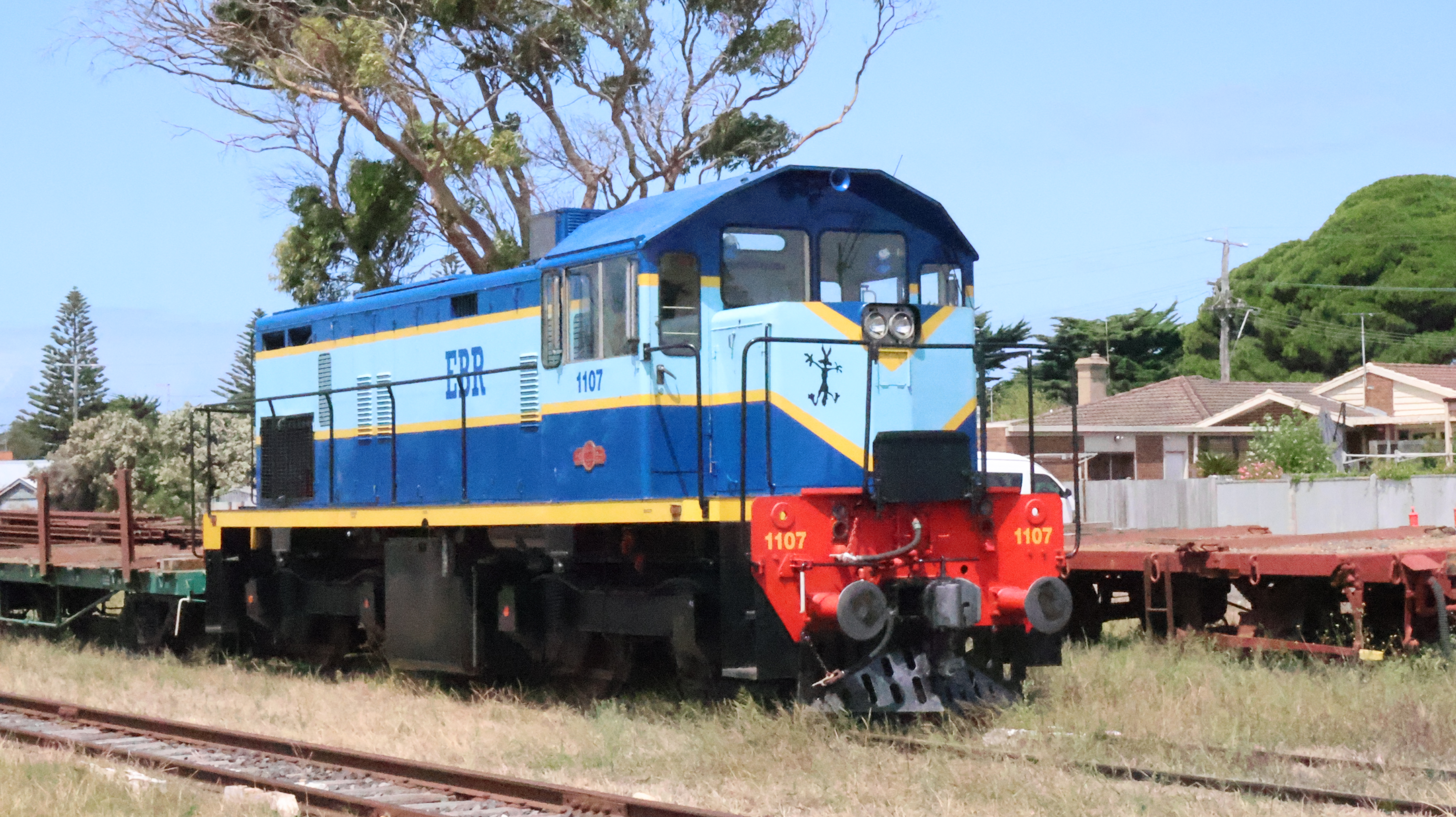
- 1107 on the Bellarine Railway.
Type and origin
- Power type: Diesel-hydraulic
- Builder: Walkers Limited, Maryborough
- Build date: 1969-1971
- Total produced: 7
Specifications
- Configuration
  - UIC: Bo-Bo
- Gauge: 1,067 mm (3 ft 6 in)
- Wheel diameter: 91 centimetres
- Loco weight: 54 tonnes
- Fuel type: Diesel
- Prime mover: Caterpillar D398B
- Cylinders: 12
- Transmission: Voith L37zUb
- Loco brake: Vacuum
Performance figures
- Power output: 522 kW (700 hp)
Career
- Operators: Emu Bay Railway; Australian Transport Network
- Numbers: 1101-1107

The Emu Bay Railway 11 class are a class of diesel-hydraulic locomotives built by Walkers Limited, Maryborough for the Emu Bay Railway between 1969 and 1971.

== History ==
In 1968, with EZ Industries and the Mount Lyell Mining & Railway Company to establish a sulphuric acid plant in Burnie, the Emu Bay Railway ordered five diesel-hydraulic locomotives from Walkers Limited to the same design as the Queensland Railways DH class. All were delivered in December 1969. A further two were delivered in March 1971.

All were included in the April 1998 sale of the Emu Bay Railway to the Australian Transport Network. Following the cessation of vacuum braked trains in March 2002, they were withdrawn and sold to Queensland operators. By 2019, six were owned by Cairns Kuranda Rail Services and one by Downer Rail.

== Status table ==
Number	Builder's number	Owner
1101	638/1969	Cairns Kuranda Rail Services
1102	639/1969	Cairns Kuranda Rail Services
1103	640/1969	Cairns Kuranda Rail Services
1104	641/1969	Downer Rail, Maryborough, Queensland
1105	642/1969	Cairns Kuranda Rail Services
1106	643/1970	Cairns Kuranda Rail Services
1107	644/1971	Bellarine Railway
