= Bastyan Dam =

Dam and power station in Tasmania, Australia

- Location of the dam in Tasmania
- Interactive map of Bastyan Dam
- Country: Australia
- Location: Western Tasmania
- Coordinates: 41°44′08″S 145°32′01″E
- Purpose: Power
- Status: Operational
- Construction began: 1974
- Opening date: 1983
- Owner: Hydro Tasmania

Dam and spillways
- Type of dam: Rock-fill dam
- Impounds: Pieman River
- Height: 75 m (246 ft)
- Length: 510 m (1,670 ft)
- Dam volume: 570×10^{3} m^{3} (20×10^{6} cu ft)
- Spillways: 1
- Spillway type: Uncontrolled
- Spillway capacity: 2,806 m^{3}/s (99,100 cu ft/s)

Reservoir
- Creates: Lake Rosebery
- Total capacity: 123.52 GL (100,140 acre⋅ft)
- Catchment area: 1,397 km^{2} (539 sq mi)
- Surface area: 74.4 ha (184 acres)
- Normal elevation: 154 m (505 ft) AHD

Bastyan Power Station
- Coordinates: 41°43′48″S 145°31′48″E
- Operator: Hydro Tasmania
- Commission date: 1993
- Type: Conventional
- Hydraulic head: 61 m (200 ft)
- Turbines: 1 x 81 MW (109,000 hp); Fuji Francis-type
- Installed capacity: 81 MW (109,000 hp)
- Capacity factor: 0.85
- Annual generation: 405 GWh (1,460 TJ)
- Website hydro.com.au

The Bastyan Dam is a concrete-faced rock-fill embankment dam across the Pieman River, located near Tullah, in the West Coast region of Tasmania, Australia. Completed in 1983, the resultant reservoir, Lake Rosebery, was established for the purpose of generation of hydroelectricity via the adjacent Bastyan Power Station, a conventional hydroelectric power station. The dam, its reservoir, and the power station are owned and operated by Hydro Tasmania.

== Dam and reservoir overview ==
The concrete-face rockfill dam wall is 75 metres (246 ft) high and 510 metres (1,670 ft) long. When full, Lake Rosebery has capacity of 123.52 gigalitres (100,140 acre⋅ft) and covers 744 hectares (1,840 acres), drawn from a catchment area of 1,397 square kilometres (539 sq mi). The uncontrolled spillway has a flow capacity of 2,806 cubic metres per second (99,100 cu ft/s).

Located adjacent to the rock-fill embankment dam is the off-stream Bastyan Levee, an earth-filled saddle embankment that is 14 metres (46 ft) high and 55 metres (180 ft) long. The levee also impounds Lake Rosebery.

=== Reservoir ===
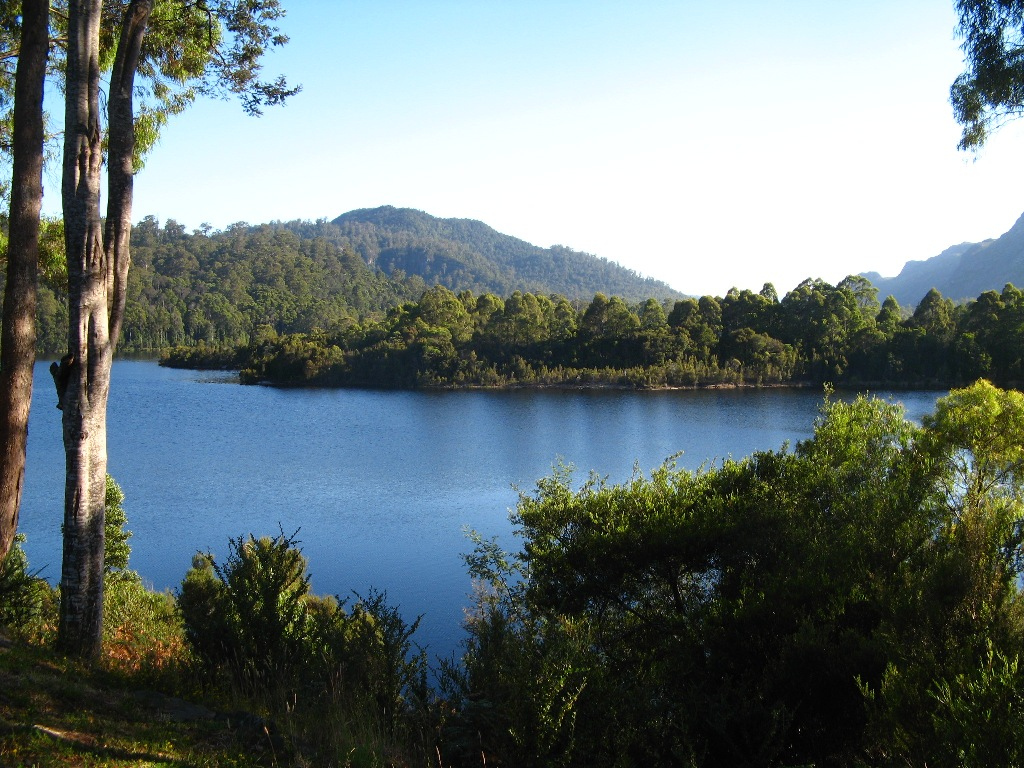
A view of the lake

Lake Rosebery is fed by both the Murchison and Mackintosh rivers and their confluence formed the Pieman River, submerged below the lake's surface following the damming in 1983. At the time of the dam's construction, the Emu Bay and the Wee Georgie Wood railway lines were diverted to run close to the reservoir's shore.

In January 2025, 4,000 to 5,000 litres (880 to 1,100 imp gal; 1,100 to 1,300 US gal) of oil entered the reservoir after a tank on private property leaked in heavy rain.

== Hydroelectric power station ==
Part of the Pieman River Power Development scheme that comprises four hydroelectric power stations, the Bastyan Power Station is the third station in the scheme. The power station is located aboveground at the foot of the dam wall. Water from the lake is fed to the power station near the centre of the dam wall by a 150-metre (490 ft) single penstock tunnel.

The power station was commissioned in 1983 by the Hydro Electric Corporation (TAS) and the station has one Fuji Francis-type turbine, with a generating capacity of 81 megawatts (109,000 hp) of electricity. The station output, estimated to be 405 gigawatt-hours (1,460 TJ) annually, is fed to TasNetworks' transmission grid via a 13.8 kV/220 kV Fuji generator transformer to the outdoor switchyard.

The water discharged from the Bastyan Power Station is impounded by the Reece Dam into Lake Pieman for use in the Reece Power Station.

== See also ==
- List of power stations in Tasmania
- List of reservoirs and dams in Tasmania
