= Reece Dam =

Dam and power station in Tasmania, Australia

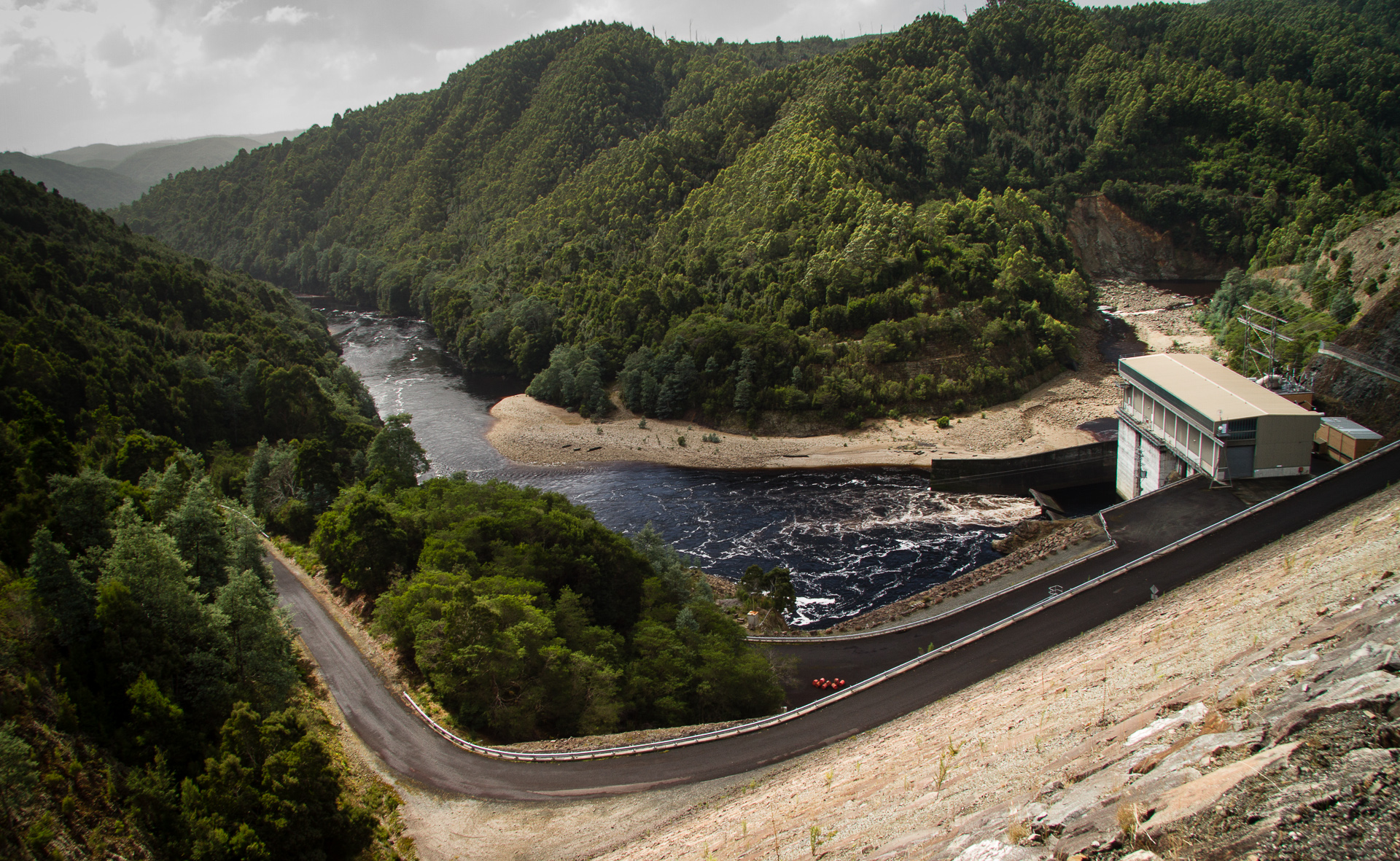
- The power station, at right, below the dam wall, 2013

- Location of the dam in Tasmania
- Country: Australia
- Location: West Coast, Tasmania
- Coordinates: 41°43′30″S 145°08′04″E
- Purpose: Power
- Status: Operational
- Construction began: 1974
- Opening date: 1986
- Owner: Hydro Tasmania

Dam and spillways
- Type of dam: Rock-fill dam
- Impounds: Pieman River
- Height: 122 m (400 ft)
- Length: 374 m (1,227 ft)
- Dam volume: 2,742×10^{3} m^{3} (96.8×10^{6} cu ft)
- Spillways: 1
- Spillway type: Uncontrolled
- Spillway capacity: 4,742 m^{3}/s (167,500 cu ft/s)

Reservoir
- Creates: Lake Pieman
- Total capacity: 300.2 GL (243,400 acre⋅ft)
- Catchment area: 2,653 km^{2} (1,024 sq mi)
- Surface area: 222 ha (550 acres)
- Normal elevation: 92 m (302 ft) AHD

Reece Power Station
- Coordinates: 41°43′25″S 145°08′10″E
- Operator: Hydro Tasmania
- Commission date: 1987
- Type: Conventional
- Hydraulic head: 92 m (302 ft)
- Turbines: 2 x Fuji Francis-type
- Installed capacity: 238 MW (319,000 hp)
- Capacity factor: 0.85
- Annual generation: 1,025 GWh (3,690 TJ)
- Website hydro.com.au

The Reece Dam (also called the Lower Pieman Dam) is a concrete-faced rock-fill embankment dam across the Pieman River, in the West Coast region of Tasmania, Australia. Completed in 1986, the resultant reservoir, Lake Pieman, was established for the purpose of generation of hydroelectricity via the adjacent Reece Power Station, a conventional hydroelectric power station.

== Dam overview ==
The concrete-face rockfill dam wall is 122 metres (400 ft) high and 374 metres (1,227 ft) long. When full, the reservoir has capacity of 300.2 gigalitres (243,400 acre⋅ft) and covers 222 hectares (550 acres), drawn from a catchment area of 2,653 square kilometres (1,024 sq mi). The uncontrolled spillway has a flow capacity of 4,742 cubic metres per second (167,500 cu ft/s). The reservoir receives water from Lake Rosebery.

Lake Pieman is a long, narrow lake that follows the line of the Pieman River from the Reece Dam back to Rosebery and the Bastyan Dam.

== Hydroelectric power station ==
Part of the Pieman Power Development scheme that comprises four hydroelectric power stations, the Reece Power Station is the final station in the scheme, before the water runs out to sea. The power station is located aboveground at the foot of the dam wall. Water from the lake is fed to the power station into two independent 250-metre (820 ft)-long tunnels.

The power station was commissioned in 1986 and 1987 by the Hydro Electric Corporation (TAS) and the station has two Fuji Francis turbines, with a combined generating capacity of 238 megawatts (319,000 hp) of electricity. The station output, estimated to be 1,025 gigawatt-hours (3,690 TJ) annually, is fed to TasNetworks' transmission grid via a 13.8 kV/220 kV Fuji generator transformer to the outdoor switchyard.

== Etymology ==
Both the dam and the power station were named in honour of Eric Reece, the Premier of Tasmania between 1958 and 1969 and again between 1972 and 1975. Reece was a firm proponent of the Hydro-Electric Commission and the development of hydroelectricity in Tasmania.

== See also ==
- List of power stations in Tasmania
- List of reservoirs and dams in Australia § Tasmania
- List of lakes of Australia § Tasmania
