= Mackintosh River =

River in Western Tasmania, Australia

Mackintosh
- Location of the Mackintosh River mouth in Tasmania

Location
- Country: Australia
- State: Tasmania
- Region: West Coast

Physical characteristics
- Source: West Coast Range
- Source confluence: Mackintosh Creek and Fury River
  - location: below Mount Remus
  - coordinates: 41°37′47″S 145°46′10″E
  - elevation: 236 m (774 ft)
- Mouth: Pieman River
  - location: below Tullah
  - coordinates: 41°44′00″S 145°36′38″E
  - elevation: 161 m (528 ft)
- Length: 20 km (12 mi)

Basin features
- River system: Pieman River catchment
- Tributaries
  - left: Sophia River
  - right: Southwell River
- Reservoir: Lake Mackintosh

The Mackintosh River, part of the Pieman River catchment, is a major perennial river located in the West Coast region of Tasmania, Australia. The river was named in November 1828 by Henry Hellyer, a surveyor of the Van Diemans Land Company, in honour of Sir James Mackintosh, son of John Mackintosh of Kyllachy, Inverness-shire

== Course and features ==
Formed by the confluence of the Fury River and Mackintosh Creek, the Mackintosh River rises below Mount Remus, part of the northern section of the West Coast Range. The river flows a short distance, through what is now known as Lake Mackintosh, joined by four tributaries including the Sophia River and Southwell River, emptying into the Pieman River. The Mackintosh River is impounded by the Mackintosh Dam, the site of the adjacent hydroelectric power station that forms part of the Hydro Tasmania-operated Pieman River Power Development. The river descends 75 metres (246 ft) over its 20-kilometre (12 mi) course.

Hydrological measurements on this river by Hydro Tasmania began in 1955.

The easternmost point of the river catchment is defined by Barn Bluff where it also borders with the Murchison River river catchment. The southern portion of the catchment has a very narrow separation from the adjacent Murchison River, where the Sophia River is the main river. The northern side of the Sophia river catchment, a creek known as White Hawk, drains ground with features known as Granite Tor, and High Tor, which lie due east of Tullah. The northern Mackintosh catchment has a number of named tributaries. From the orientation of Mount Romulus, Fury River which originates near Barn Bluff, is the main eastern tributary. Mount Remus is drained to the south by Schist Creek which flows into the Fury River, and to the west, Devils Ravine. In the north east of the catchment area, Mayday Mountain is drained by Belvoir River. The north west area the Southwell River drains the eastern slopes of Mount Charles, which is north east of Mount Black.

The river name is used in cartography of the area, with the river name being allocated to current maps, as well as significantly early maps of the region.

== See also ==
- List of rivers of Tasmania
- Mackintosh Power Station
- Rivers of Tasmania
