= EZ Industries =

- Industry: Mining
- Founded: 1916
- Founder: Amalgamated Zinc
- Defunct: 1984
- Fate: Taken over by North Broken Hill Peko
- Headquarters: Melbourne, Australia
- Products: Zinc, lead
- Subsidiaries: Emu Bay Railway; Energy Resources of Australia (31%)

EZ Industries, formerly the Electrolytic Zinc Company, was a zinc miner and refiner in Australia.

== History ==
EZ Industries was established in 1916 by Amalgamated Zinc as the Electrolytic Zinc Company to operate the Risdon Zinc Works on the banks of the River Derwent in Risdon, Tasmania. It was renamed EZ Industries in February 1957. In 1967, EZ purchased the Emu Bay Railway.

In February 1983, EZ opened the Elura Mine near Cobar, New South Wales. It built a 45 kilometre railway line to connect with the Main Western railway line to move zinc to Newcastle for shipping to Risdon. In 1984, EZ was taken over by North Broken Hill Peko.

EZ owned a 31% stake in the Ranger Uranium Mine through its Energy Resources of Australia shareholding.
