= Murchison River (Tasmania) =

River in Tasmania, Australia

Murchison
- Location of the Murchison River mouth in Tasmania

Location
- Country: Australia
- State: Tasmania
- Region: West Coast

Physical characteristics
- Source: West Coast Range
  - location: below Pyramid Mountain
  - coordinates: 41°59′19″S 145°54′56″E
  - elevation: 773 m (2,536 ft)
- Mouth: Pieman River
  - location: below Tullah
  - coordinates: 41°44′00″S 145°36′38″E
  - elevation: 160 m (520 ft)
- Length: 64 km (40 mi)

Basin features
- River system: Pieman River catchment
- Tributaries
  - left: Anthony River
  - right: Wallace River (Tasmania), Achilles River, Bluff River (Murchison River)
- Reservoirs: Lake Murchison, Lake Rosebery

The Murchison River, part of the Pieman River catchment, is a major perennial river located in the West Coast region of Tasmania, Australia.

== Course and features ==
The Murchison River rises below Pyramid Mountain, part of the north eastern section of the West Coast Range within the Cradle Mountain-Lake St Clair National Park. The river flows generally northwest, joined by six tributaries including the Wallace, Achilles, Bluff, and Anthony rivers and flowing through the impoundment, Lake Murchison. The river reaches its confluence with the Mackintosh River to form the Pieman River near Tullah in what is now Lake Rosebery, formed by the impounding of the Pieman by the Bastyan Dam.

The river catchment easternmost point can be located at Mount Pelion West, while the junction point in the river catchments of the Mackintosh River and the Murchison can be located at Barn Bluff. The catchment is bordered to the south by the Eldon Range, and its south western area is in the West Coast Range, with the Tyndall Range and Lake Rolleston on its south west border.

The Murchison River forms part of the Pieman River Power Development scheme. The Murchison Dam across the Murchison River was constructed in the 1980s by Hydro Tasmania. The dam forms the narrow Lake Murchison that lies east of Mount Murchison. Water from the dam is fed through the Sophia Tunnel into Lake Mackintosh for hydroelectric power generation.

== See also ==
- List of rivers of Tasmania
- Rivers of Tasmania
- Mackintosh Power Station
