= Mount Murchison (Tasmania) =

Mountain in West Coast Range, Western Tasmania, Australia

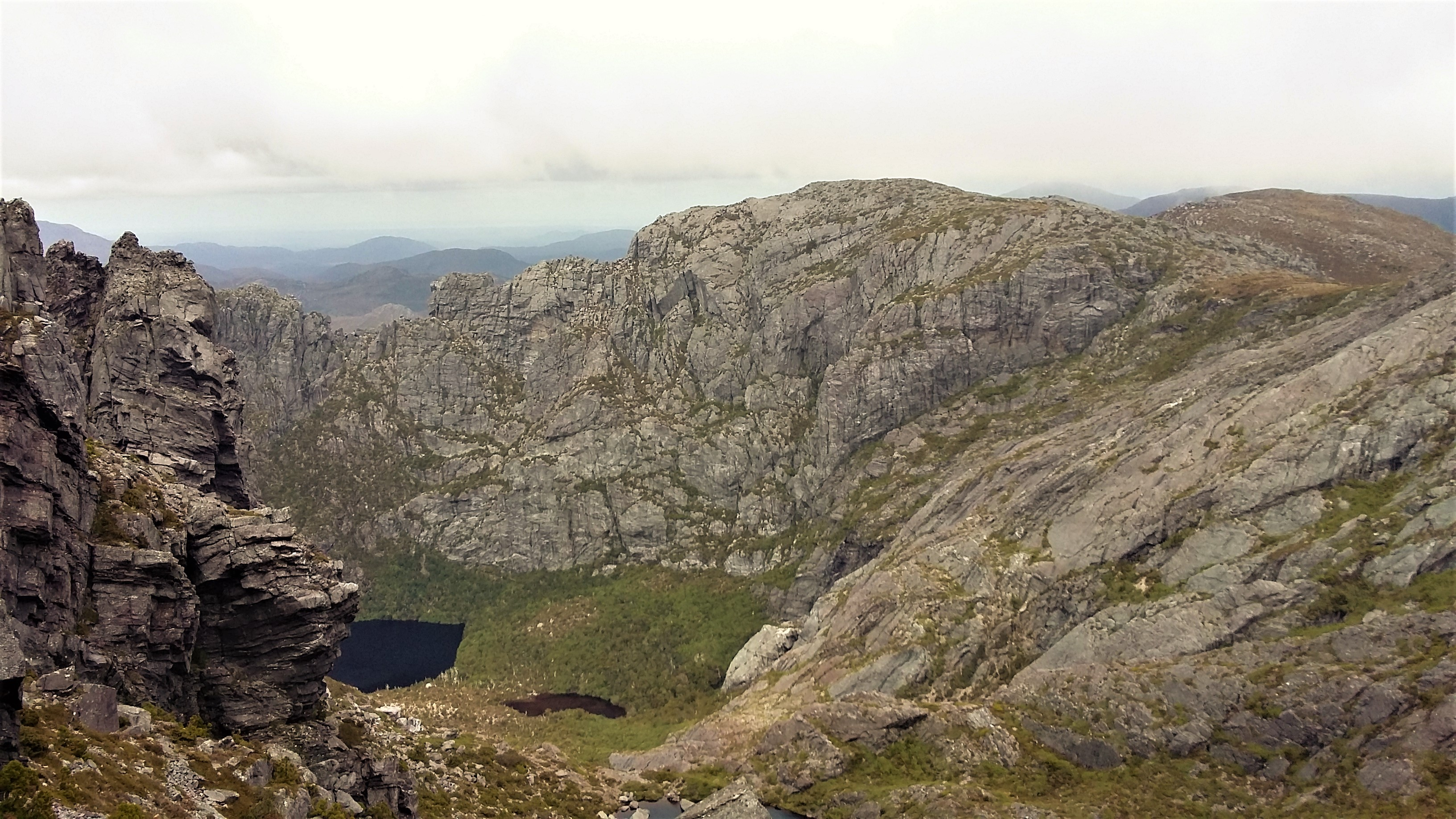
- A view over Shaded Lake near the peak of Mount Murchison

Highest point
- Elevation: 1,275 m (4,183 ft)
- Prominence: 760 m (2,490 ft)
- Isolation: 19.96 km (12.40 mi)
- Coordinates: 41°48′00″S 145°36′36″E

Geography
- Location within Tasmania
- Location: Western Tasmania, Australia
- Parent range: West Coast Range

Geology
- Rock age: Jurassic

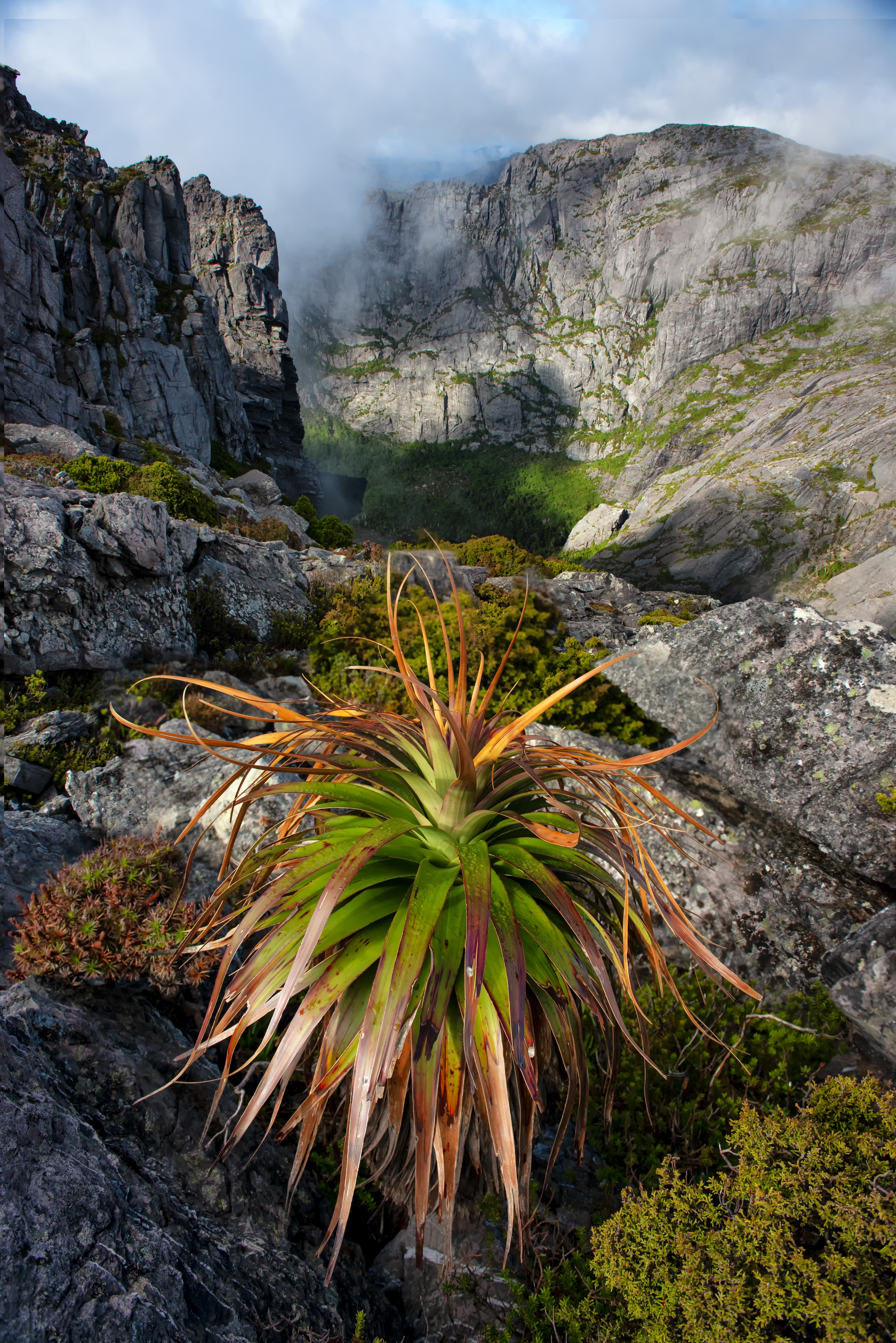
Mount Murchison, with Richea pandanifolia (foreground)

Mount Murchison is a mountain on the West Coast Range, located in the West Coast region of Tasmania, Australia.

At 1,275 metres (4,183 ft) above sea level, it is the highest mountain in the range and within the top thirty highest mountains in Tasmania.

== Location and features ==
Lying close to the Williamsford and Tullah mining areas, the mountain is often found referred to in early photographs. It is located in the Mount Murchison Regional Reserve and lies east of Zeehan, and Mount Read, and north of Mount Tyndall. The track to the summit takes approximately 2.5 hours to complete with infrequent rests. The total walk to time to the summit and return is approximately 5.5 to 6 hrs.

From the trig point the nearby Towns of Tullah, Rosebery and Zeehan can be seen on a clear day. Mount Murchison is for moderately experienced climbers and contains sections that includes loose and sometimes slippery rock.

The first part of the track winds through dense bush and involves stepping over a lot of tree roots. The track breaks from the bush straight into a view of the surrounding area. Navigation from this point onwards involves moving between rock cairns and bits of tape to ensure you are on the track. At one point on the track about a third from the top requires an ascent up a 2-metre rise. As of June 2018, the rope attached to assist at that point is still in serviceable condition.

Water is available from about two thirds up the track from snow runoff which forms a little spring.

The last third of the track across the top to get to the trig point is quite narrow and has a fall off to the right. There is also a 1.5 metre ledge to climb up on to as part of the last section of the track.

The geology of the ground around the mountain relates to the range of mining activities nearby.

On the south eastern side there a number of lakes, some unnamed. From the north, they are Shaded Lake, Little Sister, Lake Gaye and Lake Sandra lying to the east of the southernmost part of the main mountain, and below a very steep cliff.

It was named by Charles Gould in the early 1860s.

A folk tradition of unknown origin is that a cooked sausage should be thrown off the top of the mountain in order to ward off animals on the descent.

== See also ==
- List of highest mountains of Tasmania
- Lake Murchison
- Murchison River
- Murchison Highway

== Bibliography ==
- Banks, M. R.; Kirkpatrick, J. B., eds. (1977). Landscape and Man, the interaction between man and environment in Western Tasmania. Royal Society of Tasmania. ISBN 978-0959867923.
- Binks, C.J. (1980). Explorers of Western Tasmania. Launceston: Mary Fisher Bookshop. ISBN 0-908291-16-7.
- Blainey, Geoffrey (2000). The Peaks of Lyell (6th ed.). Hobart: St. David's Park Publishing. ISBN 0-7246-2265-9.
- Whitham, Charles (2003). Western Tasmania - A land of riches and beauty (Reprint 2003 ed.). Queenstown: Municipality of Queenstown.
- Whitham, Lindsay (2002). Railways, Mines, Pubs and People and other historical research. Sandy Bay: Tasmanian Historical Research Association. ISBN 0-909479-21-6.
