= Murchison Highway =

Highway in Tasmania, Australia

Murchison Highway Tasmania
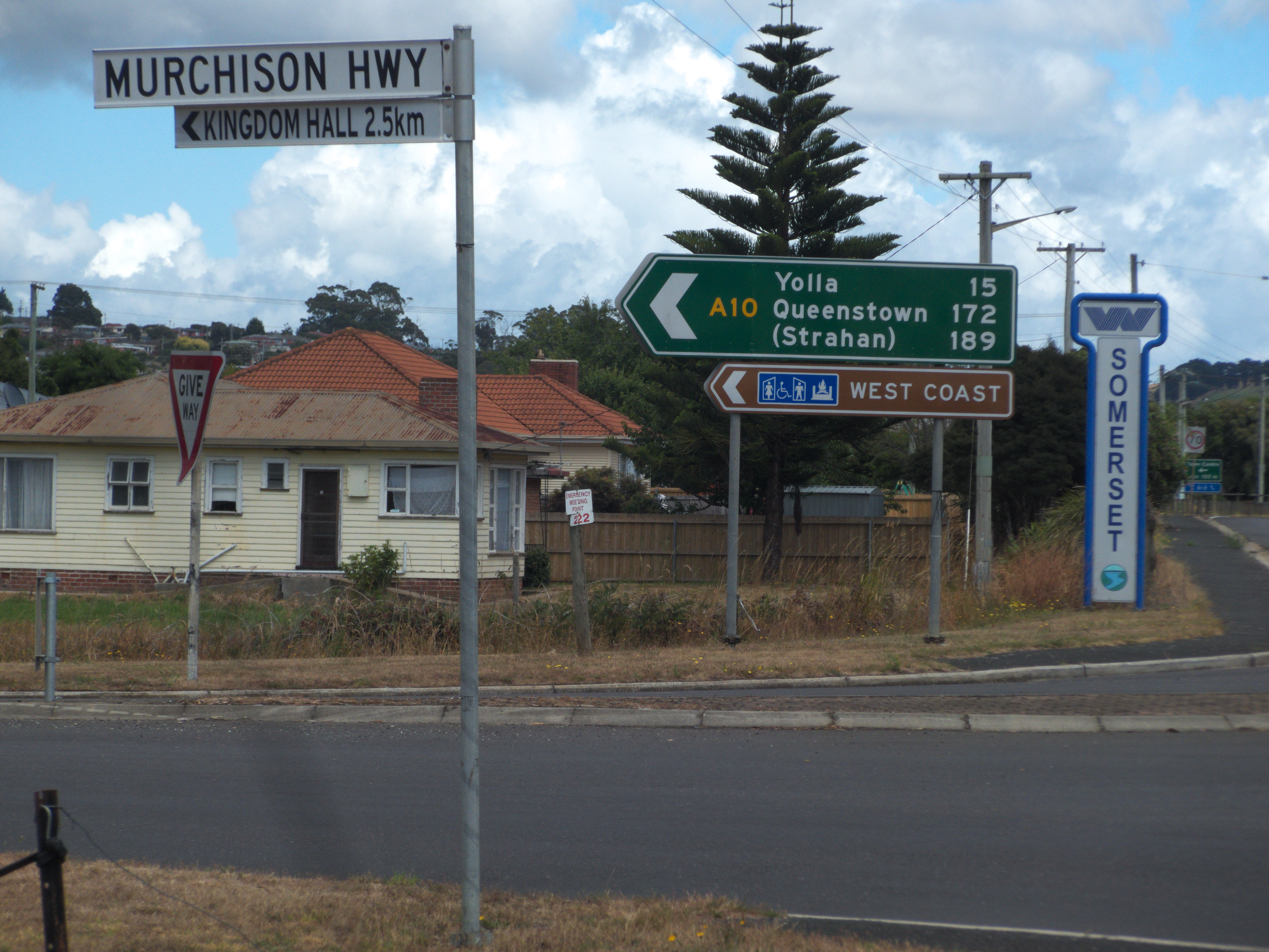
- Northern end of the Murchison Highway in Somerset.

General information
- Type: Highway
- Length: 147 km (91 mi)
- Opened: 13 December 1963
- Route number(s): A10; Zeehan — Somerset
- Former route number: State Route 8

Major junctions
- South end: Zeehan Highway; Zeehan Highway; Zeehan, Tasmania
- Anthony Road; Ridgley Highway; Waratah Road; Mount Hicks Road
- North end: Bass Highway; Somerset, Tasmania

Location(s)
- Major settlements: Rosebery, Tullah, Parrawe, Yolla

Highway system
- Highways in Australia; National Highway • Freeways in Australia; Highways in Tasmania

The Murchison Highway is a highway located in the West Coast region of Tasmania, Australia. The 147-kilometre (91 mi) highway runs generally north–south, with Somerset, near Burnie, as its northern terminus and Zeehan as its southern terminus. The highway was opened on 13 December 1963. Part of the highway from Waratah to Burnie was known as the Waratah Highway until 1973.

== Course ==
The highway is susceptible to ice and snow in winter. One of the notorious sections is at the edge of Mount Black; numerous accidents have occurred in the area. Also the Zeehan to Rosebery section has hazardous sections which can be affected by cold and wet weather.

Portions of the highway have been made redundant by extra roads built by Hydro Tasmania during their work on the upper Pieman River scheme and the Henty River dam schemes. These provide short cuts from Queenstown straight through to Tullah by going just west of the West Coast Range.

The highway crosses the Mackintosh River and the Murchison River near the town of Tullah, where the rivers form a confluence to form the Pieman River.

== History ==
Prior to the construction of the highway, the west coast of Tasmania could only be accessed by the Emu Bay Railway, or by ship to Regatta Point or Strahan in Macquarie Harbour.

== See also ==
- Highways in Australia
- List of highways in Tasmania
