= Pieman River Power Development =

Hydroelectric development on the Pieman River, Australia

Pieman River Power Development was a major 1970s and 1980s hydroelectric development of the Pieman River and its tributaries on the west coast of Tasmania.

== Development ==
The Pieman River Power Development was approved by the Tasmanian government in 1971, construction began in 1974 and it was completed in 1987.

The damming of the river was the subject of a struggle between conservation groups and Hydro Tasmania, similar to Lake Pedder . The struggle went relatively unnoticed on mainland Australia - and it was the proposed Franklin Dam issue that was to catch a much wider Australian audience, than the damming of the Pieman or King Rivers.

The development included three power stations and five dams:-

- Murchison Dam – impounded the Murchison River to form Lake Murchison;
- Tullabardine Dam and Mackintosh Dam – impounded the Mackintosh River to form Lake Mackintosh, for the generation of hydroelectricity at the Mackintosh Power Station that was commissioned in 1982;
- Bastyan Dam – impounded the Pieman River to form Lake Rosebery, for the generation of hydroelectricity at the Bastyan Power Station that was commissioned in 1983;
- Reece Dam – impounded the Pieman River to form Lake Pieman, for the generation of hydroelectricity at the Reece Power Station that was commissioned in 1986 and 1987.

=== Legacy ===
It remains Hydro Tasmania's most successfully multi-dammed catchment on the West Coast, and it was developed after the Upper Gordon Scheme (Lake Pedder) and was being completed in the era of the Franklin Dam controversy. It could be seen as the last major Power Development Scheme undertaken by the Hydro during its stage as an expanding dam-making enterprise. The King River and Henty River developments that followed required specifically challenging engineering on the part of Hydro, but were smaller projects in duration.

== See also ==
- List of power stations in Tasmania
- List of reservoirs and dams in Tasmania
- Hydro Tasmania
