= Pieman River =

River in western Tasmania, Australia

Pieman
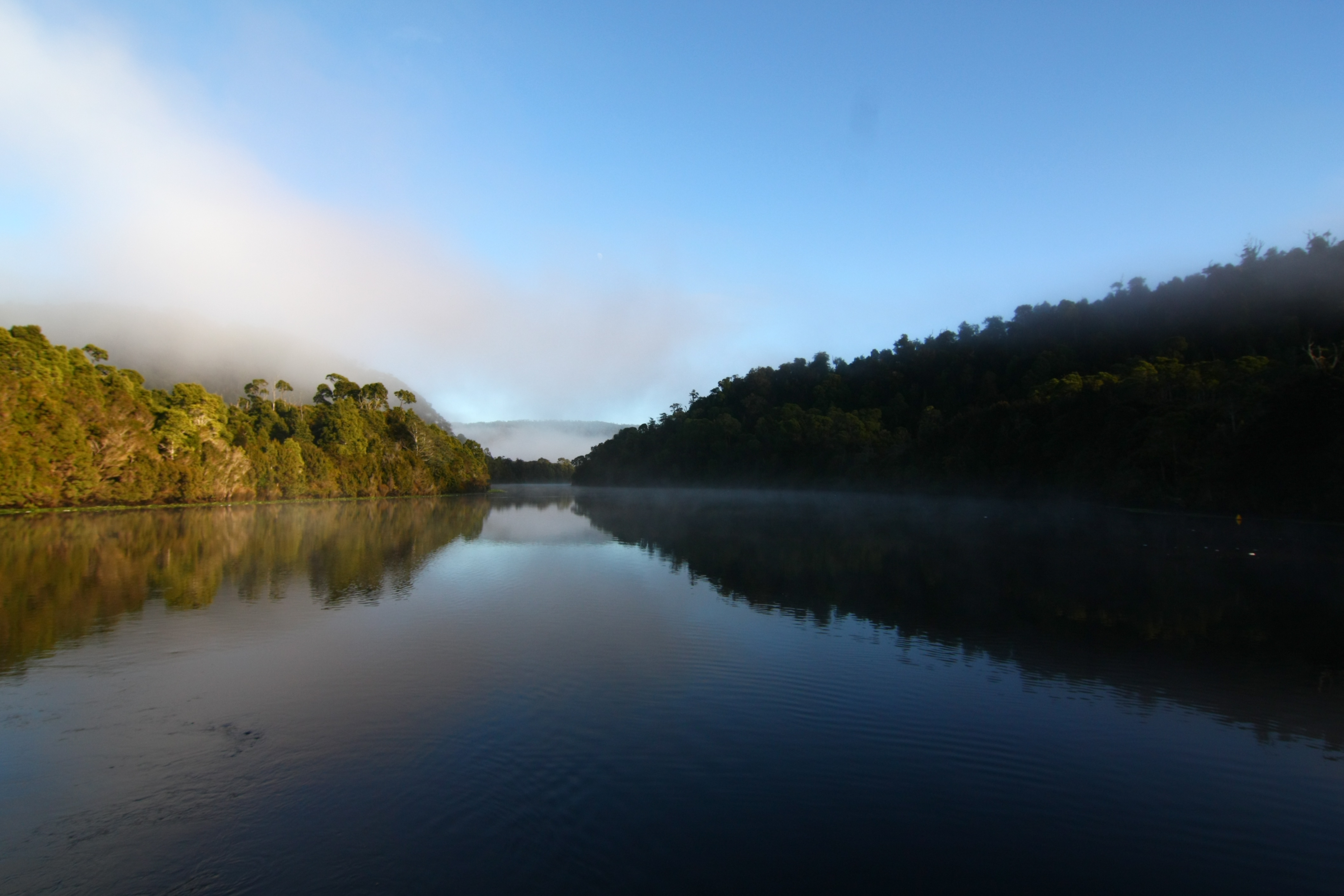
- The Pieman River

- Location of the Pieman River mouth in Tasmania
- Etymology: Thomas Kent
- Native name: Corinna (Northwestern Tasmanian)

Location
- Country: Australia
- State: Tasmania
- Region: West Coast

Physical characteristics
- Source confluence: Mackintosh River and Murchison River
  - location: below Tullah
  - elevation: 191 m (627 ft)
- Mouth: Hardwicke Bay
  - coordinates: 41°40′13″S 144°55′9″E
  - elevation: 0 m (0 ft)
- Length: 26 km (16 mi)

Basin features
- Tributaries
  - left: Ring River, Stitt River, Heemskirk River
  - right: Marionoak River, Wilson River (Tasmania), Huskisson River, Stanley River (Tasmania), Paradise River (Tasmania), Owen Meredith River, Savage River (Tasmania), Whyte River, Donaldson River (Tasmania)
- Reservoir: Lake Rosebury, Lake Pieman

The Pieman River is a major perennial river located in the west coast region of Tasmania, Australia.

== Course and features ==
Formed by the confluence of the Mackintosh River and Murchison River, the Pieman River rises in what is now known as Lake Rosebury, an artificial lake formed by the Bastyan Dam. The river flows generally west and northwest and then west again, joined by 21 tributaries including the Mackintosh, Murchison, Marionoak, Ring, Wilson, Stitt, Huskisson, Stanley, Heemskirk, Paradise, Owen Meredith, Savage, Whyte and Donaldson rivers before emptying into Hardwicke Bay and reaching its mouth in the Southern Ocean. The river descends 191 metres (627 ft) over its 100-kilometre (62 mi) course.

The river is impounded at Bastyan by the Bastyan Dam (and adjacent hydroelectric power station) to form Lake Rosebury; and at Reece by the Reece Dam (and adjacent hydroelectric power station) to form Lake Pieman. Both reservoir and power stations from part of the Hydro Tasmania-operated Pieman River Power Development. The construction of the power development scheme also altered the route of the Emu Bay Railway, and submerged a variety of rail heritage sites in the vicinity of the river, notably parts of the Wee Georgie Wood Railway or North Farrell Tramway line.

== Etymology ==
The Aboriginal Tasmanians knew the river as Corinna, which is the Peerapper word for the thylacine.

The once-common suggestion that the river's English name comes from a convict "The Pieman" Alexander Pearce who was responsible for one of the few recorded instances of cannibalism in Australia, is not correct. "The Pieman" was in fact Thomas Kent of Southampton, a pastry-cook who was transported to Van Diemen's Land in 1816. After a long series of offences in the colony, he was sent to the Macquarie Harbour Penal Station in 1822 but subsequently escaped, and was recaptured near the mouth of the river which now bears his nickname. The river has significant timber, mining and industrial heritage along its shores.

== See also ==
- List of rivers of Australia § Tasmania

== Maps ==
- "Pieman River power development map. Tourist map on orthophoto base, showing power developments, for the area Corinna-Lake Mackintosh-Trial Harbour. Includes power stations, tourist facilities, and historical notes" (cartographic material, reproduction). Survey Section. 1:60 000. Tasmania: Hydro-Electric Commission. 1982. § E 145°05'--E 145°46'/S 41°37'--S 42°00'.
