= TasRail DQ class =

Diesel locomotives

DQ class
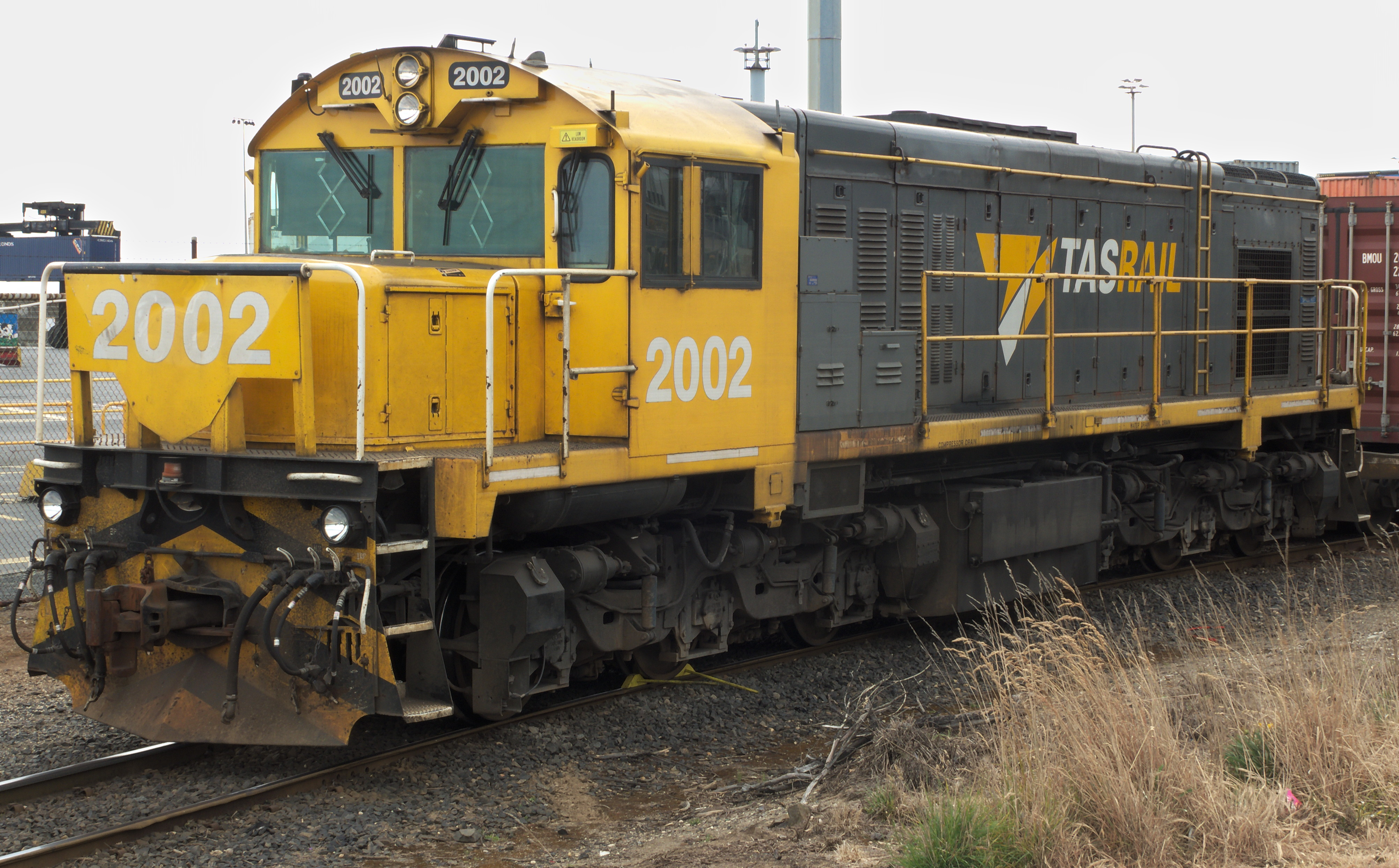
- DQ 2002 outside the Port of Burnie
Type and origin
- Power type: Diesel-electric
- Builder: Clyde Engineering, Eagle Farm
- Model: EMD G22C
- Build date: 1964–1969
- Rebuilder: Hutt Workshops
- Rebuild date: 1996–1999
- Number rebuilt: 12
Specifications
- Configuration
  - UIC: Co-Co
- Gauge: 3 ft 6 in (1,067 mm)
- Wheel diameter: 3 ft 4 in (1.016 m)
- Wheelbase: 38 ft 5 1/2 in (11.722 m) total, 12 ft 6 in (3.810 m) bogie
- Length: 49 ft 4 in (15.037 m) over headstocks
- Axle load: 15 long tons (15 t; 17 short tons)
- Loco weight: 90 long tons (91 t; 100 short tons)
- Fuel type: Diesel
- Fuel capacity: 1,100 imp gal (5,000 L)
- Prime mover: EMD 12-645E (2001–2004); EMD 12-645C (2005–2012)
- Engine type: V12 2 stroke diesel
- Generator: EMD D32T (2001–2004); EMD D25 (2005–2012)
- Traction motors: EMD D29
- Cylinders: 12
- Cylinder size: 9 1/16 in × 10 in (230 mm × 254 mm)
- MU working: 74 V, eight-notch
- Loco brake: Westinghouse 26L air brake
- Train brakes: Westinghouse 26L air brake
Performance figures
- Maximum speed: 80 km/h (50 mph)
- Power output: Gross: 1,650 hp (1,230 kW); Net: 1,500 hp (1,120 kW)
Career
- Operators: AN Tasrail; Pacific National; TasRail
- Number in class: 12
- Numbers: 2001–2012
- Delivered: 2 September 1998 to 5 October 1999
- Current owner: TasRail
- Disposition: 8 in service 3 withdrawn 1 converted to driving trailer

The DQ class were a class of diesel locomotives in New Zealand and Tasmania. Originally built by Clyde Engineering in the 1960s as Queensland Rails 1460 and 1502 class locomotives. They were purchased by Tranz Rail in October 1995 to be rebuilt, as a cheaper alternative to buying new locomotives. Tranz Rail rebuilt 16 locos into the DQ class. Tranz Rail then sold the 12 DQs to AN Tasrail. Only eight out of the twelve DQs are still in service today.

== Introduction and service ==
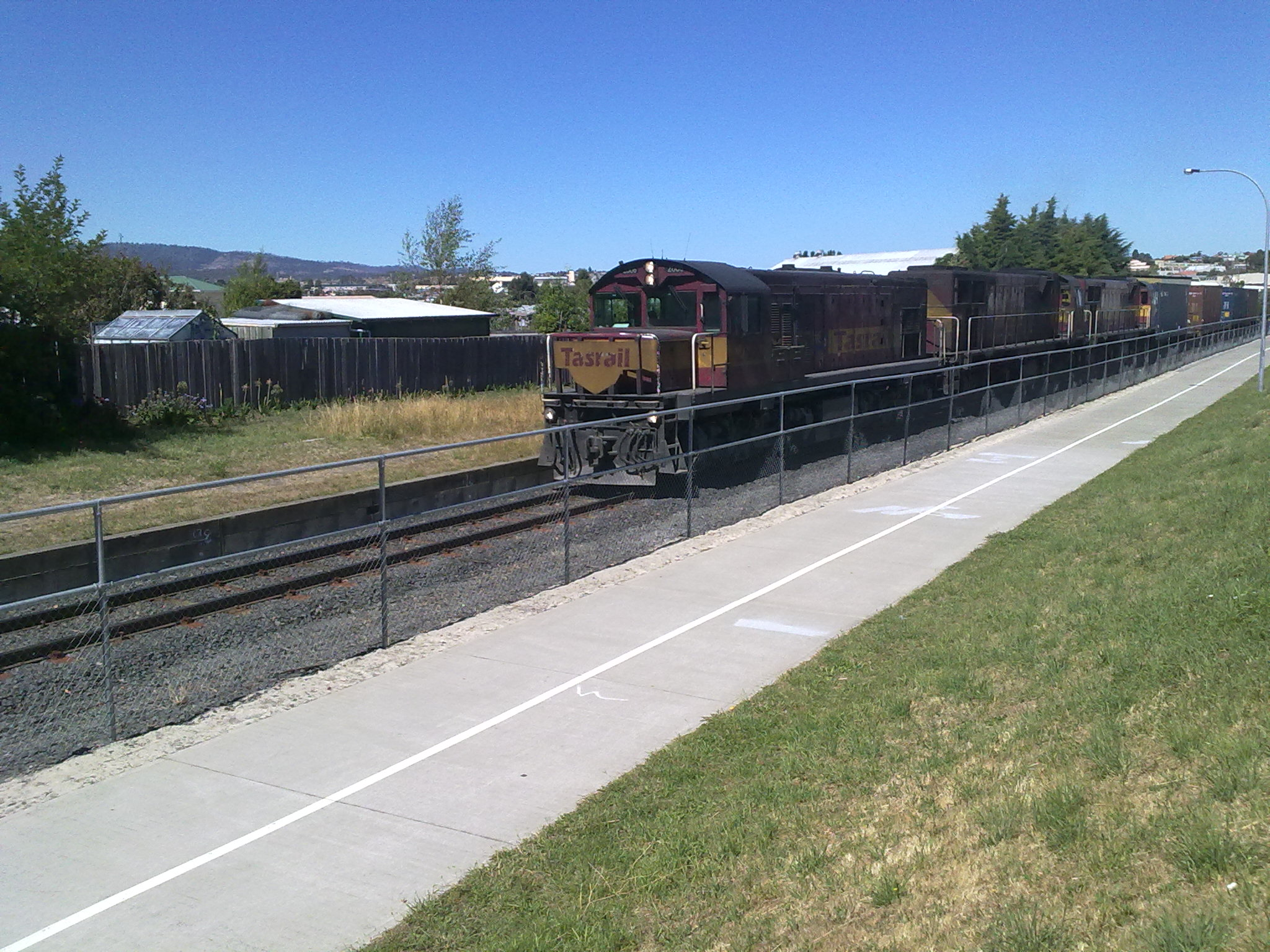
DQ 2006 leads the two D class locomotives with a freight train in at Glenorchy

Following the rebuilding of the DQ and QR class locomotives at Tranz Rails Hutt Workshops, Tranz Rail sold twelve DQs for the planned replacement of Tasrails English Electric locomotive fleet. DQs 2001 and 2002 were repainted into the ATN Red livery. Due to the Australian Transport Network not being impressed with the looks and the cost of the livery, the rest of the locomotives were repainted into the Wisconsin Central Maroon livery. With the sales of the twelve locomotives, they were renumbered in the 20XX series from the 60XX series (1502 class rebuilds) and 63XX (1460 class rebuilds), as they were in New Zealand.

On 2 September 1998, DQs 2001 and 2002 arrived in Bell Bay. After arrival, the locomotives were towed to Tasrails East Tamar Workshops for adjustments and testing, before entering service later that month. A second batch of three locomotives arrived on 16 December 1998, with the third batch arriving on 3 March 1999. The last batched arrived on 5 October 1999. The locomotives have had a high number of main generator failures, since their arrivals. Reductions in rated haulage capacity in recent years have reduced the number of in service failures and train operating problems. The locomotives have also had vibration issues in Tasmania, and well as in New Zealand since being rebuilt. The locomotives were later sold to AN Tasrail.

With Pacific National selling the Tasmanian railway system to TasRail, six locomotives have been repainted into the new grey and yellow livery. DQ 2001, which had just been reassembled, became the first loco to carry the new livery in August 2010. Two DQs are carrying special advertising panels, in-place of TasRails logo. 2006 carries a level crossing safety advertisement, while 2012 carries logos commemorating the 75th anniversary of the Rosebery Mine.

== Withdrawals ==
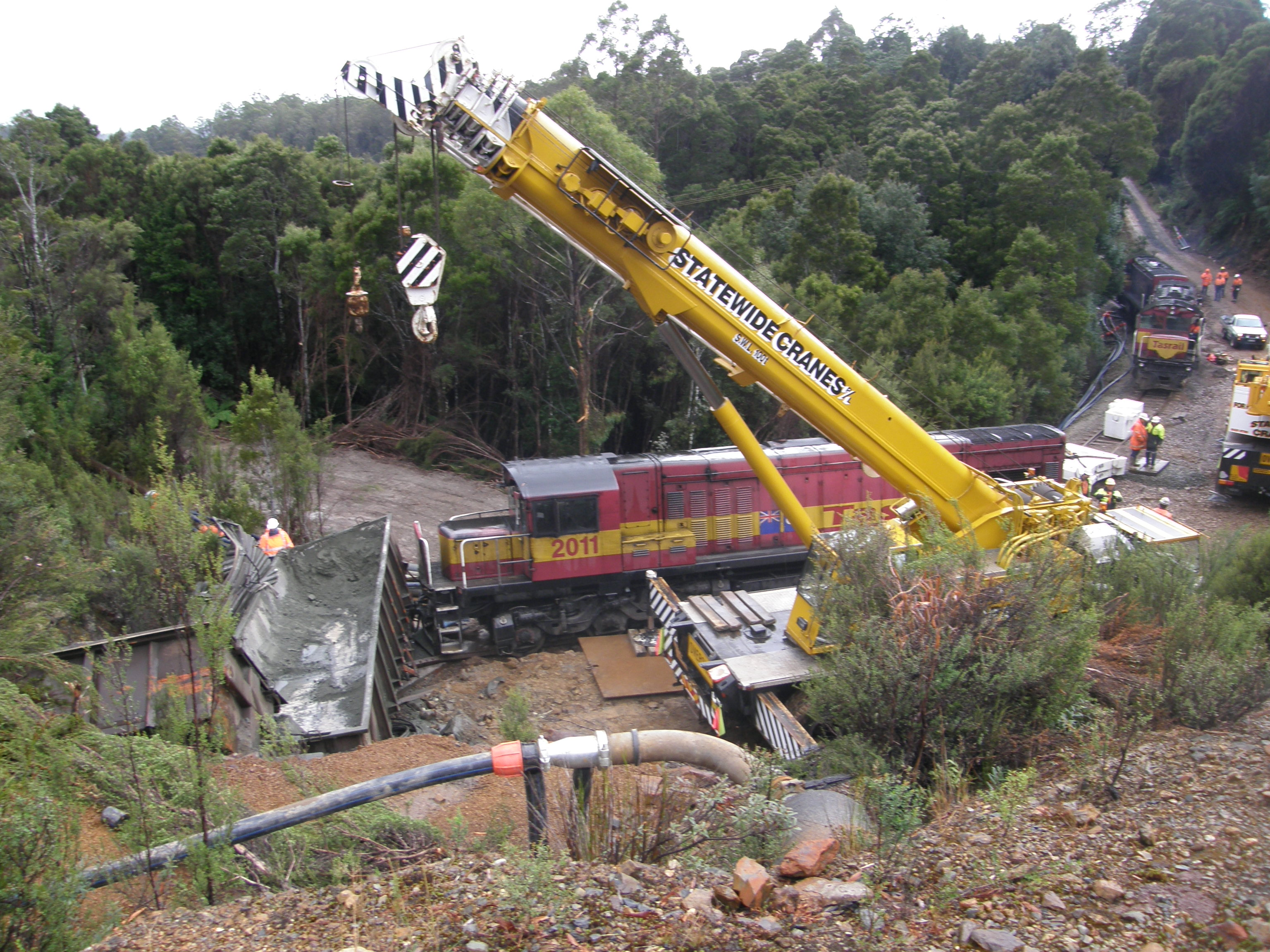
DQ 2011 after a derailment on the Melba Line in April 2009.

Due to the introduction of the TR class, DQs 2003, 2004, 2005, 2007 and 2008 were withdrawn from service, and would require heavy overhauls and other work before being available for use. with the rest to follow. By late 2015, with the failure of the TR class to be able to operate on the Melba Line, the serviceable DQs were forced to continue on Melba Line services. They also remained in use as yard shunters in Burnie and Devonport. The poorer than expected availability on the TRs has seen DQs make occasional trips east/south. DQ 2008 has been reinstated to cover locomotive shortages. In 2017, it was confirmed that DQ 2007 would be converted into a driving trailer for the Railton to Devonport cement trains to replace DV 1. In mid-2019, 2007 was converted and re-numbered DV2, replacing DV1 (Y7).

== See also ==
- New Zealand DQ and QR class locomotives
- Queensland Railways 1460 class
- Queensland Railways 1502 class
