= DQ class =

DQ class may refer to:

- New Zealand DQ class locomotive, diesel-electric locomotives
- TasRail DQ class, diesel-electric locomotives
