= TasRail QR class =

Diesel locomotives

QR class
Type and origin
- Power type: Diesel-electric
- Builder: Clyde Engineering, Eagle Farm
- Model: EMD G22C
- Build date: 1965–1966
- Rebuilder: Hutt Workshops
- Rebuild date: 1997–1999
- Number rebuilt: 6
Specifications
- Configuration
  - UIC: Co-Co
- Gauge: 1,067 mm (3 ft 6 in)
- Wheelbase: 13.55 m (44 ft 5 in) between bogies 2.58 m (8 ft 6 in) between axles in each bogie
- Length: 15.04 m (49 ft 4 in)
- Loco weight: 91.4 tonnes (90.0 long tons; 100.8 short tons)
- Fuel type: Diesel
- Fuel capacity: 4,090 litres (900 imp gal; 1,080 US gal)
- Prime mover: EMD 12-567C
- Engine type: V12 2-stroke diesel
- Generator: EMD D25 or D32T
- Traction motors: EMD D29
- Cylinders: 12
- Loco brake: Hand brakes/Westinghouse 26L air brake
- Train brakes: Westinghouse 26L air brake
Performance figures
- Maximum speed: 80 km/h (50 mph)
- Power output: 980 kW (1,310 hp)
- Tractive effort: 1,065 kW (1,428 hp)
Career
- Operators: AN Tasrail; Pacific National; TasRail
- Number in class: 3
- Numbers: 2056–2062, 2102
- Delivered: 16 December 1998
- First run: 26 January 1999
- Last run: November 2009
- Retired: 2009
- Withdrawn: July 1999 – November 2009
- Scrapped: 2012
- Disposition: All scrapped

The QR class were a class of diesel locomotives in New Zealand and Tasmania. Originally built by Clyde Engineering between 1965 and 1966 as Queensland Rail's 1460 class locomotives. They were purchased by Tranz Rail in 1995 to be rebuilt, as a cheaper alternative to buying new locomotives. Seven were modified into the QR class. Three were leased to AN Tasrail for one year, but the locos were later sold in 2001. All three have since been scrapped.

== Introduction and service ==
Following the rebuilding of the DQ and QR class locomotives at Tranz Rails Hutt Workshops, Tranz Rail sold three QRs accompanied the second batch of DQ class locomotives due to a locomotive shortage due to the planned replacement of Tasrails English Electric locomotive fleet. The locos left the Port of Wellington on 8 December 1998 on the Arktis Dream, and arrived in Bell Bay on 15 December 1998. They were still painted in the Cato Blue livery, still with Tranz Rails winged logo still painted on. The logo was later modified with "Tranz Rail" being replaced by "Tasrail". The locos were used as slave units only (as they were in New Zealand) due to lacking of the radio and other equipment as what are fitted to other lead locomotives. The locomotives were also occasionally used for yard shunts.

== Withdrawal and disposal ==
As of April 2017, all three locomotives have been scrapped. The three locomotives never saw much service in the first few years, with QR's 2062 and 2102 being placed into storage within the first year of service, with QR 2056 following not long after. The three later returned to service. QR 2102 withdrawn after a major engine failure in July 2002. QR 2056 was again withdrawn in August 2005. By 2008, only QR 2062 remained in service. The locomotive was generally on the Melba Line, but it was occasionally used on the South Line. This locomotive was withdrawn by November 2009. The locomotives were all stored at East Tamar Workshops after their withdrawals. The locomotives were then transported to One Steel's scrap yard in Bell Bay in June 2012, where they were scrapped in a couple of months later.

== See also ==
- New Zealand DQ and QR class locomotives
- Queensland Railways 1460 class
