= QR class =

QR class may refer to:

- New Zealand QR class locomotive, diesel-electric locomotives
- TasRail QR class, diesel-electric locomotives
