= Queensland Railways 1502 class =

Australian diesel-electric locomotives

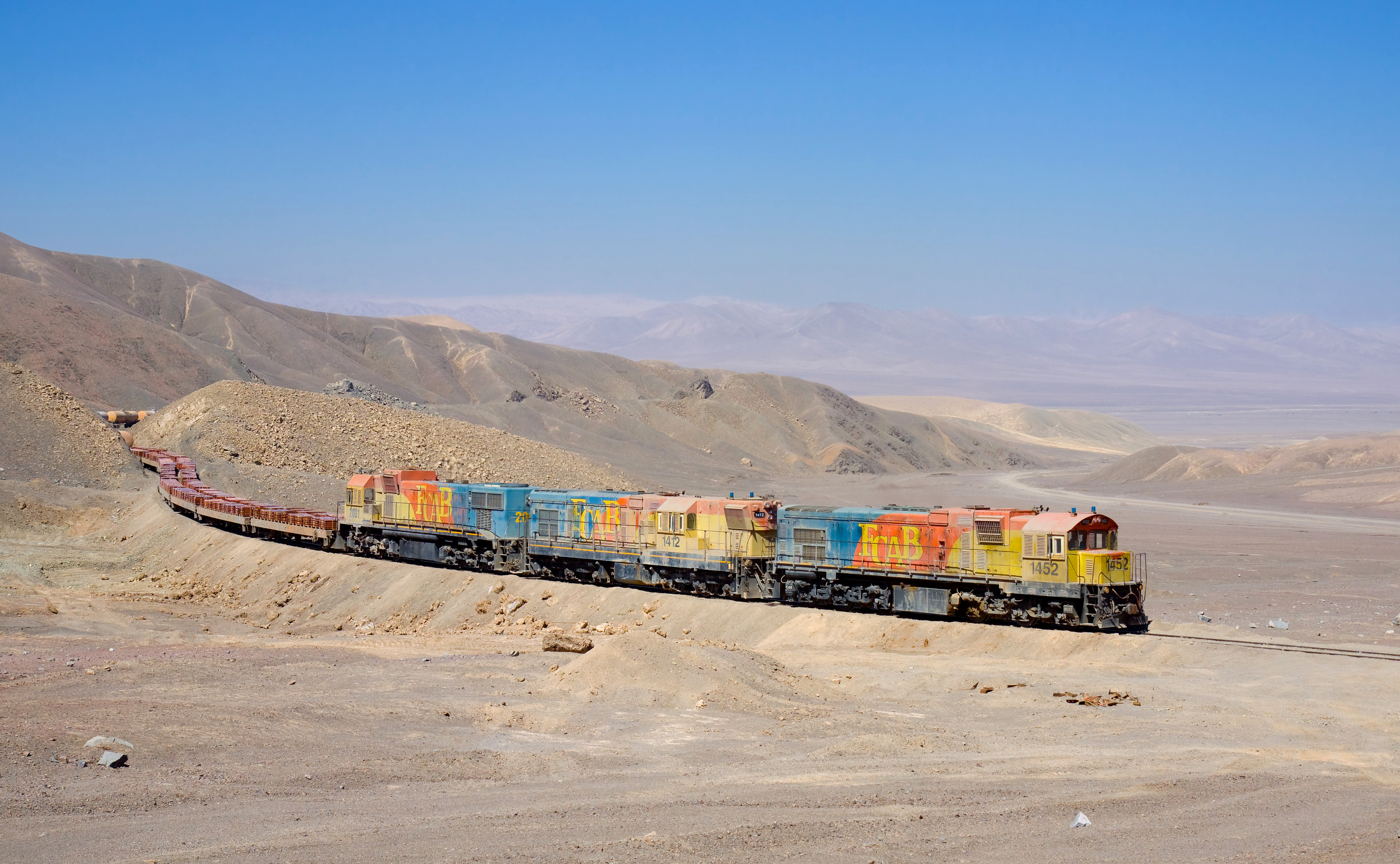
- Former 1506 operating for Ferrocarril de Antofagasta a Bolivia in April 2012
Type and origin
- Power type: Diesel-electric
- Builder: Clyde Engineering, Eagle Farm
- Model: Electro-Motive Diesel G22C
- Build date: 1967-1969
- Total produced: 29
- Rebuilder: Hutt Workshops
- Rebuild date: 1996-1998
- Number rebuilt: 4
Specifications
- Configuration
  - UIC: Co-Co
- Gauge: 1,067 mm (3 ft 6 in)
- Length: 16.26 metres (53 ft 4 in)
- Loco weight: 91.4 tonnes (90.0 long tons; 100.8 short tons)
- Fuel type: Diesel
- Fuel capacity: 6,364 litres (1,400 imp gal; 1,681 US gal)
- Prime mover: Electro-Motive Diesel 645E
- Engine type: V12 Diesel engine
- Generator: Electro-Motive Diesel D32
- Traction motors: Electro-Motive Diesel D29
- Cylinders: 12
- Cylinder size: (?)
Performance figures
- Maximum speed: 112 km/h (70 mph)
- Tractive effort: 1,119 kW (1,501 hp)
Career
- Operators: Queensland Rail
- Number in class: 29
- Numbers: 1502-1530
- Delivered: October 1967
- Current owner: TasRail; Ferrocarril de Antofagasta a Bolivia; QR National; Interail; Australian Railroad Group
- Disposition: 11 in service, 17 stored, 2 scrapped

The 1502 class was a class of diesel locomotives built by Clyde Engineering, Eagle Farm for Queensland Railways between 1967 and 1969.

== History ==
The 1502 class was an evolution of the 1460 class fitted with a more powerful Electro-Motive Diesel 645E engine and upgraded generators and traction motors. They operated services in South East Queensland including suburban trains in Brisbane.

In 1996, four were sold to Tranz Rail in New Zealand. After rebuilding at Hutt Workshops, they were placed in service with the Australian Transport Network in Tasmania as the DQ2000 class.

All had been withdrawn by 1999. In 2002, six were overhauled and fitted with 1,435 mm (4 ft 8 1/2 in) standard gauge bogies from FreightCorp 49 class locomotives for use by Interail in New South Wales as the 423 class.

In 2005, seven have been exported to Ferrocarril de Antofagasta a Bolivia, Chile. In 2006, two were rebuilt and transferred to Australian Railroad Group for use in Western Australia as the AD class.

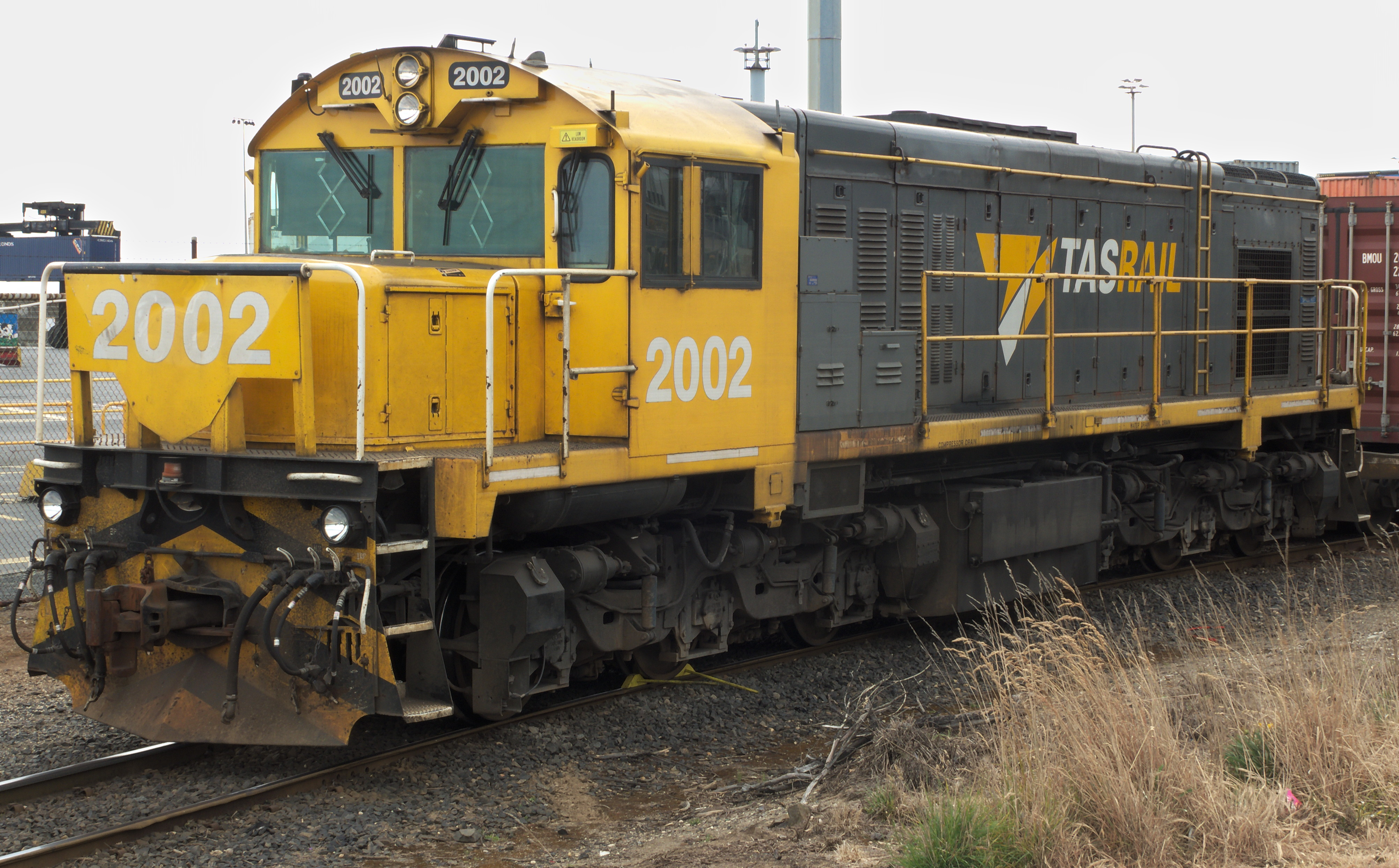
Tasrail 2002 in 2015.

== Class register ==
Number	Introduced	Withdrawn	Status/Notes
1502	October 1967	2015	Modified by Tranz Rail as QR 3032. Operated by Tasrail in Tasmania as DQ 2004. Now withdrawn.
1503	October 1967	2011	Now scrapped.
1504	November 1967	June 2011	Rebuilt as 42301 for Interail. Now withdrawn.
1505	December 1967	1999	Now scrapped in 2011
1506	December 1967		Now rebuilt and operated by FCAB in Chile as their No. 1452.
1507	December 1967	June 2011	Rebuilt as 42302 for Interail. Now withdrawn.
1508	December 1967	2015	Rebuilt by Tranz Rail as DQ 6036. Operated by TasRail in Tasmania as DQ 2003. Now withdrawn.
1509	January 1968	1999	Now stored in Antofagasta
1510	February 1968	1999	Now stored in Antofagasta.
1511	March 1968	1999	Now stored in Antofagasta.
1512	December 1967		Now rebuilt and operated by FCAB in Chile as their No. 1456.
1513	April 1968		Rebuilt by the Australian Railroad Group in Western Australia as AD 1520. Now owned by APEX Industrial and shipped to South Africa.
1514	April 1968		Rebuilt by the Australian Railroad Group in Western Australia as AD 1521. Now owned by APEX Industrial and shipped to South Africa.
1515	April 1968	1999	Now stored in Antofagasta.
1516	May 1968	1999	Now stored in Antofagasta.
1517	May 1968		Now rebuilt and operated by FCAB in Chile as their No. 1454.
1518	May 1968	June 2011	Rebuilt as 42303 for Interail. Now withdrawn.
1519	June 1968		Now rebuilt and operated by FCAB in Chile as their No. 1457.
1520	June 1968	June 2011	Rebuilt as 42306 for QR National. Now withdrawn.
1521	July 1968		Rebuilt by Tranz Rail as DQ 15215. Later renumbered as DQ 6007. Operated by TasRail in Tasmania as DQ 2001.
1522	November 1968		Rebuilt by Tranz Rail as DQ 6013. Operated by TasRail in Tasmania as DQ 2002.
1523	November 1968		Now rebuilt and operated by FCAB in Chile as their No. 1455.
1524	December 1968	June 2011	Rebuilt as 42304 for Interail. Now withdrawn.
1525	February 1969		Now rebuilt and operated by FCAB in Chile as their No. 1453.
1526	February 1969	June 2011	Rebuilt as 42305 for QR National. Now withdrawn.
1527	May 1969	1999	Now stored in Antofagasta.
1528	June 1969	1999	Now stored in Antofagasta.
1529	July 1969	1999	Now Stored in Antofagasta
1530	August 1969		Now rebuilt and operated by FCAB in Chile as their No. 1458.

== See also ==
- New Zealand DQ and QR class locomotives
