= Queensland Railways 1300 class =

Australian diesel-electric locomotives

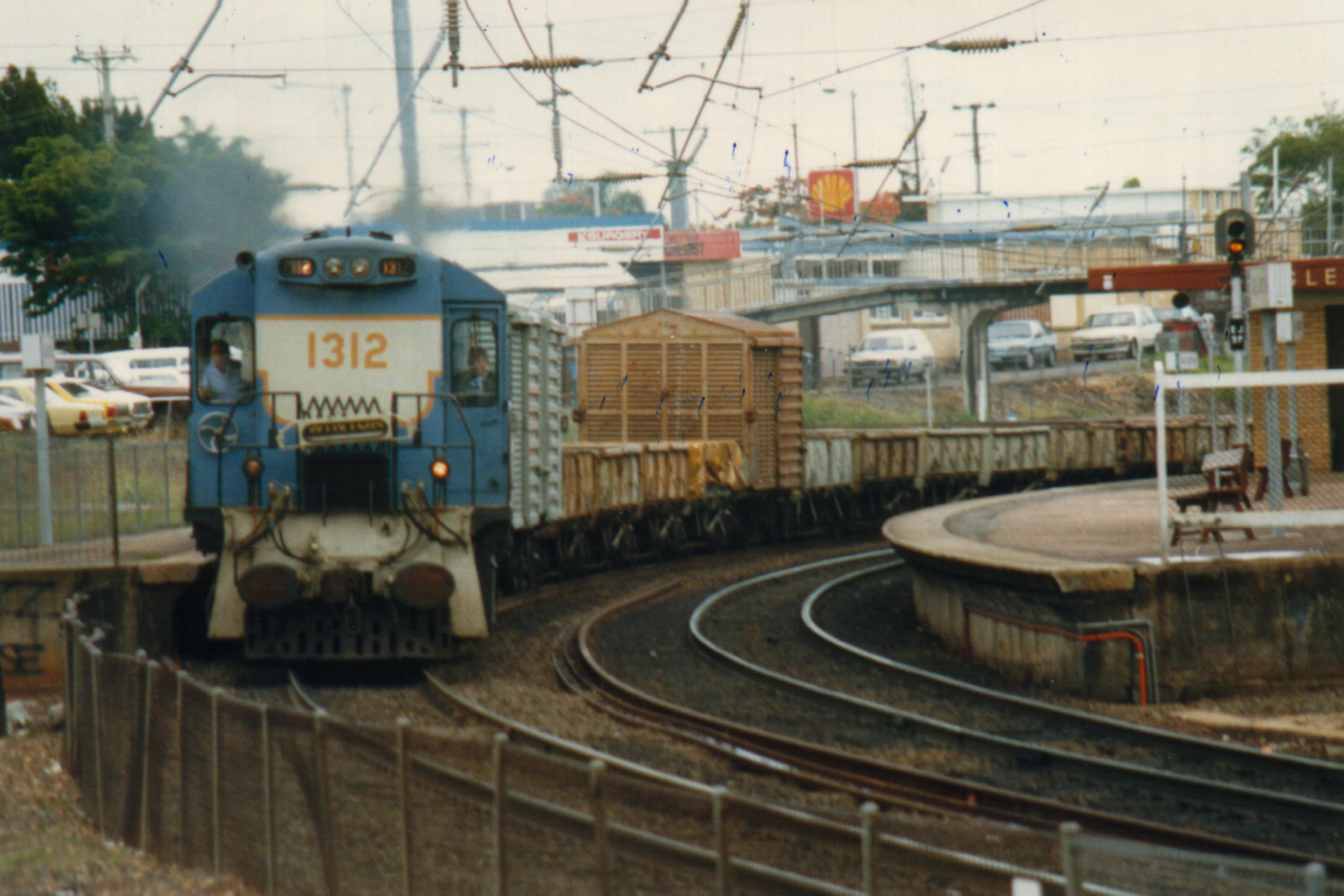
- 1312 at Eagle Junction station in December 1986
Type and origin
- Power type: Diesel-electric
- Builder: English Electric, Rocklea
- Build date: 1967–1972
- Total produced: 45
Specifications
- Configuration
  - Commonwealth: Co-Co
- Gauge: 1,067 mm (3 ft 6 in)
- Wheel diameter: 3 ft 1 1/2 in (0.953 m)
- Wheelbase: 38 ft (11.582 m) total, 11 ft 10 1/2 in (3.620 m) bogie
- Length: 48 ft (14.630 m) over headstocks
- Width: 9 ft 3 in (2.819 m)
- Height: 12 ft 4 1/2 in (3.772 m) over cab
- Axle load: 15 long tons (15.2 t; 16.8 short tons)
- Loco weight: 88.4 long tons (89.8 t; 99.0 short tons)
- Fuel type: Diesel
- Fuel capacity: 1,000 imp gal (4,500 L) (1300-1319)
- Prime mover: English Electric 12CSVT Mk II
- RPM range: 850rpm max
- Engine type: four stroke, four valves per cylinder
- Aspiration: turbocharged, intercooled
- Generator: English Electric 822/16J
- Traction motors: English Electric 548
- Cylinders: 12 Vee
- Cylinder size: 10 in × 12 in (254 mm × 305 mm)
- MU working: 110V, stepless electro-pneumatic throttle
- Loco brake: Air, dynamic
- Train brakes: Air
Performance figures
- Maximum speed: 50 miles per hour (80 km/h)
- Power output: 1,950 hp (1,450 kW) gross, 1,800 hp (1,340 kW) net
- Tractive effort: 60,000 lbf (266.9 kN)
Career
- Operators: Queensland Railways
- Number in class: 45
- Numbers: 1300–1344
- First run: 9 October 1967
- Preserved: 1318
- Disposition: 6 stored, 1 preserved, 4 exported, 35 scrapped

The 1300 class were a class of diesel locomotive built by English Electric, Rocklea for Queensland Railways between 1967 and 1972. They were later sold to AN Tasrail.

== History ==
The 1300 class was an upgraded version of the 1270 class with more powerful engines and larger fuel tanks.

The class was primarily used on the Blackwater and Moura coal lines and based at Gladstone. The class became surplus following electrification of the coal lines in 1986–1987.

In 1988, the entire class was sold to AN Tasrail where they became the ZC class. They were renumbered consecutively, 1300 becoming ZC1 and 1344 becoming ZC45, although 12 units were only used as a source of spare parts. Most had very short working lives with just 13 remaining in service by 1995 and only six by 1997.

Ten of the ZC class were sold to Morrison Knudsen Australia in April 1994, with eight rebuilt with new cabs as the MKA class at its Whyalla factory. Two were operated on the BHP Whyalla Steelworks network from February 1995, before being exported to Senegal. MKA1-4 saw service in Malaysia before returning to Australia. These along with the unused two were purchased by Pacific National in 2004 with MKA1-3 returning to Queensland and the others to Tasmania. By 2007, all six were in service in Tasmania renumbered in the 2130 series.

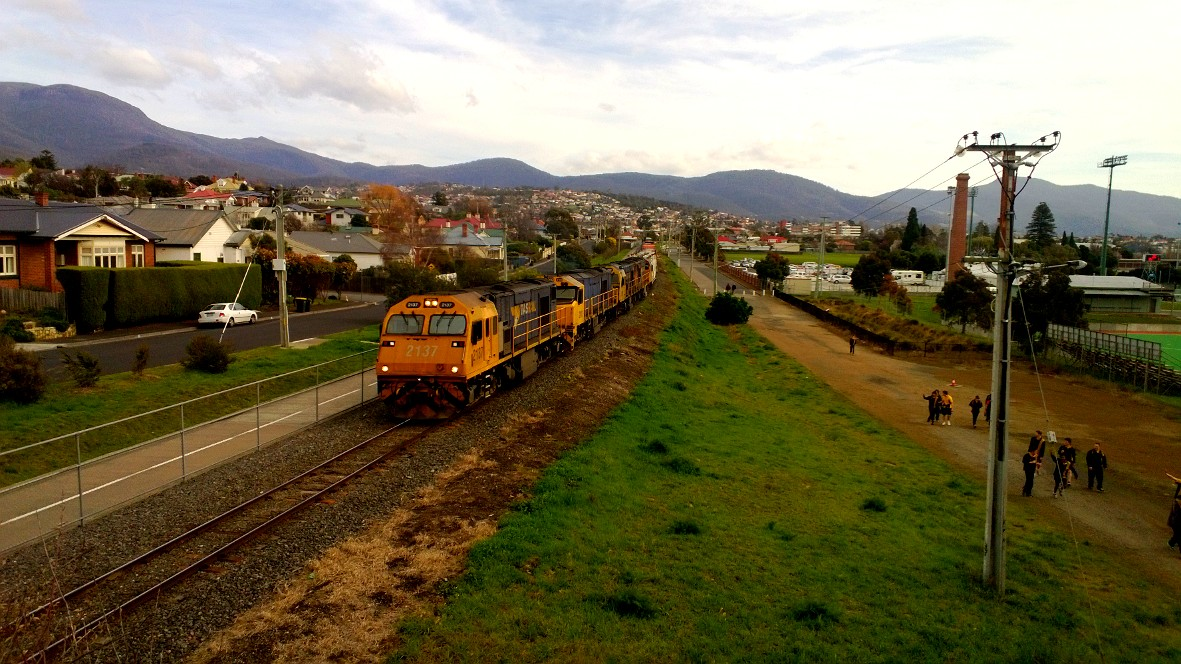
TasRail 2137 near Cornelian Bay in August 2013

With the privatisation of Australian National, AN Tasrail was sold to the Australian Transport Network, with the seven remaining ZCs becoming the 2140 class. Most stored units were scrapped and the last was withdrawn in 2004. In February 2004, Pacific National purchased Australian Transport Network, including four stored 2140 class locomotives. Chicago Freight Car Leasing Australia purchased 2142 and 2143 for a proposed tourist service, they were later rebuilt with lowered noses on the No. 1 end, repainted orange and sold to Senegal. Their current status is unknown. In September 2009, TasRail was sold back to the Government of Tasmania. TasRail sold three of the remaining stored locos for scrap in 2012 and donated 2144 (formerly ZC19 and 1318) to Diesel Traction Tasmania, now known as Launceston & North East Railway, for preservation.

ZC 19 was preservation in May 2021 after being trucked to L&NER’s Lilydale yard. A week shy of ZC 19’s ten year anniversary of its donation by TasRail. MKA8 would be donated to the L&NER in February 2024.

== Fleet summary ==
Key:	In Service	Withdrawn	Preserved	Scrapped

QR number	Serial number	In service	Withdrawn by QR	ANR number	MKA number	ATN/PN/TasRail number	Withdrawn	Scrapped	Notes
1300	A.162	9 October 1967	3 November 1988	ZC1					
1301	A.163	1 November 1967	2 August 1988						
1302	A.164								
1303	A.162								
1304	A.168			ZC5					
1305	A.170			ZC6					
1306	A.172			ZC7					
1307	A.175			ZC8					
1308	A.176			ZC9		2140		2012	
1309	A.177			ZC10					
1310	A.181			ZC11		2141		2012	
1311	A.183								
1312	A.185			ZC13					
1313	A.188			ZC14					
1314	A.189			ZC15					
1315	A.192			ZC16					
1316	A.195			ZC17		2142			
1317	A.198					2143			
1318	A.201			ZC19		2144			To Diesel Traction Tasmania. Now Launceston & North East Railway
1319	A.200			ZC20		2145		2012	
1320	A.208			ZC21	MKA4	2134			
1321	A.209			ZC22	MKA6				Exported to Senegal.
1322	A.210								
1323	A.211			ZC24					
1324	A.212								
1325	A.213			ZC26	MKA3	2133			
1326	A.214			ZC27	MKA7	2137			
1327	A.215			ZC28					
1328	A.216			ZC29					
1329	A.217				MKA2	2132			
1330	A.223			ZC31	MKA8	2138			
1331	A.224			ZC32					
1332	A.225				MKA1	2131			
1333	A.226			ZC34					
1334	A.227			ZC35					
1335	A.228								
1336	A.229			ZC37					
1337	A.230			ZC38					
1338	A.231			ZC39					
1339	A.233								
1340	A.234			ZC41	MKA5				Exported to Senegal.
1341	A.235			ZC42		2146		2012	
1342	A.245			ZC43					
1343	A.246			ZC44					
1344	A.247			ZC45					
