= Pacific National =

Australian rail transport company

Pacific National Pty Ltd

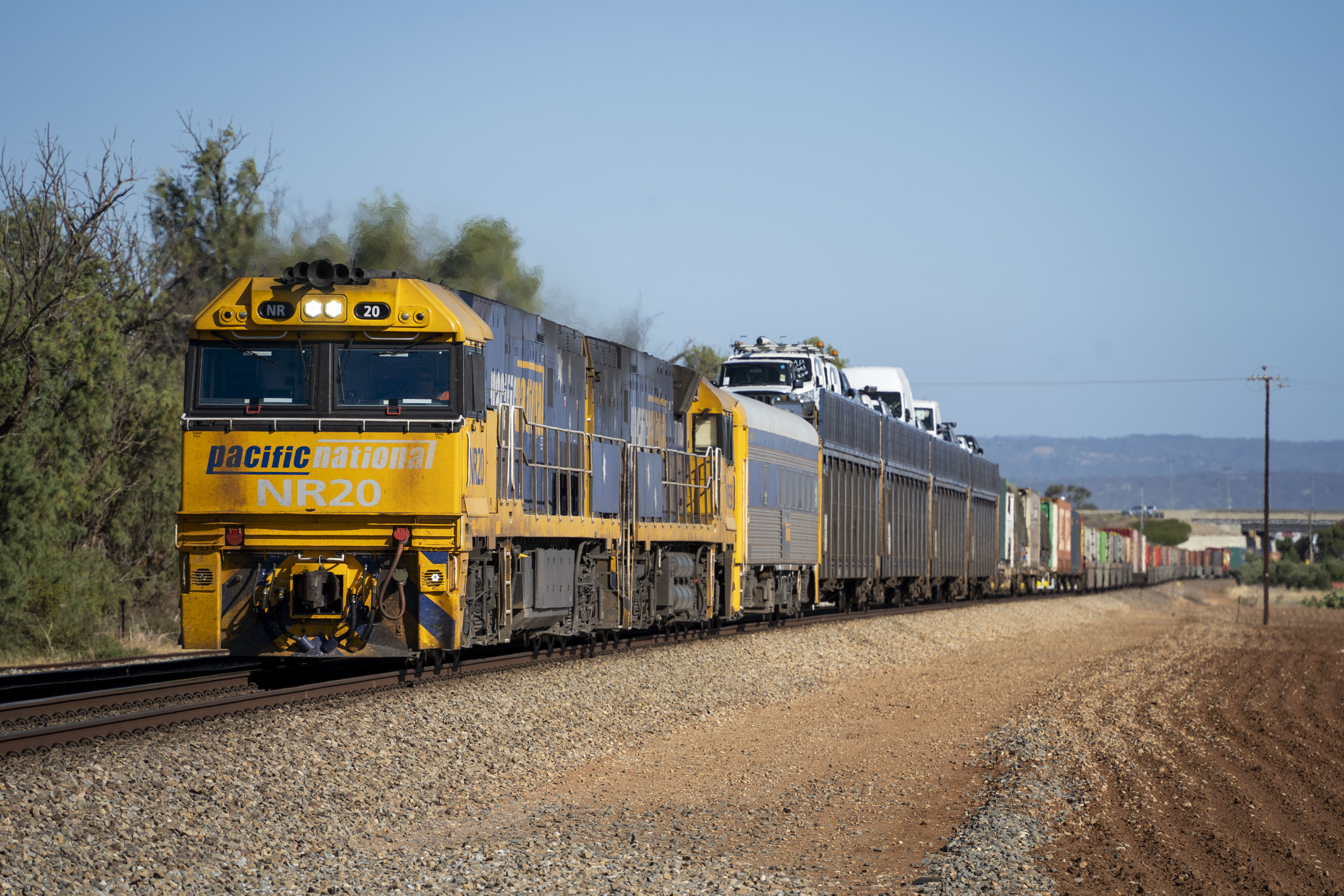
- Pacific National freight train passing through Virginia, South Australia in November 2024
- Type: Private
- Industry: Rail transport
- Predecessor: FreightCorp; National Rail
- Founded: February 2002
- Headquarters: Sydney, Australia
- Area served: Mainland Australia
- Services: Rail haulage services
- Revenue: ▼ A$2,378 million (June 2017)
- Operating income: ▼ A$443 million (June 2017)
- Net income: ▼ A$260 million (June 2017)
- Total assets: ▼ A$5,220 million (June 2017); 596 locomotives and 12,875 wagons (June 2012)
- Total equity: ▼ A$1,274 million (June 2017)
- Owner: Global Infrastructure Partners, CPP Investment Board, China Investment Corporation, GIC Private Limited and British Columbia Investment Management Corporation
- Number of employees: Approximately 4,000
- Divisions: Bulk, Coal, Intermodal and Steel
- Website: www.pacificnational.com.au

Pacific National is Australia's largest private rail freight operator. It was formed in 2002, and is operated by the consortium Australian Logistics Acquisition Investments Pty Ltd. It was previously operated by Toll Holdings before 2016 and Toll and Patrick Corporation before 2005. The rail operator was formed as an amalgamation of FreightCorp and National Rail's freight operations, and later acquired Australian Transport Network. Pacific National has since sold off some of its assets to national and other private operators. It operates services in all mainland Australian states and territories. As of June 2012, the company operates 596 locomotives and 12,875 wagons.

== History ==
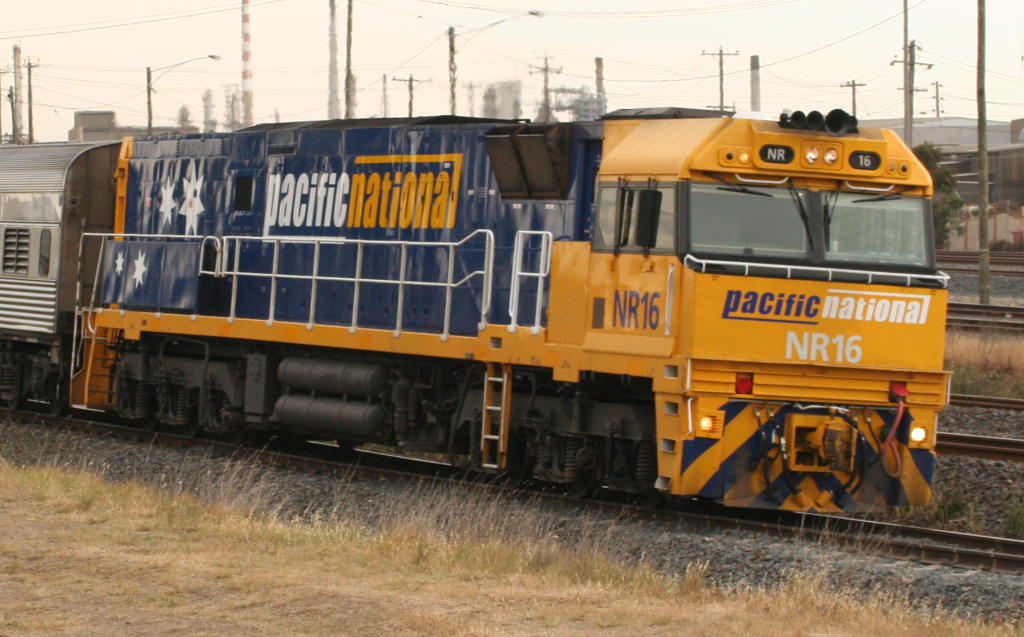
NR16 hauling The Overland at North Shore, November 2008

=== Formation and ATN acquisition ===
In February 2002, National Rail's freight operations and rollingstock, jointly owned by the Federal, New South Wales and Victorian Governments, were combined with FreightCorp, owned by the New South Wales Government, and sold to a joint venture between Patrick Corporation and Toll Holdings, trading as Pacific National.

In February 2004, Pacific National purchased Australian Transport Network, operator of ATN Access and AN Tasrail. In August 2004, Pacific National purchased Freight Australia, giving Pacific National control of the Victorian non-urban rail track, excluding the interstate network which is controlled by the Australian Rail Track Corporation.

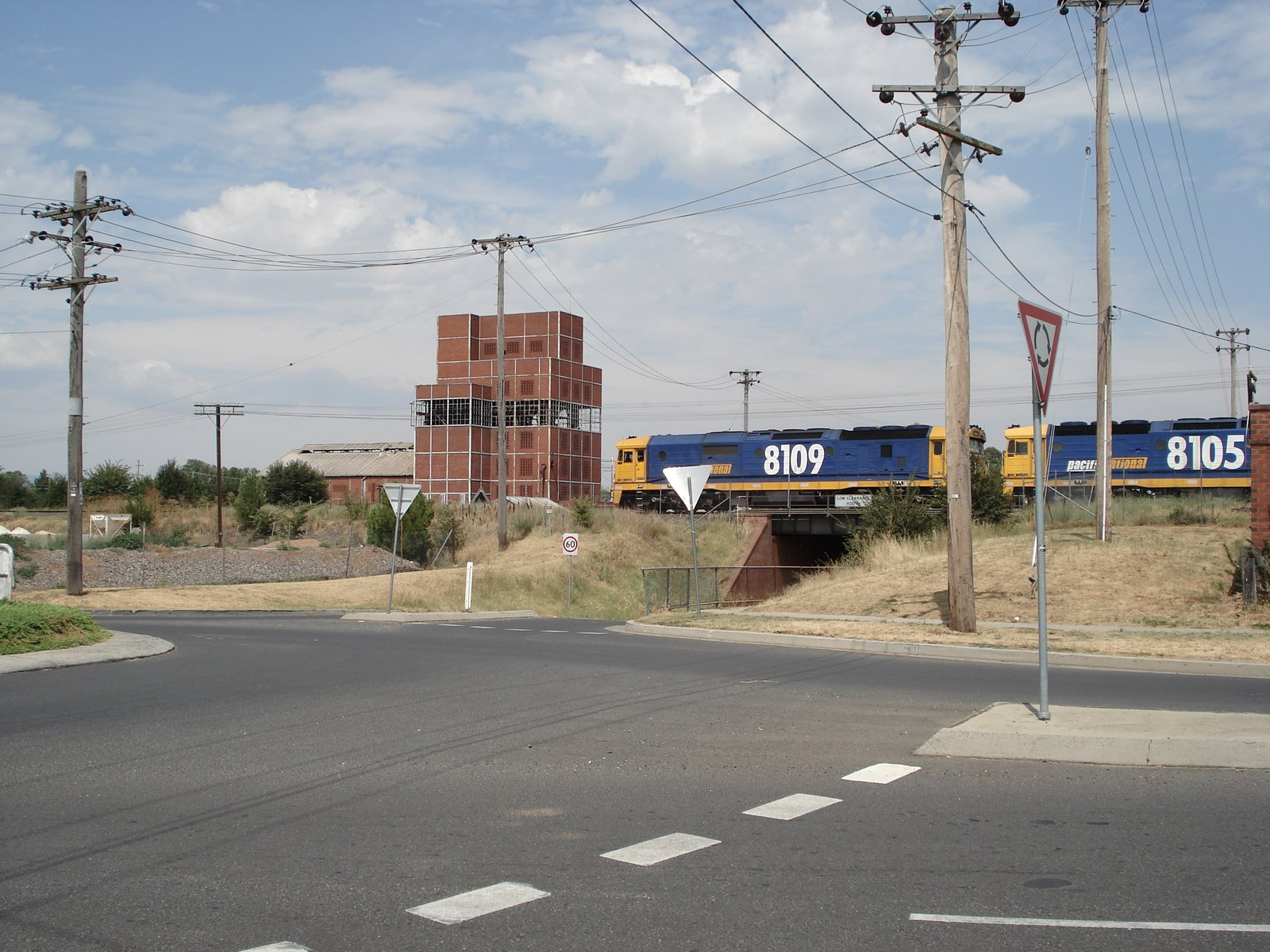
Pacific National train departing from Bathurst, February 2009

The Australian Competition and Consumer Commission attached special conditions to the sale to ensure competition in the rail freight industry. The company was required to provide a "starter pack" of locomotives, wagons, train paths, and freight terminals for a third party rail operator on the east-west route across the Nullarbor Plain. To fulfil that, Pacific National sold nine refurbished G class locomotives to competitor SCT Logistics to allow it to operate its own services.

=== Ownership ===
In 2005, Toll Holdings launched a successful hostile takeover of its joint venture partner Patrick Corporation, giving Toll Holdings 100% ownership of Pacific National. In 2007, Toll Holdings was restructured into two separately ASX listed companies: Toll Holdings and Asciano Limited. As part of this restructure, Pacific National became a wholly owned subsidiary of Asciano Limited.

In 2016, Asciano agreed to sell Pacific National to Australian Logistics Acquisition Investments Pty Ltd, a consortium of Global Infrastructure Partners, CPP Investment Board, China Investment Corporation, GIC Private Limited and British Columbia Investment Management Corporation. The transfer was completed on 19 August 2016.

=== Queensland expansion (2005–present) ===
In March 2005, Pacific National Queensland became the first non-Queensland Rail narrow gauge commercial rail operation in Queensland, with the commencement of container services between Brisbane and Cairns.

In 2009, Pacific National Queensland further expanded its narrow gauge operations, entering the export coal market, then dominated by incumbent Queensland Rail.

=== Tasmania withdrawal (2005–2009) ===
In September 2005, Pacific National angered the Tasmanian atate and Australian federal governments when it threatened to withdraw all services unless the governments paid a $100 million subsidy. Initially the governments refused to act on the issue claiming they would not be "held to mercy" by Pacific National, owned by Toll and Patrick Corporation, "which are extremely profitable multi-national companies". However, state infrastructure minister Bryan Green and federal counterpart transport minister Warren Truss announced a $120 million rescue package.

In May 2007, the Tasmanian Government, the federal government and Pacific National came to an agreement regarding the funding, ownership and operation of the Tasmanian railway network; with the Tasmanian Government acquiring the railway infrastructure previously leased to Pacific National, who would continue to provide above rail services on the network. In September 2009, the Tasmanian Government purchased the Tasmanian rail business, with rail infrastructure and railway operations to be maintained, managed and owned by a new TasRail.

In November 2006, Pacific National entered into an agreement to sell the remainder of its Victorian rail lease of the network back to the Victorian Government. The sale was completed in May 2007, with the government-owned V/Line taking over management of the track.

=== Downsizing controversy (2007–2008) ===
In December 2007, Pacific National announced plans to sell or close its grain transport and Portlink rural container business operations in Victoria, selling or closing Patrick's intermodal freight business in Tasmania, and downsizing to a bare minimum Pacific National's grain operations across New South Wales. The decision was criticised as it forced grain growers to use higher cost road transport to transport the annual grain harvest from rural silos to the ports. The decision has saw many commentators accuse Pacific National of acquiring the operations of Freight Australia in 2004 only for the purposes of asset stripping and eliminating competition in rail freight.

In 2008, the company declined to sell wagons which had reached the end of their useful life to other Australian rail operators, indicating that the wagons would be scrapped or exported to Saudi Arabia.

The container freight service to Horsham, Victoria was almost cancelled in April 2008 but was given a three-month reprieve by the company. In July 2008, the service was taken over by QR National and later Qube.

== Operations ==
Pacific National is Australia's largest private rail freight operator. Pacific National operates in all mainland states and territories. As of June 2012, the company operates 596 locomotives and 12,875 wagons. Services include bulk freight (coal, grain, steel, ore), intermodal containers (domestic and import-export), and specialised services such as 'hook and pull' for long-distance passenger trains.

The Pacific National steel contract was renewed with BlueScope and OneSteel in 2006 for $1 billion, making it the largest ever freight rail contract in Australia. The deal involves haulage of about 3 million tonnes of steel over seven years. Pacific National has intermodal freight facilities at the Brisbane Freight Terminal in Queensland, the Melbourne Freight Terminal in Victoria, the Sydney Freight Terminal in New South Wales, the Adelaide Freight Terminal in South Australia and the Kewdale Freight Terminal in Western Australia.

== Current locomotive fleet ==
Class	Image	Type	Gauge	Top speed (km/h)	Built	Number	Notes
Rural and Bulk Division
48 class		Diesel-electric	Standard	115	1959–1970	48	Ex-FreightCorp: 16 in service, 32 stored
80 class	8013 at Port Kembla Downer EDi	Diesel-electric	Standard	115	1979–1983	22	Ex-FreightCorp: 13 stored, 5 scrapped, 4 operational
81 class		Diesel-electric	Standard	115	1982–1991	83	Ex-FreightCorp: 83 in service. 8102, 8106, 8107, 8108, 8112, 8114, 8115, 8117, 8118, 8120, 8121, 8122 and 8143 allocated to Intermodal
82 class		Diesel-electric	Standard	115	1994–1995	55	Ex-FreightCorp: 54 is service, 1 scrapped
BL class		Diesel-electric	Standard, Broad	115	1983–1984	10	Ex-National Rail Corporation: 9 in service, 1 scrapped
DL class		Diesel-electric	Standard	115	1988–1990	14	Ex-National Rail Corporation: all stored or scrapped
G class		Diesel-electric	Broad, Standard	115	1985–1989	20	Ex-Freight Australia: 9 sold to SCT Logistics in 2007, 2 stored
T class		Diesel-electric	Broad, Standard	100	1964–1968	1	Ex-Freight Australia: T371 in service as North Geelong shunter
X class		Diesel-electric	Broad, Standard	115	1966–1976	3	Ex-Freight Australia: all stored
XR class		Diesel-electric	Broad, Standard	115	2002–2006	9	6 ex-Freight Australia: 3 built in-house, 1 stored
RT class		Diesel-mechanical	Broad, Standard	15	1957–1969	1	Ex-Freight Australia: Used for shunting at Peaco Foods' siding, Donald
Intermodal Division
94 class		Diesel-electric	Standard	115	2024–present	50	Fleet rejuvenation in intermodal/interstate operations, plus future Inland Rail. Will have the Evolution series engine 'C44ESACi'
AN class	Pacific National AN Class	Diesel-electric	Standard	115	1992–1993	10	Ex-National Rail Corporation: all stored
NR class		Diesel-electric	Standard	115	1996–1998	117	Ex-National Rail Corporation
XRB class		Diesel-electric	Standard	115	2005	3	Cabless units: all stored
Coal Division
90 class		Diesel-electric	Standard	115	1994–2005	35	Ex-FreightCorp: all stored or scrapped
92 class	Pacific National 92 Class at East Maitland	Diesel-electric	Standard	115	2008–2009	15	
93 class		Diesel-electric	Standard	115	2012–2020	24	
TT class		Diesel-electric	Standard	115	2009–2012	49	
Pacific National Queensland
71 class		Electric	Narrow	80	2009–2011	42	
83 class		Diesel-electric	Narrow	100	2008–2013	52	8347-8352 entered service in 2018
88 class		Diesel-electric	Narrow	100	2014	5	
PH class		Diesel-electric	Narrow	100	2014	3	
PN class		Diesel-electric	Narrow	100	2005	13	

== Former locomotive fleet ==
Class	Image	Type	Gauge	Top speed (km/h)	Built	Number	Notes
45 class		Diesel-electric	Standard	115	1962	2	Ex-Patrick Corporation: both scrapped
A class		Diesel-electric	Broad	115	1984-1985	7	Ex-Freight Australia: 6 scrapped (A71, 77, 79, 81, 83 and 85) and 1 (A78) donated to SRHC
D16 class		Diesel-electric	Standard	35	1959-1964	12	Handed back to BlueScope
D35 class		Diesel-electric	Standard	50	1975	1	Handed back to BlueScope
H class		Diesel-electric	Broad, Standard	100	1968	5	Ex-Freight Australia: 1 scrapped (H4). 1 stored (H1) and 3 sold to Ettamogah Rail Hub in 2015 (H2, H3 + H5) then H1 - H3 + H5 on sold to Watco Australia mid-2023
L class		Diesel- electric	Standard	137	1967–1969, 1972–1973	2	Ex-ATN Access: both scrapped
P class		Diesel-electric	Broad	100	1985	5	Ex-Freight Australia: P19, P21, P22 and P23 sold on: P20 donated to 707 Operations
PB class	Pacific National PB Class	Hybrid	Standard	80	2014	7	All sold to Watco Australia in late 2021
PL class		Diesel-electric	Standard	115	1999-2001	7	Ex-FreightCorp: PL2-PL7 scrapped, PL1 sold to Progress Rail in July 2025. Port Augusta shunter
RTL class		Diesel-electric	Broad, Standard	60	1995	1	Ex-Freight Australia: stored until 2011, later sold to maintenance company Just Track
S class		Diesel-electric	Broad, Standard	115	1957	3	Ex-Freight Australia: S301, S306 & S307 all sold to heritage groups in 2023 and 2024
V class		Diesel-electric	Standard	115	2002	1	Ex-Freight Australia: Sold to Aurizon in August 2022
Y class		Diesel-electric	Broad, Standard	65	1963–1968	20	Ex-Freight Australia: all on-sold or scrapped
Pacific National Tasmania
DQ class		Diesel-electric	Narrow	80	1964-1969	12	To TasRail in 2009, 4 stored
DV class		Diesel-electric	Narrow	72	1961-1971	1	To TasRail in 2009, De-motored and is used as a driving van
Y class		Diesel-electric	Narrow	72	1961-1971	1	To TasRail in 2009, 1 in service as a shunter and one de-motored and is used as a driving van
D class		Diesel-electric	Narrow	80	1971	2	To TasRail in 2009, all stored
DC class		Diesel-electric	Narrow	100	1964	1	To TasRail in 2009, scrapped
MKA class		Diesel-electric	Narrow	80	1967-1972	6	To TasRail in 2009, all stored
QR class		Diesel-electric	Narrow	80	1964-1969	3	To TasRail in 2009, All scrapped
Z class		Diesel-electric	Narrow	97	1973	4	To TasRail in 2009, all preserved; 2 at Don River Railway; 2 at Bellarine Peninsula Railway
Za class		Diesel-electric	Narrow	97	1973-1976	3	To TasRail in 2009, 1 stored, 2 preserved (1 at Don River Railway); 1 at Tasmanian Transport Museum
ZB class		Diesel-electric	Narrow	80	1973	4	To TasRail in 2009, 2 preserved (one at Don River Railway, other at Launceston and North East Railway), 2 stored;
ZC class		Diesel-electric	Narrow	80	1966-72	4	To TasRail in 2009, 3 scrapped, 1 preserved at Launceston and North East Railway
ZP class		Diesel-electric	Narrow	80	1973	1	To TasRail in 2009, preserved at the Don River Railway
ZR class		Diesel-electric	Narrow	80	1973	1	To TasRail in 2009, stored
