= New Zealand DQ and QR class locomotives =

Class of diesel locomotives

DQ and QR class
Type and origin
- Power type: Diesel-electric
- Builder: Clyde Engineering, Eagle Farm, Australia
- Model: Electro-Motive Diesel G12 (1460)/G22C (1502)
- Build date: 1964 - 1969
- Rebuilder: Hutt Workshops
- Rebuild date: 1996 - 1999
- Number rebuilt: 16 (DQ), 6 (QR)
Specifications
- Configuration
  - UIC: Co-Co
- Gauge: 1,067 mm (3 ft 6 in)
- Wheelbase: 13.55 m (44 ft 5 in) between bogies 2.58 m (8 ft 6 in) between axles in each bogie
- Length: 16.3 m (53 ft 6 in)
- Loco weight: 92 tonnes (91 long tons; 101 short tons)
- Fuel type: Diesel
- Prime mover: Electro-Motive Diesel 645E
- Engine type: V12 2 stroke diesel
- Generator: Electro-Motive Diesel D25 or D32T
- Traction motors: Electro-Motive Diesel D29
- Cylinders: 12
Performance figures
- Maximum speed: 80 km/h (50 mph)
- Power output: 1,120 kW (1,500 hp)
- Tractive effort: 1460: 1,065 kW (1,428 hp); 1502: 1,230 kW (1,650 hp)
Career
- Operators: Tranz Rail, RRL Grindrod, TasRail
- Number in class: 25 (1460: 21 1502: 4); 16 rebuilt as DQ class, 6 as QR class, 3 spares only
- Numbers: 6007 - 6036 (1502s); 6324 - 6416 (1460s)
- Delivered: 12 September 1995 – 25 June 1997
- First run: 28 August 1996 – 5 October 1999
- Last run: March 2013 (NZ)
- Retired: May 1998 – March 2013 (NZ); 2015 - present (Tasmania)
- Withdrawn: May 1998 – March 2013 (NZ); 2015 - present (Tasmania)
- Current owner: RRL Grindrod; TasRail
- Disposition: 14 in service 6 stored 4 scrapped 1 undergoing conversion to driving trailer

The DQ and QR class were a class of diesel locomotives in New Zealand and Tasmania, Australia. Originally built by Clyde Engineering in the 1960s as Queensland Rail 1460 and 1502 class locomotives, they were purchased by Tranz Rail in 1995 to be rebuilt, as a cheaper alternative to buying new locomotives.

== Introduction ==
Between March and September 1995, New Zealand Rail Limited (renamed Tranz Rail in October 1995) purchased twenty-one 1460 and four 1502 class locomotives from Queensland Rail with the intention of rebuilding them for service in New Zealand. Seven 1460 and one 1502 class arrived in Auckland on 12 September 1995, and were later hauled to Hutt Workshops in Wellington. The second batch followed on the inter-island rail ferry MV Aratika, which was returning from Brisbane after a heavy engineering inspection, with twelve 1460 and three 1502 class locomotives. This batch arrived in Wellington on 23 May 1997. The last batch arrived on 25 June 1997, which consisted of two locomotives that were decided to be left behind on the second batch due to mechanical reasons. This batch arrived on the MV Lauriegracht.

Tranz Rail split them into two classes. The DQ class were rebuilt with a brand new cab and low nose and painted in the Cato Blue livery, with dynamic brakes, a computerised control system and rebuilt engine. The QR class were overhauled with auto-transition couplings and were also repainted in the Cato Blue livery, and were only used as trailing locomotives as they were not fitted with the safety equipment required to lead trains. The 1460s were originally planned to be reclassified as the DQC class, while the 1502s were planned to be reclassified as the DQF class. The classifications were later dropped.

The first locomotive, DQ15215 (ex-1521), underwent mainline testing from September to October 1996. 15215 was a temporary number that combined the Queensland number with a TMS check digit. It was soon renumbered as DQ6007, and released into revenue service in October 1996. The locomotive was unofficially named "The Platypus". Those rebuilt from 1502 class locomotives received 60XX numbers and those from 1460 class received 63XX numbers. This was done to differentiate the different power output of class members. DQ6007 had a horizontal mounted headlight and numbers below the headlight assembly on the front wall of the cab, while the rest had vertical mounted headlights and numbers on either side of the headlight assembly. The first of the QR class entered service in October 1997. Three (1499–1501) were not rebuilt, but they were all used as sources of spare parts at Hutt Workshops.

1460 class locomotive N^{O} 1499 was due to be rebuilt as the prototype of the DQT class, a turbocharged version of the DQ class. But the programme was cancelled just less than a year later leaving 1499 as just an underframe, which was scrapped in 2001. 1500 and 1501 were also planned to be rebuilt as DQTs as well, but after the programme was dropped. Tranz Rail later approved to rebuild them as DQs, but this never commenced and were kept in storage at Hutt.

== Service ==
Following the introduction of DQ6007, the loco was used between Wellington and Palmerston North for shakedown purposes for two weeks, and also to sort out teething issues. It was later assigned to freight services throughout the lower North Island. A further six DQs and seven QRs followed. Initially they were not preferred by locomotive crews due to excessive cab noise levels and emissions into the cab. Tranz Rail made modifications to DQ6324 that reduced the noise level to that acceptable to the Rail & Maritime Transport Union, and also diesel fumes from entering the cab. The QRs were modified and repainted for uses as slave units.

The class were largely assigned to freight trains. They did see some use on the Capital Connection and Wairarapa Connection long-distance suburban services, and occasionally on the Overlander as far as Palmerston North. It was soon discovered that the DQ class were not particularly reliable. Generator failures were particularly common, and so they were removed from long-distance operations to less-demanding short-haul runs, such as between Middleton Yard in Christchurch and the port of Lyttelton on the final leg of coal trains from the West Coast, and on the Ohai Branch line to and from Invercargill, hauling containerized coal trains. Several were also used as bankers to help trains up the gradients from Dunedin, and later up the 1 in 37 (2.7%) gradient out of Picton. 1460 class loco N^{O} 1500 was used occasionally as a shunter at Hutt Workshops. Then unrebuilt 1460 class locomotive N^{O} 1465 was used on a Mechanical Test Train in August 1997, registered on TMS as DQ14654 (however this number was never carried on the unit itself).

== Exports to Tasmania ==
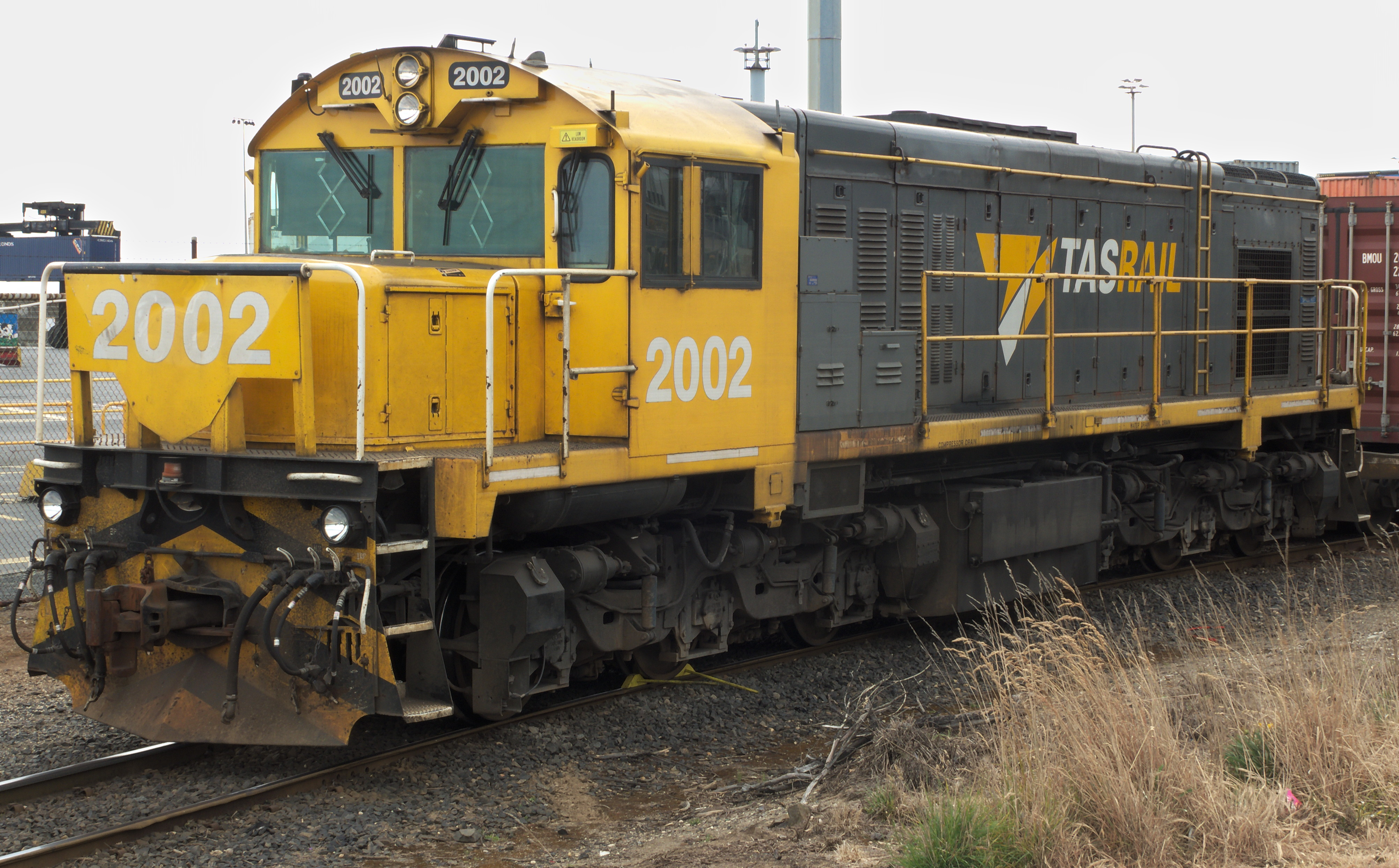
TasRail DQ2002 at Port of Burnie, 2015

After purchasing AN Tasrail in 1997, Australian Transport Network (ATN), which shared the same Wisconsin Central ownership as Tranz Rail, quickly needed locomotives to replace the run down fleet of Alco and English Electric locomotives it inherited. Thus twelve DQs and three QRs were transferred to Tasmania; DQs 6007, 6330, 6353 and QR 3032, along with eight 1460 class locomotives. The three DQs were modified for service in Tasmania, while QR 3032 had its short-hood lowered as a DQ. The eight 1460s were fully rebuilt as DQs, with some being undergoing rebuilding when they were sold. Originally the three QRs were on a one-year lease, but were later sold. The modifications made to the units were changing the drawgear back to the originally Queensland Railways standard height, increasing the fuel tank capacity, relocate the battery boxes, installation of a sludge tank and engine room sump pan, fitting of the "Kaitiaki" vigilance, fitting of ZTR electronic anti-wheelslip technology and upgrading dynamic brakes. The locomotives were also renumbered in the 2000 series, and tested between Wellington and Palmerston North. The ex-1460s were fitted with EMD 567C prime movers, that were originally fitted into the ex-1502 class locomotives.

The first two DQs, 2001 and 2002, were loaded on the MV Polar Queen on 28 August 1998, and arrived in Bell Bay on 2 September 1998. The two locomotives were repainted in ATN's red livery, which consisted of green "Tasrail" lettering, bright tomato red all over the locomotives and yellow bar-code stripes on the short-hood. The next batch consisted of DQs 2003, 2004 and 2005, which were repainted in the Wisconsin Central maroon livery, and QRs 2056, 2062 and 2102, which were still repainted in the Cato Blue livery. The new livery for Tasrail consisted of maroon, with a wide buff yellow stripe and red "Tasrail" lettering, with the Tasmanian flag next to the letters. The reason in the change of livery is due to ATN not being impressed of the cost of it. This batched left the Port of Wellington on 8 December 1998 on the Arktis Dream, and arrived in Tasmania on 15 December 1998. The third batch left on 23 February 1999 on the Edisongracht, compromising of DQs 2006, 2007 and 2008, and arrived in Tasmania on 3 March 1999. The last batch, which consisted of DQs 2009, 2010, 2011 and 2012, left Wellington on the Melanesian Chief on 28 September 1999, and arrived in Tasmania on 5 October 1999.

The DQs have not been overly reliable in Tasmania either. The locomotives have had a high number of main generator failures, since their arrivals. Reductions in rated haulage capacity reduced the number of in service failures and train operating problems. All were included in the 2004 sale of ATN to Pacific National and then in 2009 to TasRail. Six locomotives have been repainted into the new grey and yellow livery. DQ 2001, which had just been reassembled, became the first loco to be repainted in the new livery in August 2010. Two DQs are carrying special advertising panels, in-place of TasRails logo. 2006 carries a level crossing safety advertisement, while 2012 carries logos commemorating the 75th anniversary of the Rosebery Mine.

The three QRs were again used as trail units in Tasmania due to the lack of radios and other equipment, as what are fitted to other lead locomotives. They were also occasionally used for yard shunts. The three locomotives never saw much service in the first few years, with 2062 and 2102 being placed into storage within the first year, with 2056 following not long after. The three later returned to service. QR 2102 withdrawn again after a major engine failure in July 2002. 2056 was again withdrawn in August 2005. By 2008, only 2062 remained in service. It was generally on the Melba line, but was occasionally used on the South line. It was withdrawn in November 2009. The locomotives were stored at East Tamar Workshops after withdrawal. They were transported to One Steel in Bell Bay in June 2012 and scrapped.

The DQs and QRs were sold to TasRail in 2001. In 2017, it was announced that DQ 2007 would be converted into driving trailer DV2 for the Railton to Devonport cement trains, to replace DV1. As at February 2023, it was undergoing trials. As at October 2022, of the remaining 11, seven were operational with four in store at East Tamar Workshops.

== Withdrawal in New Zealand ==
Following the sale of twelve DQs and three QRs locomotives to TasRail, Tranz Rail retained DQs 6324, 6347, 6376 and 6382 and QRs 2027, 2079 and 2085. The trio of QRs were seen used as slave units on freight trains in both islands, and occasionally on the Coastal Pacific. In March/April 2000, DQs 6347 and 6376 were transferred to the South Island for the coal shuttles between Middleton and Lyttelton. In mid-November that year, DQs 6324 and 6382 were also allocated to the South Island for banking services between Oamaru and Dunedin. The locomotives were later used for banking services between Picton and Wharanui as well.

The three QRs were withdrawn in mid-July 1999 and were placed into storage at Hutt Workshops. In 2003, the trio of QRs and the two un-rebuilt 1460 class locomotives were sold to the National Railway Equipment Company. In November 2005, the five locomotives were shipped to Mount Vernon, Illinois in the United States. The two 1460 class locomotives were overhauled are in use in the Southern Hemisphere. 1460 class locomotive N^{O} 1500 is owned and operated by the Magadi Soda Company in Kenya, and renumbered as their N^{O} 5001. 1501 is now owned and operated by CMP in Chile, and renumbered as their N^{O} 9, and entered service for its new owner circa 2008. The other three remain in Mount Vernon, stripped of several components.

DQs 6324 and 6382 were both withdrawn in 2002. 6382 was stored at Hillside Workshops and stripped of its six traction motors and other parts, while 6324 was placed on stand-by in Middleton Yard for the remaining two, which back then were used only on the coal dumps between Middleton and Lyttelton. 6324 was later placed into storage at Linwood Depot, and also used for spare parts. DQ6376 was later withdrawn due to a defective main generator. These three locomotives were later returned to service after being overhauled at Hutt Workshops.

On 20 June 2011, DQ6376 was damaged when it, and leading unit DFT 7117, collided with a slip at Claverley, south of Kaikōura. It was then withdrawn and taken to Hutt Workshops and not returned to service, and became a source of spare parts. DQ6324 was withdrawn in mid to late 2012 had worn its wheelsets down to the minimum code, and was also placed into storage at Hutt Workshops. In March 2013, DQs 6347 and 6382 were withdrawn from service and placed into storage in Middleton Yard.

In February 2013, KiwiRail placed 6324 and 6376 up for sale overseas, with 6347 and 6382 in the following month. DQs 6347 and 6382 were sold via APEX International, while the other two were sold to the National Railway Equipment Company. 6347 and 6382 were towed from Middleton Yard to Auckland in April 2013, and were shipped from the Port of Auckland on 13 May in the same year. While the remaining two were towed north from Hutt Workshops in July 2013, and shipped on 4 August 2013. They were rebuilt in South Africa by RRL Grindrod for use in Mozambique. 6347 and 6382 have been reclassified as RRL22-02 and RRL22-01, while 6324 and 6376 were reclassified as BG15-01 and BG15-02. RRL22-01, RRL22-02 and BG15-01 are operated at the Nacala Corridor for a cement site, while BG15-02 was operated by the Harmony Mining Company in Welkom OFS. In October 2017, RRL22-01 and RRL22-02 were put up for sale by Grindrod. BG15-01 and BG15-02 were moved north crossed Beitbridge, and had Tazara painted on them.
