= Tasmanian Government Railways Y class =

Class of Australian diesel locomotives

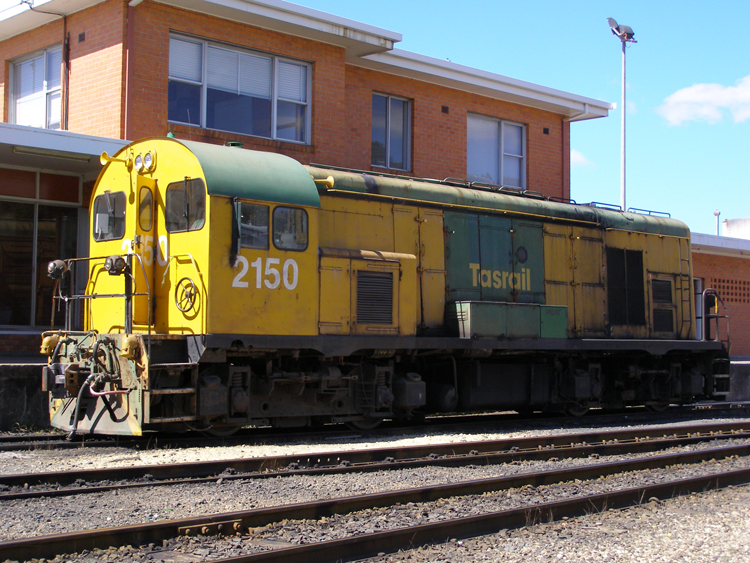
- 2150 at Burnie station in March 2007
Type and origin
- Power type: Diesel-electric
- Builder: Tasmanian Government Railways
- Build date: 1961–1971
- Total produced: 8
Specifications
- Configuration
  - UIC: Bo-Bo
- Gauge: 1,067 mm (3 ft 6 in)
- Wheel diameter: 3 ft 0 1/2 in (0.927 m)
- Minimum curve: 250 ft (76.200 m)
- Wheelbase: 23 ft 10 in (7.264 m) total, 8 ft (2.438 m) bogie
- Length: 44 ft 9 in (13.640 m) over buffers, 41 ft 7 in (12.675 m) over headstocks
- Width: 8 ft 10 1/2 in (2.705 m)
- Height: 12 ft 2 1/2 in (3.721 m)
- Axle load: 14.5 long tons (14.7 t; 16.2 short tons)
- Loco weight: 58 long tons (59 t; 65 short tons)
- Fuel type: Diesel
- Fuel capacity: 500 imp gal (2,273.045 L)
- Lubricant cap.: 95 imp gal (431.879 L)
- Prime mover: English Electric 6SRKT Mk II
- RPM range: 850 rpm max
- Engine type: four stroke, four valves per cylinder
- Aspiration: Turbocharged
- Traction motors: English Electric 537
- Cylinders: Inline 6
- Cylinder size: 10 in × 12 in (254 mm × 305 mm)
- MU working: 90V, nine notch electro-magnetic control
- Loco brake: straight air, proportional control
- Train brakes: Vacuum (Y1 & Y5 later converted to air)
Performance figures
- Maximum speed: 45 miles per hour (72 km/h)
- Power output: 825 hp (620 kW) gross, 750 hp (560 kW) net
- Tractive effort: 34,000 lbf (151.2 kN) at 6 mph (10 km/h)
Career
- Operators: Tasmanian Government Railways; AN Tasrail; TasRail
- Number in class: 8
- Numbers: Y1-Y8
- First run: 4 August 1961
- Current owner: TasRail
- Disposition: 7 preserved, 1 converted to driving van

The Tasmanian Government Railways Y class is a class of diesel locomotives built by the Tasmanian Government Railways between 1961 and 1971.

== History ==
The Y class was designed by English Electric and constructed by the Tasmanian Government Railway's Launceston Railway Workshops. Eight were built as mainline freight and passenger locomotives between 1961 and 1971.

Following the success of the X class, the TGR decided to order additional diesel locomotives.

English Electric submitted plans that were quite similar to the Jamaican Railways 81 class, South Australian Railways 800 class and Midland Railway of Western Australia F class but with a small power increase. They were slightly larger and more powerful than the X class. They had a similar layout to the X class, a long hood unit with the cab at one end.

Construction began at the TGR's Launceston Railway Workshops in 1961, and three of the planned eight were completed relatively quickly. However, construction of the other five was slow, with the last not being delivered until 1971, by which time the design had become dated.

== Technical details ==
The Y class was fitted with an English Electric 6SRKT Mark II (Mark III on last two) in-line six turbocharged diesel engine. They have a Bo-Bo wheel arrangement and end-platforms, making them visually different from the X class.

In line with standard TGR practice of the time, they were fitted with hook-and-link couplers and vacuum train brakes (air on locomotive). With a light tractive weight of only 58 tonnes, a reasonably powerful engine of 825 horsepower (615 kW) and a fairly basic bogie design, gaining traction on long uphill grades was found to be difficult. They were noted to have a tendency to wheel-slip badly. Nevertheless, they were considered successful.

== Later years ==
In March 1978, the Y class was included in the transfer of the Tasmanian Government Railways to Australian National. With the new transfer of twenty 830 class locomotives from South Australia and later purchase of ZB class and ZC class locomotives from Queensland Rail, the Y class was made redundant.

In the late 1970s and early 1980s, all members of the Y class was retrofitted with stronger automatic couplers, which had by then become standard equipment. Y1 and Y5 also received air train brakes in 1985, with the others withdrawn following the cessation of vacuum braked services in 1988. Most of these were being preserved at this stage. With Y2 going to Derwent Valley Railway, Y3 going to the Queen Victoria Museum & Art Gallery, Launceston, Y4 to Tasmanian Transport Museum and finally Y6&8 to Don River Railway. Tasrail retained Y7 for parts.

In 2001, Y7 was rebuilt as a driving van for use on Railton to Devonport cement trains. With Y7 stored in 2017. Two members of the class remained in regular service with TasRail, renumbered as the 2150 class, until mid 2016 when stored out of use. In its twilight years, Y1 was modified with reinforced side windows, an extra window on the front door and sealed headlights, as well as a repaint into Tasrail yellow and grey. Y5 received much of the same modifications, except it retained its reverse AN yellow and green. The modifications to Y5 were reversed when the locomotive entered preservation.

In May 2022, Y1 (2150) & Y5 (2151) where donated for preservation to Derwent Valley Railway and Launceston & North East Railway respectively. Only leaving DV1, formally Y7, not preserved.

== Status table ==
Image	Original no	Final no	Current livery	Name	Owner	Status
	Y1	2150	Tasrail yellow and grey		Derwent Valley Railway	Preserved
	Y2		TGR red with white stripes	Henry Baldwin	Derwent Valley Railway	Preserved, in early stages of overhaul
	Y3		TGR red with white stripes		Queen Victoria Museum & Art Gallery, Launceston	Preserved
	Y4		TGR red with white stripes	Rowallan	Tasmanian Transport Museum, Glenorchy	Preserved, operational
	Y5	2151	AN/Tasrail reverse yellow and green	Sir Charles Gairdner	Launceston & North East Railway	Preserved
	Y6		TGR yellow		Don River Railway, Devonport	Preserved, operational
	Y7	DV1	Tasrail yellow and grey		TasRail	Stored
	Y8		TGR yellow with ANR logos		Don River Railway, Devonport	Preserved, derelict
