= Australian Transport Network =

Former freight railway operator in Australia

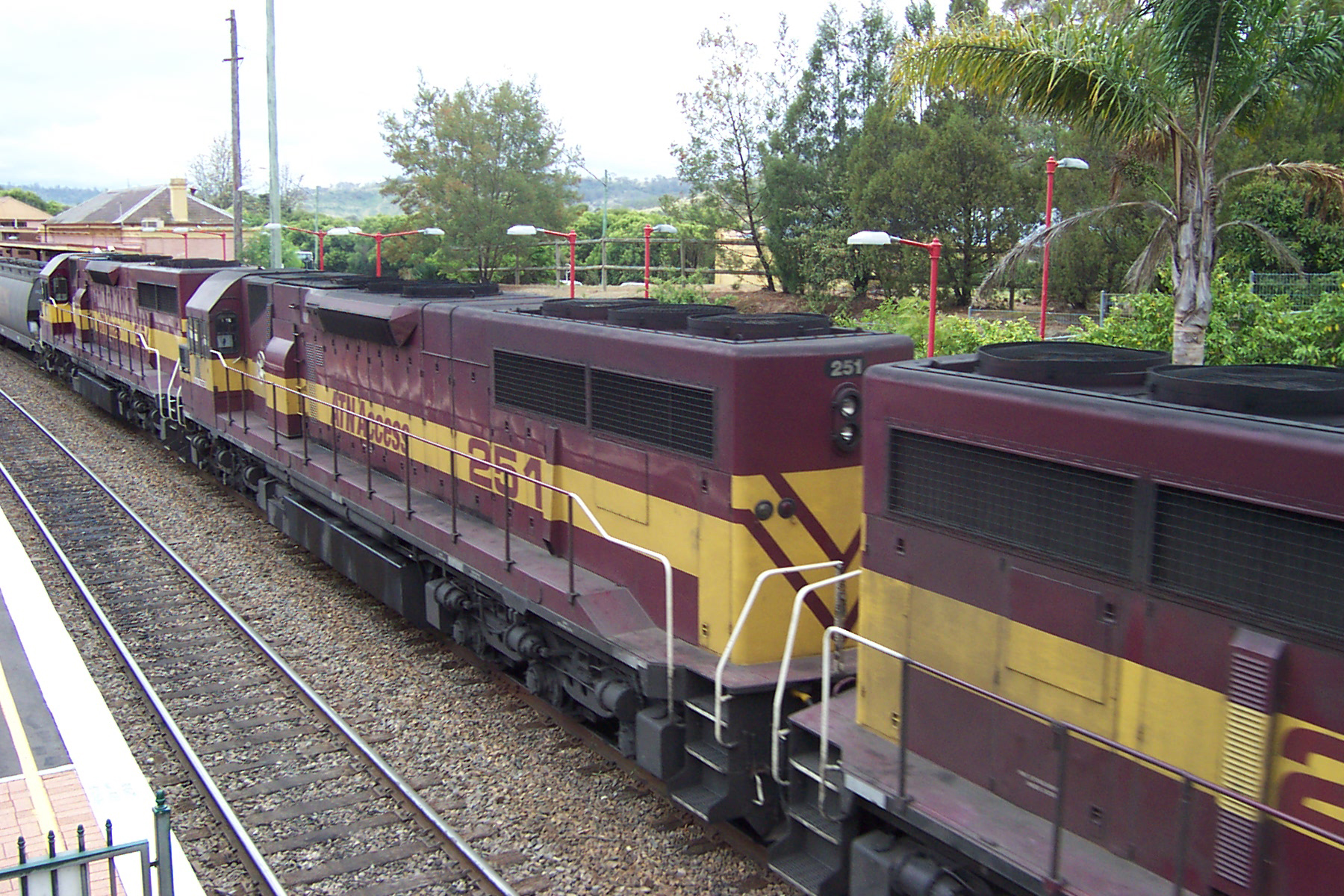
- L Class locomotives at Picton station in September 2001 wearing the same livery as Wisconsin Central locomotives in the United States, due to the WC owning the ATN at the time.
- Industry: Rail operator
- Founded: 1 November 1997
- Defunct: February 2004
- Fate: sold
- Successor: Pacific National
- Number of locations: New South Wales; Victoria; Tasmania
- Parent: Tranz Rail (67%); Wisconsin Central (Canadian National Railway) (33%)
- Divisions: ATN Access; Tasrail

Australian Transport Network (ATN) was a freight railway operator in Australia that commenced operating in November 1997. The company operated narrow gauge trains in Tasmania and standard gauge trains in New South Wales and Victoria. It was formed as a joint venture with Tranz Rail owning 67% and Wisconsin Central (part owner of Tranz Rail) 33%. In February 2004, ATN was sold to Pacific National.

== AN Tasrail ==
In August 1997, ATN was announced as the successful bidder for Australian National's Tasrail operation in Tasmania with the handover occurring on 1 November 1997. In 1998, Tasrail purchased the Emu Bay Railway from Pasminco.

The president of Wisconsin Central, Ed Burkhardt dispatched Mark Rosner to Australia to take control in Tasmania. Amongst Rosner's achievements was the implementing of a new condensed Operating Rule Book, which eliminated some more complex practices in favour of vastly simplified procedures. Single car roadside freight was resumed where customers required it (discontinued under Australian National) in line with US short line practice. On sections of the main trunk line north of Hobart, moving block train spacing (5,000 metres minimum) managed over train radio replaced fixed block train order working introduced under Australian National.

ATN inherited a fleet of Alco and English Electric locomotives from Australian National and Walkers diesel-hydraulics from Emu Bay Railway. In line with Wisconsin Central's preference for Electro-Motive Diesel products, 15 DQ class locomotives that had been rebuilt at Hutt Workshops from 1960s built Queensland Rail 1460 and 1502 class locomotives were transferred from Tranz Rail in 1998/99 along with DC4588. Two rebuilt Westrail D class locomotives were also forwarded from Tranz Rail in August 2001.

In conjunction with a new train radio system, in June 1998 the entire locomotive fleet was renumbered. At this stage 31 locomotives were operated.

== ATN Access ==
On the mainland, ATN Access was formed to bid for freight work. In 1999 a contract was awarded by the Australian Wheat Board to haul 300,000 tonnes of grain per annum from the Riverina and Dimboola regions to Port Kembla and Appleton Dock with operations commencing in June 2000.

ATN Access purchased seven L class locomotives from Westrail in July 1999 (251, 253, 254, 265, 270, 271 and 276) with four being overhauled by National Railway Equipment Company, Whyalla. In June 2000, three 830 class (833, 838 and 845) locomotives were purchased from Australian Southern Railroad. These were often supplemented by locomotives hired from Chicago Freight Car Leasing Australia and Great Northern Rail Services. ATN Access also imported 44 new grain wagons from China. These were constructed at the Qiqihar Railway Workshops in Northern China.
