= Queensland Railways 1460 class =

Australian diesel-electric locomotives

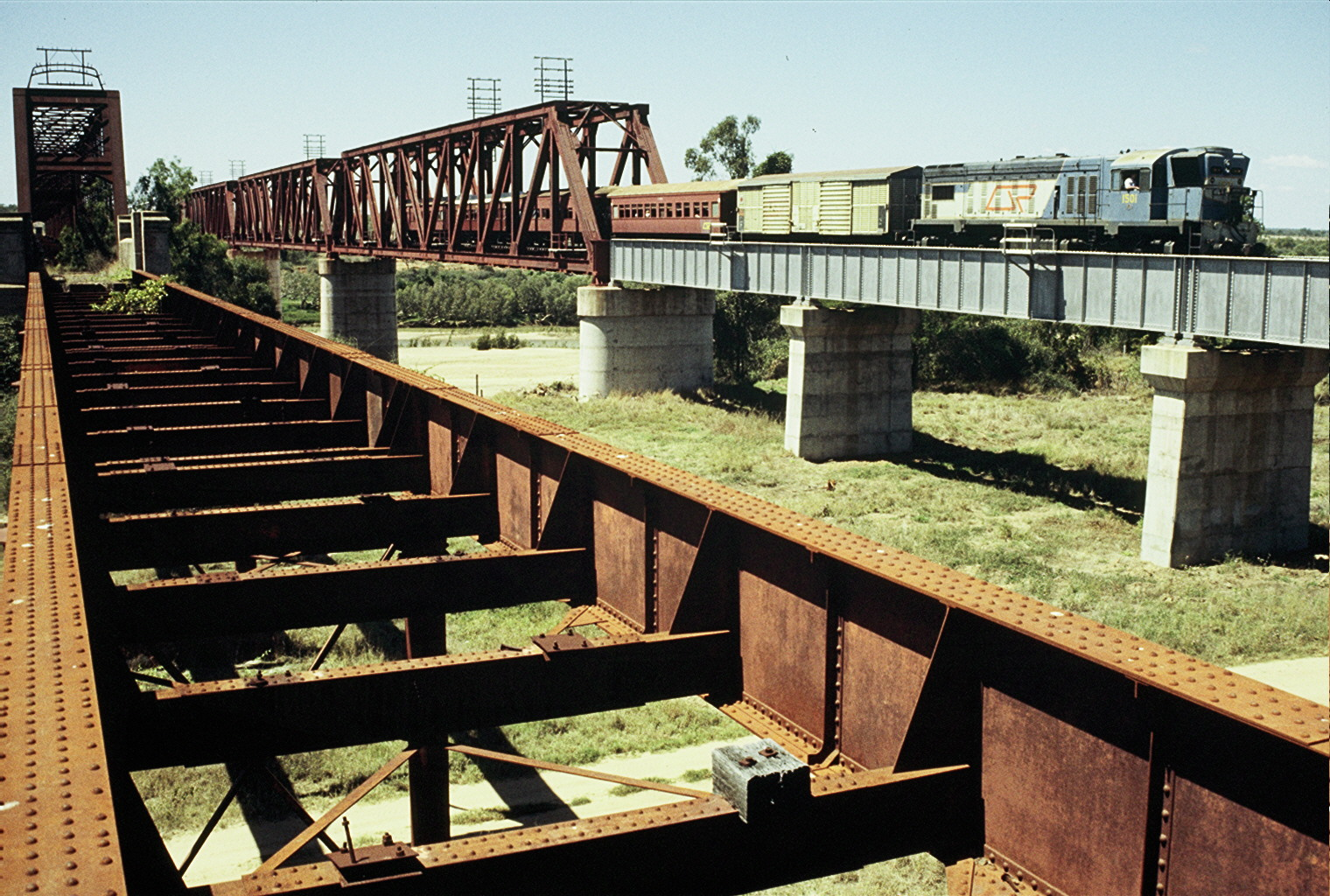
- 1501 crossing Burdekin Bridge in September 1989, with the disused 1882 bridge in the foreground
Type and origin
- Power type: Diesel-electric
- Builder: Clyde Engineering, Eagle Farm
- Model: Electro-Motive Diesel G12C
- Build date: 1964-1966
- Total produced: 42
- Rebuilder: Hutt Workshops
- Rebuild date: 1996-1999
- Number rebuilt: 18
Specifications
- Configuration
  - UIC: Co-Co
- Gauge: 1,067 mm (3 ft 6 in)
- Length: 16.26 metres (53 ft 4 in)
- Loco weight: 91.5 tonnes (90.1 long tons; 100.9 short tons)
- Fuel type: Diesel
- Prime mover: Electro-Motive Diesel 567C
- Generator: Electro-Motive Diesel D25
- Traction motors: Electro-Motive Diesel D29
Performance figures
- Maximum speed: 112 km/h (70 mph)
- Tractive effort: 977 kW (1,310 hp)
Career
- Operators: Queensland Rail
- Number in class: 42
- Numbers: 1460-1501
- Delivered: April 1964
- Preserved: 1461
- Current owner: RRL Grindrod; TasRail; Magadi Soda Company; CMP
- Disposition: 16 in service, 1 preserved, 4 stored, 24 scrapped

The 1460 class was a class of diesel locomotives built by Clyde Engineering, Eagle Farm for Queensland Railways between 1964 and 1966.

== History ==
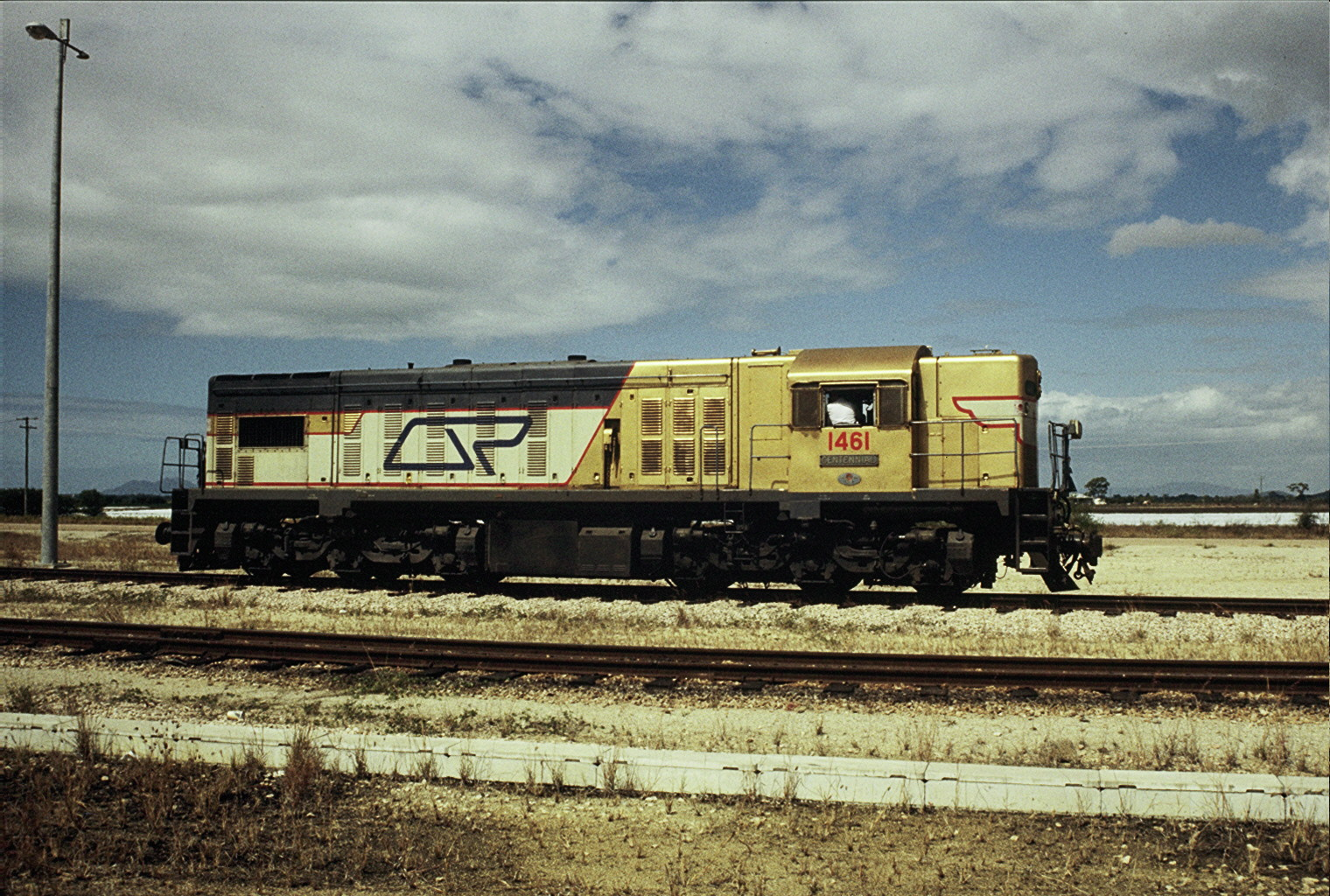
1461 Centennial in its special Centenary of Queensland Railways livery carried from 1965 until it was withdrawn.

The 1460 class was an evolution of the 1450 class fitted with a new carbody and cab as well as dual controls and improved generators. Five were fitted with dynamic braking for descending the Haughton Range from Charters Towers to Townsville on the Great Northern Railway (Mt Isa line). They operated services along the North Coast line.

The first was withdrawn in December 1986. 1492 being the first withdrawn, only after a level crossing accident in Townsville. In 1995, 21 were sold to New Zealand Rail (later Tranz Rail) in New Zealand. Eighteen were overhauled at Hutt Workshops in Wellington, and placed in service with Tranz Rail as the DQ and QR classes or with the Australian Transport Network in Tasmania as the DQ2000 class. Four Tranz Rail DQs were exported to South Africa in 2013.

1461 has been preserved by Queensland Rail's Heritage Division and stored at Workshops Rail Museum, North Ipswich.

== Class register ==
Number	Introduced	Withdrawn	Status	Notes
1460	April 1964		In service	Rebuilt by Tranz Rail as DQ 6382. Operated by a cement company to work at a site near the Nacala Corridor in Mozambique as RRL22-01.
1461	May 1964		Preserved	Withdrawal date unknown. Preserved, Queensland Rails Heritage Division. Under restoration.
1462	May 1964	July 1999	Withdrawn	Modified and reclassified as QR 2027 by Tranz Rail. Stored in Mount Vernon, Illinois.
1463	June 1964		Scrapped	Withdrawal date unknown.
1464	July 1964		Scrapped	Withdrawal date unknown.
1465	July 1964		In service	Rebuilt by Tranz Rail as DQ 6416. Operated by TasRail in Tasmania as DQ 2006.
1466	August 1964		In service	Modified by Tranz Rail as QR 2033. Operated by TasRail in Tasmania as DQ 2010.
1467	September 1964		In service	Rebuilt by Tranz Rail as DQ 6376. Operated by the Harmony Mining Company, Welkom OFS in Mozambique as BG15-02.
1468	September 1964	2015	Withdrawn	Rebuilt by Tranz Rail as DQ 6330. Operated by TasRail in Tasmania as DQ 2005.
1469	September 1964		Scrapped	Withdrawal date unknown.
1470	October 1964		Scrapped	Withdrawal date unknown.
1471	October 1964		Scrapped	Withdrawal date unknown.
1472	November 1964		In service	Rebuilt by Tranz Rail as DQ 6353. Operated by TasRail in Tasmania as DQ 2008.
1473	November 1964		In service	Rebuilt by Tranz Rail as DQ 6324. Operated by a cement company to work at a site near the Nacala Corridor in Mozambique as BG15-01.
1474	December 1964		Scrapped	Withdrawal date unknown.
1475	January 1965	August 2005	Scrapped	Modified and reclassified as QR 2056. Operated by TasRail in Tasmania.
1476	March 1965		Scrapped	Withdrawal date unknown.
1477	March 1965	November 2009	Scrapped	Modified and reclassified by Tranz Rail as QR 2062. Operated by TasRail in Tasmania.
1478	April 1965		Scrapped	Withdrawal date unknown.
1479	April 1965		Scrapped	Withdrawal date unknown.
1480	May 1965		Scrapped	Withdrawal date unknown.
1481	June 1965		In service	Rebuilt by Tranz Rail as DQ 6347. Operated by a cement company to work at a site near the Nacala Corridor in Mozambique as RRL22-02.
1482	June 1965		Scrapped	Withdrawal date unknown.
1483	July 1965		Scrapped	Withdrawal date unknown.
1484	November 1965		In service	Shipped to South Africa. Now operated by APEX.
1485	November 1965		Under overhaul	Rebuilt by Tranz Rail as DQ 6399. Operated by TasRail in Tasmania as DQ 2007. Undergoing conversion to a driving trailer for the Railton to Devonport cement trains.
1486	December 1965		Scrapped	Withdrawal date unknown.
1487	December 1965		Scrapped	Withdrawal date unknown.
1488	December 1965	July 1999	Withdrawn	Modified and reclassified by Tranz Rail as QR 2079. Stored in Mount Vernon in Illinois.
1489	January 1966	July 1999	Withdrawn	Modified and reclassified by Tranz Rail as QR 2085. Stored in Mount Vernon in Illinois.
1490	January 1966		Scrapped	Withdrawal date unknown.
1491	February 1966		In service	Rebuilt by Tranz Rail. Operated by TasRail in Tasmania as DQ 2009.
1492	February 1966		Scrapped	Withdrawal date unknown. Now scrapped. Was the first of the 1460 Class To be Scrapped.
1493	March 1966	July 2002	Scrapped	Modified and reclassified by Tranz Rail as QR 2102. Operated by TasRail in Tasmania. Now scrapped.
1494	March 1966		In service	Shipped to South Africa. Now operated by APEX.
1495	April 1966		In service	Rebuilt by Tranz Rail. Operated by TasRail in Tasmania as DQ 2011.
1496	April 1966		Scrapped	Withdrawal date unknown.
1497	May 1966		In service	Rebuilt by Tranz Rail. Operated by TasRail in Tasmania as DQ 2012.
1498	June 1966		Scrapped	Withdrawal date unknown.
1499	June 1966	November 1989	Scrapped	Scrapped by Tranz Rail.
1500	July 1966		In service	Rebuilt by National Railway Equipment Company. Operated by the Magadi Soda Company in Kenya as their No. 5001.
1501	August 1966		In service	Rebuilt by National Railway Equipment Company. Operated by CMP in Chile as their No. 9.

== See also ==
- New Zealand DQ and QR class locomotives
