= TasRail =

Operates the mainline railways in Tasmania

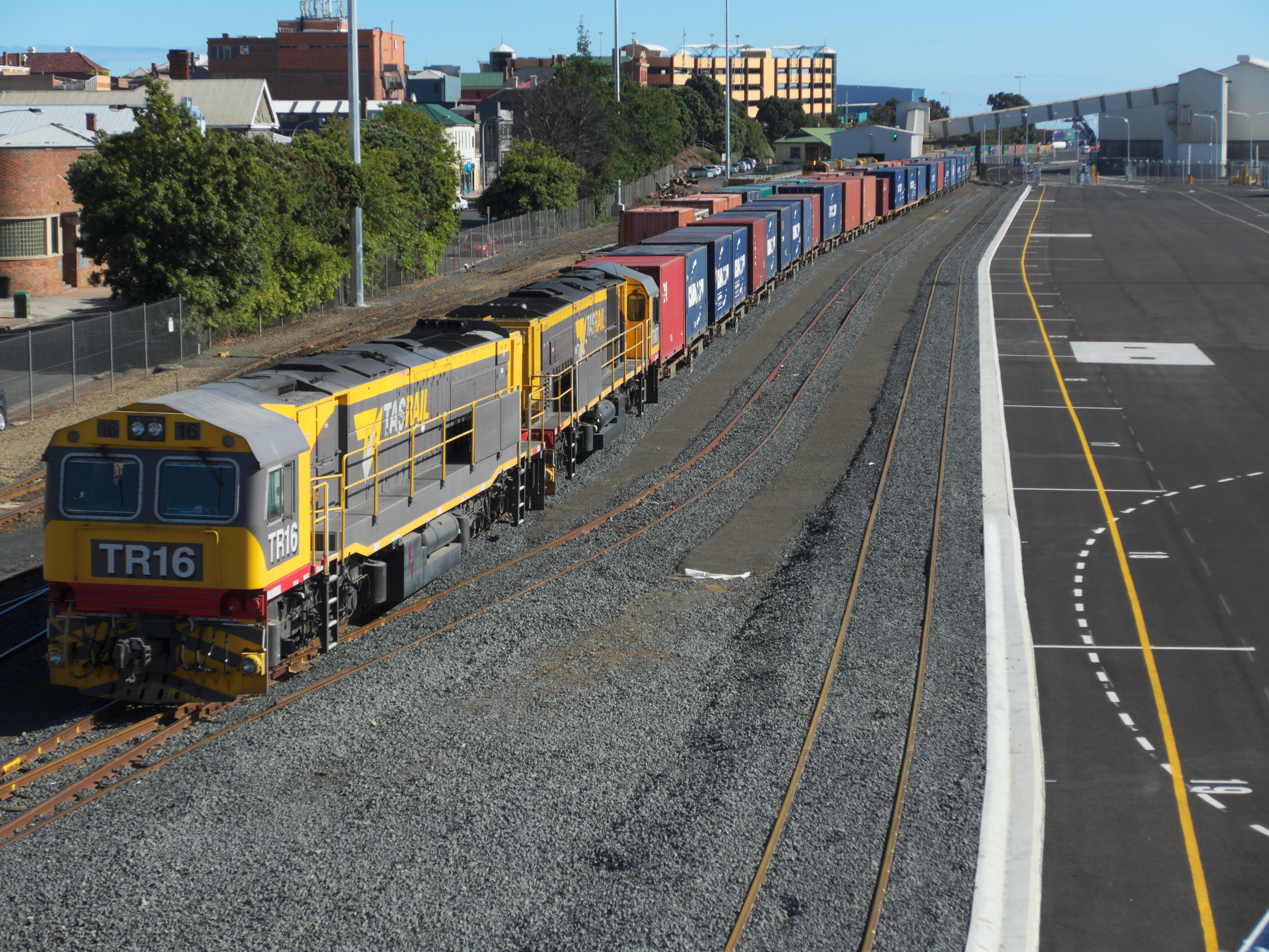
- A TasRail container train led by a TR Class locomotive in January 2016

Overview
- Headquarters: Launceston
- Locale: Tasmania, Australia
- Dates of operation: 1st December 2009–present
- Predecessor: AN Tasrail

Technical
- Track gauge: 1,067 mm (3 ft 6 in)
- Length: 843 km (523.82 mi)

Other
- Website: www.tasrail.com.au

TasRail (officially Tasmanian Railway Pty Limited) is a statutory corporation of the Tasmanian Government that has owned and operated Tasmania's mainline railways since 1st December 2009. It operates freight services only, as passenger trains in Tasmania ceased running in July 1978.

== History ==
Established under the Rail Company Act 2009, on the 1st December 2009 the Tasmanian Government purchased the AN Tasrail business from Pacific National. TasRail combined the above-rail (rollingstock) and business assets with the below-rail assets (track and associated infrastructure), for which the state had assumed responsibility in May 2007, to form a vertically integrated rail operator.

The Tasmanian Government Railways had operated the state's railway network until it passed to the federal government's Australian National in March 1978.

== Fleet ==
As of April 2017, the fleet consisted of 27 operational locomotives.

=== Current locomotive fleet ===
Class	Image	Type	Built	Top Speed (km/h)	Number	Notes
DQ class		Diesel-electric	1964–1969	80	12	From Pacific National in 2009
DV class		Diesel-electric	1961–1971	72	1	From Pacific National in 2009, De-motored and is used as a driving van
TR class		Diesel-electric	2013–2014	100	17	Purchased from Progress Rail and have Caterpillar 3512 engines, All are still in operation

=== Former locomotive fleet ===
Class	Image	Type	Built	Top Speed (km/h)	Number	Notes	Preservation
2050 class		Diesel-electric	1978	80	4	Purchased from Aurizon in 2011, all stored	
D class		Diesel-electric	1971	80	2	From Pacific National in 2009, all stored	
DC class		Diesel-electric	1964	100	1	From Pacific National in 2009, scrapped	
MKA class		Diesel-electric	1967–1972	80	6	From Pacific National in 2009, all stored	
QR class		Diesel-electric	1964–1969	80	3	From Pacific National in 2009, All scrapped	
Y class		Diesel-electric	1961–1971	72	8	From Pacific National in 2009, 7 preserved and 1 converted to driving van	2 at Derwent Valley Railway. 1 at Queen Victoria Museum & Art Gallery, Launceston. 1 at Tasmanian Transport Museum, Glenorchy. 1 at Launceston & North East Railway. 2 at Don River Railway, Devonport.
Z class		Diesel-electric	1973	97	4	From Pacific National in 2009, all preserved	2 at Don River Railway 2 at Bellarine Peninsula Railway
Za class		Diesel-electric	1973–1976	97	3	From Pacific National in 2009, 1 stored, 2 preserved	1 at Tasmanian Transport Museum 1 at Don River Railway
ZB class		Diesel-electric	1973	80	4	From Pacific National in 2009, 2 preserved, 2 stored	1 at Don River Railway 1 at Launceston and North East Railway
ZC class		Diesel-electric	1966–72	80	4	From Pacific National in 2009, 3 scrapped, 1 preserved	1 at Launceston and North East Railway
ZP class		Diesel-electric	1973	80	1	From Pacific National in 2009, preserved	Preserved at the Don River Railway
ZR class		Diesel-electric	1973	80	1	From Pacific National in 2009, stored	

== Road crossings ==
There are 199 level crossings on the TasRail network with active control at 123 crossings and passive control at the remainder. Active control includes flashing lights and warning bells that are activated by approaching trains and passive control includes 'Stop' or 'Give Way' sign which rely on motorists to watch for trains before crossing the railway line. From 2003 to 2012, there were 36 reported crashes at level crossings, with 20 resulting in casualties, 3 of which were fatal. Almost two thirds of crashes occurred within urban areas with speed limits 50 or 60 km/h. Relocation of the Hobart terminal to Brighton during June 2014 meant that 29 crossings became inactive, which was expected to reduce level crossing crashes in Tasmania by 30%.

== See also ==
- Tasmanian Government Railways
- Tasman Limited
- Rail transport in Tasmania
- Railway accidents in Tasmania
- Rail transport in Australia

Preceded by AN Tasrail	Rail transport in Tasmania; 2009-	Succeeded by Incumbent
